= Balochi culture =

Cultural activities of the Baloch people

Balochi culture (Balochi: بلۏچی دۏد) consists of the distinct socio-cultural practices of the Baloch people, who primarily inhabit the Balochistan region spanning modern day Pakistan, Iran, and Afghanistan.

== Language ==
Balochi is an Indo-European language, spoken by the Baloch and belonging to the Indo-Iranian branch of the family. As an Iranian language, it is classified in the Northwestern group.

These dialects are broadly categorized into three main groups:

- Soleimani: Spoken mainly in eastern Balochistan (Quetta, Kalat, Khuzdar)
- Makrani: Spoken mainly in the southern Balochistan (Gwadar, Turbat, Karachi)
- Rakhshani: Spoken mainly in western Balochistan (Zahedan, Zabol, Chabahar)
  - Koroshi is also a dialect with around 180 speakers (Fars province)

== Literature ==
Poetry holds a special place in Baloch culture, often expressing themes of love, bravery, and freedom. Prominent poets include Atta Shad and Gul Khan Nasir. The majority of Balochi literature is found in poetry.

Among the greats of Balochi literature, include but aren't limited to: Natiq Makrani, Mast Tawakali, Syed Zahoor Shah Hashmi, Saba Dashtyari, Muneer Ahmed Badini, and Ghulam Mohammad Lalzad Baloch.

Uppsala University offers a course titled Balochi A, which provides basic knowledge of the phonetics and syntax of the Balochi language. Carina Jahani is a prominent Swedish Iranologist and professor of Iranian languages at Uppsala University, deeply researching in the study and preservation of the Balochi language.

== Folklore ==
Baloch folklore (Balochi: بلۏچ لوک) consists of folk traditions which have developed in Balochistan over many centuries. The majority of such folk traditions are preserved in Balochi and deal with themes such as tragic love, resistance, and war. Many Baloch tribal leaders (Tamandar) are honoured through folk songs and ballads, notably those Tamandar remembered for their zeal in defending the principle of Ahot ("protection").

The history of Baloch tribes is captured in the ballads which narrate the conflicts and wars fought by various clans, celebrating the valor of tribal chiefs and heroes. Below is a list of tales:

- Hani and Sheh Mureed
- Kiyya and Sadu
- Shahdad and Mahnaz
- Hammal and Mahganj
- Lallah and Granaz
- Dostin and Shirin
- Bebarg and Granaz
- Mast and Sammo
- Balach and the Bulethis

Mir Chakar Rind and Mir Gwahram Khan Lashari, the most famous Baloch epic, recounting the story of the 30-year war between the Rind and Lashari tribes.

Hani and Sheh Mureed, a tragic story. It tells of the deep love between Hani and Sheh Mureed and the societal pressures that ultimately lead to their separation.

Balach Gorgej is depicted in the mythological part the Balochi literature and poets.

Mir Hammal Jiand was a Baloch chief in 15th, particularly for his role during the conflicts with Portuguese colonial forces in the 15th century.

Baloch mythology often beliefs and geography, featuring supernatural. Koh-e-Murad mountain is considered sacred, and legends speak of saints who performed miracles there.

Ashkash is introduced in several verses in the Shahnameh as the commander of the Baloch army. This work has inspired Baloch tales and has appeared in the works of Baloch writers and Baloch folklore.

== Music ==
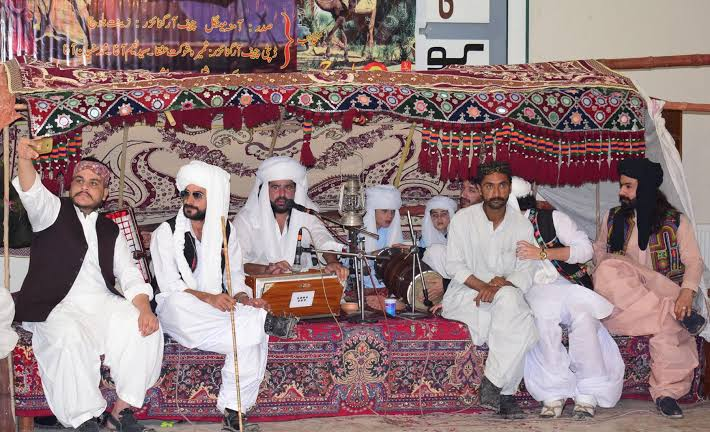
Photo of men playing Balochi folk music

Traditional Balochi music includes instruments like the suroz (a string instrument). Songs often narrate tales of heroism, love, and tribal history. Some Balochs often believe that Zahirok is the basis of all Balochi music and the essence of the melodies used in singing Balochi narrative song.

The Chaap dance are performed during celebrations, accompanied by rhythmic beats and communal participation. Chaap is a balochi dance mostly performed by forming a circle by a group of people, dancing and clapping.

== Handicraft ==
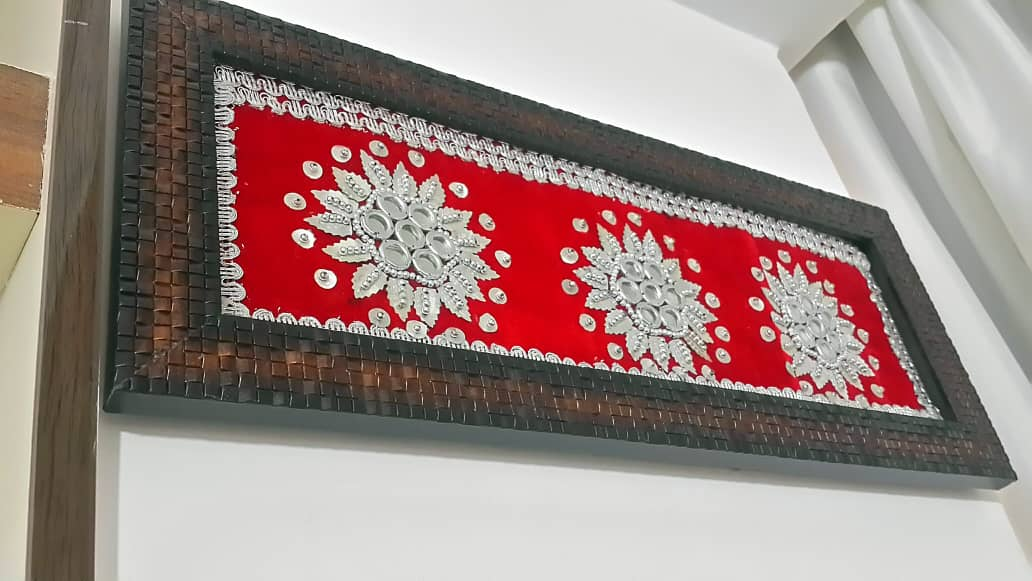
Baloch mirror embroidery

Balochi handicrafts are handicraft or handmade crafted works originating from Baloch people.

Balochi mirror work embroidery is a type of traditional Balochi embroidery and art that is used to decorate coats, cloth, hat(pag), cushion covers, tablecloths, bags, shoes, vests, local clothing between Baloch of afghanistan and pakistan.

Balochi coin work embroidery is one of the handicrafts of Balochistan that the Baloch generally use to decorate bedspreads or camel necks during weddings, and they often hang them on the walls to decorate rooms. Balochi coin embroidery is very popular among the Baloch people in Iran and has created a large market.

Balochi rug are typically eight feet in length, which made them lighter and easier to transport. Their material typically includes wool or a mixture of wool and goat hair; newer carpets have a warp made of cotton and sturdy wool pile rugs.

== Clothing ==
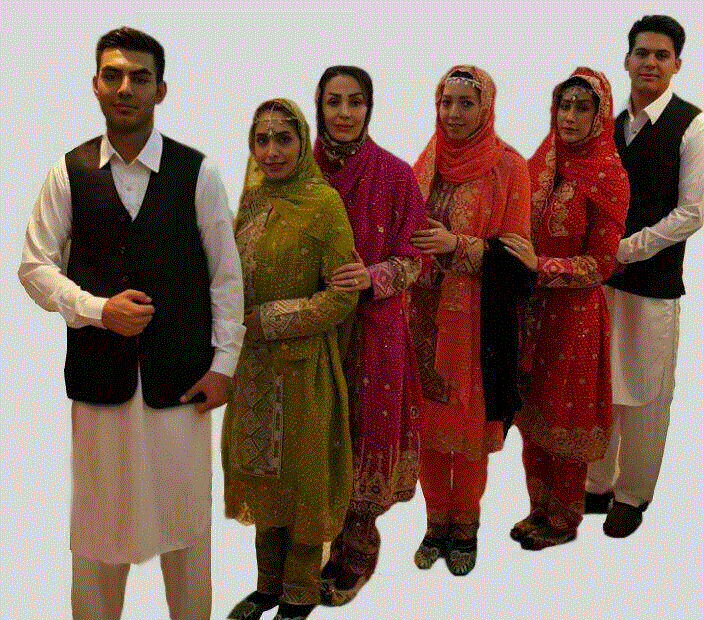
Balochi traditional dress

The Baloch have worn their traditional clothing since ancient times, and this clothing was spread beyond the borders of Balochistan by ancient dynasties. Pakistan and India dressing have been greatly influenced by the Baloch clothing.

Baloch needlework, which is used on Baloch women's clothing, in some sources, the beginning of this art is 100 to 200 years before Islam, and the available evidence indicates that this method of sewing has been common among the Baloch people since the beginning of Islam.

Gold ornaments such as necklaces and bracelets are an important aspect of Baloch women's traditions and among their most favoured items of jewellery are dorr, heavy earrings that are fastened to the head with gold chains so that the heavy weight will not cause harm to the ears. They usually wear a gold brooch (tasni) that is made by local jewellers in different shapes and sizes and is used to fasten the two parts of the dress together over the chest.

== Customs and beliefs ==
The Baloch community is traditionally tribal, with a strong sense of loyalty to their Tumandars (Balochi: تَمندار) or Sardar (chiefs). However, there are also non-tribal Baloch communities.

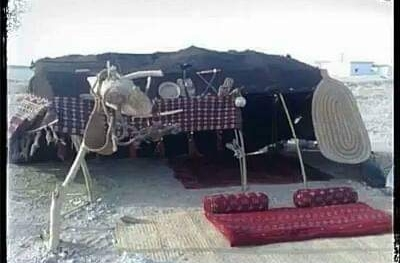
Lifestyle of Baloch nomads

Lajj o Mayaar (Mayar jali) (Balochi: میارجلی) Hospitality is a key cultural value, and guests are treated with utmost respect.

Mehr (Balochi: مهر) A Baloch hate the enemy to the extreme and highest regards and love for those he likes.

Hak Peheli (Balochi: هک پهلی) means asking for exemption and forgiveness. reconciliation, letting go of grudges, Basically It is done by hugging three times after the prayer on both Eid al-Adha and Eid al-Fitr.

Diwan (Balochi: دیوان): In Balochi society, Diwan means sense of assembly and conference. Sardars and elders of the tribes(chiefs) gather in a certain place and discuss important matters of the people.

Mesthaagi (Balochi: مستاگی) the reward for giving good news like the birth of a son, news of the arrival of a lost relative, etc.

Bijjaar (Balochi: بیجار) is an aid for ceremonies such as marriage and death to a person that is unable to pay. often, the Sardar asks for bijjaar for a needy tribesman.

Like other people around the world, Baloch people are known for believing in supernatural powers such as the wind and sea. They believe that crossing the boundaries of supernatural powers like "nazzar" (the evil eye) and jinn can affect or curse a human life.

=== Trial by ordeal ===
Trial by ordeal has been an important principle among Baloch people in the past. Mahnaz's consent to take this oath in the Baloch tale "Shahdad and Mahnaz" is evidence of this claim.

This ritual was common in all regions of Balochistan until about fifty years ago and it is still seen in some areas. Today, the Var ritual (Balochi: آیینِ وَر) has given way to the oath of the Quran, and this type of oath also has a special ceremony. The Var ritual has been popular among the Baloch in various forms, the most famous and common of which was with fire or water. The water oath or "Api Sogand" (cold Var) (Balochi: آپی سوگند) was more common in the southern regions of Balochistan, but in general, the oath with fire (hot Var) was more common. The culprit had to prove his innocence by walking through the fire or putting his hands on a hot rod. In Balochi folk stories there are numerous instances when the innocence of the offender had to be proven by putting his hands on the hot stone.

A number of Baloch tribes still preserve and adhere to pre-Islamic traditions, including the Nal oath (a type of oath to prove innocence by passing through fire) which is common among the Baloch around Taftan, and they are bilingual, speaking Parsiwani in addition to the Balochi language.

== Traditional games ==
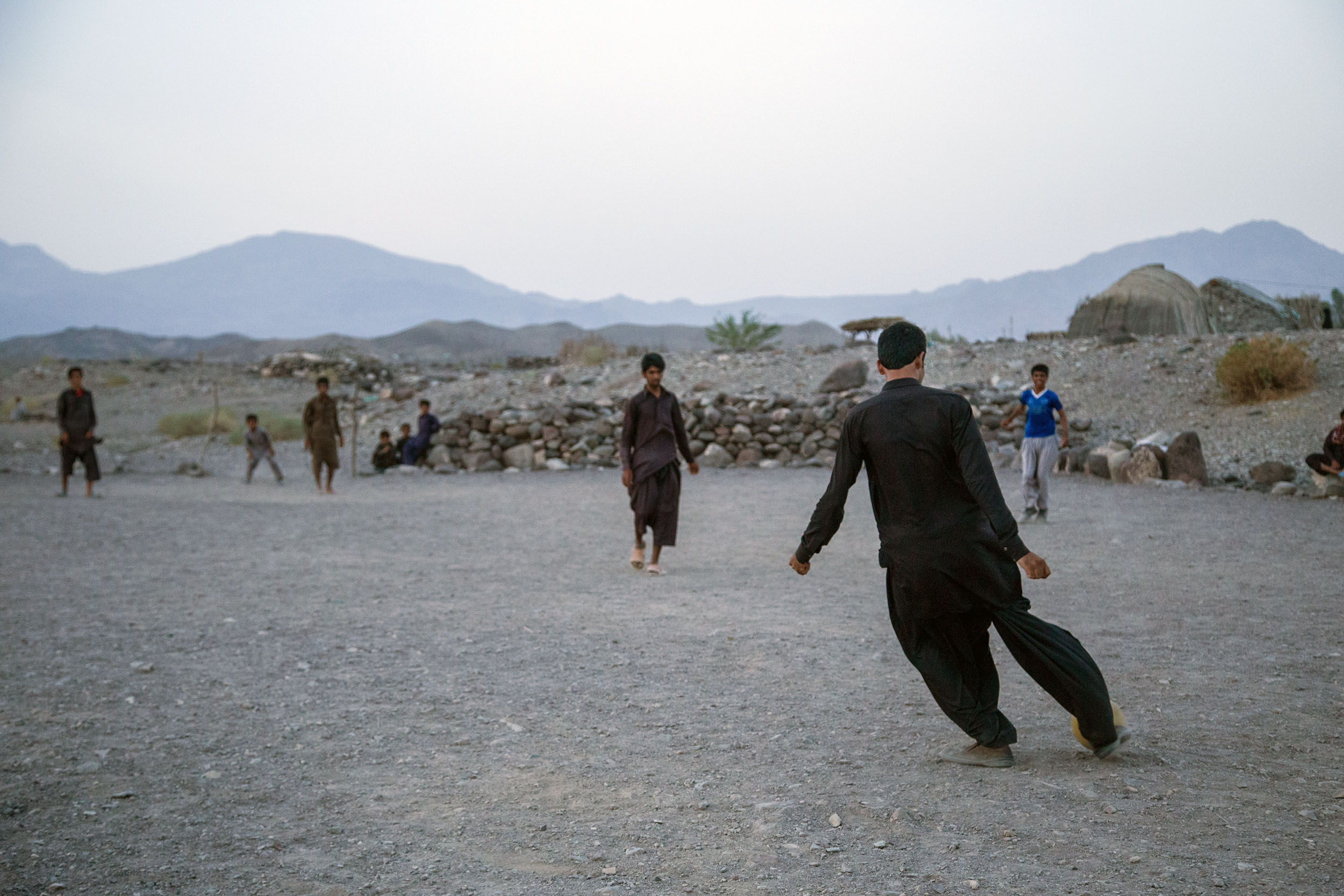
street football - Baloch in Iran, Kerman

The Baloch have many traditional games that are a legacy from the past and rooted in Baloch culture.

Chal bazi (Balochi: چَل‌بازی): A group game played between two teams with equal numbers of 5 people. Each team avoids the other group by swimming and splashing water on the other side, and they reach the starting place and find the wood and announce it. Whichever team scores more points wins.

Kala chal chal (Balochi: کلاچَلچَل): Two teams stand facing each other four to five meters from the circle. The players run towards the circle as soon as they hear their number. The goal is to reach the hat and return to their team. Whoever can remove the hat first wins that round.

Kapag (Balochi: کَپَگ): This game can be played with 10 to 12 people and is played by children and teenagers. circles should be drawn on the ground and people should be divided into two groups. People fight each other by holding one of their legs and pushing the combination.

Lagosh (Balochi: لگوش): is played in the palm groves of Balochistan. The number of participants is between 5 and 20 people. In this game, one person is known as the wolf. He holds a "pag/dastar" (Balochi turban) in his hand that is decorated in a knitted form. He then goes after people and when he hits someone with this pag, that person becomes a wolf.

Camel riding is one of the indigenous sports of Balochistan, which is more common, especially in the cities of Khash and Iranshahr (Iran), Nimruz (Balochistan Afghanistan) and is held on special occasions.

Riding horse, Horse race and sports resembling or archery provided sound practical training for young men is popular among the Baloch. Balochi horse is a breed of horse native to the Balochistan.

== Cuisine ==
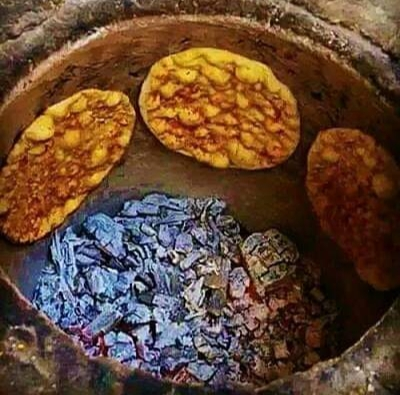
Baloch bread

Baloch cuisine is noted for its traditional and unique food culture. Dalag is among the prominent dishes regarded by the Baloch people as a core element of their culture and identity. Sajji is familiar in other parts of the country.

Tabaheg (Balochi: تباهگ) is a traditional Balochi food in which the meat is salted and dried with sour pomegranate and salt. Tabaheg is cooked with rice. Tabaheg is one of the most famous foods of Balochistan region.

== Cinema ==
Balochi cinema refers to the Balochi-language film industry in Pakistan, Iran, and among the Baloch diaspora.

In Iran, Balochi theatre is in its infancy stage and is concentrated mainly in Zahedan, Iranshahr, and Khash. As of 2008, Zahedan-based Honorkadeh Saba was the sole cultural institution promoting Balochi cinema and theatre.

In recent years, a younger generation of Baloch filmmakers has emerged in Balochistan and Karachi, as part of the new wave of Pakistani cinema. This phase has witnessed the production of quality short films as well as documentaries focusing on social and political issues. Balochi films often show social grievances, oppression, torture, human rights violations, and life as a stranger.

== Festivals ==
Baloch Culture Day is celebrated by the Balochi people annually on 2 March with festivities to celebrate their rich culture and history.

On 2 March, Baloch people celebrate its culture day every year, where people from different villages gather together to organise various cultural programs. It marks its historical significance across the provincial state. The events include folk music, dance, craft exhibition and other activities.

== Religion ==
The Baloch are predominantly Muslim, with the vast majority belonging to the Hanafi school of Sunni Islam, but there is also tiny proportion of Shia in Balochistan.

Before the Islam era, the Baloch were the followers of Mazdakian and Manichean sects of Zoroastrian.
