= Balochi literature =

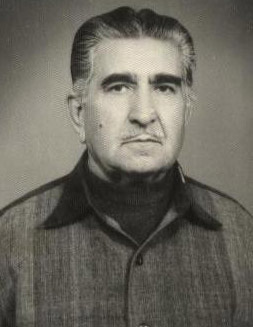
Mir G.K.Nasir-Malek o-Sho'arā Balochistan

Balochi literature (Balochi: بلۏچی ادب or بلۏچی لبزانک) is literature written in the Balochi languages.

The main Balochi literature is found in poetry, which is purely popular in origin and form. Poetry is by the Baloch regarded as the highest form of literature.

Baloch literature is a reminder of different eras of Baloch culture and civilization, sadness, joys, and the narration of their ancient and old legends and myths, including the stories of Hani and Sheh Mureed, Jalal Khan, Mir Chakar Rind, Hammal Jiand, Ges'dok, Ashkash (character from Shahnama), and Duda and Balach's epic are mixed together.

Among the greats of Balochi literature, can mention Natiq Makrani, Mast Tawakali, Abdullah Rwanbod and Syed Zahoor Shah Hashmi, Saba Dashtyari, Mir Gul Khan Nasir, Muneer Ahmed Badini, Aziz Sanghur and Ghulam Mohammad Lalzad Baloch.

== History ==
Carina Jahani cited that attributed her interest and fascination with the Balochi language to the oral literature, myths, and beautiful and instructive stories hidden in the hearts of the old men and women of this ancient land. She found speaking the Balochi language very sweet and attractive.

The history of Balochi literature spreads over thousands years having its roots in the oral tradition, However, the first recorded period begins in 12th century which state that poets to compose love songs, record their traditional history and their relations with their neighbours, their intertribal feuds (relations and affairs) and their conquest drivers (military power).

In 1978, it was designated as a national language in Afghanistan, where it is currently taught in schools within Nimroz Province and supported by a dedicated department at the University of Kandahar. Conversely, in Pakistan and Iran, Balochi holds no official status and is largely excluded from the formal education systems..

In Pakistan, several initiatives have sought to preserve the language. The Balochi Academy was founded in Quetta in 1961, followed by the establishment of a Baluchi Studies department at the University of Balochistan in 1997. During the early 1990s, the language was briefly introduced into state primary schools.

Balochi language was one of the court languages during the rule of the Kalat Khanate. Writers in the era of the Baloch khanate of Kalat have enriched the Balochi language and literature by writing several books of prose. Jām Durrak, the court poet of Nasir khan composed love poems, some of it has been collected and published.

1930s a few individuals, led by Moḥammad Ḥosayn "ʿAnqā," wrote for a public in Balochi, producing a short-lived weekly paper Bolan.

The Balochi Academy founded in Quetta in 1961 by a revival in Balochi literature, with poets like Gul Khan Naseer leading the way in expressing themes of identity, culture, and resistance against oppression. In 1997, Chief Minister of Balochistan Akhtar Mengal, who was interested in supporting the language, provided the Academy with land and a grant to construct its own building.

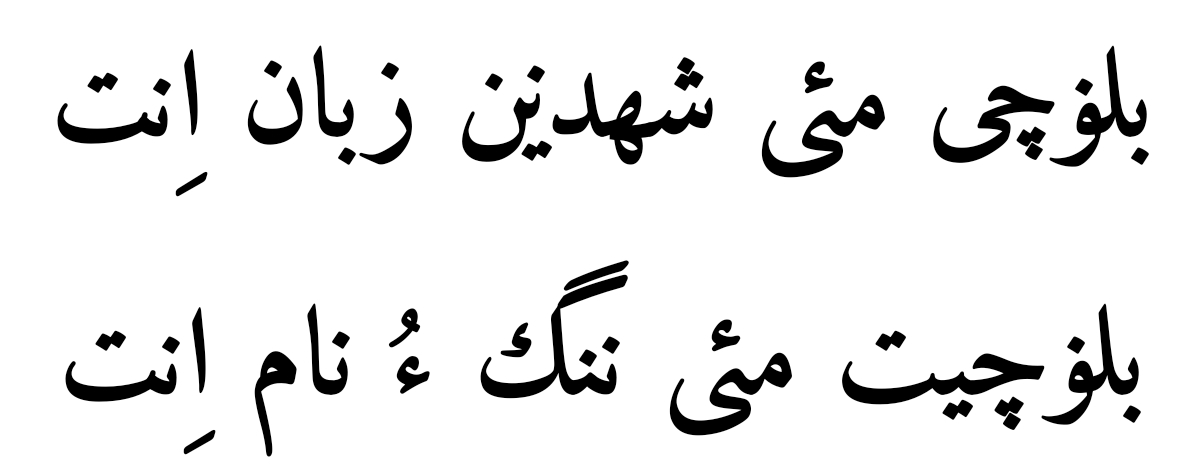
a writing with Balochi Standard Alphabets

Several introductory works on Balochi oral literature, mostly in Urdu have published since 1970, History of Balochi language and literature by Syed Zahoor Shah Hashmi 1986, History of Balochi language and literature by Shir Mohammad Mari in 1973 and Balochi literature: Its history, its continuity by Panah Baloch in 2016.

Systematic literary production in Balochi did not begin until around 1950 in Pakistan, where most Balochi publications still originate. Smaller amounts have also been printed in some Middle Eastern countries and India. In 1979, printing in Balochi began on a modest scale in Iran and Kabul.

After The Iranian revolution in 1979, Baloch educators and writers published papers such as "Makoran", "Kokar" and "Rozhnaee" in Balochi language for the first time in Iran.

Nawai Watan is a Balochi-language newspaper published in Quetta, Balochistan, Pakistan.

In 1875, Mansel Longworth Dames took great interest in the scientific study and collection of Baloch poems and songs, and for the first time in 1881, he presented examples of them in an article titled "A Sketch of the Northern Balochi Language".

== Writing System and History ==
The written tradition of Balochi is relatively recent. The earliest attempts to write Balochi date back to the 19th century, when the British introduced a Latin-based alphabet for the language. Following Pakistan's independence in 1947, Baloch scholars shifted to the Perso-Arabic script. Nowadays, a modified version of the Urdu script is the most common writing system for Balochi, although no official standardization has been established.

The earliest known example of Balochi in written form is a 19th-century manuscript currently preserved in the British Museum.

== Genres ==
Prior to the introduction of writing in the 20th century, Balochi literature was almost entirely oral. This tradition was maintained by professional performers, including the Pahlawan (singers of heroic epics), Sawti (performers of lyric love songs), and Gwashinda (non-professional singers). Poetry is traditionally regarded as the pinnacle of Balochi literary expression, encompassing a vast corpus of heroic epics and romantic lyrics.

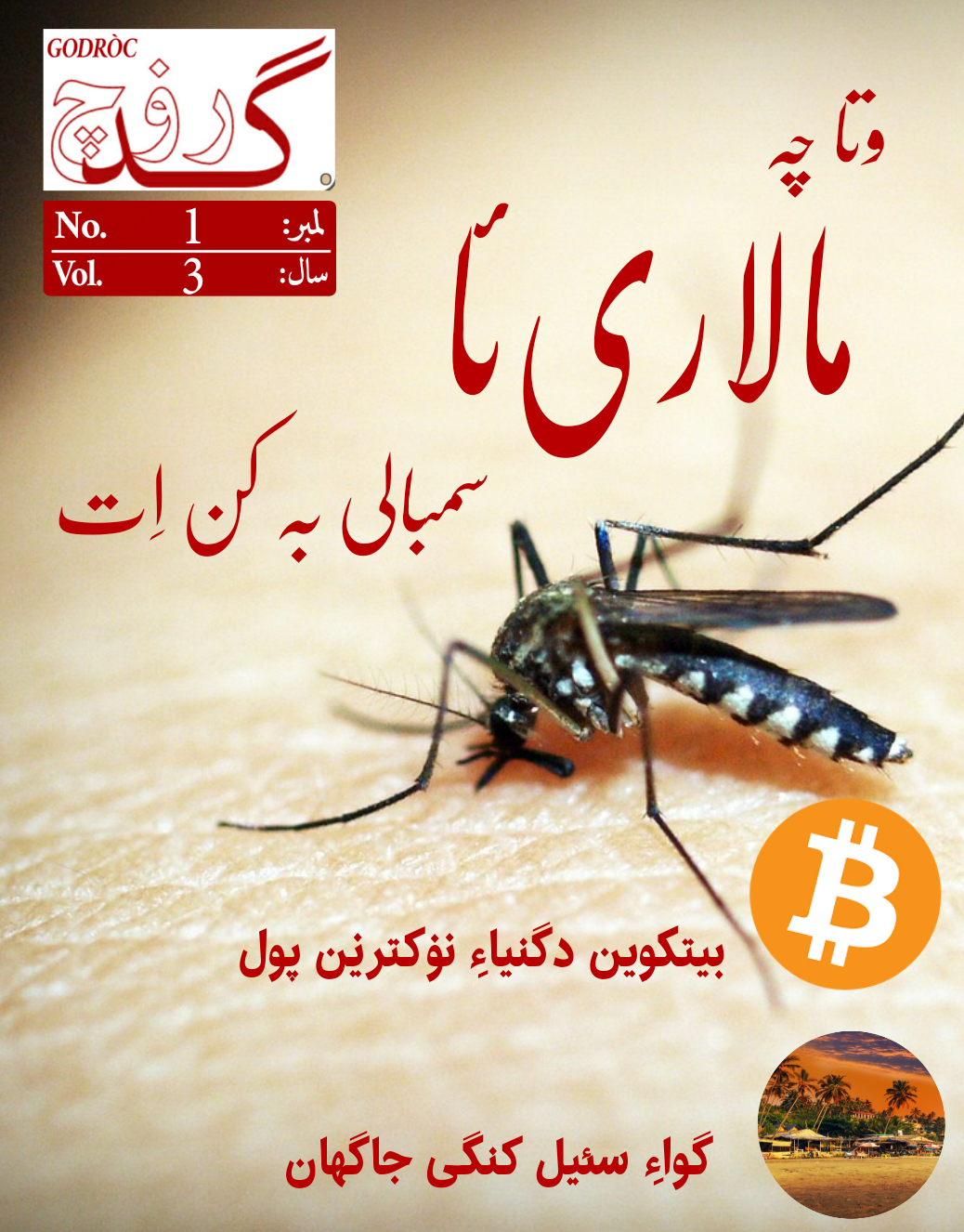
A publication in the Balochi language

Storytelling also remains a vital cultural practice, with elders passing down fairytales, legends, and fables during nightly gatherings. A unique feature of this tradition is the inclusion of riddles, which are featured in both ancient and modern poems and often serve as the basis for family-oriented riddle contests.

The memories of the Baloch people are full of songs that describe national events and Baloch heroism. These songs have been transferred by singers, minstrels, and itinerant which belongs to poetry of Mir Chakar's era and Mir Gwahram Khan Lashari. style of the following types:

1. Heroic or epic ballads dealing with the early wars and settlements of the Baloches.

2. More recent ballads, mainly dealing with the wars of tribes now existing, and other tribal ballads. Balach Gorgej an epic Hero in sixteenth century that in is depicted in the mythological part the Balochi literature and peots. The bravery and chivalry of legendary figure preserved by the contemporary people. Mir Hammal Jiand is a Baloch hero in 15th, particularly for his role during the conflicts with Portuguese colonial forces in the 15th century. He is often compared to other notable Baloch leaders like Mir Chakar Khan Rind.

3. Romantic ballads.

4. Love songs and lyrics.

5. Religious and didactic poems.

6. Short poems, including lullabys, dastanaghs, and rhymed riddles.

Apart from poetry, Balochi has its own prose style of the following types:

1. Balochi folk tales often characterized by oral storytelling and ballads that convey historical narratives and cultural values. Notable works from this period include tales of tribal warfare and romantic epics such as "Hani and Sheh Mureed, Shahdad and Mahnaz, Hammal and Mahganj, Lallah and Granaz, Dostin and Shirin, Bebarg and Granaz, Mast and Sammo"

2. Modern style literature Modern writers and poets continue to enrich Balochi literature by addressing contemporary issues while drawing from traditional forms. Figures like Sayed Zahoor Shah Hashimi are recognized for their foundational contributions to modern Balochi prose and poetry.

== Proverbs ==
Here is a list of Balochi Proverbs(Balochi: بلوچی بتل):

Balochi Proverb(Balochi: بلوچی بتل)	Meaning in English
آ گوهار ء َ کہ تنگئيں برات نيست، چو کلات ء کہ واجہ يے ماں نيست	If a sister is without a brother, she is like that fort which is without king
مرد کہ لج کنت بہائی کک اِنت، جن کہ لج کنت بہائی لکه اِنت	A shy man is worth a goat, a shy woman is worth a city
اگا بیکارین سوال جست کنی گورا ترا بیکارین جواب مل ات	Ask Silly Questions and You"ll Get Silly Answers
لوگ په مردم و مردم په لوگ	The house becomes beautiful with its people and the people with the house
تاسے آپ بور ، سد سال و پا کں	If you drank a glass of water in someone's house, you should be indebted to the owners of that house for a hundred years and always maintain their sanctity
شُدءَمرد گوں مزارءَميڑينتگگ	Hunger has made man fight with the lion
ریش وتی دست ءَ سپه دارنت	Do not behave in such a way that you lose your dignity
جوهر بلوچ آغیرتینت	The essence of Baloch is zeal and diligence
مرد په نام مریت نامرد په نان	A brave man dies for his name and a coward for his bread
وھدے کے پیشی ھدا نبی ات گورا مشک لیب کن انت	When the cat is away the mice play

== See also ==
- Rakhshani dialect
- Makrani dialect
- Balochi language
- Natiq Makrani
- Gul Khan Nasir
- Syed Zahoor Shah Hashmi
- Mast Tawakali
