= Rind-Lashari War =

Baloch intertribal conflict (1582–1612)

Rind-Lashari War was a 30-years long war between the Baloch tribes of Rind and Lashari from 1582 to 1612.

== The 30 year war ==
The 30-year war was an intra Baloch conflict lasting almost 30-year-long and fought between the forces of Mir Chakar Khan Rind (tribal ruler) and Mir Gwaharam Khan Lashari in 15th century CE.

Mir Chakar Rind lived in Sevi (modern city of Sibi) in the hills of Balochistan and became the head of Rind tribe at the age of 18 after the death of his father Mir Shehak Khan. Mir Chakar's kingdom was short-lived because of a civil war between the Lashari and Rind tribes of Balochistan. Mir Chakar Rind and Mir Gwaharam Khan Lashari, head of the Lashari tribe, went to war that resulted in thousands dead, including Mir Chakar's brother. The war and the gallantry of the two tribe leaders continues to be a part of the Baloch peoples' history. After the "Thirty Years' War" against the Lashari Tribe, Mir Chakar Rind left Balochistan and settled in the Punjab region in 1518 with other Rind tribes. These tribes are settled in southern central Punjab.
