= Sib and Suran Castle =

Castle in Sib and Suran, Iran

- قلعه سیب و سوران
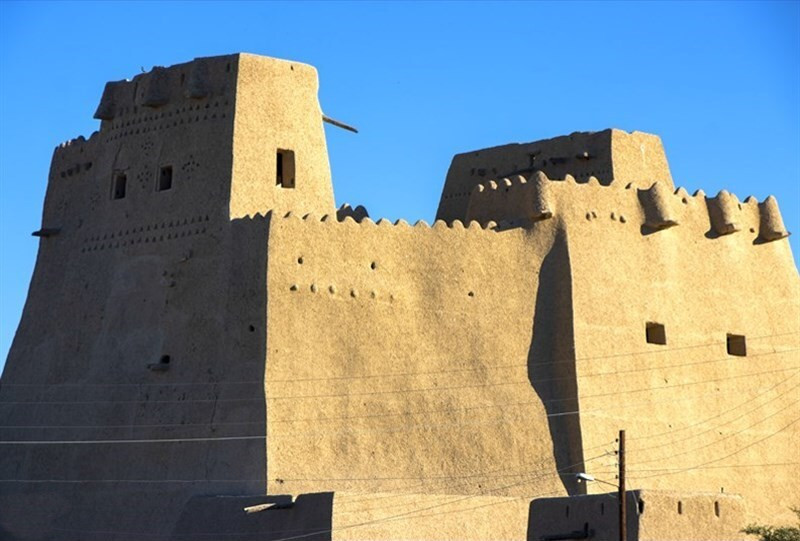
- Interactive map of the Sib and Suran Castle area

General information
- Type: Castle
- Architectural style: Iranian
- Location: Sib and Suran County, Iran

Sib and Suran Castle is a castle in Sib and Suran County in Sistan and Balochistan province, and is one of the attractions of Sib and Suran County. This castle has been ruled by Hoth, Buledi, Dagarani Rind, Gichki and Mirmoradzai rulers in different periods.
