= Jatoi (clan) =

Baloch tribe in Pakistan

The Jatoi (Balochi: جتوئی) is a Baloch tribe in Sindh and the Kacchi Plain in the east of Balochistan.

== History ==
Balochi traditional ballads tell of a leader named Mir Jalal Khan who had four sons, Rind, Lashar, Hot, and Korai, and a daughter Jato, who married his nephew Morad. According to these ballads, These five are the eponymous founders of Rinds, Lasharis, Hoth, Korai, and Jatoi Tribe .

The subclans of the Jatoi are Shar, Aterani, Nichrani, Perozani, Jafrani, Bullani, Lahorzai, Bullo, Misrani, Kharoos, Zangeja, Kosh, Baghani, Tarrt, Shadinja, Birhamani.

Members of the Jatoi tribe mainly speak Saraiki and Sindhi.
