= Chakyani =

Coordinates: 27.835303°N 67.981153°E

Chakiyani چاڪياڻي
- Union Council
- Location in Sindh, Pakistan Chakiyani (Pakistan)
- Country: Pakistan
- Province: Sindh
- District: Qambar Shahdadkot
- Tehsil: Shahdadkot

Population
  - Total: 3,000
- Time zone: UTC+5 (PST)

Chakiyani چاڪياڻي is a village in the Sindh province of Pakistan. It is the Union Council of the talka/tehsil Shahdadkot of the district Qamber Shahdadkot. Most of the land of the Union Council Chakyani belongs to Wadho and Umrani community. Wadho tribe is known for its contributions in the field of education. Wadho community donates village plots for development and prosperity of the village, such as for school, hospital, and water supply, to the government. Chakyani has a population of around 3,000 people. It is located around 48 kilometres northwest of Larkana and 18 kilometers south of Talka Sijawal The Union Council Chakyani is one of the constituencies of the former prime ministers of Pakistan, Zulfiqar Ali Bhutto and Benazir Bhutto.
