= Balochi Academy =

Language regulatory institution in Quetta, Pakistan

- Formation: 1961; 65 years ago
- Type: Autonomous institution under the Government of Balochistan
- Headquarters: Balochi Academy Headquarters
- Location: Shahrah-e-Adalat, Quetta, Balochistan, Pakistan
- Official language: Balochi
- Chairman: Sangat Rafiq
- Website: balochiacademy.org

The Balochi Academy is an autonomous institution under the government of the Pakistani province of Balochistan, that fosters the Balochi language, literature and culture. It supports literary circles; conducts seminars and conferences; and invites academics from all across Pakistan and abroad as guest speakers. It was officially established in 1961, and is headquartered in Quetta, the capital of Balochistan.

It publishes books, translated works, and original research in Balochi, as well as in Urdu, Pashto, English and Persian.

== History ==
The academy was established in 1958.

Before 1997 the Academy didn’t have a building of its own. In 1997, Chief Minister of Balochistan Akhtar Mengal, who was interested in supporting the language, provided the Academy with land and a grant to construct its own building.

In 1999, the complex was officially opened. It is a three-story building in central Quetta with a library and conference hall.

== Chairmen ==
- Sangat Rafiq
