= Jalal Khan =

Legendary figure in Baloch history

Jalal Khan (Balochi:جلال خان) is a legendary figure in the history of the Baloch people who led 44 Baloch tribes from Persia to Makran in modern-day Pakistan, founding the first Baloch confederacy in the 12th century. He died in Kech, Makran, leaving behind four sons: Rind Khan, Hoth Khan, Lashar Khan, Korai Khan; and a daughter, Bibi Jato, who was married to his nephew Murad. The Baloch tribes of Rind, Lashari, Hoth, Korai and Jatoi descend from them. After his death, Rind Khan became chief of the Baloch tribes previously led by Jalal Khan.

Since 12th century Baloch chieftains ruled over most of Balochistan. Mir Jalal khan and Mir Chakar after the establishment of the Baloch Confederation, They extended their dominance outside the borders of Balochistan, Mir Chakar seized control over Punjab and captured Multan. The great Baloch kingdom was based on tribal confederation, Punjab and Balochistan remained under his rule for a period of time.

Mir Jalal Khan is regarded as a symbol of bravery, leadership, and unity in Baloch culture. His legacy is celebrated in Baloch folklore, poetry, music and literature.

== Descendents ==
His children, from whom the major Baloch tribes descend. These tribes further divided into sub-tribes, creating a complex tribal structure.

This is a family tree of Mir Jalal Khan, his ancestors, and descendents.

Adregan
Ashraf
Ahlamash (Balochi:اعلمش)
Gol cheragh (Balochi:گل چراغ)
Sorkhtaj (Balochi:سرخ تاج)
Amareh (Balochi:عماره)
Miran(Mir Baloch)
Dost Mohammad
Amirjian
Amir Harun
Mir Jalal Khan
Rind	Lashar	Korai	Hot	Jatoi	Bulo	Ali	Ghazan
Razman	Nohbandagh	Bakar	Miro	Gwahram	Khosagh	Ali	Buleidi Tribe	Umar	Ghazani
Nasir Din	Husain	Hammal	Shahak	Punnil	Umrani
Ahmad	Naubat	Shau-ali -Bano
Gilo
Pheroz	Karim	Bahar
Kalo	Chaura
Pherozshah	Barkhurdar
Shahak	Yaghub	Fath
Shaihak	Hassan	Hammal	Qaisrani	Shahdad
Mir Chakar	Masti	Mazar
Shahzad	Shaihak

== See also ==
- Baloch people
- Medes
