= Lashari =

Baloch tribe

The Lashari (Balochi: لاشاری) is a Baloch tribe, mainly residing in Derajat, Makran, Sindh, and the Kacchi Plain in east of Balochistan.

== Introduction ==
Lashari — One of the main original sections, said to have settled in Gandava after the war with the Rinds, and to be now represented by the Magsi of Jhal in Kachhi. Lasharis in Kachhi keep their own name, and form the largest clan-of the Magsi tribe. Others are found in Mekran and Sistan, where they are identified with the Magsi. The Jistkanis also are of Lashari descent. There is a strong sub tuman of Lasharis in the Gurchani tribe, and other Lasharis of Drigri in Dera Ghazi Khan are apparently Jatts and Lasharis only in name. Lasharis are found wherever the Baloches settled in the Panjab, chiefly in Dera Ghazi Khan, Dera Ismail Khan, Muzaffargarh and Multan.

== Baloch folklore ==
According to Baloch folklore, Mir Jalal Khan, son of Jiand, is said to have been ruler over all the Baloches. He left four sons, named Rind, Lashari, Hoth, and Korai, and a daughter named Jato, who was married to his nephew Murad. These five are the eponymous founders of the five great divisions of the race, the Rinds, Lasharis, Hoths, Korais, and Jatois. There are, however, some tribes which cannot be brought within any of these divisions, and accordingly we find ancestors duly provided for them in some genealogies. Two more sons are added to the list—Ali and Bulo. From Bulo are descended the Buledis, and from Ali’s two sons, Ghazan and Umar, are derived the Ghazani Marris and the Umrani (now scattered among several tribes). I may here note that the genealogies given in the ‘Tuhfatu’l-Kiram seem to be apocryphal, and are not in accordance with Baloch tradition. It is there asserted that Jalálu’d-din was one of fifty brothers, and that he received one-half of the inheritance, the rest taking half between them, and that, while the descendants of the other brothers mingled with the people of Makran, those of Jalalu’d-din came to Sindh and Kachhi, and their descendants are spread through the country. The actual tradition of the Balochs, however, represents that the tribal divisions originated in the performance of Jalal Khan’s funeral ceremonies. Rind had been appointed by his father successor to the Phagh or Royal Turban, and proposed to perform the ceremonies and erect an asrokh, or memorial canopy. His brother Hoth, who was his rival, refused to join him, whereupon the others also refused; each performed the ceremony separately, ‘and there were five asrokhs in Kech. Some of the bolaks joined one and some another, and so the five great tribes were formed. In reality it seems probable that there were five principal gatherings of clans under well-known leaders, and that they became known by some nickname or descriptive epithet, such as the Rinds (‘cheats’), the Hoths (‘warriors‘), the Lasharis (‘men of Lashari‘), etc., and that these names were afterwards transferred to their supposed ancestors. The Buledis, or men of Boleda, 2 probably joined the confederacy later, and the same may be said of the Ghazanis and Umaranis.

== See also ==
- Mir Gwahram Khan Lashari
