= Surbandar =

Fishing Town

Coordinates: 25°13′33″N 62°27′26″E

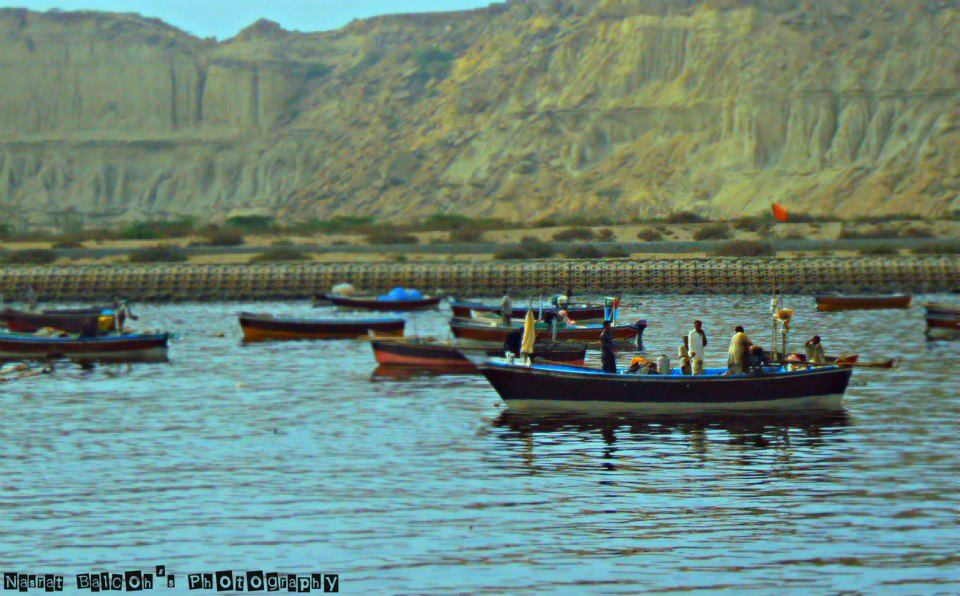
Surbandar سربندر
- Town
- Interactive map of Surbandar
- Country: Pakistan
- Province: Balochistan
- District: Gwadar
- Union Council: Gwadar East

Population (2025)
  - Total: ~20,000 (estimated)
- Time zone: UTC+5 (PST)
- Calling code: +92

Surbandar is a small coastal town in the Gwadar District of Balochistan, Pakistan. Situated along the Arabian Sea, it is primarily a fishing village where the local population depends on fishing as their main source of income. The town is located near the city of Gwadar, which has become strategically important due to the development of the Gwadar Port and the China–Pakistan Economic Corridor (CPEC). Surbandar's natural beauty, characterized by its coastal landscape and nearby hills, adds to the region's appeal. The town is part of a broader area that is expected to see significant economic development due to its strategic location.

== History ==
Surbandar is a place where history, culture, and the sea intertwine. Nestled along the Arabian Sea, Surbandar has long been a fishing village, its identity shaped by the ebb and flow of the tides and the rhythms of coastal life. While Surbandar remains a modest settlement, its history is rich with the influences of ancient trade routes, regional powers, and the modern developments that are transforming the Gwadar region.

=== Early beginnings ===
The history of Surbandar is intimately linked to the broader historical context of the Makran coast, a region that has been inhabited for millennia. The Makran coast, stretching from present-day Iran through Balochistan to Karachi, has always been a significant corridor for trade and communication between South Asia, the Middle East, and beyond. Evidence suggests that the coastal areas, including Surbandar, have seen human settlement and maritime activity for centuries, if not longer.

The people of Surbandar, like their neighbors along the Makran coast, have historically relied on the sea for their livelihood. Fishing has been the primary occupation, with techniques and traditions passed down through generations. The sea was not just a source of food but also a means of connecting with distant lands, as Surbandar was part of the intricate web of maritime trade routes that crisscrossed the Arabian Sea.

=== Islamic and colonial influence ===
With the spread of Islam in the 7th century, the Makran coast, including the area around Surbandar, came under Muslim rule. The region saw the influence of various Islamic empires, including the Ghorids and the Mughals, who controlled parts of Balochistan at different times. Despite these changes in political power, the daily life of Surbandar's inhabitants remained largely focused on fishing and local trade.

In the 18th century, the geopolitical landscape of the region shifted when Gwadar and its surrounding areas, including Surbandar, came under the control of the Sultanate of Oman. The Omani period marked the development of Gwadar as a small but significant port town, though Surbandar itself remained a fishing village with a relatively stable way of life. The town's proximity to Gwadar meant that it was part of the broader economic and cultural exchanges that occurred along the coast.

=== Modern times ===
The modern history of Surbandar is closely tied to the political changes in the region during the 20th century. In 1958, the Sultanate of Oman sold Gwadar to Pakistan, integrating the region into the newly independent country. This transfer marked the beginning of a new chapter in Surbandar's history, as Gwadar started to gain attention for its strategic location on the Arabian Sea.

For much of the 20th century, Surbandar remained a quiet fishing village, with limited infrastructure and development. However, the 21st century brought significant changes to the region with the launch of the China-Pakistan Economic Corridor (CPEC) and the development of Gwadar Port. These projects have transformed Gwadar into a focal point of international interest, with the potential to turn the entire region into a hub of trade and economic activity.

While Surbandar has not yet experienced the same level of development as Gwadar, its proximity to the port city means that it could see significant changes in the coming years. The ongoing development projects are likely to bring new opportunities, as well as challenges, to the people of Surbandar. The town's history, rooted in the sea and shaped by centuries of continuity and change, will continue to evolve as it navigates the currents of modernity.

Surbandar, with its long history as a coastal settlement, is a testament to the enduring connection between the people of Balochistan and the sea. From its early days as part of ancient trade routes to its modern role in the Gwadar district, Surbandar has maintained its identity as a fishing village while being influenced by the broader historical forces at play. As the Gwadar region continues to develop, Surbandar's history will be an essential part of understanding the cultural and economic transformations taking place along Pakistan's coast.

In 2013, a leatherback turtle was successfully caught and released near the village, with the help of local fishermen and WWF-Pakistan

In 2017, the Gwadar Development Authority constructed a jetty at Surbandar.

== Demographics ==
Surbandar is a relatively small town with a population that has traditionally been stable, reflecting the limited economic opportunities and the self-sustaining nature of its economy. The town is primarily inhabited by ethnic Baloch people, who have lived in the region for generations. The population is predominantly Muslim, with local tradition and customs strongly influenced by Baloch culture and Islamic practices.

The town's population structure is typical of many rural communities in Pakistan, with a significant proportion of young people. The younger generation often faces the dual challenge of maintaining traditional livelihoods, such as fishing, while also seeking new opportunities brought by the recent developments in the Gwadar region. The presence of extended families living together is common, which strengthens community bonds but also reflects the challenges of economic migration, as some members of the younger generation move to nearby cities or abroad for better opportunities.

=== Economic demographics ===
Fishing is the cornerstone of Surbandar's economy, with the majority of the population directly or indirectly involved in the fishing industry. Traditional fishing methods are still prevalent, although there is a growing awareness of modern techniques and the potential for increased earnings through improved infrastructure and access to larger markets. The town's economy is mostly informal, with small-scale trade, local markets, and subsistence farming complementing the fishing industry.

Recent developments in Gwadar have started to influence the economic landscape of Surbandar. While many residents continue to rely on fishing, some have begun to explore opportunities in the construction and service sectors associated with the growing infrastructure around Gwadar Port. However, this transition is still in its early stages, and the town's economy remains largely traditional.

=== Education and literacy ===
Education in Surbandar, like in many rural areas of Balochistan, faces significant challenges. While there are primary schools in the town, access to higher education is limited, with many children having to travel to nearby towns or cities for secondary education. Literacy rates in Surbandar are improving, but they still lag behind national averages, particularly for women. However, there is a growing recognition of the importance of education, with local and national efforts aimed at improving literacy and educational outcomes.

In recent years, there has been a slight increase in educational initiatives, often supported by non-governmental organizations and government programs aimed at enhancing educational facilities and encouraging school attendance. These efforts are crucial for equipping the younger generation with the skills needed to navigate the changing economic landscape of the region.

=== Cultural and social demographics ===
The culture of Surbandar is deeply influenced by Baloch traditions, which are evident in the town's social structures, celebrations, and daily life. The Baloch people are known for their strong sense of community and hospitality, which are central to the social fabric of Surbandar. Traditional music, dance, and storytelling remain integral parts of cultural life, especially during local festivals and celebrations.

Social life in Surbandar is closely tied to the rhythms of the sea, with fishing activities dictating the pace of daily life. The community is tight-knit, with social gatherings and communal activities playing a vital role in maintaining social cohesion. Religious practices are also a significant part of life, with the local mosque serving as a central gathering point for the community.

=== Challenges and prospects ===
The demographics of Surbandar are at a crossroads, with the town facing both opportunities and challenges as it navigates the changes brought about by development in the Gwadar region. The influx of new economic opportunities could potentially lead to demographic shifts, with more people moving to the area or residents seeking new forms of employment. However, there are also concerns about the potential impact on the town's traditional way of life and the preservation of its cultural heritage.

One of the most pressing challenges for Surbandar is ensuring that its population benefits from the development taking place in the region. This includes improving access to education, healthcare, and infrastructure, as well as creating opportunities for sustainable economic growth that can support the town's population in the long term.
