= Hani and Sheh Mureed =

Epic ballad of Balochi folklore

Hani and Sheh Mureed or Murid (Balochi: ھانی ءُ شئ مرید; romanized Hàni-o-Shae Murid or Hero Šey Murīd) is an epic ballad of Baloch folklore. The story depicts the lives of Baloch heroes and their emotions, culture, exploring philosophical ideas such as God, evil, predestination. The protagonist of the story, Sheh Mureed (or Shaih Moreed), and the heroine, Hani, are symbols of pure and tragic love. The story dates back to the 15th century, considered to be the heroic age of Balochistan and the classical period of Balochi literature.

== Characters ==
=== Sheh Murid ===
Sheh Murid was the son of Sheh Mubarak, the chief of the Kahiri tribe. At that time when a man was known for his arts, Murid was famous as having mastered the arts of swordsmanship, horsemanship, and archery. For his skills and braveness, he was ranked the highest in the army of Mir Chakar Rind, the chief of the Kahiri army.

Murid's bow made of steel was so heavy that he was known as the "lord of the iron bow", because none but he alone could draw and shoot arrows from it.

=== Hani ===
Hani was the daughter of the Rind noble Mir Mandow. Hani was engaged to Sheh Murid and had been a childhood friend of Murid.

== Story ==
One day, when Mir Chakar and Sheh Murid were returning from a day of hunting, they stopped at the town where their fiancés lived. Since a Muslim Baloch woman traditionally never appears before her betrothed before the wedding, Mir Chakar and Sheh Murid decide to visit each other's fiancés. Sheh Murid went to Mir Chakar's fiancé, who brought him clean water in a silver bowl. Murid, dying of thirst, drank the entire bowl in a single gulp and became sick.

However, when Mir Chakar went to Hani, Sheh Murid's fiancée, she brought him clean water in a silver bowl in which she has placed dwarf palm leaf, properly washed. The chief was surprised by the pieces of straw, but he drank the water with care in order to avoid swallowing the straw. When he departed he found Murid vomiting and sick. Murid told him that the water had made him ill because he drank a lot of water on an empty stomach. Now Mir Chakar realized that Hani had acted wisely by putting pieces of straw in the water.

Some time later, Mir Chakar organized a gathering where poets put forward poetry of heroes. At the height of the revelry, Mir Chakar asked the nobles to make vows on which they must pledge their lives. Every chief at the gathering made a vow. Mir Jado, a noble there, swore that he would chop off the head of anyone who touched his beard at the assembly of nobles.

Then Bibarg, another noble, vowed that he would kill anyone who kills Hadeh. He was followed by Mir Haibitan who vowed that if anybody's camel joined his camel-herd he would never give it back. At last came the turn of Sheh Murid, who, madly in love with Hani, pledged that if anyone asked for anything in his possession on his wedding day, he would give it. Later on, Mir Chakar vowed that he would never tell a lie for the rest of his life.

He was true to his word; never in his lifetime after that was he found to have lied. Mir Chakar tested Mir Jado's word by asking his young son to touch his father's beard during an assembly of nobles. The young boy innocently did as he was told, Mir Jado turned his face and moved the boy, hoping no one noticed. However Mir Chakar encouraged the boy to repeat the action.

The boy grabbed his father's beard once more. The entire assembly became silent and looked towards Mir Jado. Full of wrath, Jado unsheathed his sword and smote the head of his innocent son in the presence of all the Rind nobles. Mir Chakar also tested Bibarg and Haibitan, finding them true to their word.

Now it was time to test Sheh Murid. Murid hosted a festive gathering on his wedding and invited renowned poets to entertain the audience. And at the close of the festivities, Sheh Murid, was ready to depart with his possessions. Mir Chakar asked for Hani.

Sheh Murid was shocked; he thought that he would have asked for his bow, which was a unique bow and he was a very good marksman with a strong bow. He was known as the lord of the iron bow. With a heavy heart and much sadness he told Mir Chakar to take Hani. The unexpected demand distressed him greatly, and Murid realized that he had lost Hani. If he did not keep his vow he would be mocked and future generations would have contempt for his name.

Soon after the annulment of Murid's engagement with Hani, she was soon married to Mir Chakar. But Murid was so shaken by this turn of events that he abandoned his former life and passed the days and nights in worship of Allah. He also composed poems eulogizing Hani's beauty and openly expressing his passionate love for her. The scandalous news of Murid's love for Mir Chakar's wife became the talk of every household in Balochistan. His father Sheh Mubarak tried to advise him, he composed a poem in Baluchi of the advice that his father gave him and the response to the advice. The poem in Balochi is as follows:

Balochi

Mani shehey mubarak gwashee
Bellow mureed gumraheeya,
Gumraheeya be raheya
Pa chaakare mahay janna.
Pa dosti dosta e nahay
Jaan ahay pashentagay,
Hani sha kour-ka geptagay
Zay chond-dilla cho beetagay.
Man jawab tarentaga,
Peeray pitto cho gwashtaga,
Wati meeray pito cho gwashtaga,
Shai abaee shai kabaee,
Agay takay bibiten hat-tali
Pahoukana hancho dost mani,
Shalwaray bonday darr kutain
Janay darre pakko kutain,
Lenchan wati jattay,
Hanga mano gah-bo-waton gah-be-waton

English

My Shai mubarak says,
O Mureed leave your aloofness,
Aloofness without purpose direction(purpose),
For chakars beautiful wife,
In the assemblies you are not amongst your friends,
You are like a walking corpse,
Hani's love has blinded you,
How will you carry on in this way,
I replied,
I advised my elderly father,
I advised my respected father,
O most honoured father,
O most esteemed,
If you were in my place likewise,
You would have left all your friends,
And stopped going to assemblies and noble gatherings,
You would have lost your mind,
And not be aware of how you dressed,
You would have clapped your hands,
On your lap and be,
In your own world,
At least i am sometimes with it
And sometimes not with it.

=== Departure and return ===
Sheh Murid then decided to leave the country and visit unknown lands across the seas. He followed a group of mendicants going to perform their pilgrimage at the holy cities of Makkah and Medina in Saudi Arabia. As tradition has it, Sheh Murid remained in Arabia for 30 years a long time during which time he truly became a mendicant and lived the life of an ascetic.

After spending years away, he returned to Sibi in shabby clothes with his hair hanging down to his waist. In the company of a band of beggars he passed himself off as an anonymous mendicant begging for alms at the palace of Mir Chakar Khan Rind. The maidservant gave bowls filled with grain to each mendicant, but when she presented this food to Murid, she saw that Murid's eyes were fixed upon Hani. Hani recognized him at once but held herself back as to not arise suspicions, but Chakar saw a sparkle in her eyes.

=== Recognition of Sheh Murid ===
As a favorite pastime of the Chakarian age, the Rind nobles gathered for an archery competition. During the contest, the nobles noticed the curiosity and interest of Murid, the leader of beggars. At first the Rind nobles treated him with a certain amount of disdain on account of his shabby appearance, laughing at him and asking how a mendicant clad in tattered clothes could bend a bow and hit a target. They gave him a bow and arrow.

He bent the bow but it could not bear the power of his arms and broke into pieces. They gave him another one, which he also broke. After he broke the third bow the Rind nobles grow a bit suspicious that he might be Sheh Murid. They sent someone to fetch Murid Khan's bow, which was made out of steel and was called jug ("yoke") because of its form and weight.

The epic tells us that this famous weapon had been tossed in a pen for sheep and goats after the "master of the iron bow" had departed and it had no owner to care for it. Because of its weight and toughness, it was useless in the hands of anyone else. When it was turned over to him, Sheh Murid caressed and kissed it, gently touching the strings as if they belonged to a sacred instrument; he scrutinized every inch. Then, as a master archer, he rolled up his beggar's mantle, bent the bow with great skill, and shot three arrows from it, passing one through the hole left by the previous one.

The Rind's suspicion that this beggar was in fact Sheh Murid was confirmed after the trial of the bow. The Rind nobles stopped Murid and a servant was sent to ask Hani for Murid's distinguishing signs and marks, which she would know because they had played together as children. Hani told of a sign on the upper left thigh, which her bracelet had made, and another one behind the eyebrow. When the Rinds checked the signs, they at last recognized Sheh Murid.

=== Union and departure to unknown world ===
Although Mir Chakar married Hani, he was unable to consummate the marriage. Whenever he approached Hani, he would freeze as if paralyzed. For years he carried on this way and realized that Hani can never truly be his. When he found out that Sheh Murid had returned, he told Hani that Sheh Murid was a great man and deserved her, so he divorced her and told her she was free to go to Sheh Murid.

Hani, who had not forgotten her first and only love, decided to go to him, she told him that Mir Chakar had realized his mistake and has now freed her so that Sheh Murid and her could be together. But Sheh Murid told her that he had now reached a different level and cannot step down from that level to take her she was a means by which he had reached closer to Allah. He took leave of her. On the following day Murid visited his father's camel herd, chose a white she-camel, mounted her, and disappeared from mortal eyes. He has become the immortal saint of the Baloch, and the common belief among the Baloch is that: ta jahan ast, Sheh Murid ast ("Until the living world, Sheh Murid remains immortal").

== See also ==
- Mir Chakar Rind
- Rind
- Balochi Culture
