= Culture of Balochistan =

The culture of Balochistan (Urdu: بلوچ ثقافت, Balochi: بلۏچی دۏد), or simply Baloch culture, is defined in terms of religious values, Balochi and Brahui language, literature and traditional values of mutual respect. It has its roots in the Balochi, Brahui, Sindhi, and Pashto. Folk music, Balochi handicrafts, drama and Balochi cinema play a significant role in Baloch culture. Quetta, the provincial capital of Balochistan, has several historical monuments such as Pirak, the Chaukhandi tombs and the Quaid-e-Azam Residency.

On 2 March, Balochistan celebrates its culture day every year, where people from different villages gather together to organise various cultural programs. It marks its historical significance across the provincial state. The events include folk music, dance, craft exhibition and other activities.

== Beliefs ==
Like other people around the world, Balochistan people are known for believing in supernatural powers such as the wind and sea. They believe that crossing the boundaries of supernatural powers like "nazzar" (the evil eye) and jinn can affect or curse a human life.

== Background ==
One of the most important parts of the cultural identity of the Baloch people is the Pashtu and brahui and balochi languages, the "99th most spoken language in the world". This language is spoken only by native people as it is one of the toughest languages. Besides language, Baloch dressing has been greatly influenced by the entire country. Their nomadic life style is completely different than other provincial states of the country.

Despite celebrating several colourful festivals peacefully and traditionally, there is also an unlawful tradition or settlement practice called Baad. Baad (dispute resolution) is an "unlawful marriage custom" found in its Harnai district that is used to make settlements between two enemies. To be more specific, a girl is given in compensation to a victim whose brother or any family member has been killed/murdered by the girl's very close relatives such as brother or father. All the decisions related to this custom are made by a single individual called jirga, who heads the tribal court. The young woman is then given to the deceased's family "without her consent".

== Food ==
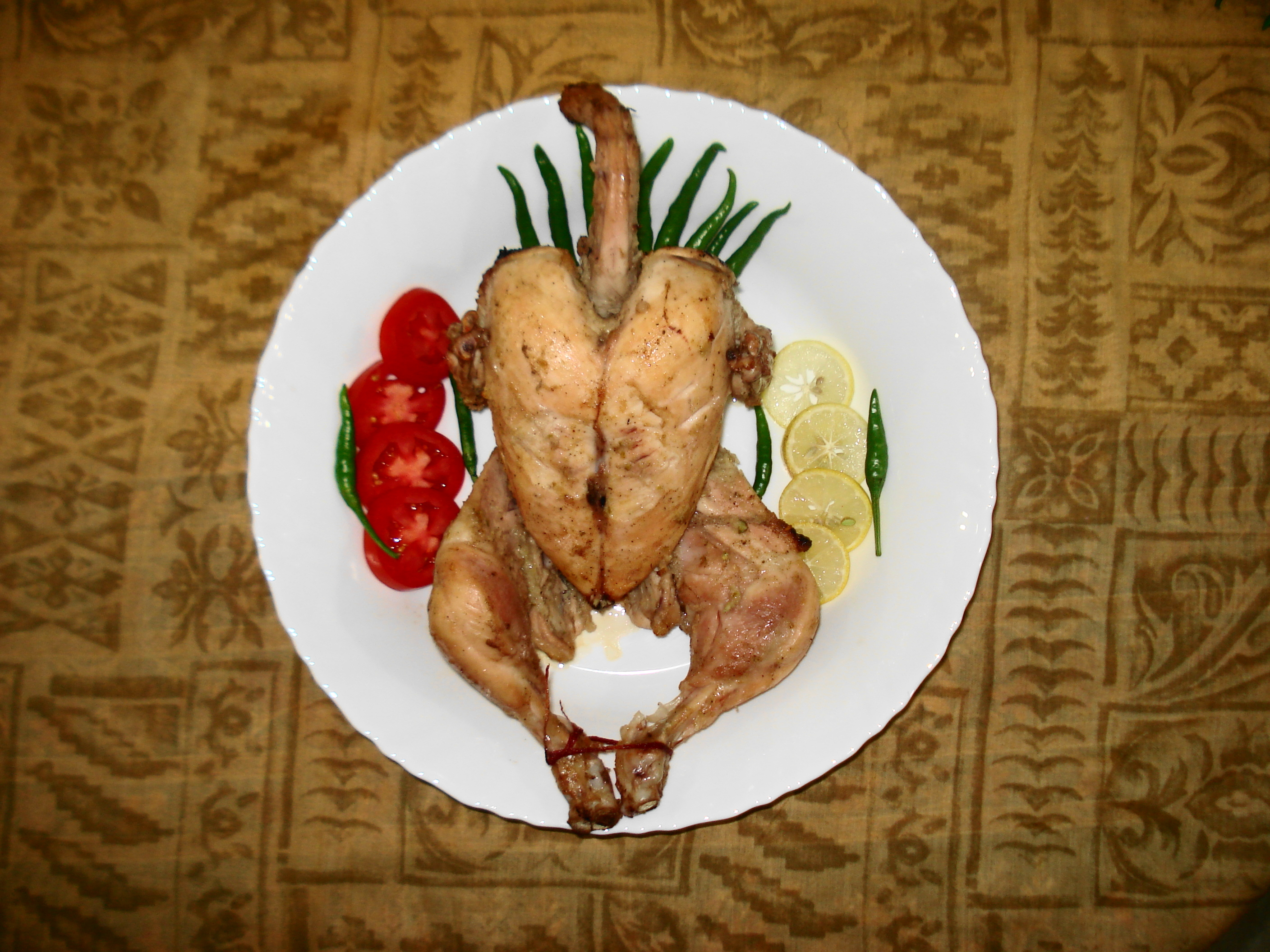
Sajji cooked dish of Balochistan

Baloch cuisine is noted for its traditional and unique food culture. Dalag is among the prominent dishes regarded by the Baloch people as a core element of their culture and identity. Sajji is familiar in other parts of the country.

== Festivals ==
Balochistan is the only state in Pakistan where the "Jashn-e-Kalat" festival is celebrated. This festival includes circus performances, rifle shooting and other cultural programs and shows. It was named after an emperor who ruled this region. The festival is celebrated to honour the diversified culture of Balochistan.

== See also ==
- Baloch folklore
- Balochi Culture
