= Duarte Barbosa =

Portuguese explorer and writer (c. 1480–1521)

- Born: c. 1480; Lisbon, Kingdom of Portugal
- Died: 1 May 1521; Rajahnate of Cebu
- Occupations: Writer, scrivener, explorer

Signature
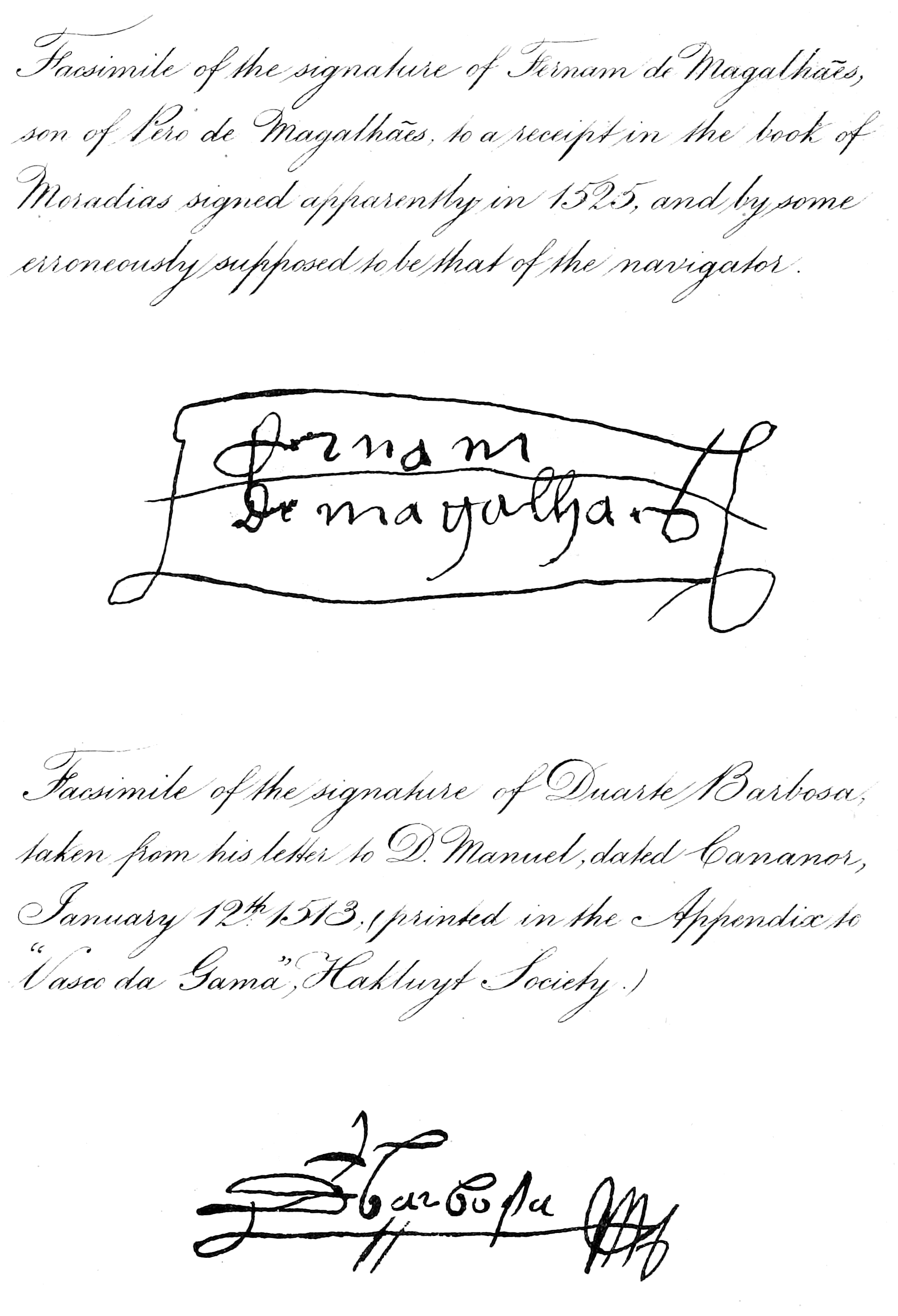

Duarte Barbosa (c. 1480 – 1 May 1521) was a Portuguese writer and officer from Portuguese India (between 1500 and 1516). He was a scrivener in a feitoria in Kochi, and an interpreter of the local language, Malayalam. Barbosa wrote the Book of Duarte Barbosa (Portuguese: Livro de Duarte Barbosa) c. 1516, making it one of the earliest examples of Portuguese travel literature.

In 1519, Barbosa embarked on the first expedition to circumnavigate the world, led by his brother-in-law Ferdinand Magellan. Barbosa was killed in 1521, at a banquet held by Rajah Humabon in the Philippines, a few days after the Battle of Mactan on Cebu Island.

== Early life ==
Barbosa's father was Diogo Barbosa. Diogo was a servant of Álvaro of Braganza, and in 1501 he went to India in a joint venture with Álvaro, Bartholomeu Marchionni, and the 3rd Portuguese India Armada (captained by João da Nova). While Diogo was away, Barbosa remained in Kochi with his uncle, Gonçalo Gil Barbosa, who worked as a factor. (Earlier, Gonçalo had traveled with the 1500 fleet of Pedro Álvares Cabral.)

== Career ==
In 1502, Gonçalo was transferred to Cannanore, and Barbosa went with him. There, Barbosa learned Malayalam, the local language. Barbosa served as the interpreter for Alfonso de Albuquerque's contact with the Rajah of Cannanore the next year (1503). In 1513, Barbosa signed a letter to King Manuel I of Portugal as Clerk of Cannanore, claiming the position of master-clerk, and the year after that (1514), Afonso de Albuquerque used Barbosa's position as an interpreter to attempt to convert the King of Kochi.

== Book of Duarte Barbosa ==
In 1515, Albuquerque sent Barbosa to Kozhikode to oversee the construction of two ships that would serve on an expedition to the Red Sea under the new governor. Barbosa returned to Portugal and completed his manuscript, Book of Duarte Barbosa. According to Italian writer Giovanni Battista Ramusio's preface, Barbosa completed his manuscript in 1516 with detailed accounts of foreign cultures. Previously known only through the testimony of Ramusio, the original manuscript was discovered and published in the early 19th century in Lisbon, Portugal.

== Circumnavigation with Magellan ==
Displeased by his position, Barbosa joined several Portuguese meeting in Seville in southern Spain. Diogo had followed D. Álvaro of Braganza into exile in Seville where Álvaro had become mayor, where Diogo became governor of the castle of Seville. In 1516, Ferdinand Magellan moved to Seville and befriended Diogo, both having traveled to India. Soon, Magellan married Barbosa's sister Beatriz, becoming Duarte Barbosa's brother in law, strengthening the links between the Barbosa and Magellan families.

On 10 August 1519 Duarte Barbosa sailed from Seville on Magellan's voyage of circumnavigation, along with his friend João Serrão. His curiosity led him to leave the expedition for the company of locals several times during the voyage, to Magellan's annoyance. Magellan even came to arrest him. On 2 April 1520, however, the help of Duarte Barbosa was crucial to facing down a riot in Puerto San Julian (Argentina), and thereafter Barbosa become captain of the Victoria. According to Antonio Pigafetta's account, after Magellan's death on 27 April 1521 at the Battle of Mactan (Philippines), Barbosa was one of the few survivors of the battle and was made co-commander of the expedition along with João Serrão. Barbosa tried to recover Magellan's body without success. He tried to land Enrique of Malacca, but gave up. Despite the manumission he was entitled to according to Magellan's will made before departure, Duarte Barbosa or João Serrão then threatened to enslave him to Magellan's widow. The fear of Enrique has since been considered an argument for him conspiring with Rajah Humabon. On 1 May 1521, all were invited by the rajah to a banquet ashore near Cebu, the Philippines, to receive a gift for the king of Spain. There, Barbosa and many others were killed. João Serrão was brought by natives who wanted to exchange him for weapons, but was left behind and was saved by the pilot João Carvalho. Enrique disappeared.

== Bibliography ==
- Duarte Barbosa, Mansel Longworth Dames, (1518) "The book of Duarte Barbosa: an account of the countries bordering on the Indian Ocean and their inhabitants", Asian Educational Services, 1989, ISBN 81-206-0451-2
- Stanley, Henry E. J. ed. and trans. (1866). A description of the coasts of East Africa and Malabar by Duarte Barbosa. London: Hakluyt Society.
- Dames, Mansel Longworth (1918–1921). The book of Duarte Barbosa : an account of the countries bordering on the Indian Ocean and their inhabitants (2 Volumes). London: Hakluyt Society. OCLC 3640216.
