= Mir Chakar Khan Rind University =

Public university in Balochistan, Pakistan

- دانشگاه میرچاکرخان ریند میر چاکر خان رند پوهنتون جامع میر چاکر خان رند
- Type: Public
- Established: 2019
- Affiliations: Higher Education Commission (Pakistan)
- Chancellor: Governor of Balochistan
- Vice-Chancellor: Prof. Dr. Syed Mushtaq Ahmad Shah
- Location: Sibi, Balochistan, Pakistan
- Nickname: MCKRU
- Website: mckru.edu.pk

The Mir Chakar Khan Rind University (MCKRU) is a public university located in Sibi, Balochistan, Pakistan.

== History ==
It was established in 2019. The university was named after a Baloch folk hero Mir Chakar Khan Rind.
