= Mir Chakar Khan Rind University of Technology =

Public university in Dera Ghazi Khan District, Punjab, Pakistan

- میر چاکر خان رند یونیورسٹی
- Type: Public
- Established: 2019
- Affiliations: Higher Education Commission (Pakistan), National Technology Council (Pakistan)
- Chancellor: Governor of the Punjab
- Vice-Chancellor: Prof. Dr. Mehmood Saleem
- Location: Dera Ghazi Khan, Punjab, Pakistan
- Nickname: MCUT
- Website: mcut.edu.pk

The Mir Chakar Khan Rind University of Technology (Balochi: میر چاکر خان رند یونیورسٹی) is a public university located in Dera Ghazi Khan District, Punjab, Pakistan. It was named after a Baloch folk hero Mir Chakar Khan Rind.

In this University there are many faculties related to engineering too.
