= Mir Chakar Rind =

Baloch chieftain (1468–1565)

Mir Chakar Khan Rind مير چاکرخان رند

Baloch Confederacy
- Reign: 1487–1511
- Successor: Shahdad Rind
- Born: 1468; Ashaal, Kolowa, Makran, Balochistan
- Died: 1565 (aged 96–97); Satghara, Punjab
- Burial: Tomb of Mir Chakar, Satghara, Punjab
- Issue: Shahdad, Shahzad
- House: Rind
- Father: Shayhak
- Religion: Islam
- Military career
- Allegiance: Rind Confederacy
- Conflicts: Rind-Lashari War

Chakar Khan Rind (Balochi: میر چاکَر خان رِند) was a 15th-century Baloch chieftain. Born in Ashal, located in the Kolwah region of eastern Makran, he founded the "Kingdom of Balochistan". He is considered a folk hero of the Baloch people and an important figure in the Baloch epic Hani and Sheh Mureed.

== Family ==
According to Baloch history, Chakar Rind is a descendant of Rind Khan, a son of Jalal Khan, from whom a number of Baloch descend. His father was Mir Shayhak Rind. Mir Chakar Rind's home town is still debated among Baloch historian however, he is believed to be born in Kolwah, a region of Makran, Balochistan.

== History ==
Around 1487, Mir Chakar succeeded his father as the Sardar-i Azam (Great Chief). Under his leadership, Sibi was established as the capital of the first unified Baloch kingdom, which at its peak stretched from Kerman in the west to the Sindh border in the east, and from southern Khorasan to the Arabian Sea coast.

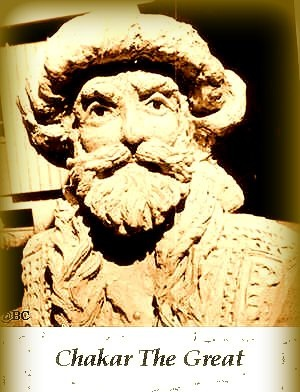
Mir Chakar Khan Rind

Since 12th century Baloch chieftains ruled over most of Balochistan. Mir Jalal khan and Mir Chakar after the establishment of the Baloch Confederation extended their dominance beyond the borders of Balochistan.

Mir Chakar Khan Rind was among the leading chiefs of the Baloch and is credited with directing their expansion into Sindh and the Punjab. At the height of his power he controlled territory ranging from the uplands of Kalat and the plains of Kacchi to wide areas of northern Sindh and southern Punjab, including the Sahiwal region.

Groups of Baloch, including clans of the Rind tribe, migrated during the time of Mir Chakar from the region of Sibi into Punjab, settling along the valleys of the Chenab, Ravi, and Sutlej rivers. Their presence in the region became notable, and by 1519 Babur, the founder of the Mughal Empire, encountered Baloch groups in Punjab and allied with them. This practice continued during the reign of Humayun. Earlier, during the era of Husseyn Langah (1469–1502), Baloch groups had been granted jagirs as military allies.

The Baloch fought alongside the Mughal forces in India during Humayun’s 1555 campaign to recapture Delhi. Mir Chakar is said to have led military expeditions into Multan and the Punjab.

Mir Chakar then settled in Satghara, Punjab and gained power and respect in the area. Sher Shah Suri sent a message to Mir Chakar to unite with him and consolidate his gains. Mir Chakar appreciated the offer but refused to help Sher Shah Suri. Under the command of his son, Mir Shahdad Khan, his forces instead joined the Mughal army of Humayun after a long exile in Persia. Humayun came back, recaptured Delhi, and ousted the Suri dynasty in 1556. As a reward, Emperor Humayun conferred a vast Jagir (lands), including horses and slaves, to Mir Chakar. He ruled this territory until he died in 1565. People who accompanied Mir Chakar to Satghara after leaving Balochistan constructed a tomb for his body. Meer Chakar Rind is considered a Baloch hero.

=== The Rind–Lashari Wars ===
Mir Chakar became the head of Rind tribe at the age of 18 after the death of his father Mir Shehaq Rind. Mir Chakar's fiefdom was short-lived because of the great civil war between the Lashari and Rind tribes of Balochistan. Mir Chakar as head of his tribe went to war, which resulted in thousands dying. The war and the gallantry of the two tribes' leaders continues to be a part of the Baloch history. After the "Thirty Years' War" against the Lashari Tribe. During this period, Mir Chakar Rind and Mir Gwahram Khan Lashari led the two most influential clans. A dispute over control of the fertile lands in Kacchi and Sibi escalated into a prolonged tribal war that continued for nearly thirty years.

Mir Chakar eventually defeated the Gwahram Khan, forcing them to leave the region, but the conflict left his own forces exhausted. As he struggled to retain control of Sibi, a new threat emerged from the Arghun rulers of Kandahar. After a difficult battle against Shah Beg Arghun.

== Historical documents ==
According to Tarikh-i-Farishtah, Mir Chakar Rind was a holder of large jāgir and commanded hordes of warriors in the area. Tarikh-i-Sher Shahi gives his name as Chakur Rind correctly, according to Mansel Longworth Dames.

== Eponymous institutions ==
Following two institutions, one in Balochistan and other in Punjab, are named after him:

- Mir Chakar Khan Rind University, Luni, Sibi
- Mir Chakar Khan Rind University of Technology, Dera Ghazi Khan
