= Hoth Khan Baloch =

King Hoth Baloch
- Known for: Being the former leader of the Baloch people
- Predecessor: Jalal Khan
- Children: Mir Aali, Mir Khosag (son), many possibly more...
- Father: Jalal Khan
- Family: Rind Khan (brother) Lashar Khan (brother) Kora Khan (brother) Bibi Jato (sister) Mir Ali (uncle) Mir Nos (uncle) Mir Aalii (son) Mir Dostein Hoth (grandson)

Hoth Khan Baloch, also known as Hoath Khan Baloch, was a ruler of what is now Balochistan and one of the four sons of Jalal Khan, He was one of the five founding members of the five main Baloch divisions/tribes. The Hoth and Khosag are the direct descendants of Hoth Khan. He ruled Balochistan around 1200 CE.

== Family ==
As the son of Jalal Khan, Hoth Khan was the brother of the founders of the other Balochi tribes founders, namely Rind Khan, Lashar, Korai, and Bibi Jato. He was the son of Ajooba, the second wife of Mir Jalal Khan. Mir Jalal Khan died, and when his body was taken to the cemetery for burial, his young wife, Ajooba Bibi, declared her young son, Hot, the rightful heir of the state and closed the city gates. Upon returning, they found the city gates closed. It was deemed inappropriate to fight against the stepmother and younger brother. So, they set up a temporary shelter outside and performed the ritual of Fatiha there.

The folklore tale of Sassui Punnhun describes Hoth Khan as the grandfather of Mir Punnhun Khan (Mir Dostein Hoth), whose father was Hoth Khan's son Mir Aalii.

.

== Descendants ==
- Ahmed bin Mahmoud, Emirati political advisor
- Saeed bin Rashid, Sheikh of the Balūch at ‘Arāqi
- Issa Al-Huoti, Emirati footballer
