= Mast Tawakali =

19th-century Baloch Sufi poet (c. 1825–1892)

- Born: Sohrab c. 1825; Manak Band, Kahan, Kohlu, Emirate of Kabul (present-day Balochistan, Pakistan)
- Died: c. 1892 (aged 66–67); Pazha, Kohlu, Baluchistan, British India (present-day Balochistan, Pakistan)
- Venerated in: Pakistanis
- Major shrine: Mast Tawakali Mazaar, Kohlu, Balochistan, Pakistan

Mast Tawakali (Balochi: مست توکلی, also romanized as Mast Taukali; c. 1825 – 1892) was a 19th century Baloch Sufi poet, mystic and reformist, who is regarded as the "Father of Balochi literature". Vocally opposed to the feudal system and the absolute rule of the tribal chiefs (sardars), he was an advocate for the underprivileged.

He was an activist against British rule of India. His anti-colonial ideology was often a subject of his poetry. He was revered as promoting a message of love, peace, tolerance, and fraternity.

== Early life and marriage ==
Tawakali was born in about 1825 in Mank Band, near Kahan in Kohlu at the time of Afghan rule over northern Balochistan. His father, Lal Khan, named him Sohrab, but later, this name was changed because it because of its alleged infringement on that of their ruler. He belonged to the Loharani (Sherani) branch of the Marri tribe. Before writing poetry, he was a shepherd.

At the age of 28 he saw woman named Samoo, when seeking refuge from a storm, upon seeing her it is reported that he fell in love, immediately. After that night, he spent his entire life like a vagabond and known as Mast Tawakali meaning "Nobody cares" and started his poetry.

It became his routine to sit near the same hamlet once and again to catch a glimpse of Samoo. Over this, the villagers turned harsh to him and asked him not to visit the same hamlet again and again, but this word did not have an effect on Mast. Having become tired of Tawakali, Samoo's husband took her and left the village forever. After this, in his eyes, Mast had no purpose as he could not see his beloved Samoo, any longer. He devoted his life to God and spent his most of his life in a shrine composing poetry and praying for Samoo.

Dr. Shah Muhammad Marri writes, "Mast was a mystic and a great lover. Once, the husband of Samoo, along with other villagers, wanted to kill him to get rid of him. They pushed him from a hilltop, with wonders, nothing happened to him. Once a train was on the way track, the track was broken that the train had no information about this and reaching nearer to the broken-track position, the train stopped because Mast had blown a red scarf."

== Later years and death ==
He left everything for his love and started poetry. This love of human being ascends to God, thus he went from virtual love to spiritual love. Mast Tawakali is the greatest Sufi poet of Balochi language and his poetry is closely attached to the suffering of common men. His poetry carried a message of peace, love, tolerance and brotherhood. Mast Tawakali lived his whole life in search of truth and love. He was not only an eminent poet of Balochi but also a great Sufi of the era. As Sufis believe that by purifying their hearts they get close to God. For him, Samoo's love was the pathway to get there. Sufis say that they see the divine presence in everything. Mast Taukali found it in Samoo. He says in a stanza:

نندون کاہان آ بیثغوں کوہانی مری"

"وا رضا بیثو ،بہانغے سمو اے کثئی

" Nindo;n Kahan a Bisagho'n Kohaani Marri; Wa Razi Beeso Bahanaghe Samoo e Kuth ey" (I am an ordinary Marri of Kahan, not speak of my status, It was God and His acceptance I earned, Samoo was a mere means). He died at the age of 67, some 27 years after Samoo's death.

== Shrine ==
He died in 1892 at Pazza, Kohlu. He was buried in Mast Maidan Gari, District Kohlu, Balochistan. There is Tomb of Mast Tawakali as you enter the shrine. A mosque has also built on the compound.
