= Ghulam Mohammad Lalzad Baloch =

- Born: 20 March 1951 (age 75); Zaranj, Nimroz, Afghanistan
- Occupations: Journalist and writer
- Years active: 1974–present
- Website: www.facebook.com/baloch.lalzad (Facebook)

Ghulam Mohammad Lalzad Baloch or Lalzad Baloch (Balochi: گُلام مھمد لالزاد بلۏچ) is a Baluchi language broadcast journalist, based in Toronto, Canada. He is originally from Nimroz Afghanistan. He was with the Baluchi service of All India Radio from 1974 to 2003.

== Early life ==
His attended Farokhi school in Zaranj, Nimroz, Noon. He studied law and political science at Kabul University (Department of Justice) and earned a PhD in literature (She'r e Ma'sir e Dari in Afghanistan) from Jamia Millia Islamia University, Delhi.

== Career ==
He joined Radio Afghanistan as a university student. from 1972 to 1974, he worked with All India Radio's Balochi service from 1974 to 2003. He runs two news services. He also works with Hamwatan Translation Company.

== See also ==
- Nimruz Province
- Baloch people
- Balochi language
- Balochi literature
