= Saba Dashtyari =

Pakistani academic (1954-2011

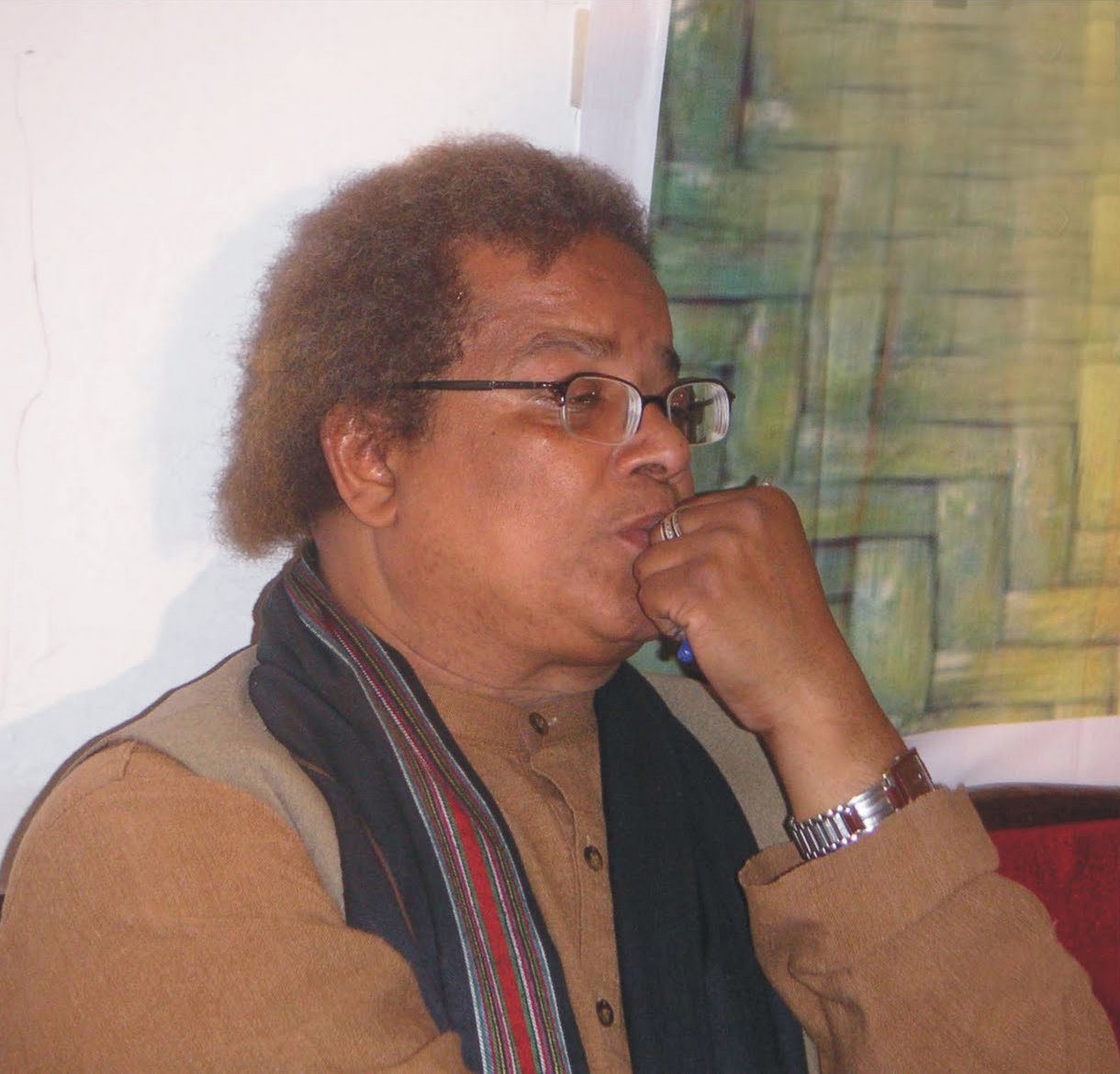
- Born: 1953; Karachi, Pakistan
- Died: June 1, 2011; Quetta, Pakistan
- Cause of death: Gunshot wound
- Occupation: Professor of Islamic studies

Ghulam Hussain Saba Dashtyari (1954 – 1 June 2011) (Balochi: صبا دشتیاری بلوچ) commonly known as "Saba Dashtyari", was a professor of Islamic Studies at the University of Balochistan in Quetta, Balochistan.

== Early life ==
Dashtyari was born to middle class family in 1953 in Lyari district of Karachi, Pakistan. Belonging to the Sheedi community, his paternal ancestors hailed from East Africa, who were brought to the subcontinent during the Indian Ocean slave trade. His family maintained ties with relatives in Zanzibar and Dar es Salaam in present-day Tanzania. Dashtyari's elder brother Ghulam Abbas Baloch was an international footballer who represented the Pakistan national football team. Banjo musician Bilawal Belgium also belonged to Dashtyari's family.

He received Master of Arts degrees in Philosophy and Islamic Studies. He was fluent in Urdu, English, Persian and Arabic.

== Career ==
Dashtyari giving a lecture.

Dashtyari was a teacher of Islamic Studies at the Balochistan University and frequently shuttled between Karachi and Quetta.

His literary contributions include more than 24 books on Balochi literature, history, poetry and translations. He also established the Syed Zahoor Shah Hashmi reference library, library on Balochi literature, in Malir area of Karachi.

The library houses more than 150,000 books in various languages on Balochi literature, culture and civilisation. Furthermore, he also compiled an index and bibliography of Balochi literature published in the past 50 years.

== Death ==
On Wednesday 1 June 2011, Dashtyari was badly wounded when an unidentified assailant opened fire on him. He was rushed to hospital but died of his injuries.
