= Syed Zahoor Shah Hashmi =

Pakistani poet and philosopher (1926–1978)

Sayad Zahoor Shah Hashmi PP
- سید زھور شاہ ھاشمی سید ظہور شاہ ہاشمی
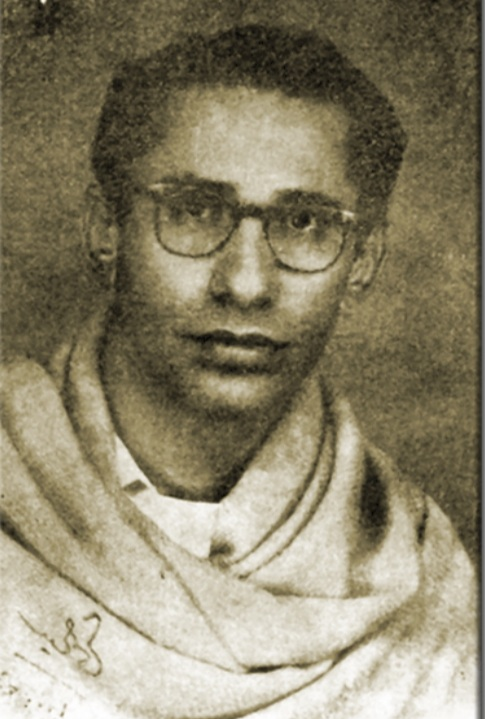
- A picture of Syed Hashmi
- Born: 21 April 1926; Gwadar, Sultanate of Muscat and Oman (present-day Balochistan, Pakistan)
- Died: 4 March 1978 (aged 51); Karachi, Sindh, Pakistan
- Spouse: Mumtaz Bibi (m. 1969)
- Children: 3

Education
- Education: University of the Punjab

Philosophical work
- Era: 20th-century philosophy
- Language: Balochi, Urdu, Persian and Arabic
- Main interests: Poetry; Literature; Philosophy
- Notable works: Sayad Gunj (1st Dictionary of Balochi language); Balochi Zuban-o-Adab ki tareekh (An Urdu language research book “Balochi language and literature’s history”); Juz-Amma (Balochi Translation of last part of the Holy Quran); Balochi Syahag-a-rast nibisag (Based on pattern and grammar of the Balochi language); Balochi Bungiji (Beginners’ Balochi); Nazuk (Novel); Trap kane’n trump (poetry); Angar-o-trungal (poetry); Shakale’n Shahju (poetry); Britkage’n beer (poetry); Sistage’n dastonk (poetry); Balochi Urdu Bol Chal (based on Balochi and Urdu language Speech); Sichkan’en sassa (poetry); Sayad Namdi (Syed’s letters); Shah Lachakar (A research Book); Mir Gind (Short Story); Gisad Gwar (poetry)
- Website: sayadganj.albaloch.com

Syed Zahoor Shah Hashmi PP (Balochi: سید زھور شاہ ھاشمی; Urdu: سید ظہور شاہ ہاشمی; 21 April 1926 – 4 March 1978), commonly known as Syed Hashmi (Balochi, Urdu: سید ہاشمی), was a Pakistani Balochi-language poet, scholar, writer and philosopher who is widely considered one of the most important figures in Balochi language and Balochi literature. He wrote in Balochi, Urdu, Persian and Arabic. Hashmi was posthumously awarded the prestigious Pride of Performance award by the government of Pakistan for his contribution in the field of literature.

== Early life and education ==
Hashmi was born on 21 April 1926 in Gwadar, Sultanate of Muscat and Oman into a Baloch Syed family of Arab descent tracing their lineage to the Bani Hashim clan, to which the Islamic prophet Muhammad belonged. At the time of his birth, Gwadar was ruled by Oman, it was bought by Pakistan in 1958.

After completing his early education, he studied at the University of the Punjab in Lahore. He was influenced by the work of Muhammad Iqbal and Rumi.

== Contribution to Balochi language ==
Hashmi is well known for his contributions to the Balochi literature. One of his most recognized work is "Sayad Gunj", the first ever Balochi language dictionary. He also wrote several books on Balochi language and its literature's history in Urdu and Balochi. His works also include novels, short stories and translations.

== Books ==
Syed Zahoor Shah Hashmi authored several important works on Balochi literature, linguistics, and regional history. His books are frequently cited in Balochi literary histories, academic research, and university curricula. His most widely documented works include:

- Diwan-e-Hashmi – A collection of Balochi poetry.
- Tareekh-e-Makran – A historical study of the Makran region.
- Sayyadon ki Tareekh-e-Makran – A historical account of Sayyid families in Makran.
- Balochi Zaban-o-Adab ki Tareekh – A scholarly work on the history of the Balochi language and its literature.
- Balochi Lughat – A lexical work contributing to the documentation of Balochi vocabulary.

In addition to these books, Hashmi wrote numerous articles, essays, and research papers, including literary criticism and historical studies, which played a significant role in the intellectual revival of Balochi language and scholarship.
