= Carina Jahani =

Swedish academic

- Born: 1959 (age 66–67); Småland, Sweden
- Education: Uppsala University (PhD)
- Occupation: Professor of Iranian languages
- Scientific career
- Fields: Balochi language; Balochi literature; Iranian languages
- Workplaces: Uppsala University
- Thesis: Standardization and Script System in the Balochi Language (1989 (37 years ago))

Carina Jahani (Note: Balochi: کارینا جہانی, Persian: کارینا جهانی) is a Swedish linguist and Iranologist who works as a professor of Iranian languages at Uppsala University (UU).

Her academic career has focused on the study of Iranian languages, with a particular focus on the Balochi language. Her research and publications highlight the linguistic, historical, and socio-political aspects of the Baloch people and language. Due to her research and services in the field of the Balochi language, Jahani has been given the title of "the stepdaughter of Balochistan".

== Early life and career ==
Born in 1959, in the province of Småland in southern Sweden, Jahani attended the University of Uppsala (UU) in Uppsala, receiving a PhD in 1989 with a thesis titled Standardization and Script System in the Balochi Language.

Jahani's interest in Iranian languages began at a young age during her travels and interactions with different cultures. Her first visit to Iran was in 1978, shortly before the 1979 Iranian Revolution. She went to Iran as member of a Christian student organisation and stayed there from September 1979 until the war started and then she moved to Pakistan and continued learning Persian in Pakistan.

She was told to learn Urdu instead of Persian, but lacked interest in Urdu and other Indo-Aryan languages of Pakistan. After the 1979 Islamic Revolution, Jahani studied at the University of Tehran (UT) for a year, but left Iran due to the outbreak of the Iran–Iraq War. Abdolhossein Zarrinkoob was one of her professors while studying at the University of Tehran (UT) and she studied on European literature during his presence in Iran.

She made three trips to Pakistan from October 1994 to 2007 and became familiar with the Balochi language. She began researching the Balochi language and conducted research in the field of Baloch studies and poet Gul Khan Nasir from Balochistan, the bilingualism or even trilingualism of Baloch children growing up in Sweden and the role of these languages in their lives, as well as the structure of the Baloch dialects common in Iran, namely the Saravani and Makrani dialects, and the influence of the Persian language on these dialects.

== Career and research ==
Jahani cites her interest and fascination with the Balochi language to the oral literature, myths, and instructive stories hidden in the hearts of the old men and women of this ancient land. She found speaking the Balochi language sweet and attractive.

Jahani's work encompasses language documentation, revitalization efforts for endangered languages, and human rights issues related to linguistic minorities. She is particularly noted for her contributions to the study of Balochi and Persian languages. Jahani has written numerous publications that explore various dimensions of Iranian languages.

Some of her notable works include:

- A Grammar of Modern Standard Balochi
- The Baloch and Others
- The Balochi Language and Languages in Iranian Balochistan (2013)
- Standardization and Orthography in the Balochi Language

Jahani teaches Balochi at Uppsala University (UU) and provides a basic knowledge of Balochi phonetics and syntax. The course also includes a brief overview of the history of the Baloch people.

== See also ==
- List of female scientists in the 20th century
- List of female scientists in the 21st century
- List of linguists
- List of Swedish scientists
- List of Swedish writers
