= Balochi handicrafts =

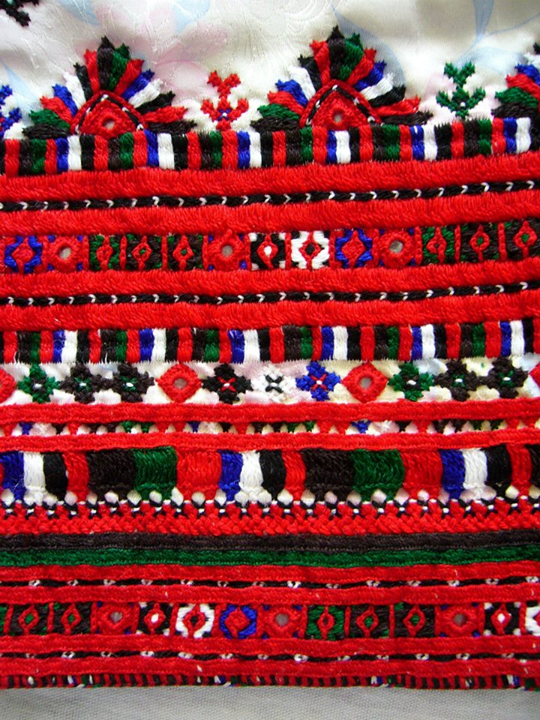
Example of Baloch needlework

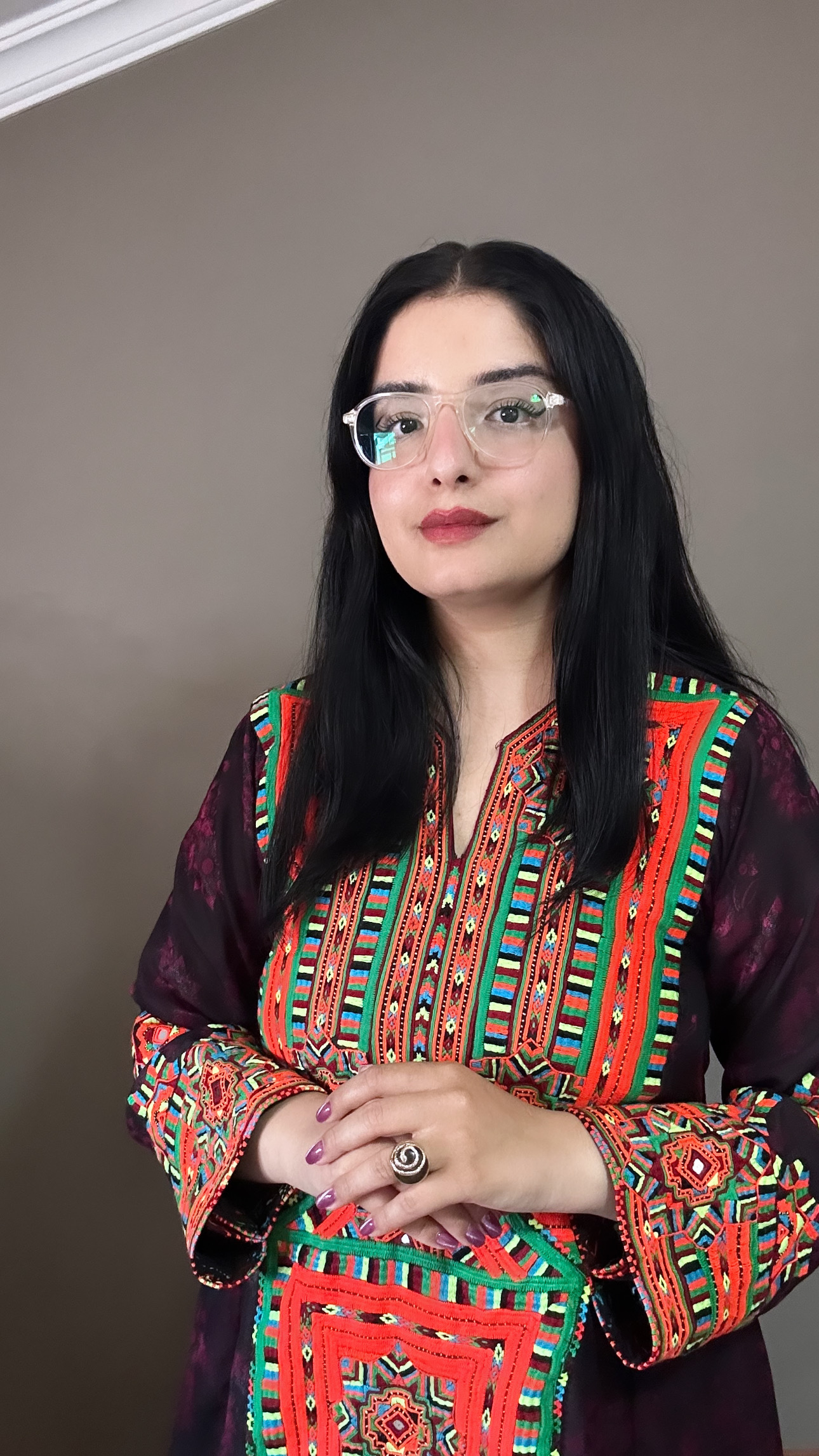
Baloch women in traditional dress

Balochi handicrafts (Balochi: بلۏچی هانڈیکرافٹز), are handicraft or handmade crafted works originating from Baloch people.

Balochi handicrafts is not merely a craft; it serves as a means of cultural identity and expression. Each design often carries symbolic meanings related to Baloch traditions and beliefs.

Handicrafts are part of Balochi culture and play an important role in the family economy, as an occupation that is particularly prevalent among Baloch nomads. Women often engage in these handicrafts to support their families, especially in rural areas where educational and employment opportunities are limited.

The tradition of crafting these items is passed down through generations, preserving the cultural heritage of the Baloch community.

== Needlework ==
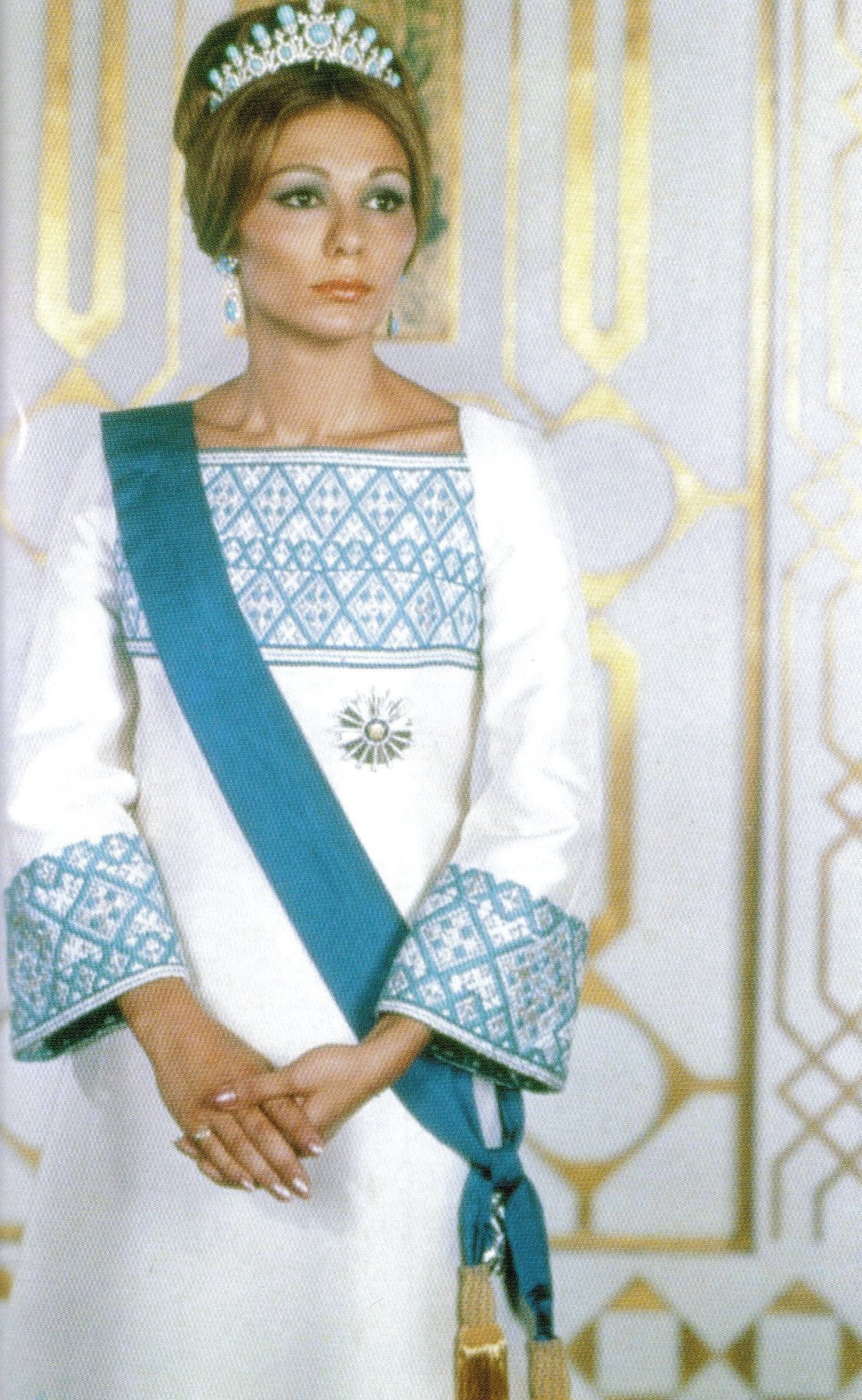
Empress Farah Pahlavi wearing a dress with Baloch needlework, 1972

Balochi needlework is a rich and intricate art form that reflects the cultural heritage of the Baloch people. It utilizes numerous needlework techniques to create various patterns and designs, often incorporating vibrant colors and unique motifs.

Balochi needlework is used on clothing, in some sources, the beginning of this art is 100 to 200 years prior the spread of Islam, and the available evidence indicates that this method of sewing has been common among the Baloch people since the beginning of Islam, and in the Ilkhanate era—especially the Timurid and Safavid eras—reached its peak.

Traditional Baloch needlework uses organic materials such as cotton, silk, and wool.

Threads are often hand-dyed using natural pigments derived from plants and minerals, contributing to the depth of color in the designs. Decorative elements like mirrors, crystals, and sequins are also incorporated to enhance visual appeal. The embroidery is traditionally performed by women, providing them with a source of income while preserving their cultural heritage.

The embroidery features a variety of geometric and floral patterns that reflect the region's history and cultural influences. Each piece is considered unique, often taking days or weeks to complete due to the meticulous nature of the work. Recent interest in Balochi embroidery has led to its incorporation into contemporary fashion, maintaining traditional techniques while innovating new designs.

Notable Baloch needlework artisans include Mahtab Norouzi. Farah Pahlavi, the former Shahbanu of Iran, was particularly drawn to Balochi needlework handcrafts and incorporated them into many of her formal dresses. In the 1960s, Mehr Monir Jahanbani—renowned for her traditional craftsmanship—discovered intricate Balochi needlework and immediately recognized its potential as a fashion statement. Collaborating with designer Keyvan Khosrovani, Jahanbani began incorporating the embroidery into contemporary designs, blending it seamlessly with modern aesthetics. Their collaborative efforts culminated in a series of stunning royal dresses for Empress Farah Pahlavi, where the Balochi needlework became an iconic decorative element.

== Mirror work embroidery ==
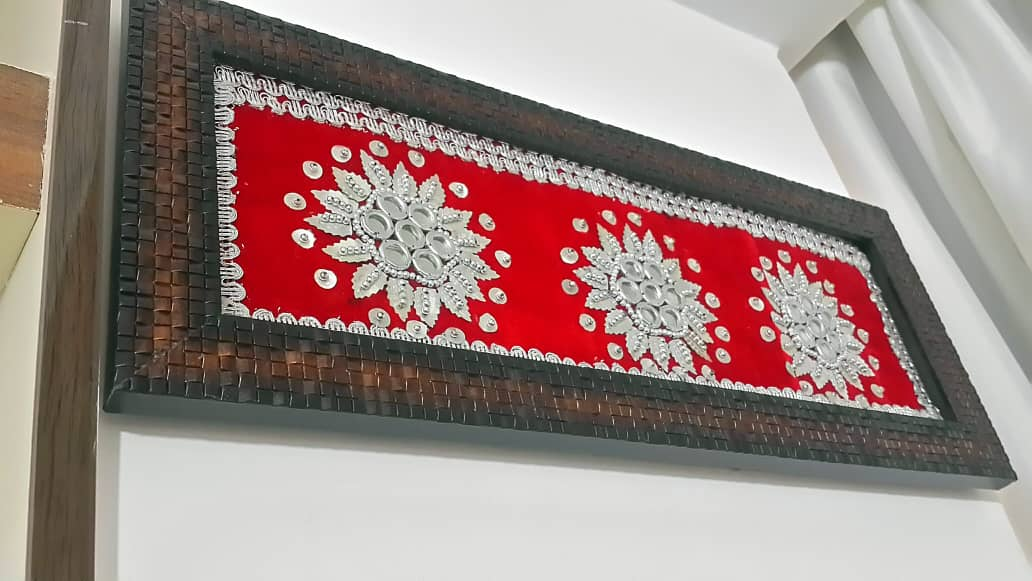
An example of Baloch mirror embroidery

Mirror work embroidery is a type of traditional Balochi embroidery and art that is used to decorate coats, cloth, headress (paag), local clothing between Baloch of Afghanistan, Pakistan, and Iran.

The artistic aspects of sewing these types of mirrors can be used in some cases to decorate some items such as cushions, tablecloths, bags, etc. Mirror work embroidery is also used on local clothes, vests, belts, and wall hangings.

It is used in at least twenty-four Balochi embroidery motifs. In some motifs such as Setareh (ستاره), Kap o Naal (کپ ءُ نال), and Gol Kandi (گل کندی), the mirror is associated with light and brightness, and in others such as Harir, Tak Zarapshan, and Gol it is associated with water and prosperity. It seems that in some examples such as Cham Mozheh (چم مژه), Koh Bandar (کوه بندر), and Koh Sar Asheq (کوه سر عاشق); concepts such as love, martyrdom, and sacrifice are used, and in some such as Morwarid (مروارید), Nah Adinki (نہ آدینکی), and Cham Ahog (چم آهوگ), and purity are specifically implied.

In contrast, in a few examples such as Sherin Jenk (شرین جنک) and Dezh (دژ), only the appearance and splendor caused by the shimmering light in the mirror are displayed as a symbol of power and strength.

== Coin work embroidery ==
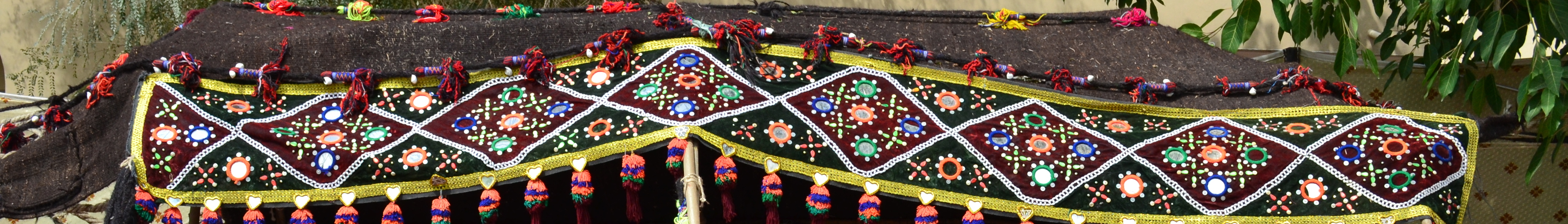
An example of Baloch coin embroidery on a banner

Coin work embroidery is one of the handicrafts of the Baloch that the Baloch generally use to decorate bedspreads or hung under a camel's head during ceremonies, and are often hung on the wall to decorate rooms. Balochi coin embroidery is very popular among the Baloch people in Iran and has created a large market and exported outside Balochistan.

There are two types of coin embroidery: one is made to hang and often has a set of diamond, square, and triangle shapes. For this purpose, the fabric is selected in the desired shapes, and according to one's taste, white buttons are sewn on it in a very beautiful way, and small and large mirrors and sequins are placed between the sewn buttons, creating a unique shape.

== Rugs and carpets ==
Balochi rugs are typically eight feet in length, which made them lighter and easier to transport. Their material typically includes wool or a mixture of wool and goat hair; newer carpets have a warp made of cotton and sturdy wool pile rugs.

These rugs are renowned for their intricate designs, durability, and use of natural materials. often used for the warp (the vertical threads), providing a sturdy foundation for the rug. Goat and camel hair are occasionally incorporated for added texture and durability.

The weaving process can take several months, with artisans often working on horizontal looms. Commonly feature geometric shapes such as hexagons, triangles, and rectangles.

These motifs showcase the artistic vision of the weavers. Designs often include camel prints and 'gul' repeat medallions, reflecting the significance of camels to the nomadic lifestyle of the Baloch tribes. Traditional colors include deep reds, blues, and browns, achieved using natural dyes from local plants.

== Gallery ==
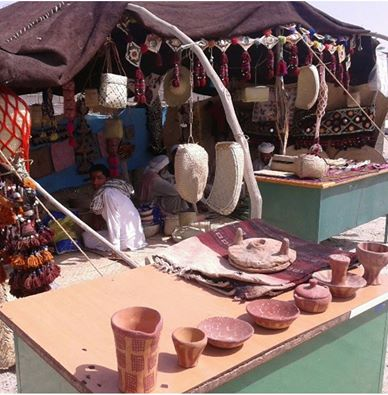
Balochi handicrafts

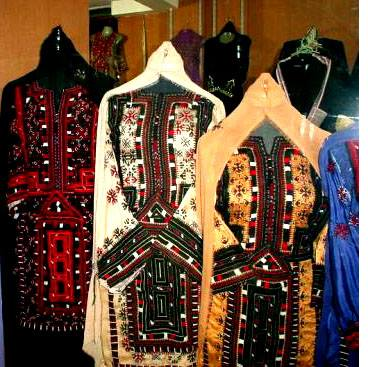
Balochi dress with Balochi embroidery

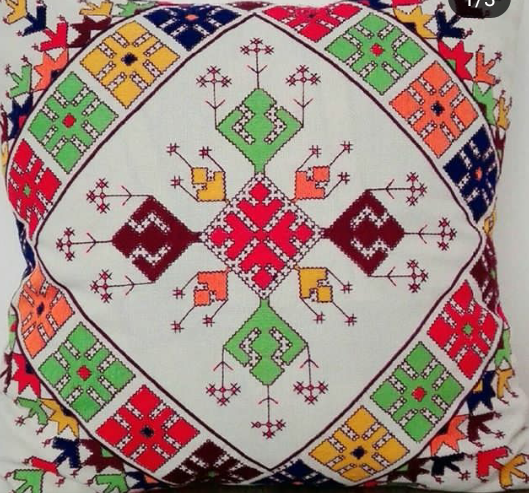
A Balochi embroidered cushion

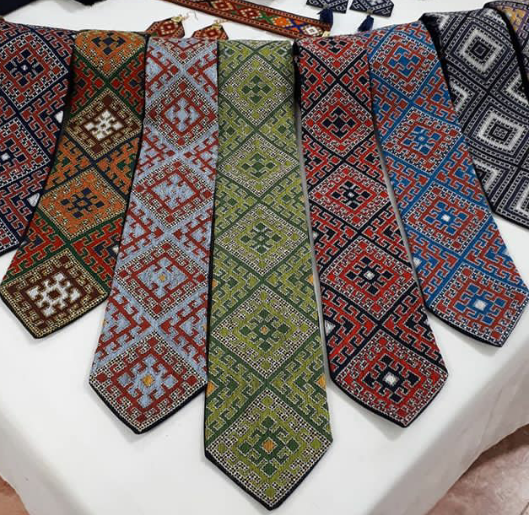
Balochi embroidered ties

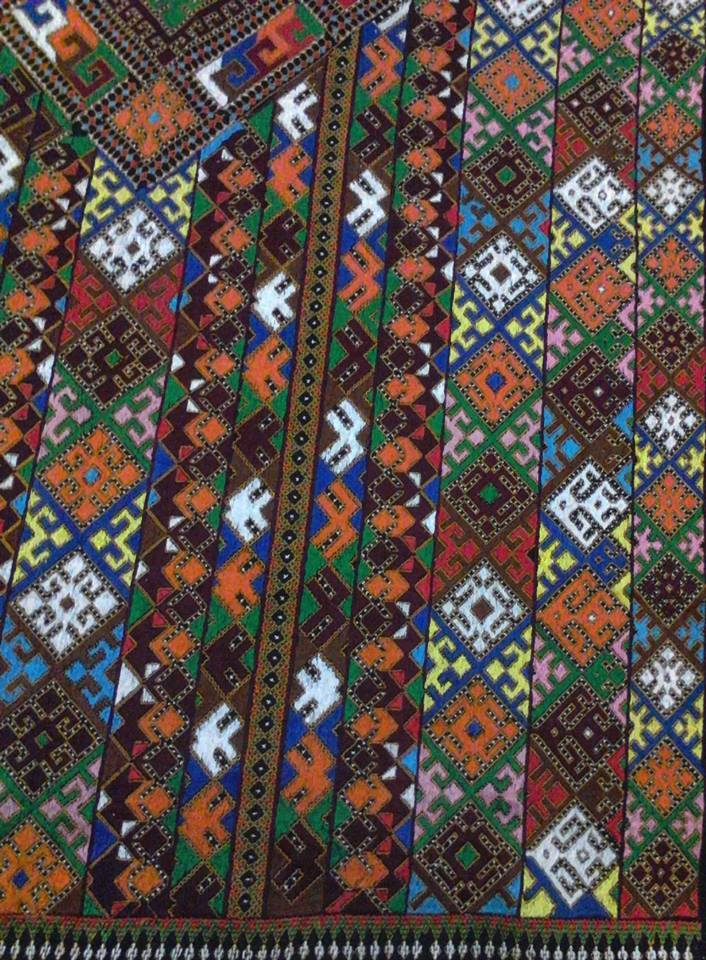
Balochi dress with Balochi embroidery

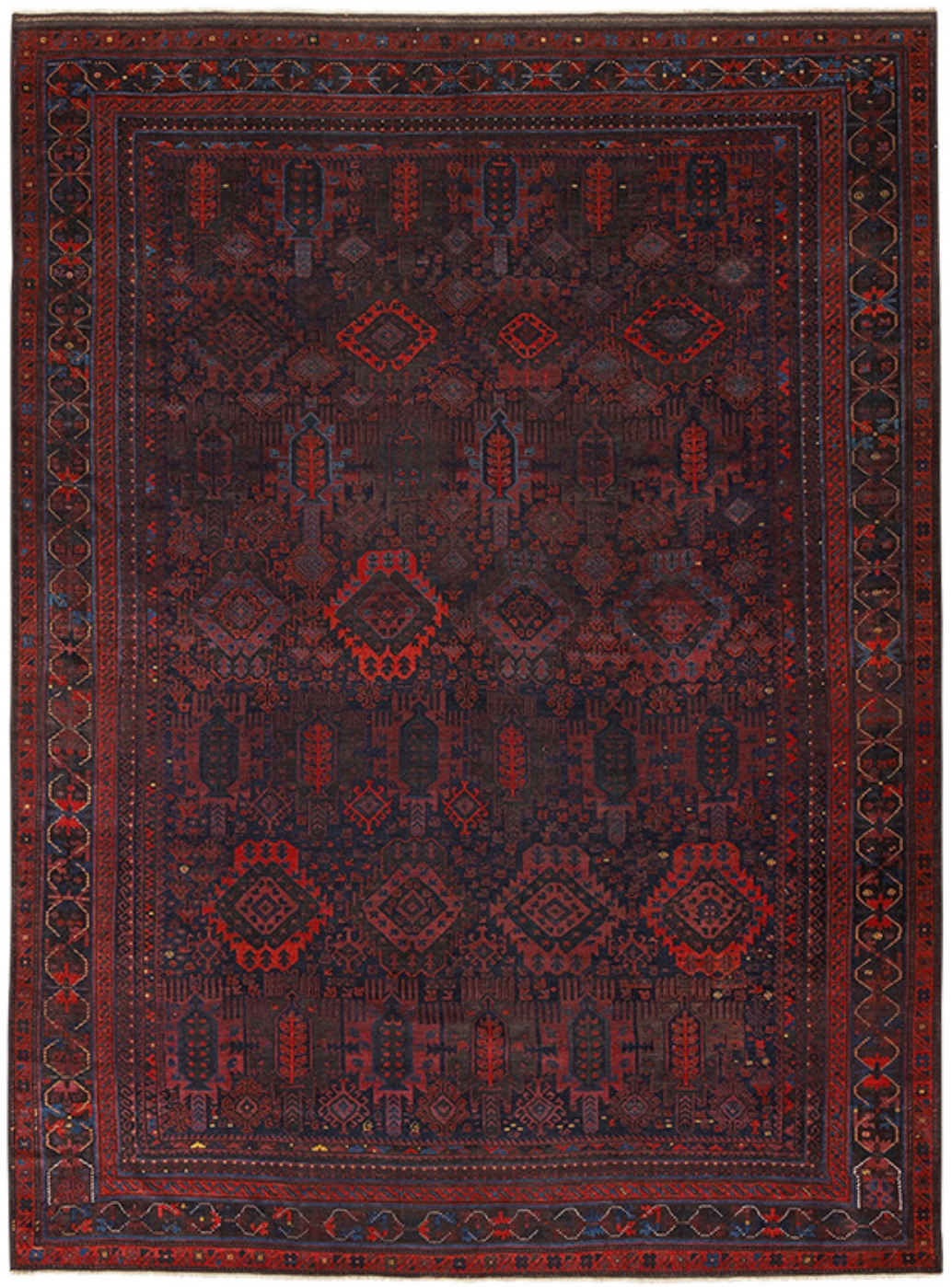
An example of a Balochi rug

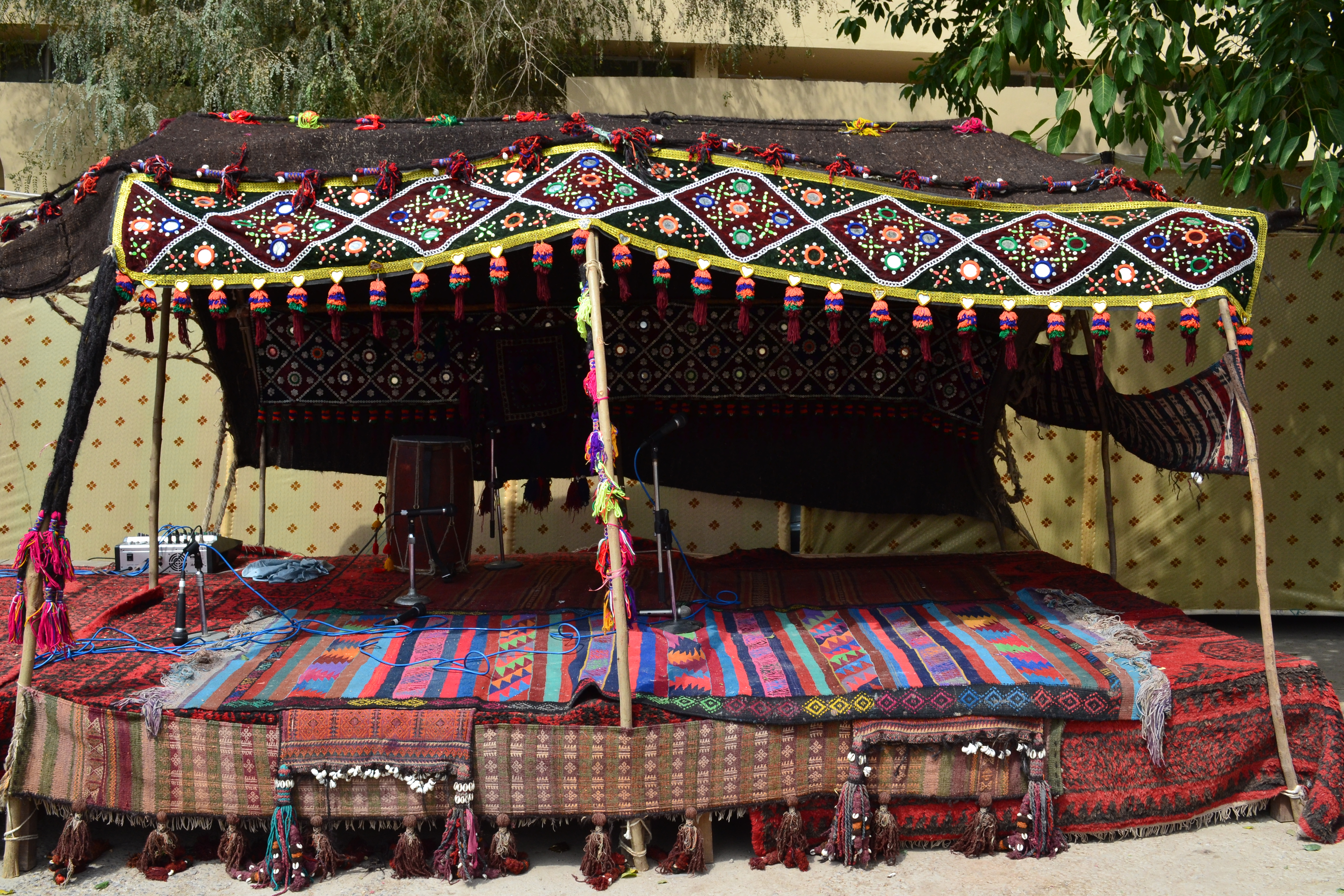
Mirror embroidery and coin embroidery of the nomadic Baloch

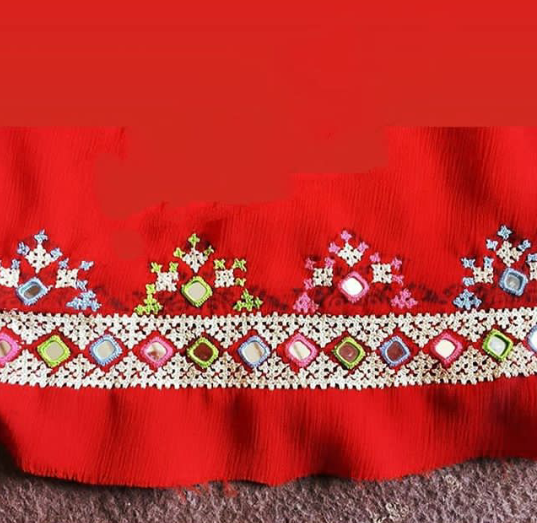
An example of Balochi mirror embroidery

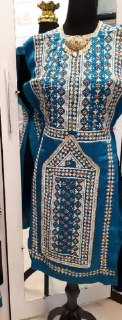
An example of Balochi needlework dress

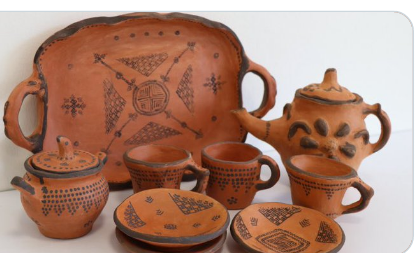
An example of Balochi pottery

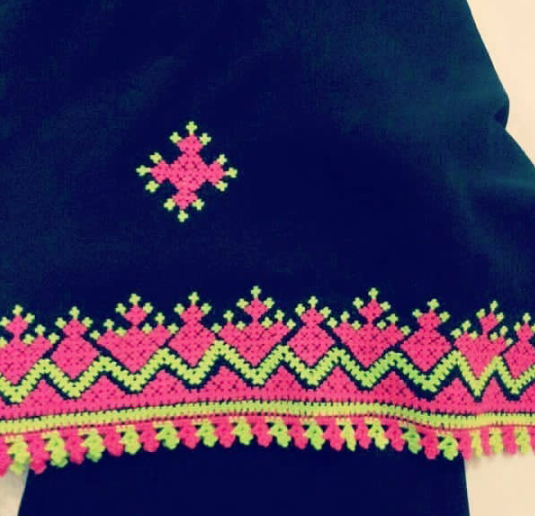
An example of Balochi needlework on the shawl

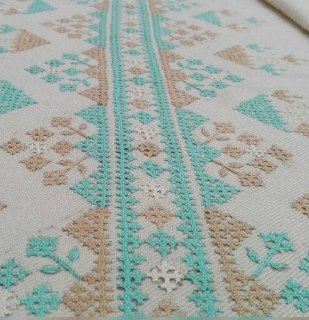
An example of Balochi embroidery palivar

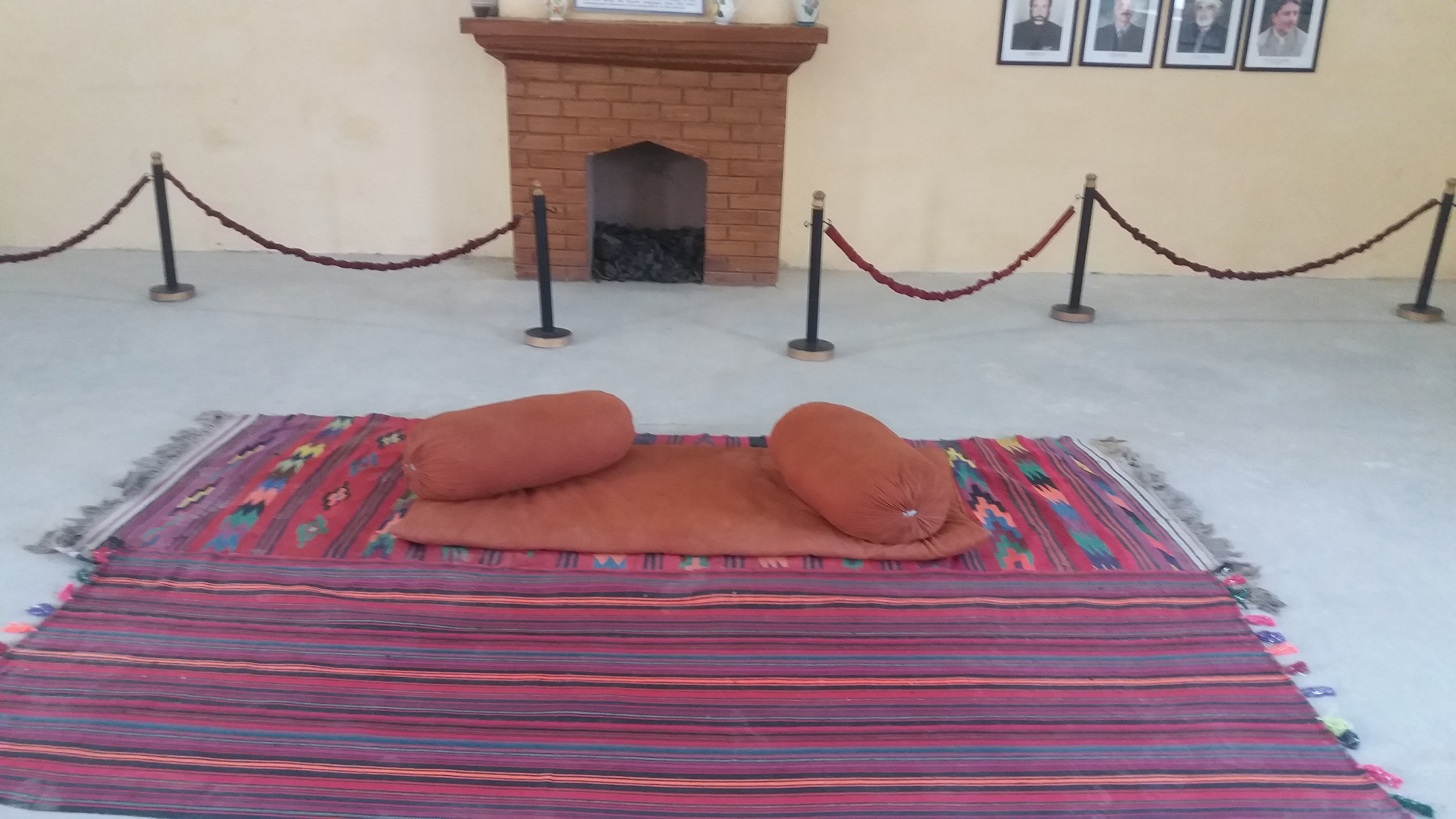
Traditional Balochi seating arrangements

== See also ==
- Iranian handicrafts
