= Natiq Makrani =

Mirza Gul Muhammad Khan Makrani
- میرزا گل محمد خان مکرانی ناطق مکرانی
- Born: 1813; Panjgur, Balochistan
- Died: 1848 (aged 34–35); Lucknow, India

Mirza Gul Muhammad Khan Makrani (Balochi: میرزا گل محمد خان مکرانی; 1813–1848), better known as Natiq Makrani (Balochi: ناطق مکرانی) was a Baloch writer, mystic, poet and theologian of the 13th lunar century and Balochi literature.

== Biography ==
He was born in at Panjgur, Balochistan and moved to Isfahan, Iran. He left for Sindh in the court of Talpur dynasty in his middle of life.

== Career ==
His poetry was collected by his Students in a book, Johar-e-Muazzam and published in Nawal Kishore Press in the city of Lucknow.

Mirza Natiq Makrani has used most forms of Persian poetry such as Sonnet, qasida, Mathnawi, Rubaʿi and Qit'a. But due to the abundance of his sonnets, it can be concluded that he was more interested in experimenting in this format.
