= Umrani =

Eastern Baloch tribe of Balochistan

The Umrani are an eastern Baloch tribe of Balochistan, Pakistan.
