= Mansel Longworth Dames =

British orientalist (1850–1922)

Mansel Longworth Dames (1850–1922) was a scholar of oriental and Portuguese languages.

Longworth Dames was born in Bath in 1850, the eldest son of George Longworth Dames and Caroline Amelia Brunswick. Longworth Dames passed the Indian Civil Service examination in 1868, and on his arrival in India in 1870 was posted to the Punjab. He served continuously till his retirement in 1897, apart from in 1879 when he was on special duty with the troops during the Second Anglo-Afghan War.

Much of his service was passed in the trans-Indus district of Dera Ghazi Khan, where he had opportunities for studying the Baluch people (Baloch) and became an authority on the various dialects of the Baluch and Pushtu languages.

In 1891 he published a Baluchi grammar and textbook, which was used for many years by students. He contributed in 1904 to the monograph series of the Royal Asiatic Society an account of the Baluch, and in the following year the Royal Asiatic and the Folk-Lore Societies jointly published in two volumes his Popular Poetry of the Baluchis. In 1903 he contributed to the Folk-Lore Journal an article on "Folk-Lore of the Azores." He was an ardent student of Buddhist art on the north-west frontier of India, and brought with him from there a fine collection of sculpture of the Gandhara period. He also did valuable service in rearranging the Buddhist rooms of the British Museum. For more than twenty years he served the Royal Asiatic Society, for part of the time as a vice-president and Joint-Treasurer, and in 1921 he acted as honorary secretary.

After his retirement he prepared several important articles for the Encyclopaedia of Islam on subjects relating to that part of northern India which he had studied so closely. Besides Oriental languages he was an excellent Portuguese scholar, and his wide knowledge of Portuguese literature, and of the philology and geography of India, was illustrated in his translation and annotations of The Book of Duarte Barbosa, edited for the Hakluyt Society in 1918–21. He compiled a memoir on the Portuguese and German colonies in Africa for the use of the 1919 Peace Congress at Versailles. He was also a member of the Royal Numismatic Society and possessed a fine collection of oriental coins.

Longworth Dames became a member of the Folk-Lore Society in 1892 and served for many years on the council.

In 1877 he married Mary Jane Ivens. They had one daughter. Longworth Dames died in Guildford on 8 January 1922.

== Selected publications ==
- Longworth Dames, Mansel (1922) [1891]. A Text Book of the Balochi language : consisting of miscellaneous stories, legends, poems and Balochi-English vocabulary. Lahore: Printed at the Punjab Government Press.
  - M.L. Dames, ed. (1913). Text-book of the Baluchi language. Translated by R.S. Diwan Jamiat Rai; Munshi Dur Muhammad. Lahore: Printed at the Punjab Govt., Press.
- Longworth Dames, Mansel (1904). The Baloch Race: A Historical and Ethnological Sketch. Asiatic Society Monographs. Vol. IV. London: Royal Asiatic Society.
- Longworth Dames, Mansel (1907). Popular Poetry of the Baloches (Volume 1). Asiatic Society Monographs. Vol. IX. London: Royal Asiatic Society.
- Longworth Dames, Mansel (1908). "The mint of Kuraman, with special reference to the coins of the Qarlughs and Khwarizm-Shahs". Journal of the Royal Asiatic Society of Great Britain and Ireland. 40 (2): 389–408. doi:10.1017/S0035869X00080539. JSTOR 25210587.
- Longworth Dames, Mansel (1918–1921). The Book of Duarte Barbosa : an account of the countries bordering on the Indian Ocean and their inhabitants (2 Volumes). London: Hakluyt Society. OCLC 3640216.
- Longworth Dames, Mansel (1921). "The Portuguese and Turks in the Indian Ocean in the sixteenth century". Journal of the Royal Asiatic Society of Great Britain and Ireland. 53 (1): 1–28. doi:10.1017/S0035869X00062870. JSTOR 25209694.
