= Muneer Ahmed Badini =

Pakistani writer

Munir Ahmed Badini
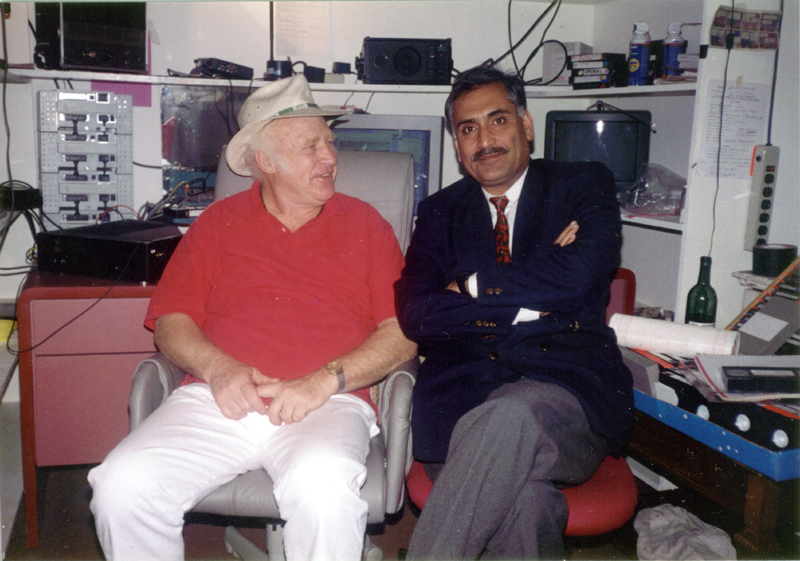
- Born: 1953 (age 72–73); Noshki, Balochistan, Pakistan
- Occupations: Novelist, Writer, Teacher

Munir Ahmed Badini (Balochi:منير احمد بادینی ) born in 1953) is a Pakistani novelist and writer. The recipient of the Pride of Performance, he primarily writes in Balochi and English languages.

== Biography ==
He lives in Quetta and is serving as Secretary for Sports, Environment and Youth Affairs for the government of Balochistan.

== Education ==
Badini studied in his village schools and upon completion of the local Boys' High School, completed his degree in Arts at the Degree College in Quetta. During this time, early 1970s, he was a member of Baloch Students Organization (BSO), and became vice-president of BSO for a year. He was influenced by Marxist literature and during his college years, he translated Joseph Stalin's book Marxism And The National And Colonial Question into the Balochi language. Although this translation has never been officially published, it has been widely read among Badini's fellows.

Later, Badini rejected Stalinist thinking, but maintained a belief in Karl Marx's theory as a comprehensive study of universal human development. However he is not an atheist, as most Marxists are; he believes in religion and is impressed by Sufism.

He completed his Master studies from Punjab University, Lahore, in Philosophy.

== Early career ==
After completion of his master's degree, Badini taught for some time at Degree College, Quetta, as a Lecturer of Philosophy, in 1980. Then he joined Civil Service of Pakistan, where he has served in various posts including:

- Secretary of Fisheries Provincial Government of Balochistan 1994–1996 and from 1998–1999
- Principal Secretary to Chief Minister of Balochistan 1997
- Commissioner of Kalat Division 1997–1998
- Secretary of Education Provincial Government of Balochistan 2002–2007 and 2011 to present.

== Writing career ==
During all this period Badini never ceased to write . He writes fiction. His works are influenced by Existentialism, including writers such as Jean-Paul Sartre, Albert Camus, and Søren Kierkegaard, along with writers Milan Kundera and Najib Mahfuz. The theme of his writings is Baloch society . He writes in Rakhshani-Balochi dialect, and he can read and write all dialects of Balochi and Brahui languages he is also fluent in English and Urdu.

== Environment Protection Work ==
Munir Badini visited Ziarat district to ensure the efforts for the preservation of the 3000-year-old world heritage of Juniper forest and wildlife in Ziarat as environment protection efforts, he planted tree with canoe kayak youth players Hanna Lake Quetta as protection of environment project of Hayat Durrani Water Sports Academy (HDWSA) to involve youths in the importance of protection of environment in Quetta.

== Selected bibliography ==
- Rekani Talah Halke ["A Village in the Dunes"] Published by Balochi Academy Quetta, Balochistan. 1993
- Bel Ke Mah Bekapeet ["Let The Moon Vanish"] Published by Balochi Academy Quetta, Balochistan. 1994
- Agah-en Chamani Wahb ["The Dream of Open Eyes"] Published by Balochi Academy Quetta, Balochistan. 1996. (This is a fictional travelogue of his experience after a visit to United States of America.)
- Shal-e Gullen Bazaar ["The Flowery Bazaar of Shal"] Published by New College Publications Quetta, 2008. (This a trilogy about the social life of Shal (which is the traditional name of Quetta city) and the period is 1970–2000). And has become very popular among Baloch youths especially of Makuran and coastal regions of Balochistan.
- Tahariani Posag ["The Children of Darkness"] New College Publications, 2009. ISBN 978-969-8735-29-6
- Eh Zind Tara Brazit ["He Is Worth It"] New College Publications, 2009. ISBN 978-969-8735-35-7
- Karnani Kahren Dohk ["The Sorrows of Centuries"] Published by Baloch Academy Quetta, Balochistan, 2009.
- Mani Dairee-e Latain Pan ["A Few Pages of My Diary"] New College Publication 2009.
- Hazaren Pasaani Shap ["A Night of Thousand Twists"] A collection short stories. New College Publications 2010. Link to the short story Hazaren Pasaani Shap but this is only one story from the book, link from Baask a Balochi literary website
- Espaten Haspa Sanj Bekan ["Sadle The White Horse"] New College Publications 2010.
- Esh Tai Zameen Tai Azmaan ["This is Your Land, This is Your Sky"] New College Publications 2010.
- Esh Gon Saraan Labe ["Playing with the Lives"] New College Publications 2010.
- Hazaren Karnani Wadaar ["Waiting of a Thousand Years"] New College Publications 2010.
- Bekan k Tao Bebu ["Be and do it"] It's online, everyone can read it.
- Jemari ay Rokapt ["The sunset of Jemari"]During the Second World War at the allied base established in the then Jemari, the wife of an anonymous British general used to write her diary which she titled "the Sunset of Jemari".
- Bahisht o Dozah ["Heaven and Hell"] New College Publications 2014.
