= Mir Gwahram Khan Lashari =

Baloch Chief

Mir Gwahram Khan Lashari, Mir Govahram Khan Lashari, or Mir Gohram Khan Lashari, was a Baloch chieftain in the 15th century. He was considered a hero of the Lashari Baloch's.

Gwahram was the son of Nodhbandagh "the gold-scatterer".

== Thirty Years War ==
Mir Gwahram and Mir Chakar Rind, head of the Rind Baloch tribe, went to war that resulted in thousands dead, including Mir Chakar's brother. The war and the gallantry of the two tribal leaders continues to be a part of the Baloch peoples' history.

Mir Gwaharam Lashari, the head of the Lashari tribe, was killed during the "Thirty Years' War" between the Lashari and Rind tribes. This conflict resulted in thousands of deaths, including Mir Chakar's brother. Ultimately, the Rind tribe defeated the Lashari tribe.
