= Rind (tribe) =

Baloch tribe

The Rind (Balochi: رِند) is a large Baloch tribe traditionally regarded as one of the five original lineages of the Baloch people. The tribe is traditionally associated with Mir Chakar Rind, a prominent 15th-century Baloch ruler and folk hero who unified many Baloch tribes. According to Baloch folklore, the clan traces its ancestry to Rind Khan, one of Mir Jalal Khan's four sons.

== Clans ==
Clans of the Rind tribe include Miranzai, Tahirzai, Shahalzai, Perozai, Mirozai, Khiazai, Shahozai, Mullazai, Bugani, Kahmaki, Askani, Dagarani, Kolagi, Kal kali, Nuhani, Sheh‑o‑Mir, Jalbani , Qaisran,Jadhozai (جاڈوزئی) and Rind Sial.

== History ==
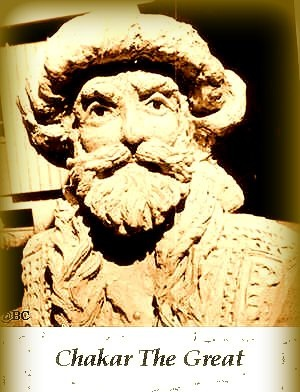
Mir Chakar Khan Rind

At the turn of the 15th century the Rind led by Mir Chakar Rind are believed to have engaged in a 30-year war against the Lashari, in which both tribes suffered greatly. These events are the subject of many Balochi heroic ballads.
