= Hamiri, Sistan and Baluchestan =

Village in Sistan and Baluchestan province, Iran

Hamiri Persian: حميري
- Village
- Location within Iran
- Coordinates: 26°10′05″N 60°34′04″E
- Country: Iran
- Province: Sistan and Baluchestan
- County: Qasr-e Qand
- District: Sarbuk
- Rural District: Hamiri

Population (2016)
  - Total: 2,236
- Time zone: UTC+3:30 (IRST)

Hamiri (Persian: حميري) (Note: Also romanized as Ḩamīrī, Hamīrī, Ḩomēyrī, Ḩomeyrī, and Homirī; also known as Homeyrī Tūjān) is a village in, and the capital of, Hamiri Rural District of Sarbuk District, Qasr-e Qand County, Sistan and Baluchestan province, Iran.

== Demographics ==
=== Population ===
At the time of the 2006 National Census, the village's population was 2,132 in 430 households, when it was in Sarbuk Rural District of the former Qasr-e Qand District of Nik Shahr County. The following census in 2011 counted 2,221 people in 503 households. The 2016 census measured the population of the village as 2,236 people in 580 households, by which time the district had been separated from the county in the establishment of Qasr-e Qand County. The rural district was transferred to the new Sarbuk District, and Hamiri was transferred to Hamiri Rural District created in the district. It was the most populous village in its rural district.
