= Hit, Qasr-e Qand =

Village in Sistan and Baluchestan province, Iran

Hit Persian: هیت
- Village
- Location within Iran
- Coordinates: 26°11′43″N 60°40′49″E
- Country: Iran
- Province: Sistan and Baluchestan
- County: Qasr-e Qand
- District: Central
- Rural District: Hit

Population (2016)
  - Total: 2,395
- Time zone: UTC+3:30 (IRST)

Hit (Persian: هيت) (Note: Also romanized as Hait, Heyt, Heyyat, and Hīt) is a village in, and the capital of, Hit Rural District of the Central District of Qasr-e Qand County, Sistan and Baluchestan province, Iran.

== Demographics ==
=== Population ===
At the time of the 2006 National Census, the village's population was 2,751 in 570 households, when it was in Sarbuk Rural District of the former Qasr-e Qand District of Nik Shahr County. The following census in 2011 counted 2,990 people in 634 households. The 2016 census measured the population of the village as 2,395 people in 710 households, by which time the district had been separated from the county in the establishment of Qasr-e Qand County. The rural district was transferred to the new Central District, and Hit was transferred to Hit Rural District created in the district. It was the most populous village in its rural district.
