= Ragsha =

Ragsha رگشا
- Village
- Location within Iran
- Coordinates: 26°08′33″N 60°42′44″E
- Country: Iran
- Province: Sistan and Baluchestan
- County: Qasr-e Qand
- Bakhsh: Sarbuk
- Rural District: Sarbuk

Population (2006)
  - Total: 177
- Time zone: UTC+3:30 (IRST)

Ragsha (Persian: رگشا, also romanized as Ragshā; also known as Rakshā, Rekshā, Rokshā, and Rūkshah) is a village in Sarbuk Rural District, Sarbuk District, Qasr-e Qand County, Sistan and Baluchestan Province, Iran. At the 2006 census, its population was 177, in 36 families.
