= Tutoran Dap =

Tutoran Dap توتراندپ
- Village
- Location within Iran
- Coordinates: 26°22′01″N 60°41′52″E
- Country: Iran
- Province: Sistan and Baluchestan
- County: Qasr-e Qand
- Bakhsh: Central
- Rural District: Holunchekan

Population (2006)
  - Total: 54
- Time zone: UTC+3:30 (IRST)
  - Summer (DST): UTC+4:30 (IRDT)

Tutoran Dap (Persian: توتراندپ, also Romanized as Tūtorān Dap; also known as Tūtorān, Tūtrūn, and Tūţūrān) is a village in Holunchekan Rural District in the Central District of Qasr-e Qand County, Sistan and Baluchestan Province, Iran. At the 2006 census, its population was 54, in 8 families.
