= Bag, Qasr-e Qand =

bug بگ
- Village
- Location within Iran
- Coordinates: 26°11′05″N 60°37′40″E
- Country: Iran
- Province: Sistan and Baluchestan
- County: Qasr-e Qand
- Bakhsh: Sarbuk
- Rural District: Sarbuk

Population (2006)
  - Total: 951
- Time zone: UTC+3:30 (IRST)
  - Summer (DST): UTC+4:30 (IRDT)

bug (Persian: بگ; also known as Būg and Qal‘eh-ye Būgh) is a village in Sarbuk Rural District, Sarbuk District, Qasr-e Qand County, Sistan and Baluchestan Province, Iran. At the 2006 census, its population was 951, in 194 families.
