= Si Tall =

Si Tall سي تل
- Village
- Interactive map of Si Tall
- Country: Iran
- Province: Sistan and Baluchestan
- County: Qasr-e Qand
- Bakhsh: Sarbuk
- Rural District: Sarbuk

Population (2006)
  - Total: 84
- Time zone: UTC+3:30 (IRST)
  - Summer (DST): UTC+4:30 (IRDT)

Si Tall (Persian: سي تل, also Romanized as Sī Tall) is a village in Sarbuk Rural District, Sarbuk District, Qasr-e Qand County, Sistan and Baluchestan Province, Iran. At the 2006 census, its population was 84, in 18 families.
