= Tahati =

Tahati تحتي
- Village
- Country: Iran
- Province: Sistan and Baluchestan
- County: Qasr-e Qand
- Bakhsh: Sarbuk
- Rural District: Sarbuk

Population (2006)
  - Total: 39
- Time zone: UTC+3:30 (IRST)
  - Summer (DST): UTC+4:30 (IRDT)

Tahati (Persian: تحتي, also Romanized as Taḩatī) is a village in Sarbuk Rural District, Sarbuk District, Qasr-e Qand County, Sistan and Baluchestan Province, Iran. At the 2006 census, its population was 39, in 9 families.
