= Holunchekan =

Village in Sistan and Baluchestan province, Iran

Holunchekan Persian: هلونچگان
- Village
- Location within Iran
- Coordinates: 26°15′22″N 60°45′32″E
- Country: Iran
- Province: Sistan and Baluchestan
- County: Qasr-e Qand
- District: Central
- Rural District: Holunchekan

Population (2016)
  - Total: 1,294
- Time zone: UTC+3:30 (IRST)

Holunchekan (Persian: هلونچكان) (Note: Also romanized as Holūnchekān; also known as ’Alūb Chekān, Helān Chekān, Holān Chokān, and Holonchekān) is a village in, and the capital of, Holunchekan Rural District of the Central District of Qasr-e Qand County, Sistan and Baluchestan province, Iran.

== Demographics ==
=== Population ===
At the time of the 2006 National Census, the village's population was 1,017 in 178 households, when it was in the former Qasr-e Qand District of Nik Shahr County. The following census in 2011 counted 1,177 people in 260 households. The 2016 census measured the population of the village as 1,294 people in 300 households, by which time the district had been separated from the county in the establishment of Qasr-e Qand County. The rural district was transferred to the new Central District. It was the most populous village in its rural district.
