= Bufkan =

Bufkan بوفكان
- Village
- Location within Iran
- Coordinates: 26°14′42″N 60°45′01″E
- Country: Iran
- Province: Sistan and Baluchestan
- County: Qasr-e Qand
- Bakhsh: Central
- Rural District: Holunchekan

Population (2006)
  - Total: 52
- Time zone: UTC+3:30 (IRST)
  - Summer (DST): UTC+4:30 (IRDT)

Bufkan (Persian: بوفكان, also Romanized as Būfkān) is a village in Holunchekan Rural District in the Central District of Qasr-e Qand County, Sistan and Baluchestan Province, Iran. At the 2006 census, its population was 52, in 11 families.
