= Jodegalabad =

Jodegalabad جدگال اباد
- village
- Interactive map of Jodegalabad
- Coordinates: 25°48′N 61°06′E
- Country: Iran
- Province: Sistan and Baluchestan
- County: Qasr-e Qand
- Bakhsh: Talang
- Rural District: Talang

Population (2006)
  - Total: 208
- Time zone: UTC+3:30 (IRST)
  - Summer (DST): UTC+4:30 (IRDT)

Jodegalabad (Persian: جدگال اباد, also Romanized as Jodegālābād) is a village in Talang Rural District, Talang District, Qasr-e Qand County, Sistan and Baluchestan Province, Iran. At the 2006 census, its population was 208, in 47 families.
