= Karkum =

Karkum كركوم
- Village
- Location within Iran
- Coordinates: 26°28′25″N 60°43′22″E
- Country: Iran
- Province: Sistan and Baluchestan
- County: Qasr-e Qand
- Bakhsh: Central
- Rural District: Holunchekan

Population (2006)
  - Total: 137
- Time zone: UTC+3:30 (IRST)
  - Summer (DST): UTC+4:30 (IRDT)

Karkum (Persian: كركوم, also Romanized as Karkūm; also known as Dārkūd, Dārkūm, Karkom, Qarah Qom, and Qarqom) is a village in Holunchekan Rural District in the Central District of Qasr-e Qand County, Sistan and Baluchestan Province, Iran. At the 2006 census, its population was 137, in 40 families.
