= Charti =

Charti چرتي
- Village
- Interactive map of Charti
- Country: Iran
- Province: Sistan and Baluchestan
- County: Qasr-e Qand
- Bakhsh: Central
- Rural District: Holunchekan

Population (2006)
  - Total: 45
- Time zone: UTC+3:30 (IRST)
  - Summer (DST): UTC+4:30 (IRDT)

Charti (Persian: چرتي, also Romanized as Chartī) is a village in Holunchekan Rural District in the Central District of Qasr-e Qand County, Sistan and Baluchestan province, Iran.

== Population ==
This village is located in Helonchgan district and according to the census of Iran Statistics Center in 2005, its population was 45 people (9 households).
