= Dep, Iran =

Dep دپ
- Village
- Location within Iran
- Coordinates: 26°06′30″N 60°31′17″E
- Country: Iraq
- Province: Sistan and Baluchestan
- County: Qasr-e Qand
- Bakhsh: Sarbuk
- Rural District: Sarbuk

Population (2006)
  - Total: 377
- Time zone: UTC+3:30 (IRST)
  - Summer (DST): UTC+4:30 (IRDT)

Dep (Persian: دپ, also Romanized as Dap) is a village in Sarbuk Rural District, Sarbuk District, Qasr-e Qand County, Sistan and Baluchestan Province, Iran. At the 2006 census, its population was 377, in 69 families.
