= Allahiabad =

Coordinates: 26°22′N 60°56′E

Allahiabad الهي اباد
- Village
- Interactive map of Allahiabad
- Country: Iran
- Province: Sistan and Baluchestan
- County: Qasr-e Qand
- Bakhsh: Central
- Rural District: Holunchekan

Population (2006)
  - Total: 105
- Time zone: UTC+3:30 (IRST)
  - Summer (DST): UTC+4:30 (IRDT)

Allahiabad (Persian: الهي اباد, also Romanized as Allahīābād) is a village in Holunchekan Rural District in the Central District of Qasr-e Qand County, Sistan and Baluchestan Province, Iran. At the 2006 census, its population was 105, in 19 families.
