= Chorrak, Qasr-e Qand =

Chorrak چرك
- Village
- Location within Iran
- Coordinates: 25°46′53″N 61°00′16″E
- Country: Iran
- Province: Sistan and Baluchestan
- County: Qasr-e Qand
- Bakhsh: Talang
- Rural District: Talang

Population (2006)
  - Total: 320
- Time zone: UTC+3:30 (IRST)
  - Summer (DST): UTC+4:30 (IRDT)

Chorrak (Persian: چرك, also Romanized as Chork; also known as Jowrak) is a village in Talang Rural District, Talang District, Qasr-e Qand County, Sistan and Baluchestan Province, Iran. According to the 2006 census, its population was 320, distributed among 65 families.
