= Divari =

Divari ديواري
- Village
- Location within Iran
- Coordinates: 26°27′49″N 60°46′06″E
- Country: Iran
- Province: Sistan and Baluchestan
- County: Qasr-e Qand
- Bakhsh: Central
- Rural District: Holunchekan

Population (2006)
  - Total: 47
- Time zone: UTC+3:30 (IRST)
  - Summer (DST): UTC+4:30 (IRDT)

Divari (Persian: ديواري, also Romanized as Dīvārī) is a village in Holunchekan Rural District in the Central District of Qasr-e Qand County, Sistan and Baluchestan Province, Iran. At the 2006 census, its population was 47, distributed amongst nine families.
