= Gardak, Qasr-e Qand =

Gardak گرداك
- Village
- Location within Iran
- Coordinates: 26°18′42″N 60°42′49″E
- Country: Iran
- Province: Sistan and Baluchestan
- County: Qasr-e Qand
- Bakhsh: Central
- Rural District: Holunchekan

Population (2006)
  - Total: 597
- Time zone: UTC+3:30 (IRST)
  - Summer (DST): UTC+4:30 (IRDT)

Gardak (Persian: گرداك, also Romanized as Gardāk; also known as Gardāg and Gardāg-e Bālā) is a village in Holunchekan Rural District in the Central District of Qasr-e Qand County, Sistan and Baluchestan Province, Iran. At the 2006 census, its population was 597, in 86 families.
