= Hajji Sabzan =

Hajji Sabzan حاجي سبزان
- Village
- Interactive map of Hajji Sabzan
- Country: Iran
- Province: Sistan and Baluchestan
- County: Qasr-e Qand
- Bakhsh: Central
- Rural District: Holunchekan

Population (2006)
  - Total: 137
- Time zone: UTC+3:30 (IRST)
  - Summer (DST): UTC+4:30 (IRDT)

Hajji Sabzan (Persian: حاجي سبزان, also Romanized as Ḩājjī Sabzān; also known as Ḩājjī Sabz) is a village in Holunchekan Rural District in the Central District of Qasr-e Qand County, Sistan and Baluchestan Province, Iran. At the 2006 census, its population was 137, in 26 families.
