= Kahn-e Bala, Sistan and Baluchestan =

Village in Sistan and Baluchestan province, Iran

Kahn-e Bala Persian: كهن بالا
- Village
- Location within Iran
- Coordinates: 26°00′49″N 60°53′24″E
- Country: Iran
- Province: Sistan and Baluchestan
- County: Qasr-e Qand
- District: Talang
- Rural District: Sharak

Population (2016)
  - Total: 1,148
- Time zone: UTC+3:30 (IRST)

Kahn-e Bala (Persian: كهن بالا) (Note: Also romanized as Kahn-e Bālā; also known as Kahn-e Bālā’ī, Kahn-e Barānī, and Kohan-e ‘Olyā) is a village in Sharak Rural District of Talang District, Qasr-e Qand County, Sistan and Baluchestan province, Iran.

== Demographics ==
=== Population ===
At the time of the 2006 National Census, the village's population was 651 in 146 households, when it was in Talang Rural District of Polan District, Chabahar County. The following census in 2011 counted 784 people in 184 households. The 2016 census measured the population of the village as 1,148 people in 339 households, by which time the rural district had been separated from the county in the establishment of Qasr-e Qand County and transferred to the new Talang District and transferred to the new Talang District. Kahn-e Bala was transferred to Sharak Rural District created in the district. It was the most populous village in its rural district.
