= Mirch, Iran =

Mirch ميرچ
- Village
- Location within Iran
- Coordinates: 26°28′11″N 60°43′32″E
- Country: Iran
- Province: Sistan and Baluchestan
- County: Qasr-e Qand
- Bakhsh: Central
- Rural District: Holunchekan

Population (2006)
  - Total: 613
- Time zone: UTC+3:30 (IRST)
  - Summer (DST): UTC+4:30 (IRDT)

Mirch (Persian: ميرچ, also Romanized as Mīrch) is a village in Holunchekan Rural District in the Central District of Qasr-e Qand County, Sistan and Baluchestan Province, Iran. At the 2006 census, its population was 613, in 142 families.
