= Burniduk =

Burniduk بورنيدوك
- Village
- Location within Iran
- Coordinates: 25°57′21″N 60°57′01″E
- Country: Iran
- Province: Sistan and Baluchestan
- County: Qasr-e Qand
- Bakhsh: Talang
- Rural District: Talang

Population (2006)
  - Total: 65
- Time zone: UTC+3:30 (IRST)
  - Summer (DST): UTC+4:30 (IRDT)

Burniduk (Persian: بورنيدوك, also Romanized as Būrnīdūk; also known as Borīndūk, Brīndūk, Būrīdūk, and Kohan Balūchānī) is a village in Talang Rural District, Talang District, Qasr-e Qand County, Sistan and Baluchestan Province, Iran. At the 2006 census, its population was 65, in 13 families.
