= Padkub =

Padkub پادكوب
- Village
- Location within Iran
- Coordinates: 26°25′36″N 60°45′13″E
- Country: Iran
- Province: Sistan and Baluchestan
- County: Qasr-e Qand
- Bakhsh: Central
- Rural District: Holunchekan

Population (2006)
  - Total: 209
- Time zone: UTC+3:30 (IRST)
  - Summer (DST): UTC+4:30 (IRDT)

Padkub (Persian: پادكوب, also Romanized as Pādkūb; also known as Pātkūb) is a village in Holunchekan Rural District in the Central District of Qasr-e Qand County, Sistan and Baluchestan Province, Iran. At the 2006 census, its population was 209, in 35 families.
