= Shadkam Dap =

Shadkam Dap شادكامدپ
- Village
- Interactive map of Shadkam Dap
- Country: Iran
- Province: Sistan and Baluchestan
- County: Qasr-e Qand
- Bakhsh: Central
- Rural District: Holunchekan

Population (2006)
  - Total: 65
- Time zone: UTC+3:30 (IRST)
  - Summer (DST): UTC+4:30 (IRDT)

Shadkam Dap (Persian: شادكامدپ, also Romanized as Shādkām Dap) is a village in Holunchekan Rural District in the Central District of Qasr-e Qand County, Sistan and Baluchestan Province, Iran. At the 2006 census, its population was 65, in 14 families.
