= Kushat =

Kushat (Persian: كوشات) may refer to:

- Kushat-e Avval
- Kushat-e Dum
- Kushat-e Sum
