= Chutabad =

Chutabad چوت اباد
- Village
- Location within Iran
- Coordinates: 26°13′43″N 60°43′15″E
- Country: Iran
- Province: Sistan and Baluchestan
- County: Qasr-e Qand
- Bakhsh: Central
- Rural District: Holunchekan

Population (2006)
  - Total: 511
- Time zone: UTC+3:30 (IRST)
  - Summer (DST): UTC+4:30 (IRDT)

Chutabad (Persian: چوت اباد, also Romanized as Chūtābād) is a village in Holunchekan Rural District in the Central District of Qasr-e Qand County, Sistan and Baluchestan Province, Iran. At the 2006 census, its population was 511, in 82 families.
