= Dansar =

Dansar (Persian: دن سر) may refer to:

- Dansar, Qasr-e Qand
- Dansar, Sarbuk, Qasr-e Qand County
- Dansar Kaldan, Qasr-e Qand County
