= Azad Gaz =

Azad Gaz ازادگز
- Village
- Location within Iran
- Coordinates: 26°22′40″N 60°44′06″E
- Country: Iran
- Province: Sistan and Baluchestan
- County: Qasr-e Qand
- Bakhsh: Central
- Rural District: Holunchekan

Population (2006)
  - Total: 86
- Time zone: UTC+3:30 (IRST)
  - Summer (DST): UTC+4:30 (IRDT)

Azad Gaz (Persian: ازادگز, also Romanized as Āzād Gaz; also known as Aza Gaz and Ez̧āgaz) is a village in Holunchekan Rural District in the Central District of Qasr-e Qand County, Sistan and Baluchestan Province, Iran. As of the 2006 census, its population was 86, with 16 families.
