= Kutiru =

Kutiru كوتيرو
- Village
- Location within Iran
- Coordinates: 25°48′09″N 60°59′20″E
- Country: Iran
- Province: Sistan and Baluchestan
- County: Qasr-e Qand
- Bakhsh: Talang
- Rural District: Talang

Population (2006)
  - Total: 336
- Time zone: UTC+3:30 (IRST)
  - Summer (DST): UTC+4:30 (IRDT)

Kutiru (Persian: كوتيرو, also Romanized as Kūtīrū; also known as Gūtīrū, Katīrdān, Kītrdān, Kotīredān, and Kūtīrd) is a village in Talang Rural District, Talang District, Qasr-e Qand County, Sistan and Baluchestan Province, Iran. At the 2006 census, its population was 336, in 60 families.
