= Chandukan =

Chandukan چندوكان
- Village
- Location within Iran
- Coordinates: 26°09′57″N 60°32′58″E
- Country: Iran
- Province: Sistan and Baluchestan
- County: Qasr-e Qand
- Bakhsh: Sarbuk
- Rural District: Sarbuk

Population (2006)
  - Total: 1,338
- Time zone: UTC+3:30 (IRST)
  - Summer (DST): UTC+4:30 (IRDT)

Chandukan (Persian: چندوكان, also Romanized as Chandukān and Chandvakān; also known as Chandūk) is a village in Sarbuk Rural District, Sarbuk District, Qasr-e Qand County, Sistan and Baluchestan Province, Iran. At the 2006 census, its population was 1,338, in 212 families.
