= Gurchari =

Gurchari گورچاری
- Village
- Location within Iran
- Coordinates: 25°49′00″N 61°02′00″E
- Country: Iran
- Province: Sistan and Baluchestan
- County: Qasr-e Qand
- Bakhsh: Talang
- Rural District: Talang

Population (2006)
  - Total: 211
- Time zone: UTC+3:30 (IRST)
  - Summer (DST): UTC+4:30 (IRDT)

Gurchari (Persian: گورچاری, also Romanized as Gūrchārī) is a village in Talang Rural District, Talang District, Qasr-e Qand County, Sistan and Baluchestan Province, Iran. At the 2006 census, its population was 211, in 36 families.

Cities, towns and places near Gūrchārī include Vashīn Chāt, Machī Ḩasan, Vashin Chah and Seni.

The closest major cities include Sharjah, Dubai, Karachi and Kermān.
