= Tujan, Iran =

Tujan (Persian: توجن or توجان or طوجان) in Iran may refer to:

- Tujan, Alborz (توجان - Tūjān)
- Tujan, Hormozgan (توجن - Tūjan)
- Tujan, Kerman (طوجان - Ţūjān)
- Tujan, Qasr-e Qand (توجان - Tūjān), Sistan and Baluchestan Province
