= Dezbon =

Village in Sistan and Baluchestan, Iran

Dezbon دزبن
- Village
- Location within Iran
- Coordinates: 26°11′14″N 60°34′46″E
- Country: Iran
- Province: Sistan and Baluchestan
- County: Qasr-e Qand
- Bakhsh: Sarbuk
- Rural District: Sarbuk

Population (2006)
  - Total: 713
- Time zone: UTC+3:30 (IRST)
  - Summer (DST): UTC+4:30 (IRDT)

Dezbon (Persian: دزبن; also known as Dīzbon and Dīzīn) is a village in Sarbuk Rural District, Sarbuk District, Qasr-e Qand County, Sistan and Baluchestan Province, Iran. At the 2006 census, its population was 713, in 133 families.
