= Bundi, Iran =

Bundi بوندي
- Village
- Location within Iran
- Coordinates: 25°50′43″N 61°03′35″E
- Country: Iran
- Province: Sistan and Baluchestan
- County: Qasr-e Qand
- Bakhsh: Talang
- Rural District: Talang

Population (2006)
  - Total: 182
- Time zone: UTC+3:30 (IRST)
  - Summer (DST): UTC+4:30 (IRDT)

Bundi (Persian: بوندي, also Romanized as Būndī; also known as Bondī) is a village in Talang Rural District, Talang District, Qasr-e Qand County, Sistan and Baluchestan Province, Iran. At the 2006 census, its population was 182, in 36 families.
