= Kaldan, Iran =

Kaldan كالدان
- Village
- Location within Iran
- Coordinates: 25°48′11″N 61°09′13″E
- Country: Iran
- Province: Sistan and Baluchestan
- County: Qasr-e Qand
- Bakhsh: Talang
- Rural District: Talang

Population (2006)
  - Total: 162
- Time zone: UTC+3:30 (IRST)
  - Summer (DST): UTC+4:30 (IRDT)

Kaldan (Persian: كالدان, also Romanized as Kāldān and Kaldān) is a village in Talang Rural District, Talang District, Qasr-e Qand County, Sistan and Baluchestan Province, Iran. At the 2006 census, its population was 162, in 35 families.
