= Vashin Chat =

Vashin Chat وشين چات
- Village
- Location within Iran
- Coordinates: 25°49′19″N 61°02′03″E
- Country: Iran
- Province: Sistan and Baluchestan
- County: Qasr-e Qand
- Bakhsh: Talang
- Rural District: Talang

Population (2006)
  - Total: 352
- Time zone: UTC+3:30 (IRST)
  - Summer (DST): UTC+4:30 (IRDT)

Vashin Chat (Persian: وشين چات, also Romanized as Vashīn Chāt and Vashīn Chat; also known as Vashīn Chāh) is a village in Talang Rural District, Talang District, Qasr-e Qand County, Sistan and Baluchestan Province, Iran. At the 2006 census, its population was 352, in 71 families.
