= Darvasak =

Darvasak درواسك
- Village
- Location within Iran
- Coordinates: 26°23′04″N 60°45′53″E
- Country: Iran
- Province: Sistan and Baluchestan
- County: Qasr-e Qand
- Bakhsh: Central
- Rural District: Holunchekan

Population (2006)
  - Total: 274
- Time zone: UTC+3:30 (IRST)
  - Summer (DST): UTC+4:30 (IRDT)

Darvasak (Persian: درواسك, also Romanized as Darvāsak) is a village in Holunchekan Rural District in the Central District of Qasr-e Qand County, Sistan and Baluchestan Province, Iran. At the 2006 census, its population was 274, in 51 families.
