= Hezari, Qasr-e Qand =

Hezari هزاري
- Village
- Location within Iran
- Coordinates: 26°09′05″N 60°33′18″E
- Country: Iran
- Province: Sistan and Baluchestan
- County: Qasr-e Qand
- Bakhsh: Sarbuk
- Rural District: Sarbuk

Population (2006)
  - Total: 671
- Time zone: UTC+3:30 (IRST)
  - Summer (DST): UTC+4:30 (IRDT)

Hezari (Persian: هزاري, also Romanized as Hezārī and Hazārī; also known as Azāhī, Ezārehī, Hazāreh, and Hezāreh’ī) is a village in Sarbuk Rural District, Sarbuk District, Qasr-e Qand County, Sistan and Baluchestan Province, Iran. As per the 2006 census, its population consisted of 118 families.
