= Bistak =

Bistak بيستك
- Village
- Location within Iran
- Coordinates: 25°52′08″N 60°36′22″E
- Country: Iran
- Province: Sistan and Baluchestan
- County: Qasr-e Qand
- Bakhsh: Sarbuk
- Rural District: Sarbuk

Population (2006)
  - Total: 111
- Time zone: UTC+3:30 (IRST)
  - Summer (DST): UTC+4:30 (IRDT)

Bistak (Persian: بيستك, also Romanized as Bīstak; also known as Bī Āstūk) is a village in Sarbuk Rural District, Sarbuk District, Qasr-e Qand County, Sistan and Baluchestan Province, Iran. At the 2006 census, its population was 111, in 23 families.
