= Anjiraki =

Anjiraki انجيركي
- village
- Interactive map of Anjiraki
- Coordinates: 26°23′N 60°47′E
- Country: Iran
- Province: Sistan and Baluchestan
- County: Qasr-e Qand
- Bakhsh: Central
- Rural District: Holunchekan

Population (2006)
  - Total: 81
- Time zone: UTC+3:30 (IRST)
  - Summer (DST): UTC+4:30 (IRDT)

Anjiraki (Persian: انجيركي, also Romanized as Ānjīrakī) is a village in Holunchekan Rural District in the Central District of Qasr-e Qand County, Sistan and Baluchestan Province, Iran. At the 2006 census, its population was 81, in 14 families.
