= Dahirak =

Dahirak دهيرك
- Village
- Location within Iran
- Coordinates: 26°28′47″N 60°44′07″E
- Country: Iran
- Province: Sistan and Baluchestan
- County: Qasr-e Qand
- Bakhsh: Central
- Rural District: Holunchekan

Population (2006)
  - Total: 373
- Time zone: UTC+3:30 (IRST)
  - Summer (DST): UTC+4:30 (IRDT)

Dahirak (Persian: دهيرك, also Romanized as Dahīrak and Dehīrak; also known as Dahrak, Dīrak, and Dīrak Dap) is a village in Holunchekan Rural District in the Central District of Qasr-e Qand County, Sistan and Baluchestan Province, Iran. At the 2006 census, its population was 373, in 87 families.
