= Bani-ye Shib =

Bani-ye Shib باني شيب
- Village
- Location within Iran
- Coordinates: 26°12′00″N 60°40′00″E
- Country: Iran
- Province: Sistan and Baluchestan
- County: Qasr-e Qand
- Bakhsh: Sarbuk
- Rural District: Sarbuk

Population (2006)
  - Total: 641
- Time zone: UTC+3:30 (IRST)
  - Summer (DST): UTC+4:30 (IRDT)

Bani-ye Shib (Persian: باني شيب, also Romanized as Bānī-ye Shīb; also known as Bān-e Shīb) is a village in Sarbuk Rural District, Sarbuk District, Qasr-e Qand County, Sistan and Baluchestan Province, Iran. As per the 2006 census, it had a recorded population of 641 residents from 114 families.
