= Bol, Iran =

Bol or Bal or Bel (Persian: بل) in Iran may refer to:

- Bol, Mazandaran, Iran
- Bol, Chabahar, Chabahar County, Sistan and Baluchestan Province, Iran
- Bal, Qasr-e Qand, Qasr-e Qand County, Sistan and Baluchestan Province, Iran
- Bal-e Bala, Qasr-e Qand County, Sistan and Baluchestan Province, Iran
- Bal-e Pain, Qasr-e Qand County, Sistan and Baluchestan Province, Iran
- Bal, Zanjan, Iran
