= Qand =

Qand قند
- Village
- Location within Iran
- Coordinates: 26°14′13″N 60°44′27″E
- Country: Iran
- Province: Sistan and Baluchestan
- County: Qasr-e Qand
- Bakhsh: Sarbuk
- Rural District: Sarbuk

Population (2006)
  - Total: 98
- Time zone: UTC+3:30 (IRST)
  - Summer (DST): UTC+4:30 (IRDT)

Qand (Persian: قند; also known as Qāsagān, Qāsegān, and Qaşr-e Qand) is a village in Sarbuk Rural District, Sarbuk District, Qasr-e Qand County, Sistan and Baluchestan Province, Iran. In the 2006 census, its population was 98, in 19 families.
