= Kahurani Gevash =

Kahurani Gevash كهوراني گواش
- Village
- Location within Iran
- Coordinates: 26°16′26″N 60°46′36″E
- Country: Iran
- Province: Sistan and Baluchestan
- County: Qasr-e Qand
- Bakhsh: Central
- Rural District: Holunchekan

Population (2006)
  - Total: 186
- Time zone: UTC+3:30 (IRST)
  - Summer (DST): UTC+4:30 (IRDT)

Kahurani Gevash (Persian: كهوراني گواش, also Romanized as Kahūrānī Gevāsh; also known as Kahūr Āngavāsh, Kahūrān Gevāsh, Tahūrāne Govāsh, and Tahūrān Gevāsh) is a village in Holunchekan Rural District in the Central District of Qasr-e Qand County, Sistan and Baluchestan Province, Iran. At the 2006 census, its population was 186, in 38 families.
