= Tavakkol, Qasr-e Qand =

Tokal توكل
- Village
- Location within Iran
- Coordinates: 26°10′59″N 60°36′45″E
- Country: Iran
- Province: Sistan and Baluchestan
- County: Qasr-e Qand
- Bakhsh: Sarbuk
- Rural District: Sarbuk

Population (2006)
  - Total: 1,084
- Time zone: UTC+3:30 (IRST)
  - Summer (DST): UTC+4:30 (IRDT)

Tavakkol (Persian: توكل, also Romanized as Tokal, Tūkal, and Tū Kol; also known as Tojdan, Tū Gol, Tūjān, and Tūjdān) is a village in Sarbuk Rural District, Sarbuk District, Qasr-e Qand County, Sistan and Baluchestan Province, Iran. At the 2006 census, its population was 1,084, in 207 families.
