= Kushat-e Sum =

Kushat-e Sum كوشات سوم
- Village
- Interactive map of Kushat-e Sum
- Country: Iran
- Province: Sistan and Baluchestan
- County: Qasr-e Qand
- Bakhsh: Central
- Rural District: Holunchekan

Population (2006)
  - Total: 395
- Time zone: UTC+3:30 (IRST)
  - Summer (DST): UTC+4:30 (IRDT)

Kushat-e Sum (Persian: كوشات سوم, also Romanized as Kūshāt-e Sūm) is a village in Holunchekan Rural District in the Central District of Qasr-e Qand County, Sistan and Baluchestan Province, Iran. At the 2006 census, its population was 395, in 73 families.
