= Karchan, Qasr-e Qand =

Karchan كارچان
- Village
- Interactive map of Karchan
- Coordinates: 26°11′43″N 60°59′09″E
- Country: Iran
- Province: Sistan and Baluchestan
- County: Qasr-e Qand
- Bakhsh: Central
- Rural District: Holunchekan

Population (2006)
  - Total: 412
- Time zone: UTC+3:30 (IRST)
  - Summer (DST): UTC+4:30 (IRDT)

Karchan (Persian: كارچان, also Romanized as Kārchān) is a village in the Holunchekan Rural District in the Central District of Qasr-e Qand County, Sistan and Baluchestan Province, Iran. According to the 2006 census, its population consisted of 106 families with a total of 412 people.
