= Bal-e Bala =

Bal-e Bala بل بالا
- Village
- Interactive map of Bal-e Bala
- Country: Iran
- Province: Sistan and Baluchestan
- County: Qasr-e Qand
- Bakhsh: Talang
- Rural District: Talang

Population (2006)
  - Total: 150
- Time zone: UTC+3:30 (IRST)
  - Summer (DST): UTC+4:30 (IRDT)

Bal-e Bala (Persian: بل بالا, also Romanized as Bal-e Bālā) is a village in Talang Rural District, Talang District, Qasr-e Qand County, Sistan and Baluchestan Province, Iran. At the 2006 census, its population was 150, in 30 families.
