= Gorban, Qasr-e Qand =

Gorban گربن
- Village
- Location within Iran
- Coordinates: 26°10′43″N 60°35′02″E
- Country: Iran
- Province: Sistan and Baluchestan
- County: Qasr-e Qand
- Bakhsh: Central
- Rural District: Holunchekan

Population (2006)
  - Total: 170
- Time zone: UTC+3:30 (IRST)
  - Summer (DST): UTC+4:30 (IRDT)

Gorban (Persian: گربن; also known as Garvān and Gorvān) is a village in Holunchekan Rural District in the Central District of Qasr-e Qand County, Sistan and Baluchestan Province, Iran. At the 2006 census, its population was 170, in 34 families.
