= Shudik =

Shudik شوديک
- Village
- Location within Iran
- Coordinates: 25°47′20″N 61°06′20″E
- Country: Iran
- Province: Sistan and Baluchestan
- County: Qasr-e Qand
- Bakhsh: Talang
- Rural District: Talang

Population (2006)
  - Total: 274
- Time zone: UTC+3:30 (IRST)
  - Summer (DST): UTC+4:30 (IRDT)

Shudik (Persian: شوديک, also Romanized as Shūdīk; also known as Shūdī) is a village in Talang Rural District, Talang District, Qasr-e Qand County, Sistan and Baluchestan Province, Iran. At the 2006 census, its population was 274, in 60 families.
