= Sartap, Sarbuk =

Sartap سرتاپ
- Village
- Location within Iran
- Coordinates: 25°59′46″N 60°31′54″E
- Country: Iran
- Province: Sistan and Baluchestan
- County: Qasr-e Qand
- Bakhsh: Sarbuk
- Rural District: Sarbuk

Population (2006)
  - Total: 94
- Time zone: UTC+3:30 (IRST)
  - Summer (DST): UTC+4:30 (IRDT)

Sartap (Persian: سرتاپ, also Romanized as Sārtāp; also known as Sartāb) is a village in Sarbuk Rural District, Sarbuk District, Qasr-e Qand County, Sistan and Baluchestan Province, Iran. At the 2006 census, its population was 94, in 16 families.
