= Sar Tap =

Sar Tap (Persian: سرتاپ) may refer to:

- Sar Tap, Iranshahr
- Sartap, Sarbuk, Qasr-e Qand County
