= Hit Rural District =

Rural district in Sistan and Baluchestan province, Iran

Hit Rural District Persian: دهستان هیت
- Rural District
- Location within Iran
- Coordinates: 26°11′04″N 60°57′58″E
- Country: Iran
- Province: Sistan and Baluchestan
- County: Qasr-e Qand
- District: Central
- Capital: Hit

Population (2016)
  - Total: 6,794
- Time zone: UTC+3:30 (IRST)

Hit Rural District (Persian: دهستان هیت) is in the Central District of Qasr-e Qand County, Sistan and Baluchestan province, Iran. Its capital is the village of Hit.

== History ==
After the 2011 National Census, Qasr-e Qand District was separated from Nik Shahr County, and Talang Rural District from Chabahar County, in the establishment of Qasr-e Qand County, and Hit Rural District was created in the new Central District.

== Demographics ==
=== Population ===
At the time of the 2016 census, the rural district's population was 6,794 in 1,790 households. The most populous of its 24 villages was Hit, with 2,395 people.
