= Bal-e Pain =

Bal-e Pain بل پائين
- Village
- Interactive map of Bal-e Pain
- Country: Iran
- Province: Sistan and Baluchestan
- County: Qasr-e Qand
- Bakhsh: Talang
- Rural District: Talang

Population (2006)
  - Total: 96
- Time zone: UTC+3:30 (IRST)
  - Summer (DST): UTC+4:30 (IRDT)

Bal-e Pain (Persian: بل پائين, also Romanized as Bal-e Pā’īn) is a village in Talang Rural District, Talang District, Qasr-e Qand County, Sistan and Baluchestan Province, Iran. At the 2006 census, its population was 96, in 23 families.
