= Talang, Iran =

Village in Sistan and Baluchestan province, Iran

Talang Persian: تلنگ
- Village
- Location within Iran
- Coordinates: 25°48′21″N 61°01′59″E
- Country: Iran
- Province: Sistan and Baluchestan
- County: Qasr-e Qand
- District: Talang
- Rural District: Talang

Population (2016)
  - Total: 547
- Time zone: UTC+3:30 (IRST)

Talang (Persian: تلنگ) (Note: Also romanized as Teleng; also known as Taland and Telenk) is a village in Talang Rural District of Talang District, Qasr-e Qand County, Sistan and Baluchestan province, Iran, serving as capital of the district.

== Demographics ==
=== Population ===
At the time of the 2006 National Census, the village's population was 374 in 70 households, when it was in Polan District of Chabahar County. The census in 2011 counted 437 people in 94 households. The 2016 census measured the population of the village as 547 people in 138 households, by which time the rural district had been separated from the county in the establishment of Qasr-e Qand County and transferred to the new Talang District.
