= Gatti, Qasr-e Qand =

Gatti گتي
- Village
- Location within Iran
- Coordinates: 26°05′38″N 60°42′44″E
- Country: Iran
- Province: Sistan and Baluchestan
- County: Qasr-e Qand
- Bakhsh: Central
- Rural District: Holunchekan

Population (2006)
  - Total: 139
- Time zone: UTC+3:30 (IRST)
  - Summer (DST): UTC+4:30 (IRDT)

Gatti (Persian: گتي, also Romanized as Gattī; also known as Gattīg) is a village in Holunchekan Rural District in the Central District of Qasr-e Qand County, Sistan and Baluchestan Province, Iran. At the 2006 census, its population was 139, in 24 families.
