= Havaran =

Havaran (Persian: هواران or حواران) may refer to:

- Havaran, Hormozgan (هواران - Havārān)
- Havaran, Nik Shahr (حواران - Ḩavārān), Sistan and Baluchestan Province
- Havaran, Qasr-e Qand (حواران - Ḩavārān), Sistan and Baluchestan Province
