= Sharag =

Village in Sistan and Baluchestan province, Iran

Sharag Persian: شارگ
- Village
- Location within Iran
- Coordinates: 26°01′25″N 61°04′10″E
- Country: Iran
- Province: Sistan and Baluchestan
- County: Qasr-e Qand
- District: Talang
- Rural District: Sharak

Population (2016)
  - Total: 942
- Time zone: UTC+3:30 (IRST)

Sharag (Persian: شارگ) (Note: Also romanized as Shārag; also known as Qal‘eh-ye Shārak and Shārak) is a village in, and the capital of, Sharak Rural District of Talang District, Qasr-e Qand County, Sistan and Baluchestan province, Iran.

== Demographics ==
=== Population ===
At the time of the 2006 National Census, the village's population was 1,058 in 218 households, when it was in Talang Rural District of Polan District, Chabahar County. The following census in 2011 counted 701 people in 165 households. The 2016 census measured the population of the village as 942 people in 267 households, by which time the rural district had been separated from the county in the establishment of Qasr-e Qand County and transferred to the new Talang District. Sharag was transferred to Sharak Rural District created in the district.
