= Dirman =

Village in Sistan and Baluchestan province, Iran

Dirman Persian: تلنگ
- Village
- Location within Iran
- Coordinates: 25°47′25″N 61°03′10″E
- Country: Iran
- Province: Sistan and Baluchestan
- County: Qasr-e Qand
- District: Talang
- Rural District: Talang

Population (2016)
  - Total: 826
- Time zone: UTC+3:30 (IRST)

Dirman (Persian: ديرمان) (Note: Also romanized as Dayermān and Dīrmān) is a village in Talang Rural District of Talang District, Qasr-e Qand County, Sistan and Baluchestan province, Iran.

== Demographics ==
=== Population ===
At the time of the 2006 National Census, the village's population was 755 in 190 households, when it was in Polan District of Chabahar County. The following census in 2011 counted 736 people in 160 households. The 2016 census measured the population of the village as 826 people in 231 households, by which time the rural district had been separated from the county in the establishment of Qasr-e Qand County and was transferred to the new Talang District. It was the most populous village in its rural district.
