= Shir Mohammad Bazar, Qasr-e Qand =

Shir Mohammad Bazar شيرمحمدبازار
- Village
- Location within Iran
- Coordinates: 25°47′23″N 61°01′25″E
- Country: Iran
- Province: Sistan and Baluchestan
- County: Qasr-e Qand
- Bakhsh: Talang
- Rural District: Talang

Population (2006)
  - Total: 331
- Time zone: UTC+3:30 (IRST)
  - Summer (DST): UTC+4:30 (IRDT)

Shir Mohammad Bazar (Persian: شيرمحمدبازار, also Romanized as Shīr Moḩammad Bāzār) is a village in Talang Rural District, Talang District, Qasr-e Qand County, Sistan and Baluchestan Province, Iran. At the 2006 census, its population was 331, in 82 families.
