= Shir Mohammad Bazar =

Shir Mohammad Bazar or Shirmohammad Bazar (Persian: شيرمحمدبازار) may refer to:

- Shir Mohammad Bazar, Chabahar
- Shir Mohammad Bazar, Qasr-e Qand
