= Dansar Kaldan =

Dansar Kaldan دنسركالدان
- Village
- Interactive map of Dansar Kaldan
- Coordinates: 25°48′09″N 61°09′10″E
- Country: Iran
- Province: Sistan and Baluchestan
- County: Qasr-e Qand
- Bakhsh: Talang
- Rural District: Talang

Population (2006)
  - Total: 172
- Time zone: UTC+3:30 (IRST)
  - Summer (DST): UTC+4:30 (IRDT)

Dansar Kaldan (Persian: دنسركالدان, also Romanized as Dansar Kāldān) is a village in Talang Rural District, Talang District, Qasr-e Qand County, Sistan and Baluchestan Province, Iran. At the 2006 census, its population was 172, in 31 families.
