= Pasak, Iran =

Pasak پاسك
- Village
- Location within Iran
- Coordinates: 26°12′39″N 60°46′15″E
- Country: Iran
- Province: Sistan and Baluchestan
- County: Qasr-e Qand
- Bakhsh: Central
- Rural District: Holunchekan

Population (2006)
  - Total: 1,084
- Time zone: UTC+3:30 (IRST)
  - Summer (DST): UTC+4:30 (IRDT)

Pasak (Persian: پاسك, also Romanized as Pāsak) is a village in Holunchekan Rural District in the Central District of Qasr-e Qand County, Sistan and Baluchestan Province, Iran. At the 2006 census, its population was 1,084, in 240 families.
