= Vaddu =

Vaddu may refer to:

- Vaddu, India
- Vaddu, Iran
