= Lalu Bazar =

Lalu Bazar or Lalu-ye Bazar (Persian: للو بازار or لالوبازار) may refer to:

- Lalu Bazar, Chabahar (للو بازار - Lalū Bāzār)
- Lalu Bazar, Qasr-e Qand (لالوبازار - Lālū Bāzār)
