= Mandiru =

Mandiru or Mandirow (Persian: مانديرو) may refer to:

- Mandiru, Chabahar
- Mandirow, Qasr-e Qand
