= Sharak =

Sharak (Persian: شرك or شارك) may refer to:

- Sharak, Bushehr (شرك - Sharak)
- Sharak, Sistan and Baluchestan (شارك - Shārak)
- Sharak Rural District (دهستان شارک), Sistan and Baluchestan
- Sharak, Zanjan (شرك - Sharak)
