= Kushat-e Avval =

Kushat-e Avval كوشات اول
- Village
- Interactive map of Kushat-e Avval
- Country: Iran
- Province: Sistan and Baluchestan
- County: Qasr-e Qand
- Bakhsh: Central
- Rural District: Holunchekan

Population (2006)
  - Total: 116
- Time zone: UTC+3:30 (IRST)
  - Summer (DST): UTC+4:30 (IRDT)

Kushat-e Avval (Persian: كوشات اول, also Romanized as Kūshāt-e Avval) is a village in Holunchekan Rural District in the Central District of Qasr-e Qand County, Sistan and Baluchestan Province, Iran. At the 2006 census, its population was 116, in 21 families.
