= Hamiri Rural District =

Rural district in Sistan and Baluchestan province, Iran

Hamiri Rural District Persian: دهستان حمیری
- Rural District
- Location within Iran
- Coordinates: 25°55′55″N 60°31′04″E
- Country: Iran
- Province: Sistan and Baluchestan
- County: Qasr-e Qand
- District: Sarbuk
- Capital: Hamiri

Population (2016)
  - Total: 8,771
- Time zone: UTC+3:30 (IRST)

Hamiri Rural District (Persian: دهستان حمیری) is in Sarbuk District of Qasr-e Qand County, Sistan and Baluchestan province, Iran. Its capital is the village of Hamiri.

== History ==
After the 2011 National Census, Qasr-e Qand District was separated from Nik Shahr County, and Talang Rural District from Chabahar County, in the establishment of Qasr-e Qand County, and Hamiri Rural District was created in the new Sarbuk District.

== Demographics ==
=== Population ===
At the time of the 2016 census, the rural district's population was 8,771 in 2,132 households. The most populous of its 33 villages was Hamiri, with 2,236 people.
