= Baloch–Portuguese conflicts =

1505–1619 conflicts

- Part of Portuguese presence in Asia
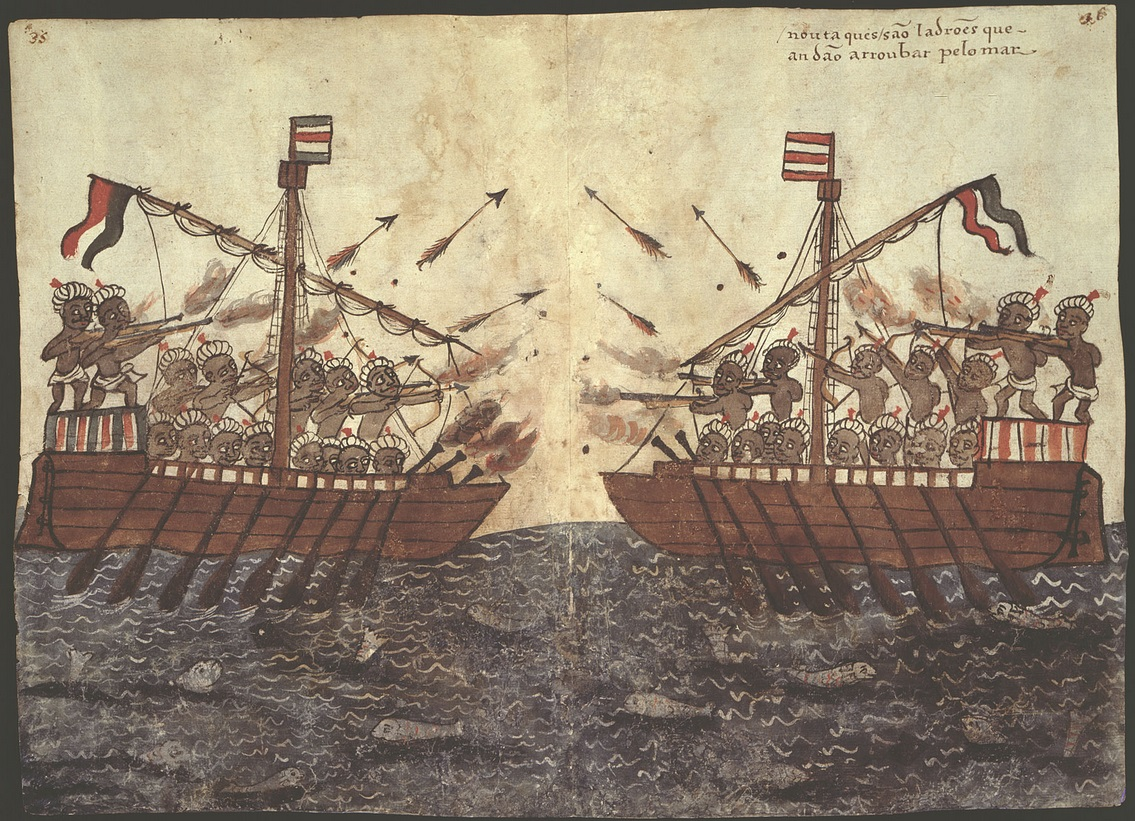
- Portuguese illustration of Nautaques — Códice Casanatense, c. 1540
Date	c. 1505 – c. 1619
Location	Indian Ocean

Belligerents
Kingdom of Portugal; Hormuz	Baloch; Nautaques

Commanders and leaders
Afonso de Albuquerque; Manuel de Lima; Luís Figueira (Portugal) Luís de Almeida (Portugal) Rui Gonçalves da Câmara (Portugal) Pedro Homem Pereira (Portugal) Rui Freire de Andrade	Hammal Baloch (POW); Malik of Makran

The Baloch–Portuguese conflicts were a series of military engagements between the Kingdom of Portugal and the Baloch people from c. 1505 to c. 1619.

== Background ==
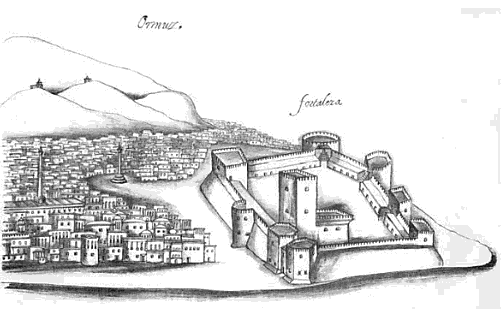
The city and fortress of Hormuz — Gaspar Correia in Lendas da Índia, 16th century

The first Portuguese campaign into the Persian Gulf occurred in 1507, when Afonso de Albuquerque attacked and occupied the island of Hormuz and other coastal regions of Oman. To maintain its trade, Portugal had to challenge or suppress any competitor ports and secure shipping into the Gulf.

A threat soon emerged to the Portuguese, as well as to Persia and Hormuz, who also benefited from the trade: the "Nautaques", the term used by the Portuguese to refer to the Baloch of the Makran coast, whom they labeled as pirates. Under the pretext of counter piracy in the Persian Gulf, Afonso de Albuquerque decided to take action against them to secure trade routes.

== Incidents and Engagements ==
=== Early actions under Albuquerque ===
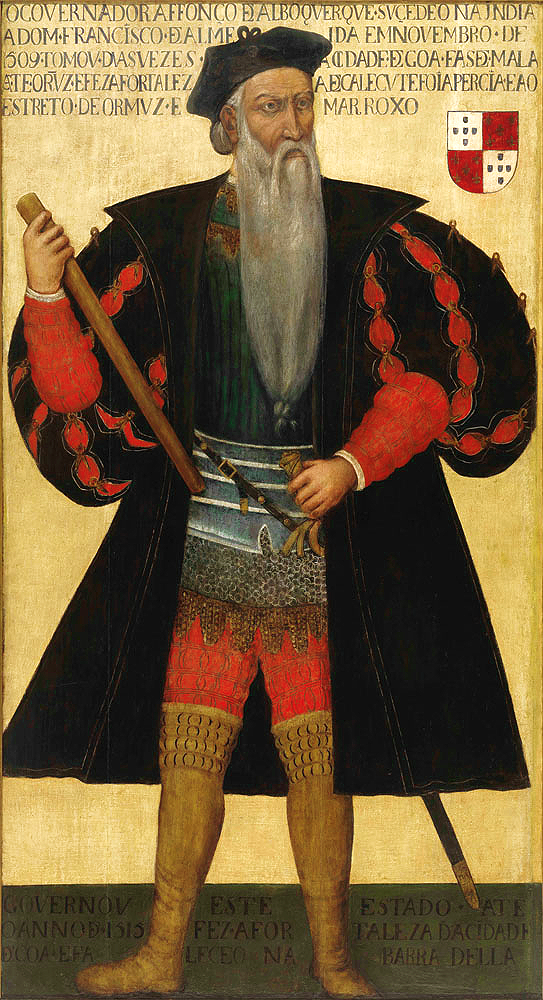
Portrait of Afonso de Albuquerque, Viceroy of Portuguese India" (after 1545), by Unknown. At the National Museum of Ancient Art, Lisbon

Since the entire Persian Gulf had been in political and administrative turmoil since 1505, Afonso de Albuquerque took offensive actions against the Nautaques. He captured several towns along the Makran coast and brought their people under his rule. Faria y Sousa, in his account of the conquests under King Manuel I of Portugal and Viceroy Dom Francisco de Almeida, mentions several towns and ports of the Makran coast that came under Portuguese rule:

The first beginning to the Westward, commences at the Mouth of the Red Sea in 12 d. 40 m. of North Latitude, and reaches to the Gulf of Persia… The second division, containing 200 Leagues, from Cape Jacques to the Mouth of the Indus is called Chirman, divided into the two Kingdoms, Macran (Makran) and Madel, with these towns, Guadel (Gwadar), Calara, Tibique, Calamate (Kalmat), Goadel and Diul, this Coast is barren and much of it desert, because of the shoal Water. The third contains 150 Leagues, 38 from Diul to Cape Jaquete, thence to Dio in the Kingdom Guzarata…

Despite the King of Hormuz paying protection money (muqar-rariyah) to the Nautaques to discourage them from attacking ships traveling to and from the port, this solution did not ensure complete safety, as the attacks persisted. Consequently, the King of Hormuz maintained a flotilla to guard the Nautaques coast, a task that was later assumed by Portuguese vessels after 1515. That same year, Shah Ismail I requested Portuguese naval support to suppress the Nautaques based on Gwadar. A joint operation was carried out, although it only achieved temporary success.

=== 1547 attack and retaliation ===
In 1547, the Captain of Hormuz, Manuel de Lima, reported the capture of a Portuguese ship that had wrecked on a sandbank, where the Nautaques seized the merchandise and killed all but three of the Portuguese crew who managed to escape. The Nautaques had also attacked a Muslim vessel, wounding those who resisted them. Manuel de Lima intended to "plunder the coast of the Nautaques and to burn their terradas, as much as possible".

Portuguese officials fighting the Nautaques were accustomed to appropriating necessary supplies from ships anchored in the Hormuz roadstead before sailing for battle. However, around 1540, Salghur Shah II wrote to King John III of Portugal that Portuguese officials were taking supplies even when there was no imminent threat. The King of Hormuz also noted that for the past two years, the Nautaques had been inactive at sea since their chiefs had burnt their fleet.

=== Portuguese raids on Makran (1549) ===
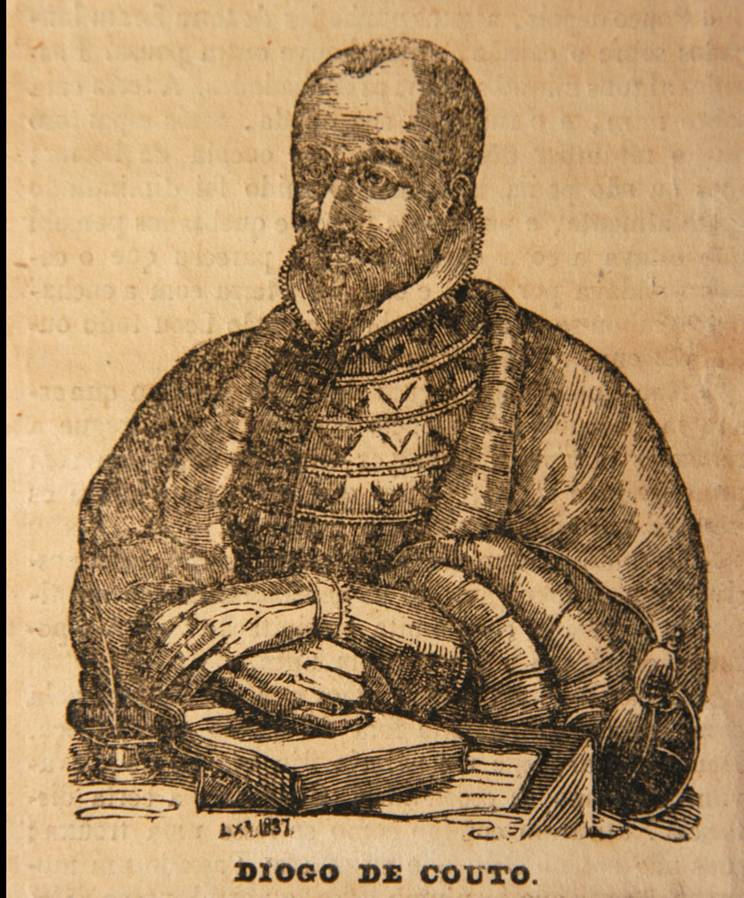
Chronicler Diogo do Couto

Diogo do Couto's chronicle reports a 1549 operation involving a Portuguese fleet led by Luís Figueira. The fleet was commissioned by the rulers of lower Sindh (likely the Tarkhans) to raid Balochi settlements. He notes:

They sailed along the coasts of the Nautaques, attacking some of their ports and settlements, in which process they did some damage. And while on that [coast], one of our ships ran aground, in an area where the people of the land came upon them, and they cut off the heads of all the Portuguese, and took the ship with all its artillery, without our people being able to resist; and things went from bad to worse, because another ship was caught on a sandbank, where it was lost, but the people on board escaped in the other ships.

=== Ottoman campaign against Hormuz (1552–1554) ===
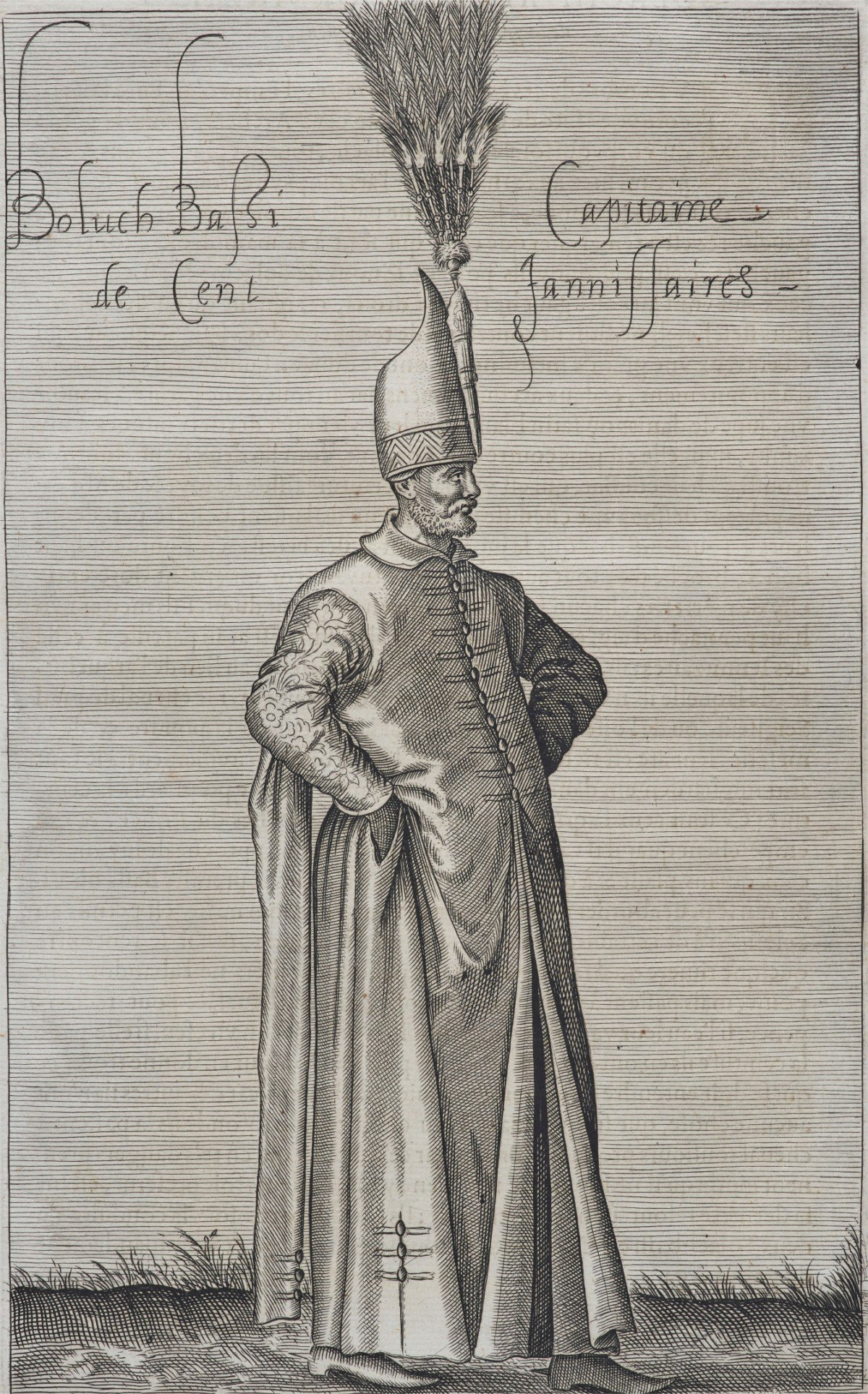
A Baloch chief in the Ottoman Empire, 1580

An Ottoman fleet, commanded by Admiral Seydi Ali Reis and dispatched by Sultan Suleiman the Magnificent, aimed to punish the Portuguese and safeguard Hajj pilgrim ships. Malik Jalal, the ruler of Makran, and his administration supported the Ottoman fleet with material aid, facilities, and ships. Seydi Ali's campaign eventually ended in failure.

=== Portuguese punitive expeditions ===
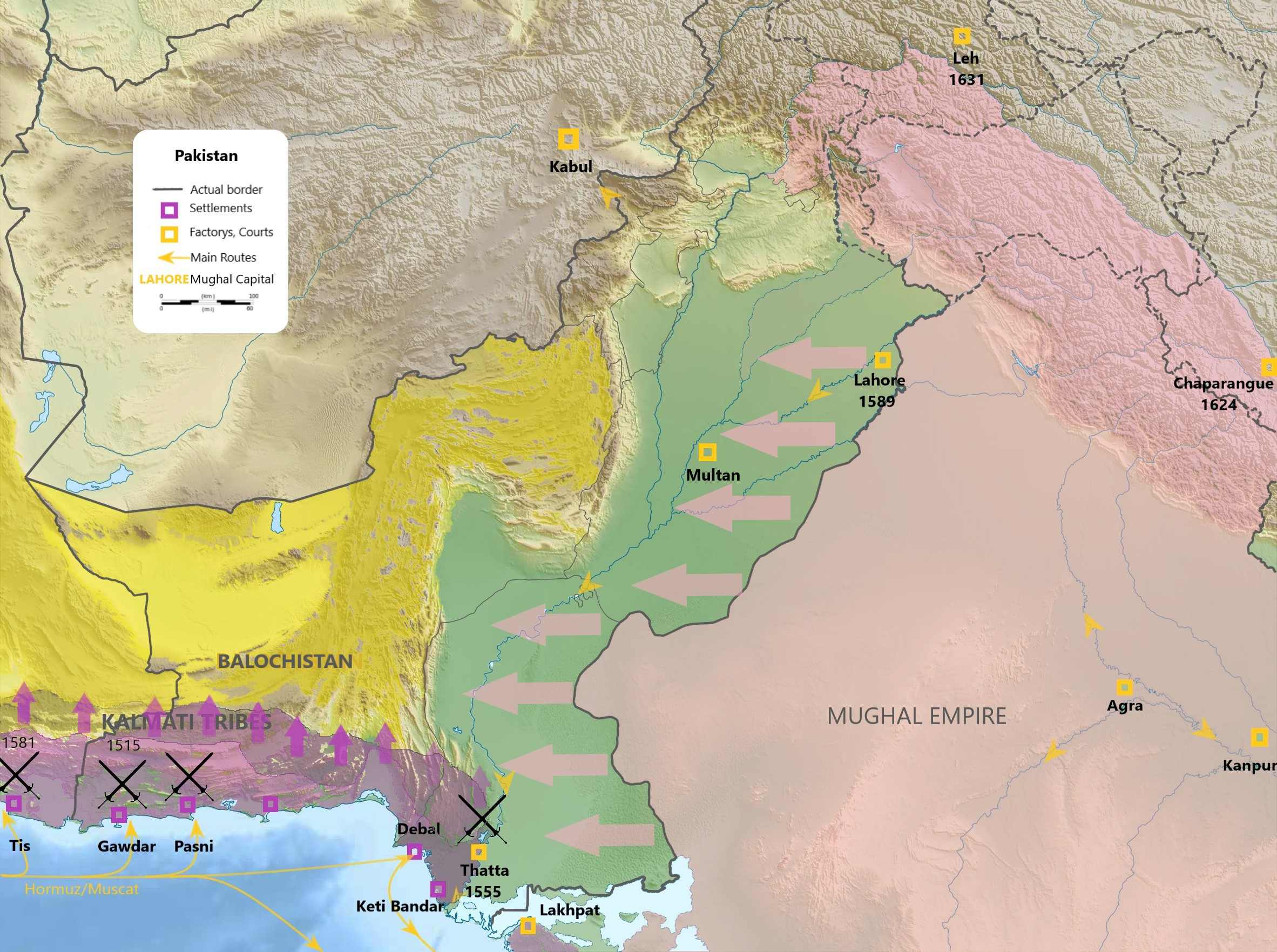
Portuguese presence in Makran

==== 1581 expedition ====
After the plunder of Muscat by Mir Ali Beg in 1581, Dom Luís de Almeida was ordered to follow him. However, he instead opted to take his own initiative and raided the Makran coast.

After assembling a fleet, Almeida sailed for Pasni, a city that Couto described as "very lovely, and located on the open seacoast." Although many inhabitants had fled to the interior, Almeida's men sacked the city until nothing remained and then burned it, along with 47–50 longboats at the harbor.

The fleet then sailed from Pasni to Gwadar. Anticipating the attack, the inhabitants had already fled, offering no resistance and allowing the Portuguese to freely collect prizes and supplies. Afterward, the fleet sailed to Tiz, where they carried out their final raid further east at Kalmat. This area was inhabited by a people distinct from the Baloch, whom Couto called the "Abindos, barbarous and ferocious people".

The attack of 1581, which left a mark on the memory of the people of Balochistan for centuries to come, was probably the most brutal and atrocious. It was likely a punitive action against the coastal population who were providing help and provisions to Ottoman Turkish fleets.

In Balochi literature the ballads recount a series of land skirmishes and naval engagements, where in the final battle, Hammal Kalmati (or Hammal Jîhand) was defeated, captured, and deported to either Goa or Portugal. The Portuguese persuaded Hammal to adopt European customs and marry within their culture, which he refused. Efforts to secure his release failed, and he ultimately died captive. It is believed that after Hammal's capture, the Portuguese began ransacking the coastal towns of Makran. Pasni, Gwadar and Tiz were all again looted and burnt down in 1581.

Two years later, in 1583, forces led by the Malik of Makran successfully repelled a Portuguese attack on Pasni.

=== Piracy in the Persian Gulf (1600–1619) ===
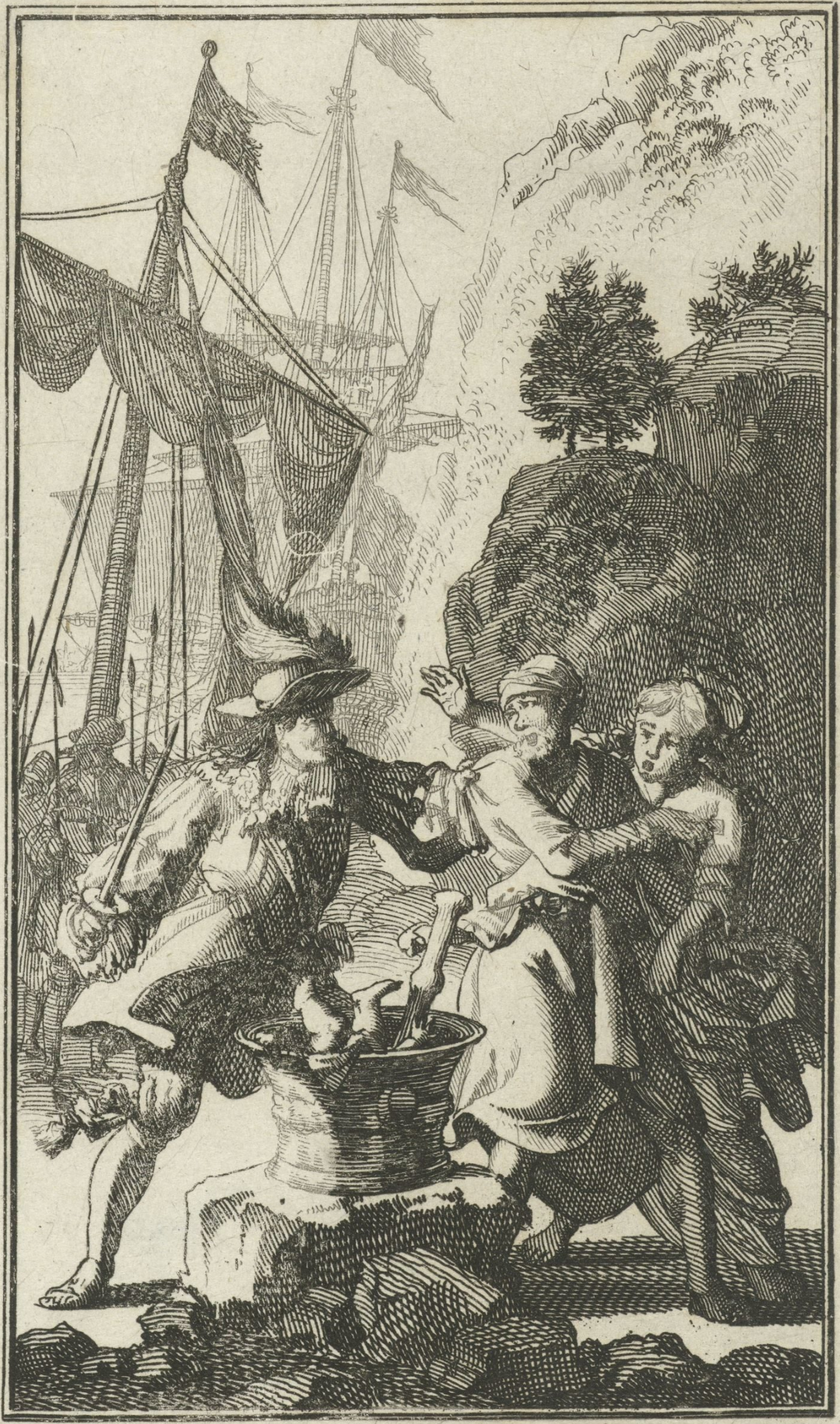
1689 engraving depicting Capitão Geral Rui Freire de Andrada

After the year 1600, piracy increased significantly in the Persian Gulf, allegedly supported by Shah Abbas I. The total number of Persian vessels was estimated at 1,200, with 800 belonging to the Shah and his allies.

To combat this rising piracy, Philip I of Portugal, revived the function of capitão-mor do mar in 1609. This commander was given one galleon plus the foists in Hormuz with the duty of patrolling the Nakhiloo area. This measure was effective, as the Niquilus requested a truce, which lasted until 1614.

Despite welcoming Portuguese diplomatic overtures, the Safavids continued to put pressure on the Portuguese. In 1615, using 300 terradas with the help of the Niquelus and Nautaques, the Safavids launched attacks on Portuguese vessels in the Persian Gulf and the Gulf of Oman.

Finally, in 1619, Lisbon sent Rui Freire de Andrade to the Persian Gulf. His mission was to reinforce Portuguese control over their territories, eliminate the Niquelus and the coastal settlements on either side of the Gulf, and expel the English from Jask. On one of these punitive expeditions, the Nautaques were practically exterminated.

== Aftermath ==
Balochi mercenaries later served as soldiers and armed retainers for several Gulf rulers, particularly those in Oman, where their service to the Ya'rubi imams is recorded from the 16th and 17th centuries.

According to Balochi epic traditions, various heroes are said to have conquered territories outside of Balochistan without establishing rule under their name.

One such figure is Shahdad Chota, a native of Balochistan who allegedly laid siege to the Portuguese at Fort Jesus. Although he defeated the Portuguese, Shahdad Chota is not mentioned in textual history of East Africa and is only remembered by the Baloch community in the region.

== Bibliography ==
- Dashti, Naseer (2012). The Baloch and Balochistan: A Historical Account from the Beginning to the Fall of the Baloch State. Trafford. ISBN 978-1466958968.
- Floor, Willem M. (2017). "Omani-Portuguese Maritime Activities (1500-1650 CE)". In Al Salami, Abdulrahman; Staples, Eric (eds.). Oman: A Maritime History. Georg Olms Verlag. ISBN 9783487153902.
- Badalkhan, Sabir (July 2000). "Portuguese encounters with coastal Makran Baloch during the sixteenth century. Some references from a Balochi heroic epic". Journal of the Royal Asiatic Society of Great Britain & Ireland. 10 (2): 153–169. doi:10.1017/S1356186300012438.
- Floor, Willem M. (2006). A political and economic history of five port cities, 1500-1730. Washington, DC: Mage Publishers. ISBN 1933823127.
- Subrahmanyam, Sanjay (March 19, 2024). Across the Green Sea: Histories from the Western Indian Ocean, 1440-1640. University of Texas Press. ISBN 9781477328774.
- Couto, Dejanirah (2008). Revisiting Hormuz: Portuguese Interactions in the Persian Gulf Region in the Early Modern Period. Otto Harrassowitz Verlag. ISBN 978-3447057318.
- Lutfi, Ameem (2018). Conquest without Rule: Baloch Portfolio Mercenaries in the Indian Ocean (Thesis). Duke University.
