= Kuchu =

Kuchu may refer to:

- Kuchu, Iran
- Kuchu, son and heir of Ögedei Khan
- Kuchu, a word for "homosexual" used in Uganda, see Call Me Kuchu
