= Gorban (disambiguation) =

Gorban may refer to:

== People ==
- Alexander Nikolaevich Gorban, a scientist
- Andrei Gorban, a professional tennis player
- Boris Gorban, an athlete
- Valeriy Gorban, a rally driver

== Places ==
- Gorban, a commune in Iaşi County, Romania
- Gorban, Qasr-e Qand, a village in Holunchekan Rural District in the Central District of Qasr-e Qand County, Sistan and Baluchestan Province, Iran
