= Sarbuk =

City in Sistan and Baluchestan province, Iran

Sarbuk Persian: ساربوک
- City
- Location within Iran
- Coordinates: 26°11′36″N 60°35′48″E
- Country: Iran
- Province: Sistan and Baluchestan
- County: Qasr-e Qand
- District: Sarbuk

Population (2016)
  - Total: 2,448
- Time zone: UTC+3:30 (IRST)

Sarbuk (Persian: ساربوک) (Note: Also romanized as Sārbūk; also known as Sabū, Sar Bug, Sarbak, Sārbak, and Sārbūg) is a city in, and the capital of, Sarbuk District of Qasr-e Qand County, Sistan and Baluchestan province, Iran. It also serves as the administrative center for Sarbuk Rural District.

== Demographics ==
=== Population ===
At the time of the 2006 National Census, Sarbuk's population was 2,184 in 428 households, when it was a village in Sarbuk Rural District of the former Qasr-e Qand District of Nik Shahr County. The following census in 2011 counted 2,506 people in 587 households. The 2016 census measured the population of the village as 2,448 people in 631 households, by which time the district had been separated from the county in the establishment of Qasr-e Qand County. The rural district was transferred to the new Sarbuk District. It was the most populous village in its rural district.

After the census, the village of Sarbuk was elevated to the status of a city.
