= Karchan =

Karchan (Persian: كارچان) may refer to:

- Karchan, Markazi
- Karchan, Qasr-e Qand, Sistan and Baluchestan Province
