= Getti =

Getti or Geti or Gatti (Persian: گتي) may refer to:

- Getti, Hormozgan
- Gatti, Khash, Sistan and Baluchestan Province
- Gatti, Nik Shahr, Sistan and Baluchestan Province
- Gatti, Qasr-e Qand, Sistan and Baluchestan Province
- Gatti, Faisalbad, a village in Punjab, Pakistan

== See also ==
- Arturo Gatti (1972–2009), Italian Canadian professional boxer
