= Dansar, Qasr-e Qand =

Village in Sistan and Baluchestan province, Iran

Dansar Persian: دن سر
- Village
- Location within Iran
- Coordinates: 25°49′07″N 61°01′19″E
- Country: Iran
- Province: Sistan and Baluchestan
- County: Qasr-e Qand
- District: Talang
- Rural District: Talang

Population (2016)
  - Total: 570
- Time zone: UTC+3:30 (IRST)

Dansar (Persian: دن سر) (Note: Also known as Danāsar, Daneh Sar, and Sar) is a village in, and the capital of, Talang Rural District of Talang District, Qasr-e Qand County, Sistan and Baluchestan province, Iran.

== Demographics ==
=== Population ===
At the time of the 2006 National Census, the village's population was 530 in 111 households, when it was in Polan District of Chabahar County. The census in 2011 counted 495 people in 116 households. The 2016 census measured the population of the village as 570 people in 148 households, by which time the rural district had been separated from the county in the establishment of Qasr-e Qand County and transferred to the new Talang District.
