= Shudi =

Shudi may refer to:

- Burkat Shudi, harpsichord maker
- Shudi, Iran, a village
