= Hammal Jiand =

16th century Sultan of Makran

Sultan of Makran
- Reign: Unknown
- Predecessor: Mir Ismail Hot
- Born: Unknown; Kalmat, Sultanate of Makran
- Died: 1581; Goa, Portuguese India or Portugal
- House: Kalmati
- Father: Mir Jiand Khan
- Mother: Maho Hot
- Religion: Zikrism
- Military career
- Allegiance: Sultanate of Makran
- Conflicts: Baloch–Portuguese conflicts

Mir Hammal-i-Jiand Khan Hot Kalmati (Balochi: میر ھَمّل جیھند خان ھوت کلمتی) was the Sultan of Makran during the 16th century. He was also the chief of the Kalmatis and is regarded as an anti-imperial folk hero of the Baloch people for spearheading military campaigns against the Portuguese invasions.

== History ==
=== Name and title ===
Hammal lived during the 15th century and his father, Jiand was the ruler of Makran. He is best known for his resistance against Portuguese incursions, particularly during the attacks on coastal towns like Pasni and Gawadar.

=== Hammal and Portuguese conflicts ===
When the Portuguese were expanding their influence along the coasts of Makran, which is part of present-day Balochistan in Pakistan. In 1498, the Portuguese admiral and explorer Vasco da Gama reached the shores of India. After reaching India, the Portuguese established a base there and engaged in piracy and plundering of merchant ships at sea. The Portuguese engaged in rampant murder and plunder at sea without any hindrance.

As Afonso de Albuquerque had already gained control of the southern coasts of the Persian Gulf and the Oman coasts, the Portuguese attacked the coasts of Balochistan several times, captured several places and brought the people to their rule and finally, they also captured or destroyed many trade ships and killed their sailors. Due to this reason, Mir Hammal decided that he would take revenge and fight the Portuguese.

Balochi oral sources claim that when the Portuguese invaded their coast, the Baloch organised themselves and were able to expel the invaders, defending their land, sea and trade. However, one must be careful when reading about these oral sources, as they can be considerably distorted or based on inventions. It gives rise to folk legends that will very easily simplify and embellish the past.

In 1549, a Portuguese fleet under the command of Luís Figueira,at the request of the servants of lower Sindh, raided Baloch settlements along the Makran coast. The Baloch defeated them, killing all the Portuguese on board and capturing the ship along with its artillery.

Finally, a peace treaty was reached between the two sides. Both sides signed a ceasefire and the Portuguese pledged not to approach and not to attack ships traveling on the coast of Makran. In return, Mir Hammal assured Portuguese that they could freely make use of this route for trade.

=== 1581 Portuguese campaign, capture and death ===
After assembling a fleet, Dom Luís de Almeida sailed for Pasni, a city that historian Diogo Couto described as "very lovely, and located on the open seacoast." Although many inhabitants had fled to the interior, Almeida's men sacked the city until nothing remained and then burned it, along with 47–50 longboats at the harbour.

The fleet then sailed from Pasni to Gwadar. Anticipating the attack, the inhabitants had already fled, offering no resistance and allowing the Portuguese to freely collect prizes and supplies. Afterward, the fleet sailed to Tiz, where they carried out their final raid further east at Kalmat. This area was inhabited by a people distinct from the Baloch, whom Couto called the "Abindos, barbarous and ferocious people" .

The attack of 1581, which left a mark on the memory of the people of Balochistan for centuries to come, was probably the most brutal and atrocious. It was likely a punitive action against the coastal population who were providing help and provisions to Ottoman Turkish fleets.

In Balochi literature the ballads recount a series of land skirmishes and naval engagements, where in the final battle, Hammal was defeated, captured, and deported to either Portuguese Goa or Portugal. The Portuguese persuaded Hammal to adopt European customs and marry within their culture, which he refused. Efforts to secure his release failed, and he ultimately died captive. It is believed that after Hammal's capture, the Portuguese began ransacking the coastal towns of Makran. Pasni, Gwadar and Tiz were all again looted and burnt down in 1581.

== Literary significance ==
Mir Hammal Jiand is a significant figure in Baloch history, culture and literature, particularly noted for his role during the conflicts with Portuguese forces in the 16th century. He is celebrated as a heroic leader and is often compared to other notable Baloch leaders like Mir Chakar Khan Rind.

Mahganj, the wife of Mir Hammal, who was killed by the Portuguese, has inspired Balochi romantic stories and appeared in the works of Balochi writers and Balochi folkloric. Hammal and Mahganj are central figures in a poignant Balochi love story that has transcended generations, symbolizing themes of bravery, love, and resistance against oppression.

The first Balochi feature film, Hammal O Mahganj, was produced by Anwar Iqbal and released in Pakistan in 1976.
