= Pasak =

Pasak may refer to:

- Pasak, Iran, a village in Sistan and Baluchestan Province
- Pasak, West Azerbaijan, a village in West Azerbaijan Province
- Yawara

== See also ==
- Pa Sak (disambiguation)
