= Zonar =

Zonar may refer to:

- Joannes Zonaras
- Zonar, Iran
