= Zunar =

Zunar may refer to:

- Zulkiflee Anwar Haque, Malaysian cartoonist
- Zunnar, a belt won by Christians in Jerusalem
- Zonnar, a village in Iran
