= Pa Sak =

Pa Sak may refer to:

- Pa Sak River in Thailand
- The name of several villages and tambons in Thailand:
  - Pa Sak, Chiang Rai
  - Pa Sak, Lamphun
  - Pa Sak, Phrae
  - Pa Sak, Phayao

== See also ==
- Pasak (disambiguation)
