= Sharak Rural District =

Rural district in Sistan and Baluchestan province, Iran

Sharak Rural District Persian: دهستان شارک
- Rural District
- Location within Iran
- Coordinates: 25°57′39″N 60°57′02″E
- Country: Iran
- Province: Sistan and Baluchestan
- County: Qasr-e Qand
- District: Talang
- Capital: Sharag

Population (2016)
  - Total: 4,577
- Time zone: UTC+3:30 (IRST)

Sharak Rural District (Persian: دهستان شارک) is in Talang District of Qasr-e Qand County, Sistan and Baluchestan province, Iran. Its capital is the village of Sharag.

== History ==
After the 2011 National Census, Qasr-e Qand District was separated from Nik Shahr County, and Talang Rural District from Chabahar County, in the establishment of Qasr-e Qand County, and Sharak Rural District was created in the new Talang District.

== Demographics ==
=== Population ===
At the time of the 2016 census, the rural district's population was 4,577 in 1,351 households. The most populous of its 25 villages was Kahn-e Bala, with 1,148 people.
