= Shir Mohammad Bazar, Chabahar =

Shir Mohammad Bazar شيرمحمدبازار
- Village
- Location within Iran
- Coordinates: 25°36′21″N 61°02′05″E
- Country: Iran
- Province: Sistan and Baluchestan
- County: Chabahar
- Bakhsh: Polan
- Rural District: Polan

Population (2006)
  - Total: 178
- Time zone: UTC+3:30 (IRST)
  - Summer (DST): UTC+4:30 (IRDT)

Shir Mohammad Bazar (Persian: شيرمحمدبازار, also Romanized as Shīr Moḩammad Bāzār and Shīrmoḩammad Bāzār) is a village in Polan Rural District, Polan District, Chabahar County, Sistan and Baluchestan Province, Iran. At the 2006 census, its population was 178, in 46 families.
