= Towhan =

Towhan طوحان
- Village
- Location within Iran
- Coordinates: 28°37′44″N 57°48′13″E
- Country: Iran
- Province: Kerman
- County: Jiroft
- Bakhsh: Central
- Rural District: Dowlatabad

Population (2006)
  - Total: 1,335
- Time zone: UTC+3:30 (IRST)
  - Summer (DST): UTC+4:30 (IRDT)

Towhan (Persian: طوحان, also Romanized as Ţowhān; also known as Tehun, Toohan Olya, Toohan Sofla, Ţowhān-e Jīroft, Ţūjān, Ţūjān-e Jīroft, Ţūjān-e ‘Olyā, and Ţūjān-e Soflā) is a village in Dowlatabad Rural District, in the Central District of Jiroft County, Kerman Province, Iran. At the 2006 census, its population was 1,335, in 281 families.
