= Tujan, Hormozgan =

Tujan توجن
- Village
- Location within Iran
- Coordinates: 26°24′55″N 58°05′08″E
- Country: Iran
- Province: Hormozgan
- County: Bashagard
- Bakhsh: Gafr and Parmon
- Rural District: Gafr and Parmon

Population (2006)
  - Total: 28
- Time zone: UTC+3:30 (IRST)
  - Summer (DST): UTC+4:30 (IRDT)

Tujan (Persian: توجن, also Romanized as Tūjan) is a village in Gafr and Parmon Rural District, Gafr and Parmon District, Bashagard County, Hormozgan Province, Iran. At the 2006 census, its population was 28, in 7 families.
