= Lalu Bazar, Chabahar =

Lalu Bazar للو بازار
- Village
- Location within Iran
- Coordinates: 25°36′33″N 61°08′22″E
- Country: Iran
- Province: Sistan and Baluchestan
- County: Chabahar
- Bakhsh: Polan
- Rural District: Polan

Population (2006)
  - Total: 1,070
- Time zone: UTC+3:30 (IRST)
  - Summer (DST): UTC+4:30 (IRDT)

Lalu Bazar (Persian: للو بازار, also Romanized as Lālū Bāzār and Lālū-ye Bāzār; also known as Lāleh Bāzār) is a village in Polan Rural District, Polan District, Chabahar County, Sistan and Baluchestan Province, Iran. At the 2006 census, its population was 1,070, in 183 families.
