= Qasr-e Qand =

City in Sistan and Baluchestan province, Iran

Qasr-e Qand Persian: قصرقند
- City
- Location within Iran
- Coordinates: 26°14′08″N 60°44′27″E
- Country: Iran
- Province: Sistan and Baluchestan
- County: Qasr-e Qand
- District: Central

Population (2016)
  - Total: 11,605
- Time zone: UTC+3:30 (IRST)

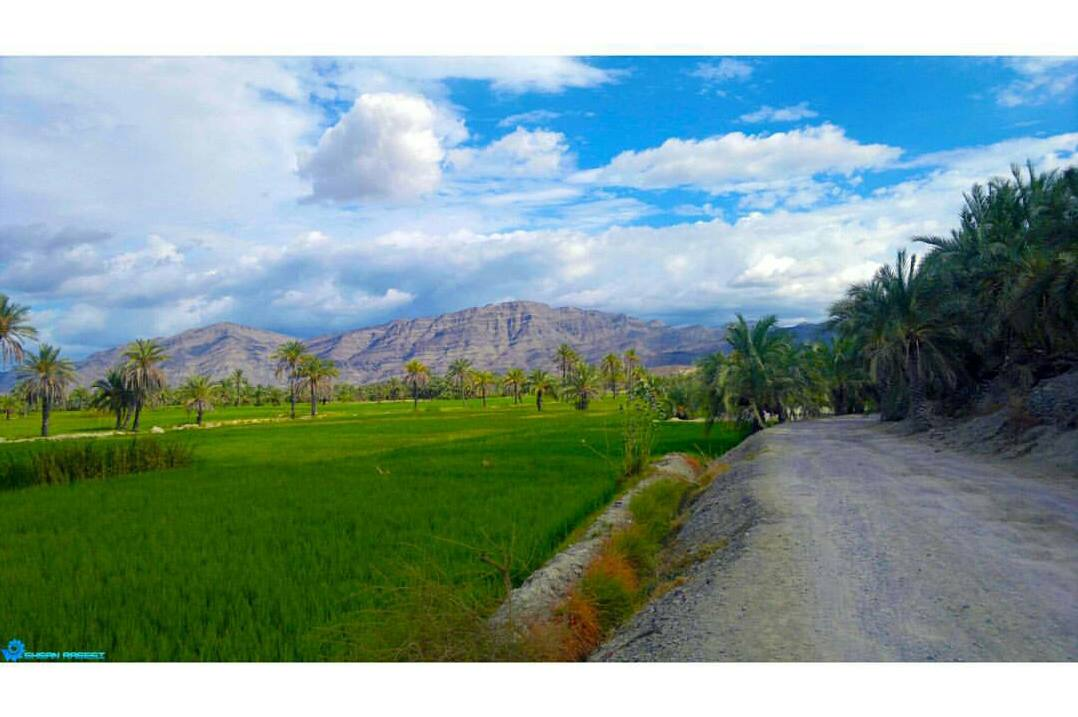
Qasr-e-Qand

Qasr-e Qand (Persian: قصرقند) (Note: Also romanized as Qaşr Qand and Qaşr-e Qand; also known as Barqān and Borgan) is a city in, and the capital of, the Central District of Qasr-e Qand County, Sistan and Baluchestan province, Iran, and also serves as capital of the county.

== Demographics ==
=== Population ===
At the time of the 2006 National Census, the city's population was 10,826 in 1,586 households, when it was capital of the former Qasr-e Qand District of Nik Shahr County. The following census in 2011 counted 8,563 people in 1,847 households. The 2016 census measured the population of the city as 11,605 people in 2,649 households, by which time the district had been separated from the county in the establishment of Qasr-e Qand County. Qasr-e Qand was transferred to the new Central District as the county's capital.
