= Qasr-e Qand District =

Former district in Sistan and Baluchestan province, Iran

Qasr-e Qand District Persian: بخش قصرقند
- Former District
- Location within Iran
- Coordinates: 26°10′N 60°49′E
- Country: Iran
- Province: Sistan and Baluchestan
- County: Nik Shahr
- Capital: Qasr-e Qand

Population (2011)
  - Total: 39,414
- Time zone: UTC+3:30 (IRST)

Qasr-e Qand District (Persian: بخش قصرقند) is a former administrative division of Nik Shahr County, Sistan and Baluchestan province, Iran. Its capital was the city of Qasr-e Qand.

== History ==
After the 2011 National Census, the district was separated from the county in the establishment of Qasr-e Qand County.

== Demographics ==
=== Population ===
At the time of the 2006 census, the district's population was 37,722 in 6,752 households. The following census in 2011 counted 39,414 people in 8,676 households.

=== Administrative divisions ===
Qasr-e Qand District Population
| Administrative Divisions | 2006 | 2011 |
|---|---|---|
| Holunchekan RD | 9,168 | 11,226 |
| Sarbuk RD | 17,728 | 19,625 |
| Qasr-e Qand (city) | 10,826 | 8,563 |
| Total | 37,722 | 39,414 |
RD = Rural District
