= Sarbuk District =

District in Sistan and Baluchestan province, Iran

Sarbuk District Persian: بخش ساربوك
- District
- Location within Iran
- Coordinates: 26°00′49″N 60°31′10″E
- Country: Iran
- Province: Sistan and Baluchestan
- County: Qasr-e Qand
- Capital: Sarbuk

Population (2016)
  - Total: 17,018
- Time zone: UTC+3:30 (IRST)

Sarbuk District (Persian: بخش ساربوك) is in Qasr-e Qand County, Sistan and Baluchestan province, Iran. Its capital is the city of Sarbuk.

== History ==
After the 2011 National Census, Qasr-e Qand District was separated from Nik Shahr County, and Talang Rural District from Chabahar County, in the establishment of Qasr-e Qand County, which was divided into three districts of two rural districts each, with Qasr-e Qand as its capital and only city at the time. After the census the village of Sarbuk was elevated to the status of a city.

== Demographics ==
=== Population ===
At the time of the 2016 census, the district's population was 17,018 inhabitants in 4,114 households.

=== Administrative divisions ===
Sarbuk District Population
Administrative Divisions	2016
Hamiri RD	8,771
Sarbuk RD	8,247
Sarbuk (city) (Note: Became a city after the 2016 census)	
Total	17,018
RD = Rural District
