= Sarbuk Rural District =

Rural district in Sistan and Baluchestan province, Iran

Sarbuk Rural District Persian: دهستان ساربوك
- Rural District
- Location within Iran
- Coordinates: 26°15′25″N 60°32′47″E
- Country: Iran
- Province: Sistan and Baluchestan
- County: Qasr-e Qand
- District: Sarbuk
- Capital: Sarbuk

Population (2016)
  - Total: 8,247
- Time zone: UTC+3:30 (IRST)

Sarbuk Rural District (Persian: دهستان ساربوك) is in Sarbuk District of Qasr-e Qand County, Sistan and Baluchestan province, Iran. It is administered from the city of Sarbuk.

== Demographics ==
=== Population ===
At the time of the 2006 National Census, the rural district's population (as a part of the former Qasr-e Qand District of Nik Shahr County) 17,728 in 3,384 households. There were 19,625 inhabitants in 4,326 households at the following census of 2011. The 2016 census measured the population of the rural district as 8,247 in 1,982 households, by which time the district had been separated from the county in the establishment of Qasr-e Qand County. The rural district was transferred to the new Sarbuk District. The most populous of its 19 villages was Sarbuk (now a city), with 2,448 people.
