= Central District (Qasr-e Qand County) =

District in Sistan and Baluchestan province, Iran

Central District (Qasr-e Qand County) Persian: بخش مرکزی شهرستان قصرقند
- District
- Location within Iran
- Coordinates: 26°18′N 60°49′E
- Country: Iran
- Province: Sistan and Baluchestan
- County: Qasr-e Qand
- Capital: Qasr-e Qand

Population (2016)
  - Total: 25,690
- Time zone: UTC+3:30 (IRST)

The Central District of Qasr-e Qand County (Persian: بخش مرکزی شهرستان قصرقند) is in Sistan and Baluchestan province, Iran. Its capital is the city of Qasr-e Qand.

== History ==
After the 2011 National Census, Qasr-e Qand District was separated from Nik Shahr County, and Talang Rural District from Chabahar County, in the establishment of Qasr-e Qand County, which was divided into three districts of two rural districts each, with Qasr-e Qand as its capital and only city at the time.

== Demographics ==
=== Population ===
At the time of the 2016 census, the district's population was 25,690 inhabitants in 6,282 households.

=== Administrative divisions ===
Central District (Qasr-e Qand County) Population
Administrative Divisions	2016
Hit RD	6,794
Holunchekan RD	7,291
Qasr-e Qand (city)	11,605
Total	25,690
RD = Rural District
