= Holunchekan Rural District =

Rural district in Sistan and Baluchestan province, Iran

Holunchekan Rural District Persian: دهستان هلونچگان
- Rural District
- Location within Iran
- Coordinates: 26°23′05″N 60°48′49″E
- Country: Iran
- Province: Sistan and Baluchestan
- County: Qasr-e Qand
- District: Central
- Capital: Holunchekan

Population (2016)
  - Total: 7,291
- Time zone: UTC+3:30 (IRST)

Holunchekan Rural District (Persian: دهستان هلونچگان) is in the Central District of Qasr-e Qand County, Sistan and Baluchestan province, Iran. Its capital is the village of Holunchekan.

== Demographics ==
=== Population ===
At the time of the 2006 National Census, the rural district's population (as a part of the former Qasr-e Qand District of Nik Shahr County) was 9,168 in 1,782 households. There were 11,226 inhabitants in 2,503 households at the following census of 2011.The 2016 census measured the population of the rural district as 7,291 in 1,843 households, by which time the district had been separated from the county in the establishment of Qasr-e Qand County. The rural district was transferred to the new Central District. The most populous of its 52 villages was Holunchekan, with 1,294 people.
