= Talang District =

District in Sistan and Baluchestan province, Iran

Talang District Persian: بخش تلنگ
- District
- Location within Iran
- Coordinates: 25°55′27″N 60°58′36″E
- Country: Iran
- Province: Sistan and Baluchestan
- County: Qasr-e Qand
- Capital: Talang

Population (2016)
  - Total: 18,368
- Time zone: UTC+3:30 (IRST)

Talang District (Persian: بخش تلنگ) is in Qasr-e Qand County, Sistan and Baluchestan province, Iran. Its capital is the village of Talang.

== History ==
After the 2011 National Census, Qasr-e Qand District was separated from Nik Shahr County, and Talang Rural District from Chabahar County, in the establishment of Qasr-e Qand County, which was divided into three districts of two rural districts each, with Qasr-e Qand as its capital and only city at the time.

== Demographics ==
=== Population ===
At the time of the 2016 census, the district's population was 18,368 inhabitants in 5,128 households.

=== Administrative divisions ===
Talang District Population
Administrative Divisions	2016
Sharak RD	4,577
Talang RD	13,791
Total	18,368
RD = Rural District
