= Talang Rural District (Qasr-e Qand County) =

Rural district in Sistan and Baluchestan province, Iran

Talang Rural District Persian: دهستان تلنگ
- Rural District
- Location within Iran
- Coordinates: 25°49′29″N 60°59′46″E
- Country: Iran
- Province: Sistan and Baluchestan
- County: Qasr-e Qand
- District: Talang
- Capital: Dansar

Population (2016)
  - Total: 13,791
- Time zone: UTC+3:30 (IRST)

Talang Rural District (Persian: دهستان تلنگ) is in Talang District of Qasr-e Qand County, Sistan and Baluchestan province, Iran. Its capital is the village of Dansar.

== Demographics ==
=== Population ===
At the time of the 2006 National Census, the rural district's population (as a part of Polan District in Chabahar County) was 14,251 in 3,064 households. There were 16,474 inhabitants in 3,964 households at the following census of 2011. The 2016 census measured the population of the rural district as 13,791 in 3,777 households, by which time the rural district had been separated from the county in the establishment of Qasr-e Qand County and transferred to the new Talang District. The most populous of its 52 villages was Dirman, with 826 people.
