= Qasr-e Qand County =

County in Sistan and Baluchestan province, Iran

Qasr-e Qand County Persian: شهرستان قصرقند
- County
- Location of Qasr-e Qand County in Sistan and Baluchestan province (bottom, purple)

- Location of Sistan and Baluchestan province in Iran
- Coordinates: 26°04′51″N 60°48′49″E
- Country: Iran
- Province: Sistan and Baluchestan
- Capital: Qasr-e Qand
- Districts: Central, Sarbuk, Talang

Population (2016)
  - Total: 61,076
- Time zone: UTC+3:30 (IRST)

Qasr-e Qand County (Persian: شهرستان قصرقند) is in Sistan and Baluchestan province, Iran. Its capital is the city of Qasr-e Qand.

== History ==
After the 2011 National Census, Qasr-e Qand District was separated from Nik Shahr County, and Talang Rural District from Chabahar County, in the establishment of Qasr-e Qand County, which was divided into three districts of two rural districts each, with Qasr-e Qand as its capital and only city at the time. After the 2016 census, the village of Sarbuk was elevated to the status of a city.

== Demographics ==
=== Population ===
At the time of the 2016 census, the county's population was 61,076 in 15,524 households.

=== Administrative divisions ===
Qasr-e Qand County's population and administrative structure are shown in the following table.

Qasr-e Qand County Population
Administrative Divisions	2016
Central District	25,690
Hit RD	6,794
Holunchekan RD	7,291
Qasr-e Qand (city)	11,605
Sarbuk District	17,018
Hamiri RD	8,771
Sarbuk RD	8,247
Sarbuk (city) (Note: Became a city after the 2016 census)	
Talang District	18,368
Sharak RD	4,577
Talang RD	13,791
Total	61,076
RD = Rural District

== See also ==
Media related to Qasr-e Qand County at Wikimedia Commons
