= Fashion in Iran =

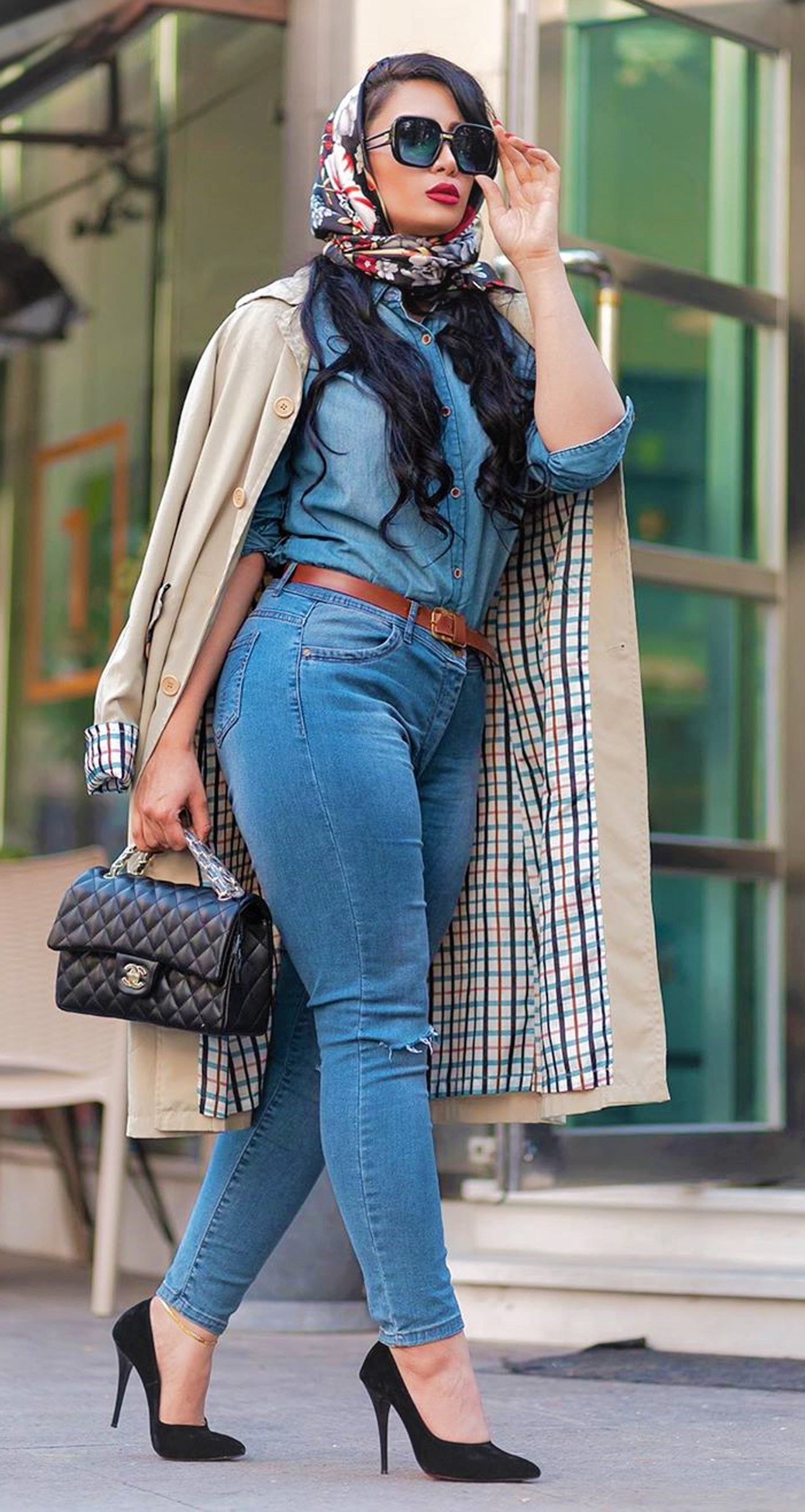
An Iranian woman in Tehran (2019)

Fashion in Iran has a cultural and economic impact on the county of Iran. During the Pahlavi era in the mid-1930s, Western fashion was introduced to Iran and greatly influenced women's style. Following the Iranian Revolution in 1979, the hijab became compulsory, impacting the creation of clothing style.

Beauty pageant festivals inside Iran were not held after the 1979 revolution, and the last selection ceremony of the beauty queen of Iran was held in 1978. After this, a high number of Iranian girls participated in the Beauty pageant and Miss Universe outside of Iran. Sahar Biniaz (Miss Universe Canada 2012) and Shermineh Shahrivar (Miss Germany and Miss Europe) are examples of Iranian models outside Iran. Social media networks have played a significant role in increasing the income from modeling in Iran. Additionally many Iranian fashion designers have found success living in the diaspora.

== History ==
=== Women's fashion in the Pahlavi era ===
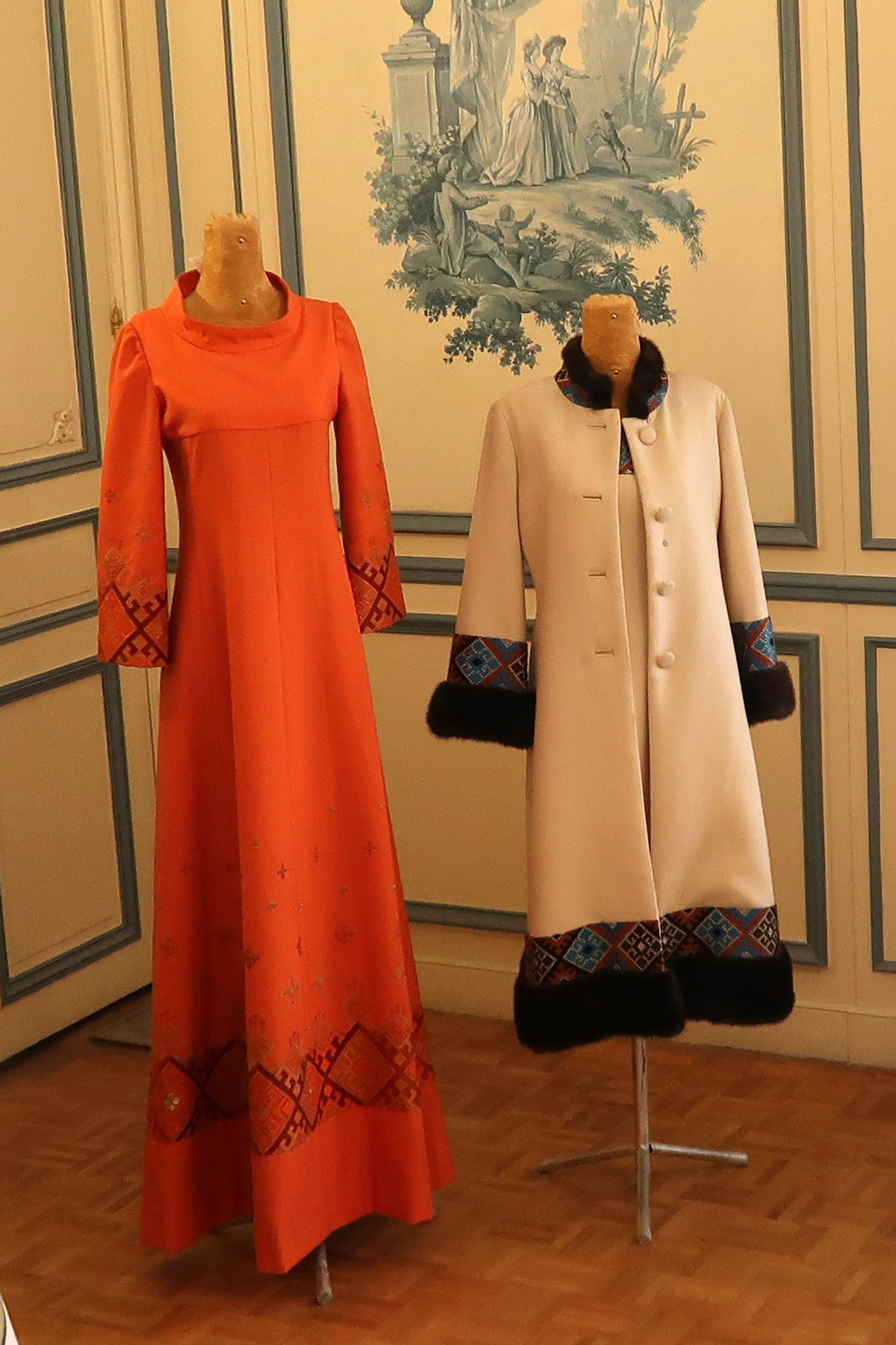
Attire belonging to Farah Pahlavi, the last Shahbanu of Iran, kept at Niavaran Complex

Attempts at changing dress norms (and perspectives toward it) occurred in mid-1930s when pro-Western ruler Reza Shah issued a decree banning all veils. Many types of male traditional clothing were also banned. Western historians state that this would have been a progressive step if women had indeed chosen to do it themselves, but instead this ban humiliated and alienated many Iranian women, since its effect was comparable to the hypothetical situation in which the European women had suddenly been ordered to go out topless into the street.

A far larger escalation of violence occurred in the summer of 1935 when Reza Shah ordered all men to wear European-style bowler hat, which was Western par excellence. This provoked massive non-violent demonstrations in July in the city of Mashhad. This decision by Reza Shah was criticized even by the British consul in Tehran. Later, official measures relaxed slightly during the reign of Mohammad Reza Pahlavi and wearing of the headscarf or chador was no longer an offence, but for his regime it became a significant hindrance to climbing the social ladder as it was considered a badge of backwardness and an indicator of being a member of the lower class.

A few years prior to the 1979 Iranian Revolution, a tendency towards questioning the relevance of Eurocentric gender roles as the model for Iranian society gained much ground among university students, and this sentiment was manifested in street demonstrations where many women from the non-veiled middle classes put on the veil and symbolically rejected the gender ideology of the Pahlavi regime and its aggressive deculturalization. Wearing of headscarf and chador was one of main symbols of the 1979 revolution, Wearing headscarves and chadors was used as a significant populist tool and Iranian veiled women played an important rule in the revolution's victory. Since hijab was legally imposed on all Iranian women in 1984, post revolutionary Iranian women's fashion has seen Iranian women attempt to work within the narrow confines of the Islamic modesty code, with the typical attire gradually evolving from the standard black chador to a rousari (simple headscarf) combined with other colorful elements of clothing.

=== Hijab in the Islamic Republic ===
In Iran, since 1981, after the 1979 Iranian Revolution, the hijab has become compulsory. All women are required to wear loose-fitting clothing and a headscarf in public. In the Islamic law of Iran imposed shortly after the 1979 revolution, article 638 of 5th book of Islamic Penal Code (called Sanctions and deterrent penalties) women who do not wear a hijab may be imprisoned from ten days to two months, and/or required to pay fines from 50,000 up to 500,000 rials. Fines are recalculated in the courts to index for inflation. Article 639 of the same book says, two types of people shall be sentenced one year to ten years' imprisonment; first a person who establishes or directs a place of immorality or prostitution, second, a person who facilitates or encourages people to commit immorality or prostitution.

The festivals of the Beauty pageant inside Iran were not held after the 1979 revolution, and the last selection ceremony of the beauty queen of Iran was held in 1978 in this country. After this, a high number of Iranian girls participated in the Beauty pageant and Miss Universe outside of Iran. Sahar Biniaz (Miss Universe Canada 2012) and Shermineh Shahrivar (Miss Germany and Miss Europe) are examples of Iranian models outside Iran.

Girls of Enghelab was a series of protests against compulsory hijab in Iran. The protests were inspired by Vida Movahed, an Iranian woman known as the Girl of Enghelab Street, who stood in the crowd on a utility box in the Enghelab Street (Revolution Street) of Tehran on 27 December 2017, tied her hijab, a white headscarf, to a stick, and waved it to the crowd as a flag. She was arrested on that day and was released temporary on bail a month later, on 28 January 2018. Some people believe that Movahed's action was based on Masih Alinejad's call for White Wednesdays, a protest movement that the presenter at VOA Persian Television started in early 2017. Other women later re-enacted her protest and posted photos of their actions on social media. These women are described as the "Girls of Enghelab Street" and "The Girls Of Revolution Street" in the English sources.

Protests against the compulsory hijab have been common since 1979, with one of the largest protests taking place between 8 and 14 March 1979, beginning on International Women's Day and a day after hijab rules were introduced by the Islamic Republic. Protests against mandatory hijab rules continued, such as during the 2019–2020 protests, when protesters attacked a Guidance Patrol van and freed two detained women.

In 2020, two representatives of the Supreme Leader Ali Khamenei, separately said that improperly veiled women should be made to feel "unsafe". The representatives later backtracked and said that their comments were misunderstood. Among the general population, an independent survey conducted in the same year showed that 58% of Iranians did not believe in hijab altogether, and 72% were against compulsory hijab rules. Only 15% insisted on the legal obligation to wear it in public.

In 2024, at a fashion exhibition held at Tehran's historic Saadabad Palace, young Iranian designers showcased vibrant, colorful garments, marking a departure from the traditionally dark, conservative attire mandated by the Islamic Republic since 1979. Garments ranged from black chadors to fitted floral coats and calligraphy-inspired pieces. Furthermore, Hadis Pazouki, head of the national fashion foundation, announced plans to promote Iranian fashion week at cities like Paris, Milan, and London.

As of 2025, regulations regarding conservative dress are to an extent no longer enforced in Iran, across Iran many women no longer cover their hair in public and wear shorts or expose their midriff. The Iranian government, however, still condemns dressing non-conservatively. Tehran Fashion Week was launched in 2025 and according to Iran International shows featured models without headscarves and many wore non-conservative tight-fitting western-style outfits.

Iran has an advanced leather industry for women's clothing, however, it needs technology development for export.

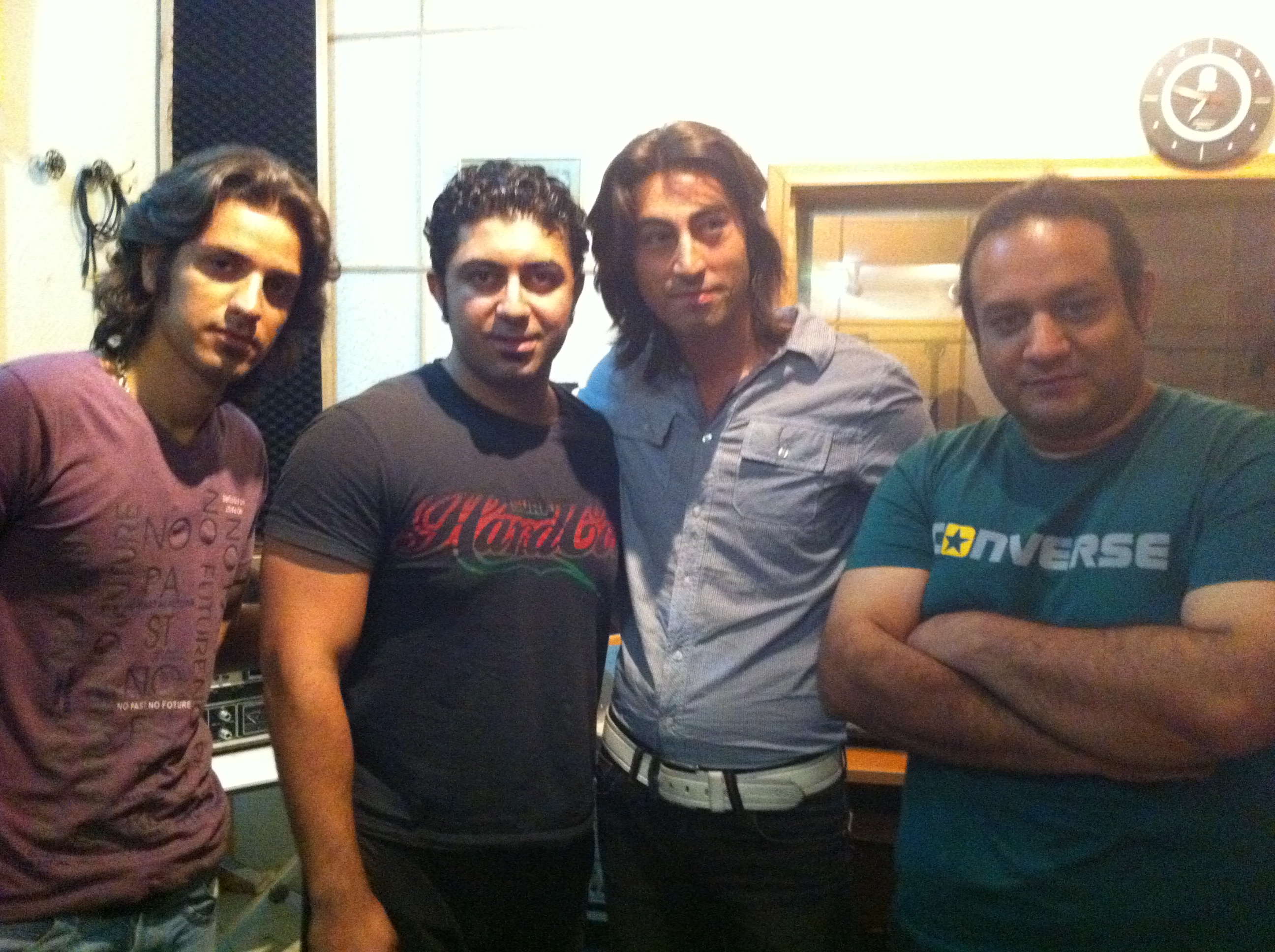
Common men's clothing in Tehran

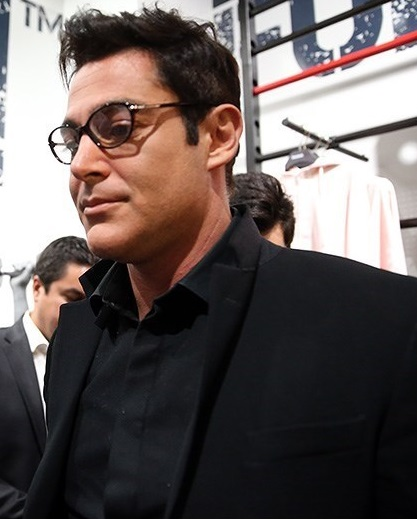
Reza Golzar, actor and model

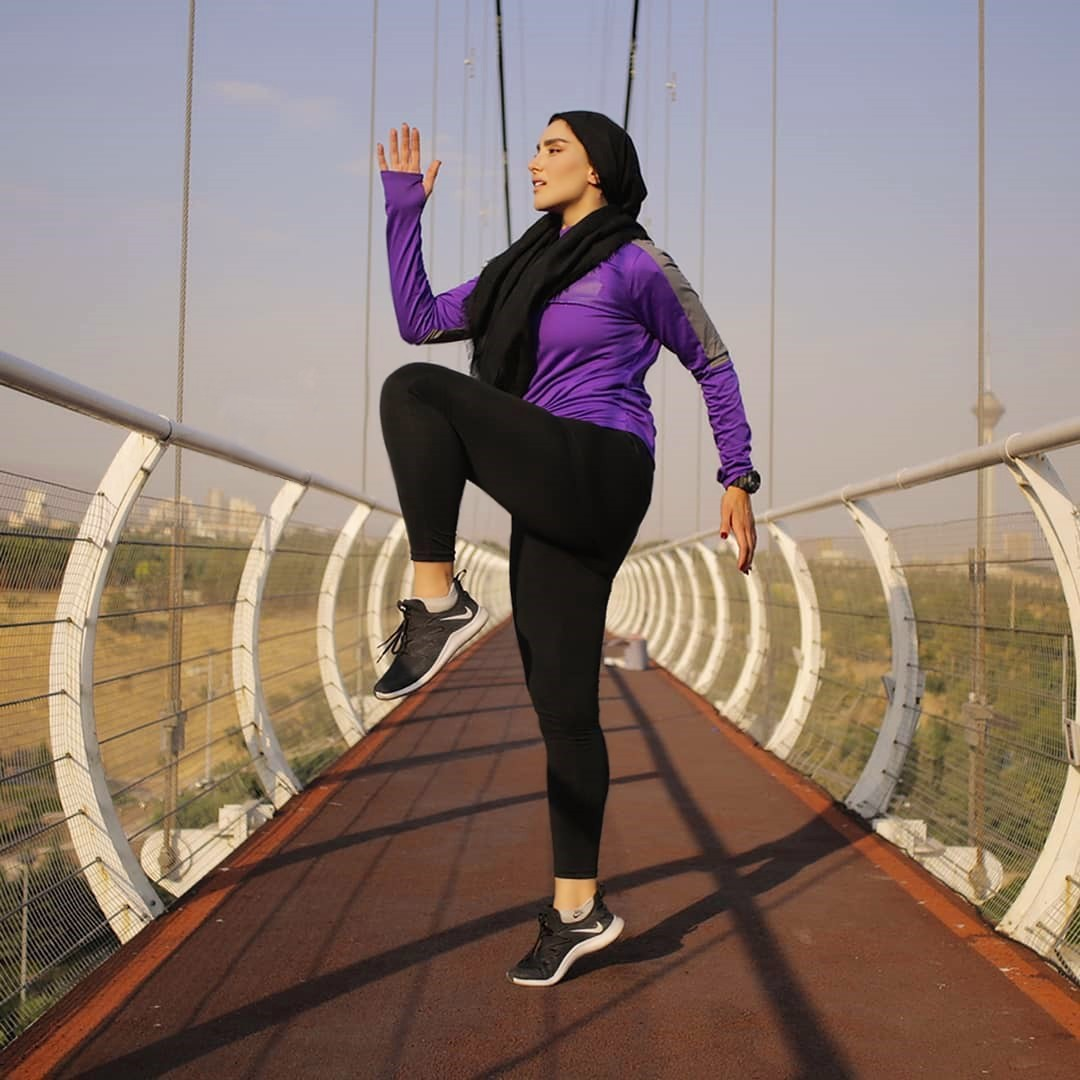
Fashion photography for sports outfit, near Milad Tower

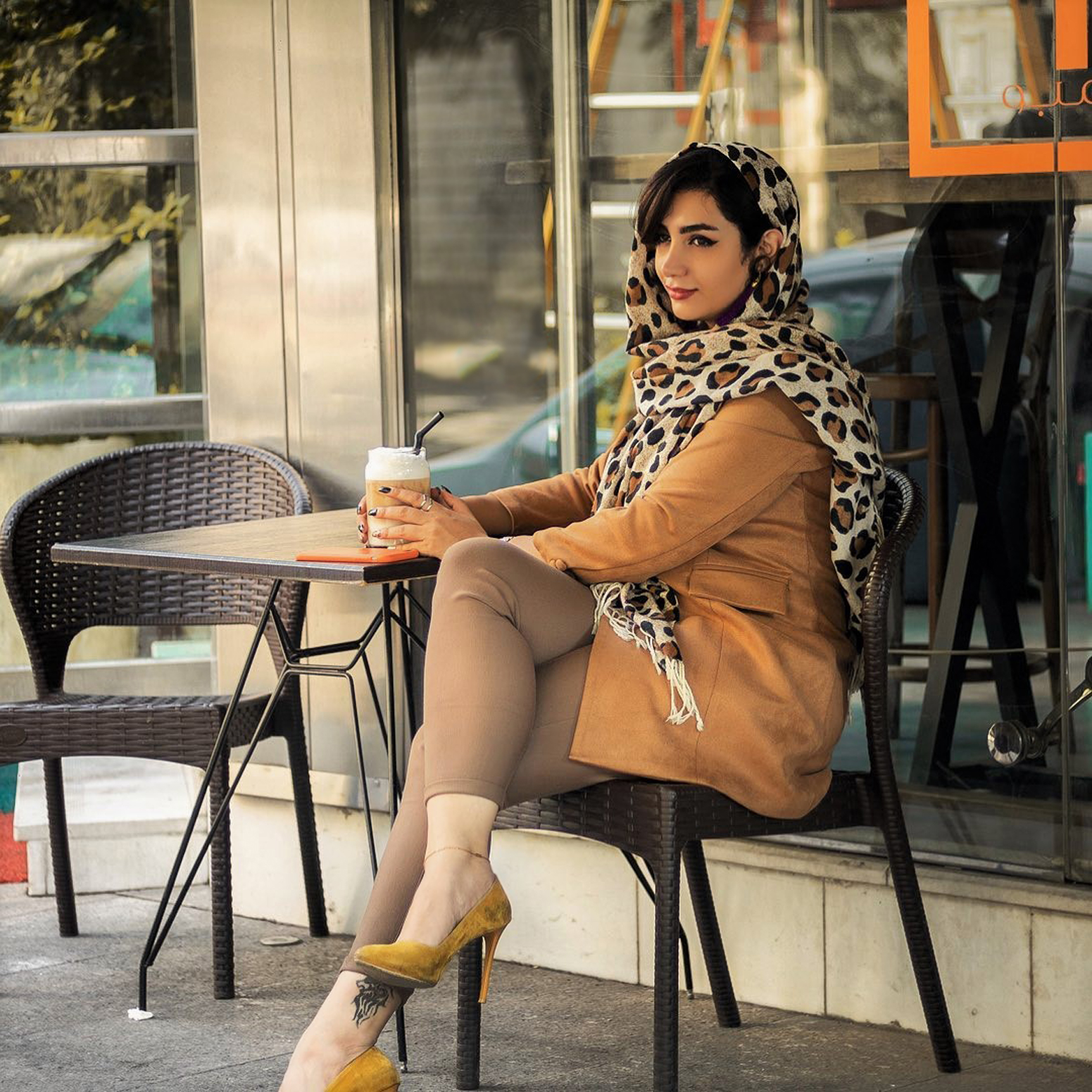
An Iranian woman in 2019

== Persian boots ==
Ancient Persians used to wear leather high-heeled boots. Both Persian women and men wore varieties of "tall" boots. In modern era, boot became a main and common footwear among Iranian women, and this influenced the Iranian fashion industry. The sale of women's boots in Iran was reported ten times more than men's boots in a report in the 2000s.

One of the early features of Iranian women's fashion was wearing high-heeled boots. Although later hijab was considered to be a main feature.

== Fashion exhibitions ==
- Iran Mode exhibition (apparel): The first exhibition took place in 2008, marking the beginning of a yearly fashion trade fair in Tehran. The exhibition features around 60 domestic companies showcasing collections inspired by Iranian Islamic culture, in addition to international textile and fashion companies. The exhibition attracts dozens of brands from sectors including women’s, men’s, children’s apparel, accessories, and fabrics.
- Iran MPEX exhibition (footwear, leather, bags).

== Agencies and models ==
There is a range of fashion models from Iran (or of Iranian descent) that have made it to a high-level fame, such as Nazanin Afshin-Jam, Farzan Athari, Sahar Biniaz, Mandana Karimi, Aylar Lie, Leyla Milani, Shermine Shahrivar and Sadaf Taherian.

== Social media ==
Social media networks have played a significant role in increasing the income from modeling in Iran. The influence of Instagram in the expansion of fashion photography in Iran has been mentioned by the Iranian media.

== List of Iranian fashion designers ==
- Farnaz Abdoli
- Ray Aghayan
- Haman Alimardani
- Mike Amiri
- Bijan
- Cleopatra Broumand
- Melody Ehsani
- Paria Farzaneh
- Mimi Fayazi
- Shirin Guild
- Mehr Monir Jahanbani
- Keyvan Khosrovani
- Arefeh Mansouri
- Manny Mashouf
- Saul Maslavi
- Hushidar Mortezaie
- Tala Raassi
- Behnaz Sarafpour
- Maral Yazarloo
- Mahla Zamani

== See also ==
- History of fashion design
- Chadors
- Headscarves
