= Jahanbani =

Jahanbani (Persian: جهانبانی) is an Iranian surname. Notable people with the surname include:

- Amanullah Jahanbani (1895–1974), Iranian general
- Khosrow Jahanbani (1941–2014), son of Amanullah
- Nader Jahanbani (1928–1979), Iranian general and fighter pilot, son of Amanullah
- Mehr Monir Jahanbani (1926–2018), Iranian textile designer, and fashion designer, daughter of Amanullah
- Showkat Malek Jahanbani (1908–1995), Iranian educator and politician
