= Mimi Fayazi =

American fashion designer

Mimi Fayazi (born August 10, 1947) is an American fashion designer who was particularly successful in the 1970s. Mimi was born in Iran and came to New York in 1967 to study fashion at the Mayer School of Fashion Design. Fayazi began designing in New York, and then started Mimi Fayazi Designs in 1974 in Los Angeles, with the Fayazi Couture, Miss Fayazi Dresses, and Mimi Fayazi Sportswear labels. Her style was distinctly feminine, while also drawing on the classic influences of the 1930s and 1940s. Besides being known for her design and fabrication, her clothing was also intended to transition easily from day time to evening wear. Her clothing, considered creative and sophisticated, sold in specialty and department stores, including Saks, Lord & Taylor, and Bergdorf Goodman, and were worn by many actresses, including Ali MacGraw and Candice Bergen. In 1978, Fayazi won 2 Tommy Awards from the American Printed Fabrics Council, Inc. for her designs.
