= Ferriby House =

House in North Ferriby, East Riding of Yorkshire, England

Coordinates: 53°43′21″N 0°30′16″W

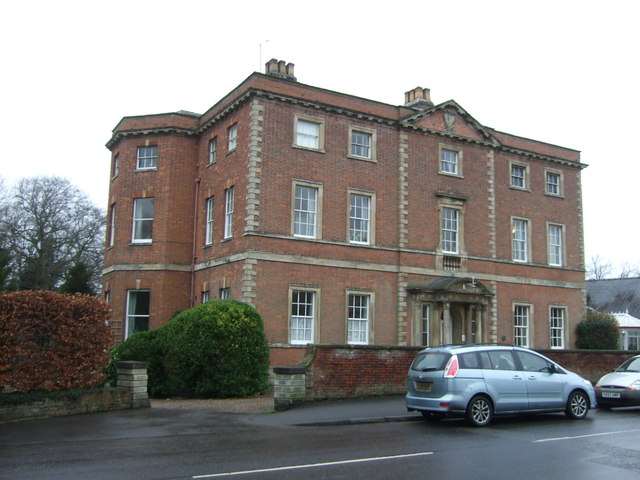
The building, in 2018

Ferriby House is a historic building in North Ferriby, a village in the East Riding of Yorkshire, in England.

The house was built in the 1760s for Henry Etherington. A stable block was added in 1788. The house was grade II* listed in 1952, while the stables were grade II listed. In 1983, the house was converted into the North Ferriby Nursing Home.

The house is built of red brick on a moulded plinth, with stone dressings, rusticated quoins, a floor band and a sill band, moulded eaves and raked cornices, a coped parapet, and a slate roof. There are three storeys and five bays, the middle bay projecting under a pediment containing a decorated blank shield. In the centre is a tripartite Corinthian portal with pilasters, the middle projecting on Corinthian columns under a frieze with an urn and festoons, a dentilled cornice, and a dentilled segmental pediment. The windows are sashes, the window above the portico with a decorated surround over a balustraded panel, and the other windows have eared architraves. The garden front has seven bays, the middle three bays canted. Inside, there is a grand two-storey entrance and staircase hall, and original panelling, stuccoed ceilings and polychrome marble fireplaces survive throughout.

The stable block is built of red brick on a shallow plinth, with stone dressings, a floor band, moulded eaves, a raking cornice, and a hipped stone slate roof. There are two storeys and eleven bays, the middle bay projecting under a pediment containing an oculus with keystones. On the ground floor are three doorways and sash windows, all with an impost band, round gauged brick arches and raised keystones. In the centre of the upper floor is a fixed window with radial glazing under an elliptical gauged brick arch with impost blocks and raised keystone, flanked by five elliptical windows with radial glazing. On the roof is a cupola with a weathervane.

== See also ==
- Grade II* listed buildings in the East Riding of Yorkshire
- Listed buildings in North Ferriby
