= North Ferriby =

Coordinates: 53°43′12″N 0°30′28″W

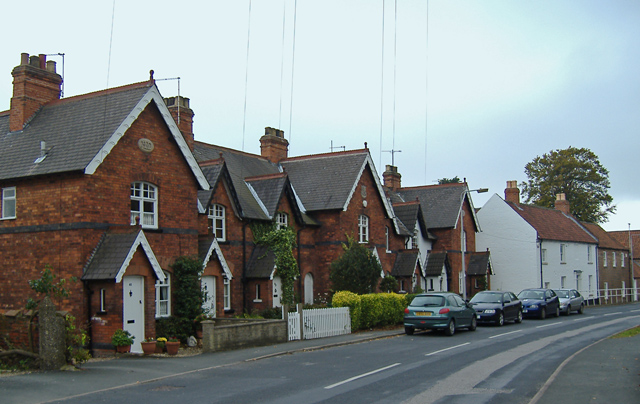
- High Street

- Location within the East Riding of Yorkshire
- Population: 3,893 (2011 census)
- OS grid reference: SE985258
  - London: 150 mi (240 km) S
- Civil parish: North Ferriby
- Unitary authority: East Riding of Yorkshire
- Ceremonial county: East Riding of Yorkshire
- Region: Yorkshire and the Humber
- Country: England
- Sovereign state: United Kingdom
- Post town: NORTH FERRIBY
- Postcode district: HU14
- Dialling code: 01482
- Police: Humberside
- Fire: Humberside
- Ambulance: Yorkshire
- UK Parliament: Goole and Pocklington

North Ferriby is a village and civil parish in the Haltemprice area of the East Riding of Yorkshire, England.

== History ==
=== Humber Estuary ===
"The archaeology of the intertidal wetlands of the Humber Estuary is of international importance, and includes prehistoric boats, trackways, fishtraps and platforms, Roman settlements and ports and Post-Medieval fishweirs."

The foreshore of North Ferriby, within the Humber Estuary, is the site of the earliest sewn plank boats known outside Egypt. In 1931, wooden planks belonging to an ancient boat were discovered by local man Ted Wright on the shore of the Humber. Two further boats have since been discovered. Estimates using radiocarbon dating have placed the origin of the boats to the Bronze Age, between 2030 and 1680 BC. The Ferriby Boats are the earliest known boats found in Europe. In addition, Bronze Age round barrows were found near North Ferriby by archaeologists excavating the land on which the A63 junction was built. There was also evidence of Iron Age and early Romano-British activity in that area.

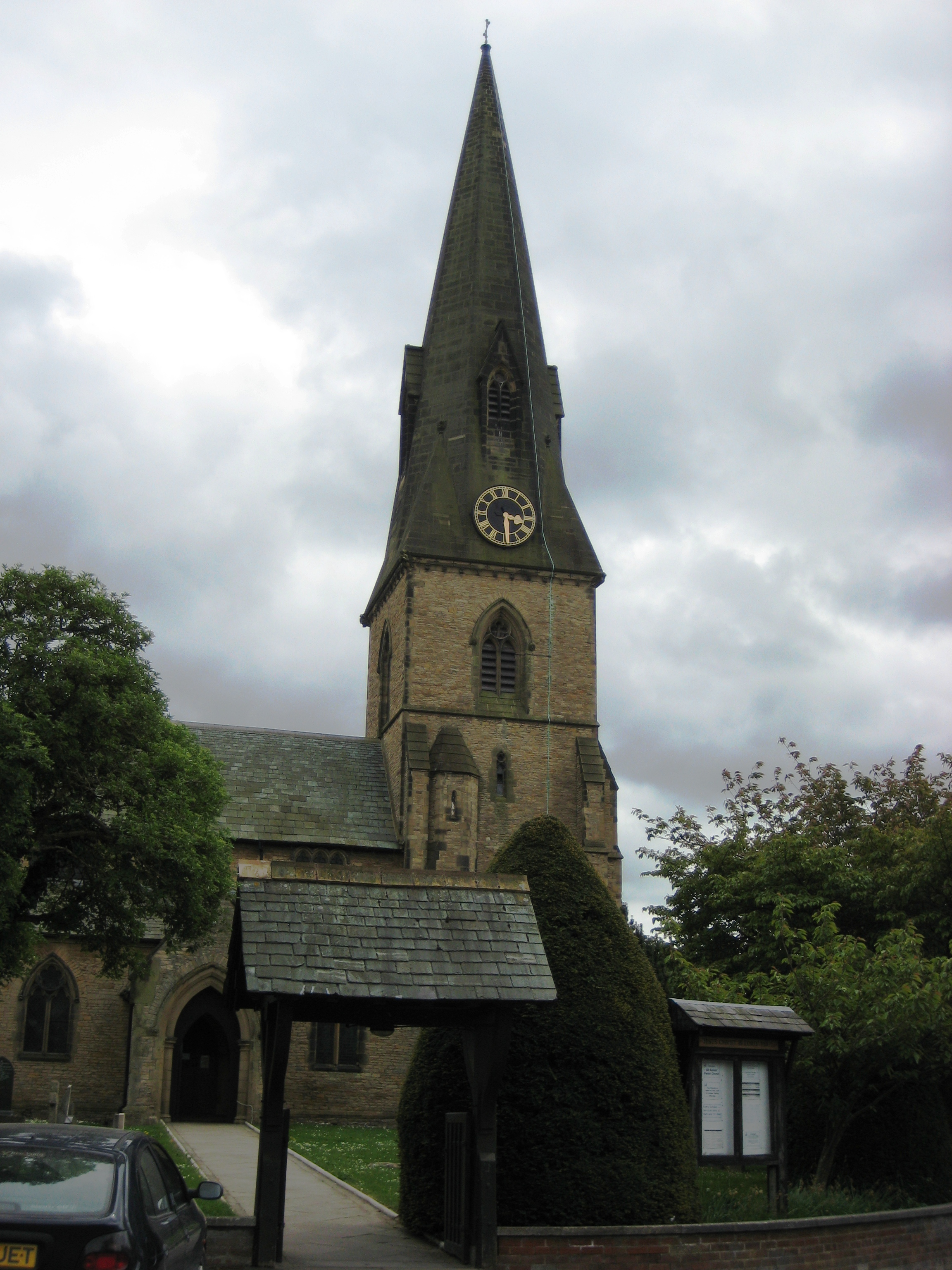
All Saints' Church

The first wave of Danes arrived in the area around 900 AD with each ship setting up a local village. Amongst these was what is now North Ferriby from the Danish Ferja bi (place by a ferry), which would have been the chief Danish settlement of the area and linked by ferry to South Ferriby. A wooden church was built at that time, replaced by its first stone church c. 1150.

=== Ferriby Priory ===
The village was once significant for Ferriby Priory, c. 1160, of the order of knights templar, founded by Lord Eustace Broomfleet de Vesci, in the reign of King John, anno 1200, as appears from an ancient manuscript formerly in the possession of the late Luke Lillingston, Esq. of North Ferriby, the Owner of the priory. It was dissolved along with the lesser monasteries, in 1536. The site of this priory is said to have been in the possession of 100 different persons "in the space of no more than 130 years after its dissolution".

The village has, in succession, been the patrimonial possession of the Mortimers, the Poles and the Bacons. It retains the elements of several elegant mansions from c. 1750 as Hull merchants started to build large houses (such as Ferriby House) with cottages for workers.

== Geography ==
North Ferriby is on the north bank of the Humber Estuary, approximately 8 miles (13 km) west of Hull city centre. To the north, atop a hill, lies Swanland via the B1231. South Ferriby is directly opposite the village, on the south bank of the Humber. North Ferriby is generally referred to as "Ferriby" by locals on the north bank, except where confusion might arise. Melton is close by to the west which is where the large South Hunsley School is located.

North Ferriby lies in the Parliamentary constituency of Goole and Pocklington.

== Community ==
Ferriby parish had an estimated population of 4,099 in 2024, an increase on the 2001 UK census figure of 3,819. The school has approximately 300 pupils.

In the village is the Duke of Cumberland public house, a British Legion club, an Indian restaurant, a pizza takeaway, a newsagent, Boots chemist, bike shop, a squash club with three courts, village hall, parish hall, barbers and beauty salon. North Ferriby's main shop is a Co-operative Group convenience store.

North Ferriby was home to local artist Tom Harland.

The village Riding for Disabled Association (RDA) is run throughout the year with the help of volunteers.

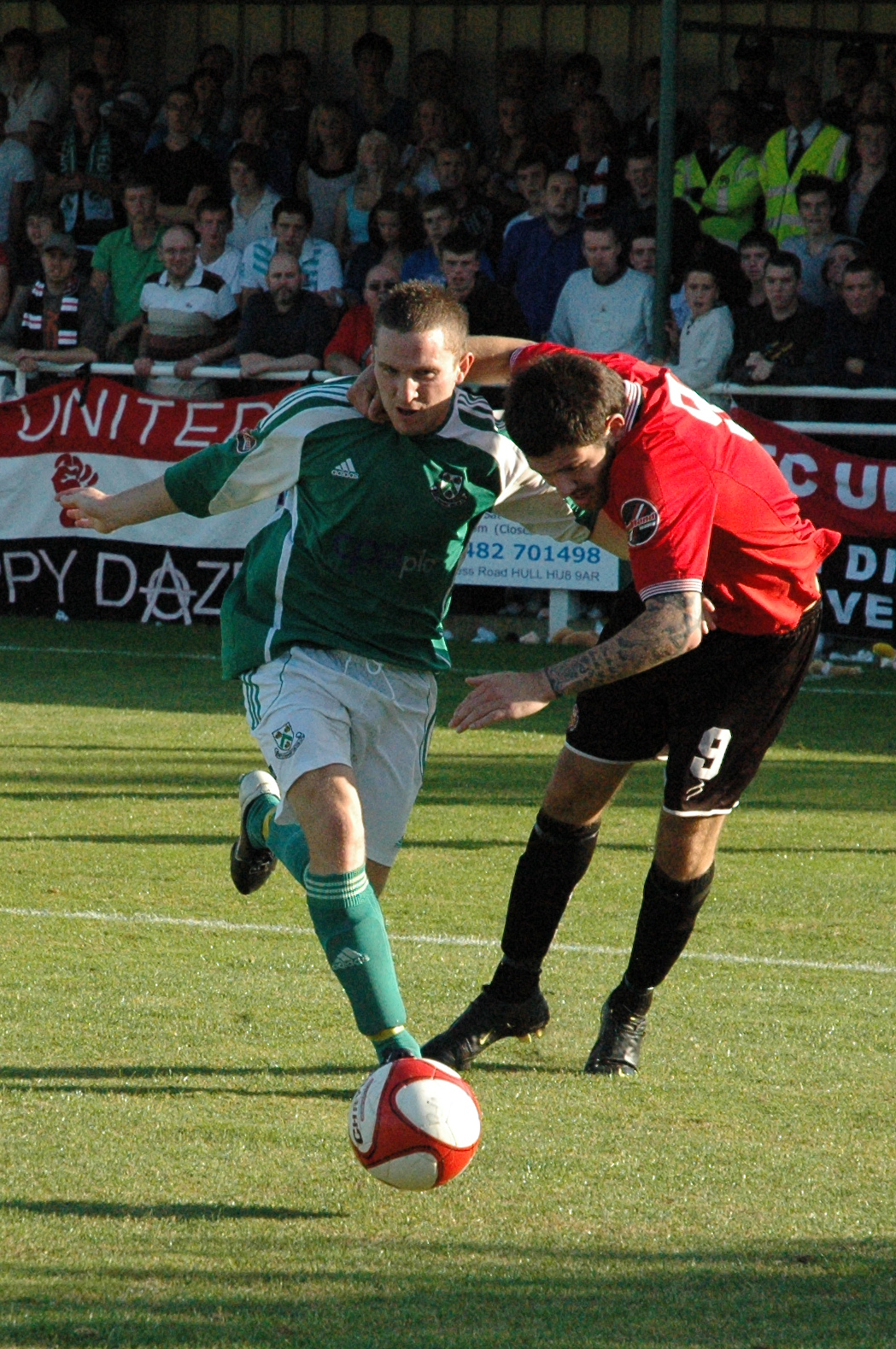
North Ferriby United v FC United

The local football club, North Ferriby United A.F.C., played in the National League North. They won the 2014–15 FA Trophy after beating Conference Premier side Wrexham at Wembley Stadium on 29 March 2015. However the club was wound up by the High Court on 15 March 2019 due to outstanding debts of almost £10,000. A new phoenix club, North Ferriby F.C., was formed and play in the Northern Counties East League Premier Division. The club is the second largest in the East Riding of Yorkshire after Hull City.

There are also the Anne Turner allotments and playing fields, home of North Ferriby Cricket Club. There are also three tennis courts and a skate park.

A public footpath that forms part of the Trans Pennine Trail and the Yorkshire Wolds Way, runs from Ferriby to Hessle alongside the Humber estuary, with views of the Humber Bridge. On this path is the site where the Ferriby boats were found.

The village no longer has a police station; the nearest police station is in Brough.

With the backing of the Parish Council, the Twinning Association was formed in the spring of 2003 and links North Ferriby with Le Pellerin, a French village to the south of Brittany, on the estuary of France's longest river, the Loire.

The village church has a distinctive spire, designed by John Loughborough Pearson, R.A. (1817–97), and was completed in 1848. The Anglican All Saints' Church, North Ferriby was designated a Grade II listed building in 1968 and is now recorded in the National Heritage List for England, maintained by Historic England. The current vicar is Reverend Matthew Brailsford. The parish used to have extensive holdings, including St Mary Lowgate in Hull.

== Transport ==
The village is served by the main A63 road, being bypassed in 1961, which links to the M62 motorway to the west and Hull to the east. The former A63 is now the B1231. Access to the village is from the new grade separated junction that was fully completed in early 2007.

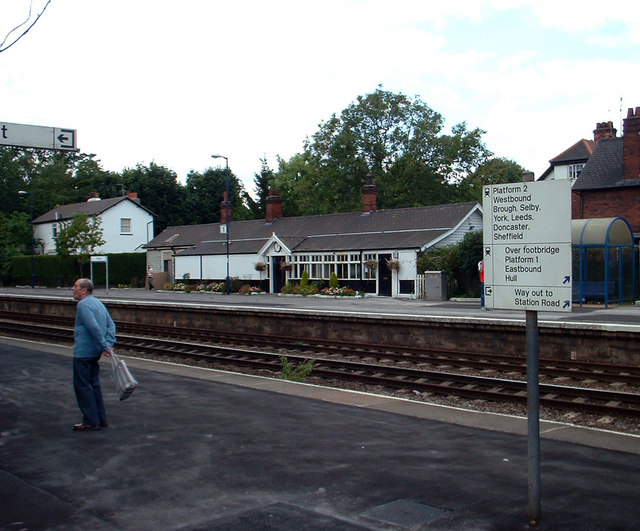
North Ferriby Station

The village is served by Ferriby railway station which is on the Selby Line. To get to places further away users must change at another railway station, the most commonly used is Brough to the west.

The Yorkshire Wolds Way National Trail and the Trans Pennine Trail long distance footpaths pass through the village.

== Notable people ==
- Calum Scott – Singer, songwriter and finalist of Britain's Got Talent
- Phil Brown – football manager
- Alex Deakin – weather forecaster
- Zara Holland, Miss Great Britain and reality TV contestant
- Xander Parish – dancer, formerly with the Royal Ballet and the Mariinsky Ballet
- Andy Pemberton – X Factor contestant
- William Wilberforce – anti-slavery campaigner
- George Witty – New Zealand MP
- Gerard Usflete (died 1406)
- Paria Farzaneh – fashion designer

== See also ==
- Listed buildings in North Ferriby

== Other sources ==
- Gazetteer — A–Z of Towns Villages and Hamlets. East Riding of Yorkshire Council. 2006. p. 8.
