= Listed buildings in North Ferriby =

North Ferriby is a civil parish in the county of the East Riding of Yorkshire, England. It contains 13 listed buildings that are recorded in the National Heritage List for England. Of these, one is listed at Grade II*, the middle of the three grades, and the others are at Grade II, the lowest grade. The parish contains the village of North Ferriby and the surrounding area. It is mainly residential, and most of the listed buildings consist of houses, cottages and associated structures. The other listed buildings include a church, a cross base in the churchyard, a garden niche, a war memorial and a telephone kiosk.

== Key ==
| Grade | Criteria |
|---|---|
| II* | Particularly important buildings of more than special interest |
| II | Buildings of national importance and special interest |

== Buildings ==
| Name and location | Photograph | Date | Notes | Grade |
|---|---|---|---|---|
| Cross base 53.71913°N 0.50243°W | — | Medieval | The cross base is in the churchyard of All Saints' Church, to the east of the church. It is in limestone, and consists of a cubital block with a deep chamfer to the upper arris, and a square socket for a shaft. | II |
| 15 High Street; 53.72275°N 0.50699°W | | 1758 | The house is in colourwashed roughcast brick on a plinth, with rusticated quoins, bracketed and sprocketed eaves, and a pantile roof with a raised gable on the right. There are two stages and three bays. The doorway and the casement window to the right have rusticated surrounds. To the left of thee doorway is a shop window, and further to the left is a sash window with a rusticated surround. Above the doorway is a blank opening, it is flanked by horizontally sliding sashes, and all have rusticated surrounds. | II |
| Ferriby House; 53.72249°N 0.50458°W | | c. 1760 | The house is in red brick on a moulded plinth, with stone dressings, rusticated quoins, a floor band and a sill band, moulded eaves and raked cornices, a coped parapet, and a slate roof. There are three storeys and five bays, the middle bay projecting under a pediment containing a decorated blank shield. In the centre is a tripartite Corinthian portal with pilasters, the middle projecting on Corinthian columns under a frieze with an urn and festoons, a dentilled cornice, and a dentilled segmental pediment. The windows are sashes, the window above the portico with a decorated surround over a balustraded panel, and the other windows have eared architraves. The garden front has seven bays, the middle three bays canted. | II* |
| White House and barn 53.72250°N 0.50980°W | — | Mid to late 18th century | The house and barn are in red brick with pantile roofs. The house is colourwashed, and its roof has a raised gable on the right. There are two storeys and three bays, and a two-storey single-bay extension to the left. The doorway has pilasters and a fanlight, and the windows are sashes, most with cambered wedge lintels. The barn to the right has two storeys and two bays, and contains small square vents on the lower floor, and two-light louvred openings above. | II |
| Garden niche, 8 Woodlands Rise; 53.72533°N 0.50485°W | — | Late 18th century (probable) | The niche in the garden is in limestone. It consists of a freestanding semi-domed recess in rusticated grotto style. | II |
| Tithe Farmhouse; 53.72260°N 0.50158°W | — | Late 18th century | The house, which has been extended to the rear, is in red brick, with stone dressings, a floor band, a bracketed eaves cornice, and a hipped slate roof. There are two storeys and five bays, the end and centre bays projecting under shallow coped pediments. The doorway is in the centre, and the windows are sashes under wedge lintels. | II |
| Moss Cottage and Honeysuckle Cottage; 53.72022°N 0.50690°W | | 1787 | A pair of cottages in colourwashed brick with a roof in pantile and slate. There is one storey and attics, and four bays. On the front and on the right return are gabled porches. The windows are sashes; over each is Gothic tracery in a pointed brick arch. To the right of the front porch is an initialled datestone. | II |
| Stables, Ferriby House; 53.72236°N 0.50491°W | — | 1788 | The stable block, later used for other purposes, is in red brick on a shallow plinth, with stone dressings, a floor band, moulded eaves, a raking cornice, and a hipped stone slate roof. There are two storeys and eleven bays, the middle bay projecting under a pediment containing an oculus with keystones. On the ground floor are three doorways and sash windows, all with an impost band, round gauged brick arches and raised keystones. In the centre of the upper floor is a fixed window with radial glazing under an elliptical gauged brick arch with impost blocks and raised keystone, flanked by five elliptical windows with radial glazing. On the roof is a cupola with a weathervane. | II |
| The Manor House and wall 53.72312°N 0.50652°W | | c. 1800 | The house is in red brick, with stone dressings, a floor band, an eaves cornice and a blocking course, and a slate roof. There are three storeys and five bays, the middle bay projecting, and containing a Doric doorcase with a segmental pediment, and a doorway with a fanlight. This flanked by French windows under cambered channelled wedge lintels with projecting fluted keystones. The upper floors contain a mix of sash and casement windows under wedge lintels. To the left is a 20th-century conservatory, and to the right is a 19th-century extension with a central pediment, and corner pilasters with urns. | II |
| Ferriby Hall Club, walls and gate piers 53.72269°N 0.50292°W | | Early 19th century | A house, later extended and used for other purposes, in colourwashed rendered brick, with hipped slate roofs. The main range has three storeys and seven bays, and the extension to the right has two storeys and three bays. The doorway has pilasters and a pediment, and the windows are sashes. The screen walls are in coped brick, and contain rusticated stone gate piers with pyramidal caps. | II |
| All Saints' Church; 53.71915°N 0.50285°W | | 1846–48 | The church, designed by J. L. Pearson, replaced a medieval church on the same site. It is built in limestone, with freestone dressings and slate roofs. The church consists of a nave with a clerestory, north and south aisles, north and south porches, a chancel with a north vestry, and a west steeple. The steeple has a tower with three stages, a moulded plinth, angle buttresses, a lancet window, a string course, and two-light pointed bell openings with hood moulds. Above is a parapet with small blank quatrefoils and grotesques on the corners, and a broach spire with a clock face, two-light lucarnes under gablets with poppyhead finials, and at the top is a cross finial. The east window has five lights. | II |
| War memorial 53.72200°N 0.50220°W | | 1920 | The war memorial stands in a garden by a road junction. It is in Portland stone, and consists of a tall cross on a tapering plinth and a base of three steps. On the front is carved a reversed sword in relief. The plinth carries an inscription and the names of those lost in the two World Wars. | II |
| K8 Telephone kiosk 53.72272°N 0.50459°W | | From 1968 | The telephone kiosk in High Street is of the K8 type designed by Bruce Martin. It is in cast iron with an aluminium door, it has a square plan and is painted cream. There is a flat domed roof, under which are rectangular panels with rounded corners containing "TELEPHONE". | II |
