= All Saints' Church, North Ferriby =

Church in North Ferriby, East Riding of Yorkshire, England

Coordinates: 53°43′09″N 0°30′10″W

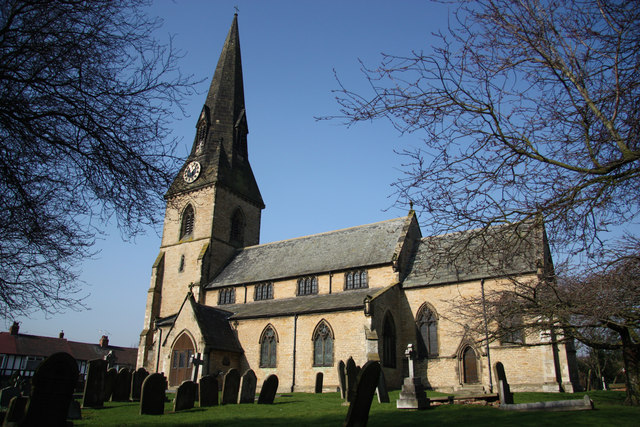
The church, in 2011

All Saints' Church is the parish church of North Ferriby, a village in the East Riding of Yorkshire, in England.

A church in North Ferriby was first recorded in the 13th century. In the 1840s, the building was described as apparently "part of a more spacious structure, [with] a low massive tower at the west end, and contain[ing] some ancient monuments". The building was restored in 1821, but between 1845 and 1848 it was demolished and rebuilt to a design by John Loughborough Pearson. It was grade II listed in 1968.

View from the nave into the chancel

The church is built of limestone, with freestone dressings and slate roofs. The church consists of a nave with a clerestory, north and south aisles, north and south porches, a chancel with a north vestry, and a west steeple. The steeple has a tower with three stages, a moulded plinth, angle buttresses, a lancet window, a string course, and two-light pointed bell openings with hood moulds. Above is a parapet with small blank quatrefoils and grotesques on the corners, and a broach spire with a clock face, two-light lucarnes under gablets with poppyhead finials, and at the top is a cross finial. The east window has five lights. Inside are several memorials brought from the old church, including two effigies kneeling in prayer. There is also an octagonal font.

== See also ==
- Listed buildings in North Ferriby
