= Mayer School of Fashion Design =

Former fashion school in New York City

Coordinates: 40°45′2″N 73°59′10″W

The Mayer School of Fashion Design (formerly the Chic School of Fashion) was a career college in New York City's Garment District, which offered short-term, 10-month programs in fashion illustration, pattern making, sewing, and draping. It was the only fashion college in the Garment District. The school was located at 64 West 36th Street in Manhattan, between Fifth and Sixth avenues. It was run by Herbert Mayer.
