= Farnaz Abdoli =

Iranian fashion designer (born 1987)

- Born: May 4, 1987 (age 39); Shiraz, Iran
- Occupation: Fashion designer - creative director - senior designer
- Known for: POOSH-e MA (2011–present)

Farnaz Abdoli is an Iranian fashion designer who founded her own women's wear brand, POOSH-e MA, in 2011.

Abdoli is known for bright colours and Western-influenced patterns and cuts while staying within the dress code of Iran's Islamic law. This has led to conflicts between the Iranian government and her brand.

== Early life and education ==
Abdoli grew up in Shiraz, Iran, with her family. Her future career grew from designing clothes for herself and her sister, which her mother would then sew. Abdoli is grateful to her mother for allowing her to be passionate about the fashion industry. Abdoli is fluent in both Persian and English.

Abdoli's education began at the Art College of Shiraz (2007 to 2009), where she received her associate degree in graphic design. She then attended Sariyan University in Sari, Iran. After 2 years of study (2009 to 2011), she received a bachelor's degree in graphic design.

She has described her love for fashion as originating when she was a young girl living in Iran; "As a young girl I wasn't able to find my desired streetwear". This was due to the effects of the Iranian Revolution, which had ushered in an Islamic government and introduced sanctions on women and subjected them to wearing Hijabs and other loose-fitting and modest clothing. This law was established by Mahmoud Ahmadinejad, who was the leader of the Basij Militia, which enforced this dress code across Iran, and women who resisted following the legally-required dress-code were arrested.

== POOSH-e MA ==
Since 2012, Abdoli's main focus has been on developing her own brand called POOSH-e MA. Originally called "Poosh" (meaning "cloth" in Persian), the brand was founded in 2011.

Abdoli and Vojoodi brought out their 2013 Spring/Summer collection, which brought the attention of news agencies such as newspapers in Iran, California and Germany, BBC World News, BBC Persian, Germany Radio and CNN. The media describes the brand as "innovative, bold and fresh whilst being respectful to women of Iran," and "colourful and modern".

== Conflict with Iranian government ==
Abdoli has faced scrutiny from Iranian authorities for allegedly promoting styles that deviated from the prescribed dress codes.

In 2013, her designs were criticized in Iranian media, with conservative outlets describing her collections as provocative. There was skepticism from Iranian women asking if her collection was appropriate to wear outside. Moreover, POOSH-e Ma's 2013 Spring/Summer collection experienced an adverse reaction from the media; the Bultan News website described Abdoli's collection as "the Spring prostitution campaign" and had accused her fashion brand of being illicit. The claim of POOSH-e Ma being 'too provocative' is because her models wear leggings rather than wide leg trousers, three-quarter sleeve tops rather than long sleeved tunics and tighter fitting clothes rather than loose clothing.

In 2015, Abdoli claimed Iran has changed for the better stating that "Now you can't count the number of people involved in fashion in Iran, with many companies holding training for modelling and designing and even offering certificates."

In 2016, Iranian police cracked down on unlicensed fashion activities, shutting down 800 shops and issued an additional 3,000 formal warnings, including to Abdoli. POOSH-e MA received backlash following this event from Iranian MP, Zohreh Tabibzadeh. She described Abdoli's collection (which contained the word 'Queen') as a "calculated plan to subvert traditional values" and also declared that Abdoli's collection was an "ugly manifestation of a Western trend that has entered our country with evil intentions devised behind the scenes." She did not shut down her brand and drew support from international fashion media and rights organizations.

=== Exile ===
In 2017, Abdoli was sentenced to prison in Iran in connection with her fashion activities. She subsequently left the country and did not serve the sentence. Following her departure, she went to Turkey before relocating to France. There she paticipated in residency programes including the Théâtre du Préau in Vire Normandie.

== International recognition ==
In interviews, Abdoli has expressed her belief that fashion serves as a powerful tool for women's empowerment and cultural change.
