= Leather industry in Iran =

The leather industry in Iran (Persian: صنعت چرم ایران) began at the start of the twentieth century. Despite the industry's long history and the livestock hide's genetic proficiency, Iranian products have not achieved a significant place in international leather markets.

== History ==
=== Early history ===
During the reign of Ahmad Shah Qajar, the last Qajar king, evidence has shown attempts to import leather processing machinery from the West, proving Iran's quest to build leather factories extended beyond the early 1900s. After the bombardment and closure of the First Parliament, Mohammad Ali Shah Qajar ordered the establishment of a new assembly within Iran. The members of this newfound assembly discussed an agreement to build up a modern leather factory. Prior to this agreement, Iran only enacted traditional tanneries (dabbaghi) for leather production.

=== Foreign involvement ===
During the first Pahlavi era, German companies started to invest in the Iranian leather industry. As a result, the Khosravi leather factory was built in Tabriz in 1931/32 (1310 Iranian calendar) with 533 workers, the largest and most modern of the time. After the Second World War, during the second Pahlavi era, this industry started to develop with factories mainly in the south of Tehran (Shahr-e-Rey) and Tabriz. These were chiefly private companies who were able to import Western machinery, mostly from Germany and Italy. The use of Western chemical products in the process of leather making also increased the quality of Iranian leather.

=== After the 1979 Islamic Revolution ===
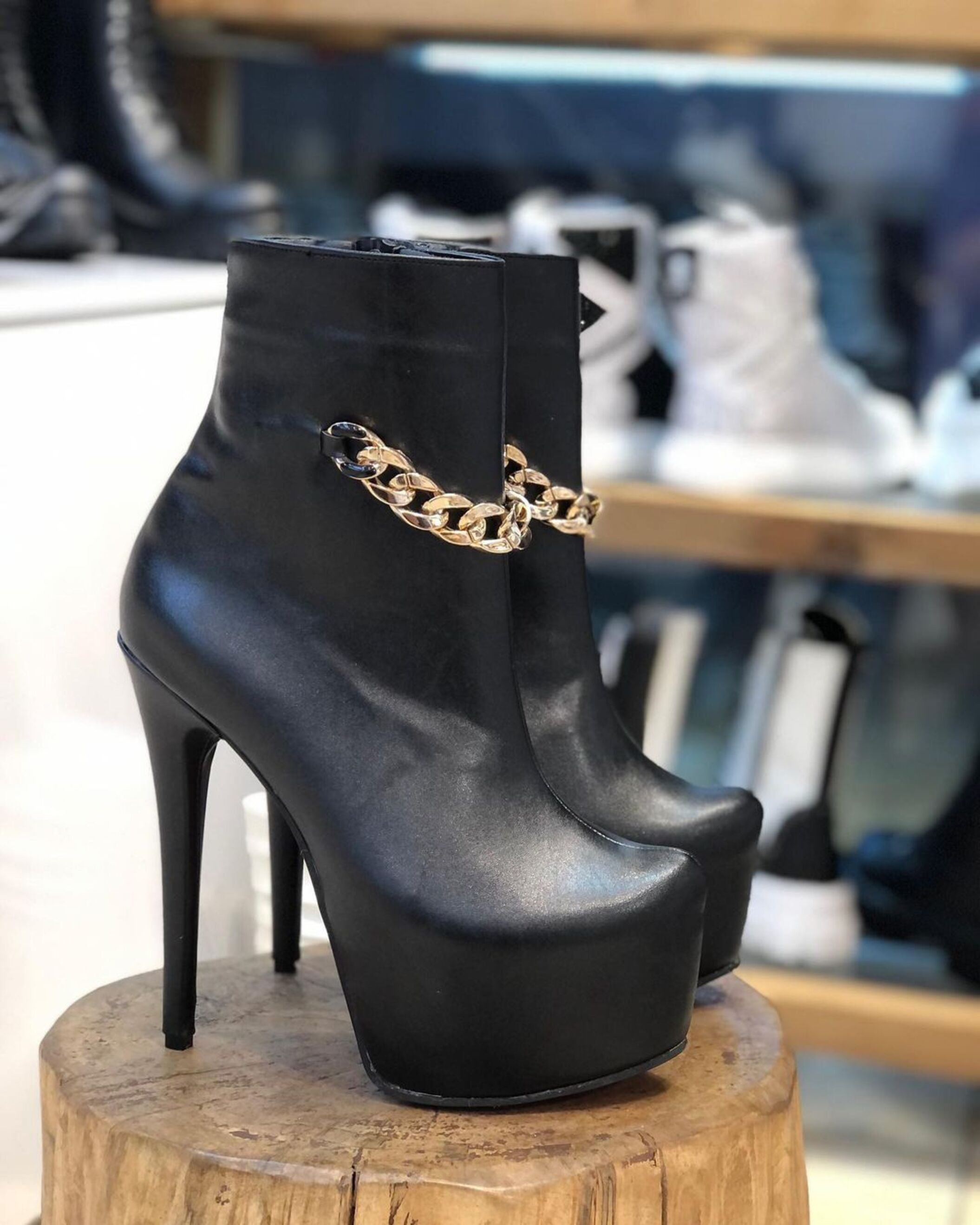
Iranian 2020 black leather boots

During the 1970s, the leather industry was one of the most lucrative businesses in Iran. Before the revolution, Iranians were able to build some of the machinery, such as gear boxes for the wooden drums used for washing the leather. After the 1979 Islamic revolution, sanctions against Iran affected the leather industry. As a result of these sanctions, some Iranian chemical companies began to produce chemical products for the industry and the manufacturers of leather processing machinery developed as well.

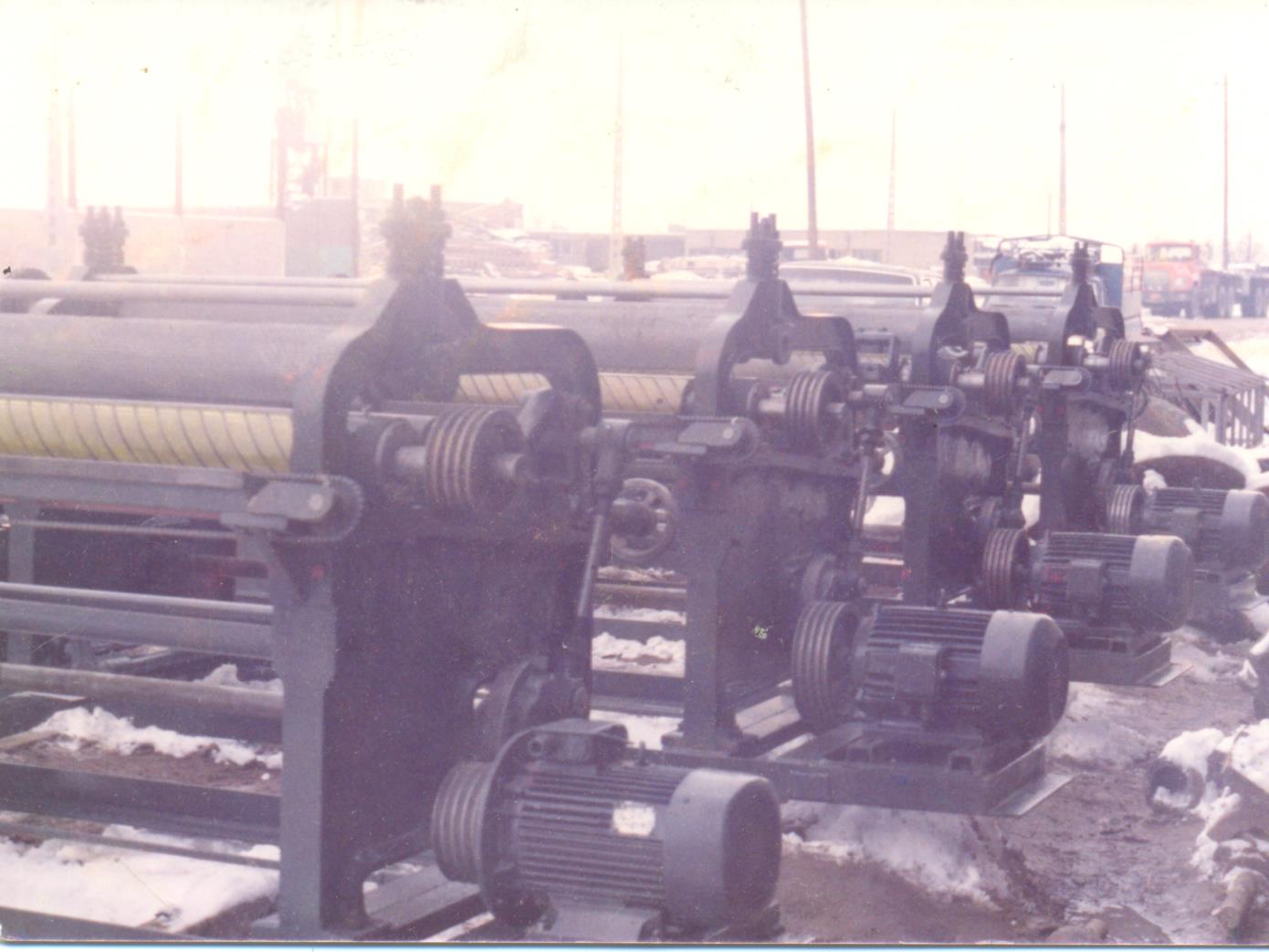
Fleshing Machines built in Tabriz,1980s

Since the 2000s, the production of women's leather boots in various designs has been able to give a new life to Iran's leather industry. Iranian thigh-high boots with black leather can be found all over the Middle East.

== Advancing technology ==
Afterwards, more complicated machinery, such as fleshing machines, were first built in Tabriz. The use of these machines continued until the production of more advanced mechanical and electrical machines. The leather industry in Tabriz started to use one of the most advanced machines built in Iran. Used for splitting it was produced by Reza Pourbagheri, of the Techno Machine Company, which was first located in Tehran. Later the company, Hydro Charm emerged and produced other leather processing machines.

The leather industry flourished after the revolution and was taking advantage of government subsidies until its support was restricted. This was due to the inferior quality of Iranian leather which caused difficulty in producers finding markets outside Iran to export along with the import of Chinese products. This forced some factories to close by the end of the twentieth century and many workers also lost their jobs A report revealed that "1500 workers have lost their jobs following the continuing shutdown of leather producing factories in the city of Mashhad. Presently, Iranian leather export primarily focuses on trade of raw hides and skins at low sale price. The Iranian government encourages the industry to process high added value products of leather goods, leather shoes and leather clothing so as to increase the industry's profits".

== Impact ==
The majority of leather companies are privately owned, but many of these factories operate at only 40% of their capacity despite significant investments in the country's leather industry. Despite the industry's long history and skin hide proficiency, Iranian products have not achieved a significant place in the international markets.
