= Tala Raassi =

Iranian-American fashion designer

Tala Raassi is an Iranian-American fashion designer born in Maryland, United States and raised in Tehran, Iran. When Tala Raassi turned sixteen, she attended her Sweet 16 at a friend's house wearing a mini skirt. It was not long before the party was raided by the religious police and she and her friends faced the punishment of five days in jail and forty lashes. In 2000, right after the punishment, Raassi moved back to the United States where she currently lives.

== Career ==
After moving to the States and studying fashion marketing, Raassi opened a high-end boutique in Washington DC where she oversaw all aspects of business from construction, buying, and merchandizing to finance and payroll. While shopping for her boutique in São Paulo, Brazil during fashion week, Raassi became inspired to design her own line of swimsuits, Dar Be Dar. Raassi later left the store and started traveling the world to find the best fabrics, manufacturers, and suppliers, ultimately selecting Medellin, Colombia for production.

Since its inception, Raassi's line, Dar Be Dar, has sponsored the Washington Wizards Dance Team and was the official swimwear sponsor for the Miss Universe 2010 pageant. Dar Be Dar means door to door in Raassi's native language, Persian. In slang it means someone who is all over the place. “It represents me as a designer, because I had to go door to door to figure out the process of starting a fashion business.”

In 2012, Raassi was called “One of the Most Fearless Women in the World” by Newsweek Magazine.

Tala Raassi has stated that she "aims to celebrate the beauty of the woman’s body through her designs and empower women all around the world to follow their dreams." For Tala Raassi, “fashion is freedom.”.

== Appearances ==
Tala Raassi was on the program to appear in 3 events at the 2017 Brisbane Writers Festival in Brisbane, Queensland, Australia.
