= Keyvan Khosrovani =

Iranian architect and fashion designer (1938–2026)

- کیوان خُسرُوانی
- Born: Keyvan Khosrovani; 29 July 1938; Tehran, Iran
- Died: 3 September 2026 (aged 88); Paris, France
- Other name: Kivan Khosravani
- Education: University of California, Berkeley, University of Tehran (MA), Beaux-Arts de Paris
- Occupations: Architect, fashion designer, lighting designer
- Notable work: Inn of Nain; Villa Farmanieh; Kanoon Library, Royal Haute Couture Collection; Preservation of Oudlajan
- Website: www.keyvankhosrovani.com

Keyvan Khosrovani (Persian: کیوان خُسرُوانی, 29 July 1938 – 3 September 2026) was an Iranian architect, queer activist, lighting designer and fashion designer. He was born in Tehran, and resided in Paris from 1978 to his death in 2026. He served as the fashion designer for Shahbanu Farah Pahlavi in the 1970s.

== Early life and education ==
Keyvan Khosrovani was born on 29 July 1938, in Tehran, Imperial State of Iran (now Iran). He was gay. His father was Lt. Gen. Morteza Khosrovani, the head of the judicial department of the Imperial Iranian Army. His paternal uncles included Lt. Gen. Parviz Khosrovani, the commander of the Gendarmerie in Iran; Attaollah Khosrovani, who was first in charge of the Ministry of Labor and then the Ministry of Interior and Khosrow Khosrovani, Iran's ambassador to the United States.

He began his architectural studies in 1957, at the University of California, Berkeley in the United States. After a year, he returned to Iran. In 1962, he completed his master's degree in architecture from the University of Tehran, under the direction of Houshang Seyhoun. He studied fine art for two years at the École Nationale Supérieure des Beaux-Arts in Paris, under a French government scholarship.

== Career ==
In 1965, he collaborated with British architects Jane Drew and Maxwell Fry on the University of Sheffield project. Then, in 1966, he completed a one-year specialization course in the conservation and restoration of historical monuments, offered by UNESCO, at the University of Architecture in Rome.

After returning to Iran in 1966, he participated in the first Shiraz - Persepolis Festival of Arts. He was the lighting designer for the illumination of Persepolis and Hafezieh and the designer of the amphitheaters for the festival. His deep respect for Iranian culture led him to promote Persian classical music for Iranian television, providing the channel with nine solo concert programs by Iranian artists as a volunteer producer.

Due to his interest in preserving traditional Iranian crafts, he spent several years working on the revitalization of traditional weaving in Iran; Isfahan silk, "Oskou" (the weaving technique), "Qalamkar" (fabric printing), "Cheshmé douzi" of Isfahan, and "Souzan douzi" (needlework embroidery) of Baluchistan, with the help of Iranian fashion designer, Mehr Monir Jahanbani.

Khosrovani worked as the fashion designer for Shahbanu Farah Pahlavi. For 13 years he worked pro-bono on designs for the empress, and he played an essential role in the revival of Iranian crafts and fabrics in the 1970s. At the same time, he opened his own fashion boutiques in Iran, "Number One" and "Miss Number One".

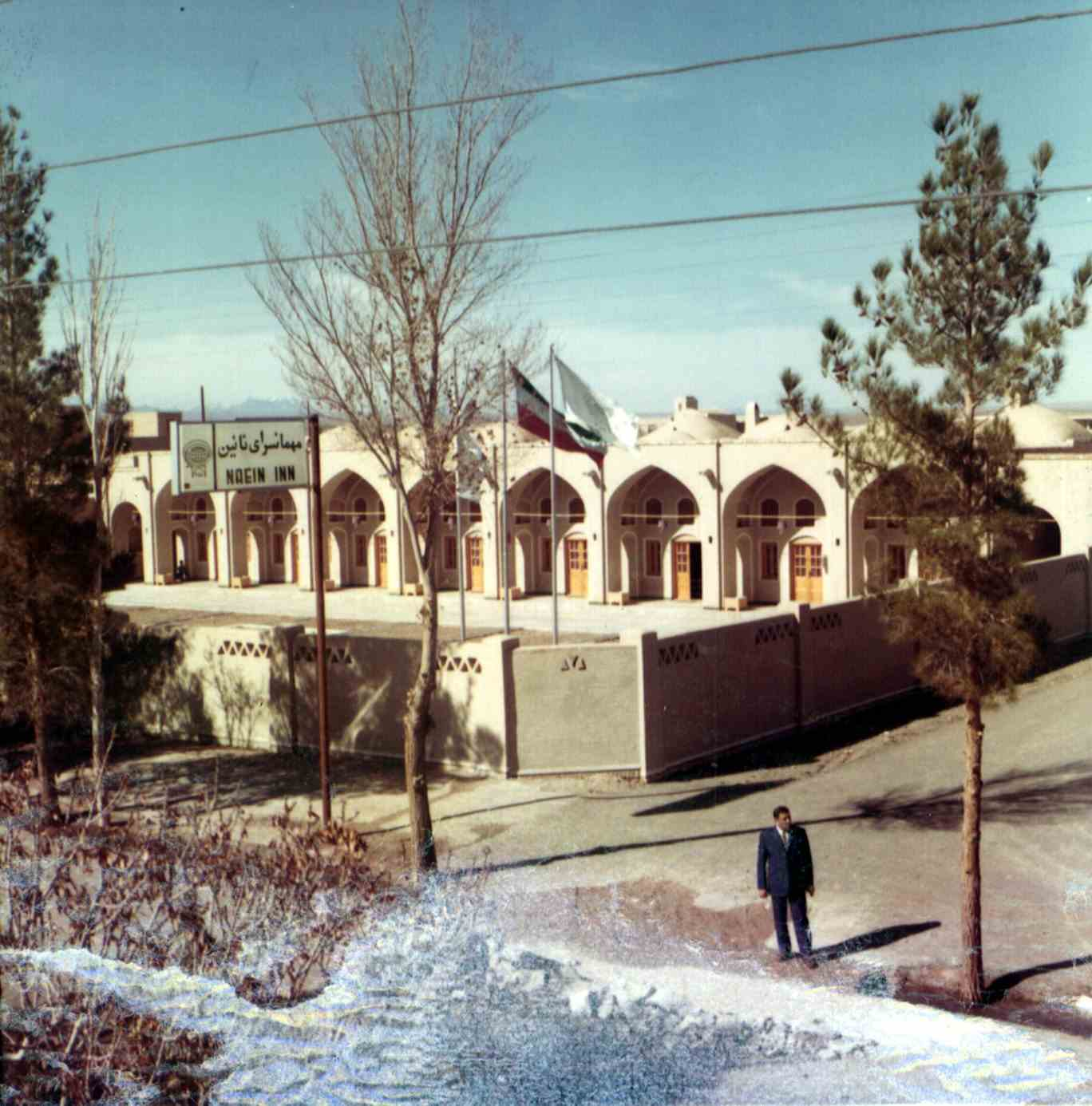
Guest house of Naein

The result of this particular attention was that, for 13 years, he was the creator pro bono, volunteer, and unpaid, of the official wardrobe of and the royal family, playing an essential role in the revival of Iranian crafts and fabrics. As Khosrovani himself stated in one of his interviews: "this achievement would not have been possible without the will of the Empress of Iran".

In 1999, four of his creations for the Empress of Iran were donated by him to the Palais Galliera, Musée de la Mode de la ville de Paris, as part of the museum's permanent collection.

However, throughout his professional career, he also worked on and played a role in several architectural projects. One of his architectural projects is the Naein Inn (Persian: مهمانسرای نائین, romanized: Mehmansaray-e-Naïn), which was built in 1967 in the city of Nain at the request of the Ministry of Tourism. In 1969, he also voluntarily designed and built a library for the Kanoun-e-Parvaresh Fekri Koudakan va Nojavanan [the Center for Intellectual Development of Children and Adolescents] in the Gowd-e-Zanbourk Khouneh neighborhood (a popular area in Tehran). In addition to these projects, he had designed a family villa in the Farmanieh neighborhood in Tehran for his own family, which was destroyed after the Islamic Revolution.

After moving to Paris in 1978, a year before the Islamic Revolution in Iran, Khosrovani continued his cultural activities to promote Iranian heritage. During his exile, he agreed to contribute voluntarily as an architect to the "Persian Shabestan" project in the Great Mosque of Paris (a historical monument from 1924), at the request of the Embassy of the Islamic Republic of Iran.

== Death ==
Khosrovani died by suicide in Paris on 3 September 2026, at the age of 88.

== List of architectural works ==
- Nain Inn (1967; Persian: مهمانسرای نائین, romanized: Mehmansaray-e-Naïn), Nain, Nain County, Isfahan Province, Iran
- Interior for the Consulate General of Iran in San Francisco (1968), 3400 Washington Street, San Francisco, California, United States
- Library for the Institute for the Intellectual Development of Children and Young Adults (1969; Persian: کانون پرورش فکری کودکان و نوجوانان, romanized: Kanoun-e-Parvaresh Fekri Koudakan va Nojavanan), Gowd-e-Zanbourk Khouneh neighborhood, Tehran, Iran
- Villa Farmanieh (demolished), Shemiran, Shemiranat County, Tehran Province, Iran
