= Sadaf Taherian =

Iranian actress and model

- صدف طاهریان
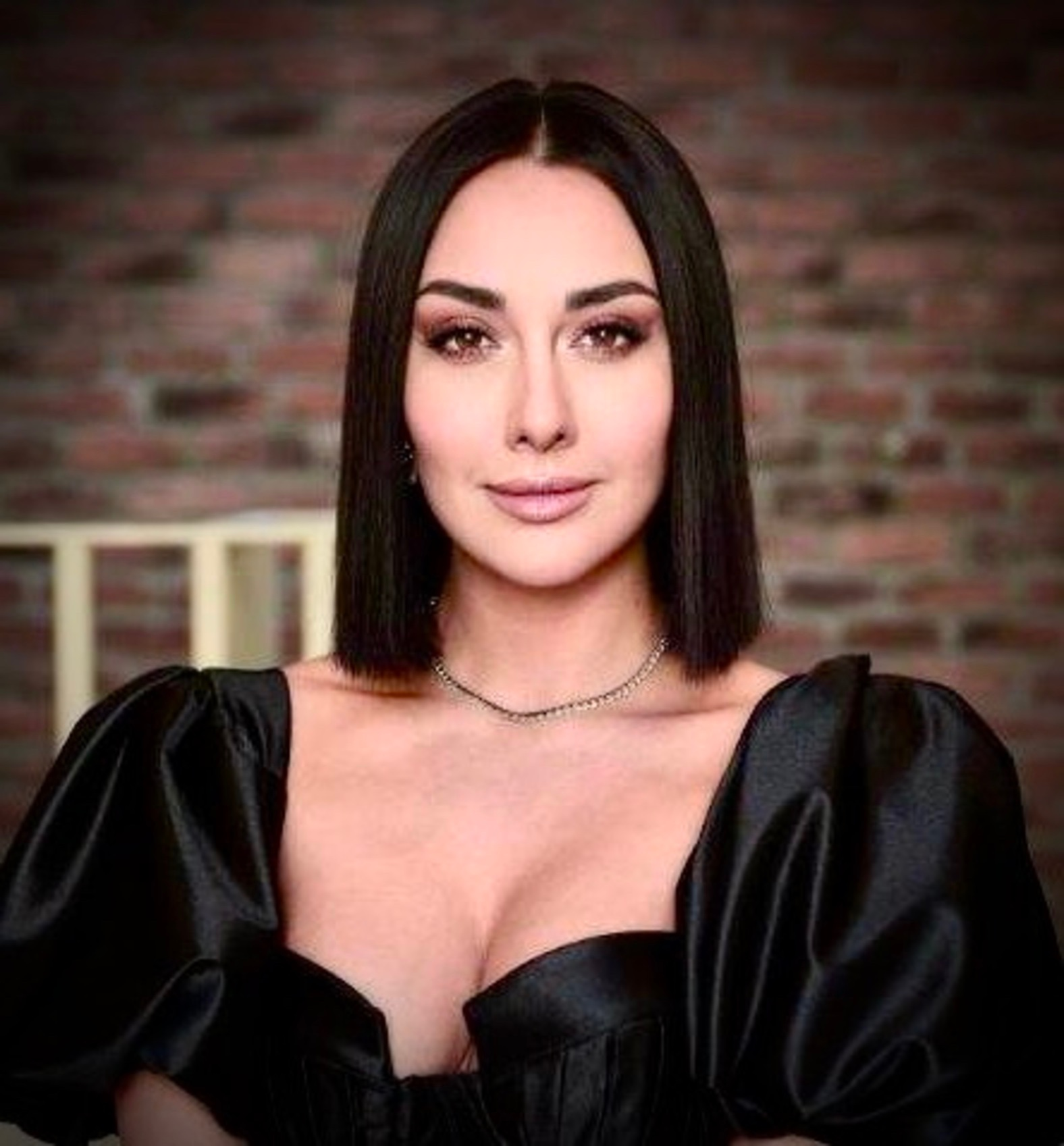
- Taherian in 2017
- Born: July 21, 1988 (age 37); Tehran, Iran
- Occupations: Former actress, model
- Years active: 2010–present

Sadaf Taherian (Persian: صدف طاهریان, romanized: Sadaf Taheriyan; born July 21, 1988) is an Iranian model and former actress. She has had appearances in Iranian movies and television. After leaving the country, Taherian posted unveiled images of herself on Facebook and Instagram that were denounced by Iran's ministry of culture and Islamic guidance.

Taherian started her modeling career after leaving Iran. She works with cosmetics, beauty and healthcare companies in countries including Turkey and the UAE. She is fluent in Persian, Turkish and English.

== Career ==
=== Acting career ===
Taherian began her professional acting career with a role in the film Nobody, Nowhere (2011) (fa). She followed it with roles in four television series, including Woodpecker (2011) and Like a Dream (2012).

==== Removing the Hijab ====
In October 2015, Taherian posted uncovered photos of herself on Instagram and Facebook in protest at being forced to wear a headscarf, and said she will speak out about the "dirty cinema of Iran". She has also posted videos on her Instagram account, saying that she had left the country for nearby Dubai and her account was not hacked.

Iran’s law has deemed the hijab mandatory for women since the establishment of the Islamic Republic in 1979. In reaction to Taherian's act, the ministry of culture and Islamic guidance denounced her ‘immoral’, banned her from acting, and photoshopped the traditional head scarf back into the shots.

=== Modeling career ===
She started her modeling career after leaving Iran. She worked with cosmetics, beauty and health care companies as model. In 2016, Watsons, known as the largest health care and beauty care chain store in Asia, worked with Taherian for beauty and health products. Her images are used in many beauty and fashion magazines, but not in her native country. She has also been involved in several fashion promotional videos.

== Personal life ==
After leaving Iran, Taherian began a relationship with Turkish actor Özgür Teke.

== Filmography ==
Cinema

- Hich Koja, Hich Kas (Nobody, Nowhere) (2011)
- Pas Kuche-haye Shemrun (Shemiran's Back alleys) (2012)
- Gharar-e Baadi, Hamān Ja (Next Date, Same Place) (2013)
- Asr-e Yakhbandan (Ice Age) (2015)

TV

- Telefon-e Hamrah (Cellular Phone) (2011)
- Darkub (Woodpecker) (2011)
- Mesl-e Yek Khab (Like a Dream) (2012)

Short

- Filmi Kutah Baray-e Hamsaram (Short Movie for my spouse) (2010)

== See also ==
- List of Iranian women models and beauty pageant titleholders
