= Mehr Monir Jahanbani =

Iranian fashion designer (1926–2018)

H.H. Mehr Monir Jahanbani
- مهرمنیر جهانبانی
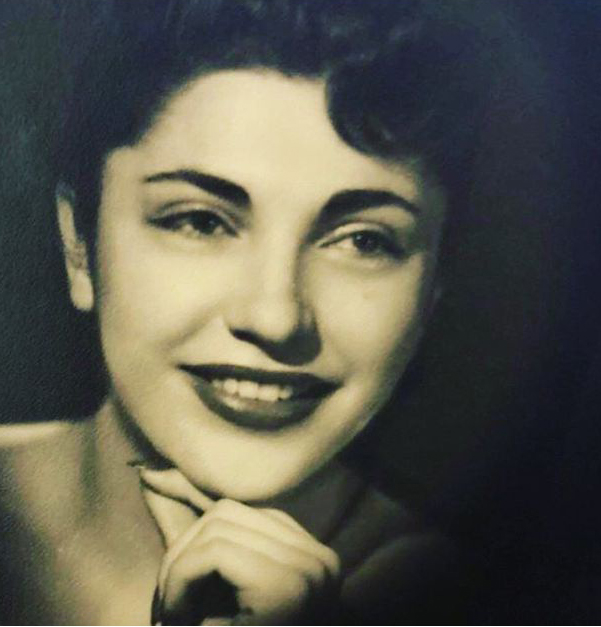
- Born: 17 April 1926; Tehran, Imperial State of Iran
- Died: 7 August 2018 (aged 92); Tehran, Iran
- Other names: Nini Jahanbani, Mehr-Monir Jahanbani, Mehrmonir Jahanbani, Mehr Monir Djahanbani
- Education: University of South Florida
- Known for: Textile design, fashion design, visual art
- Children: 2
- Father: Amanullah Jahanbani
- Relatives: Nader Jahanbani (brother); Khosrow Jahanbani (brother)

Mehr Monir Jahanbani (Persian: مهرمنیر جهانبانی; 16 April 1926 – 7 August 2018), also known as Mehr-Monir Jahanbani, Mehrmonir Djahanbani, and Nini Jahanbani, was an Iranian textile and fashion designer as well as visual artist. She played a significant role in supporting, promoting and modernizing the traditional Iranian embroidery and needlework, especially from the Baluchistan region. She had a boutique in Iran named "Nini".

== Biography ==
Mehr Monir Jahanbani was born on 16 April 1926, in Tehran, Imperial Iran, into a noble family. She was the daughter of General Amanullah Jahanbani and his Russian wife, Helen Kasminsky, who belonged to the aristocracy of Saint Petersburg. Her paternal grandfather was a descendant of Prince Seyfollah Mirza, a son of Fath-Ali Shah Qajar. Consequently, upon her birth, Mehr Monir was given the title "H.H. Shahzadeh Mihir Munir Khanum" (Persian: شاهزاده مهرمنیر خانم) in the Qajar dynasty's genealogy and was registered as Mehr Monir Jahanbani in official documents.

From a young age, Jahanbani was deeply influenced by the cultural and artistic heritage of her Russian grandmother, which sparked her passion for the art of embroidery and needlework. This interest became a defining aspect of her later life. At the age of 24, she moved to Paris to continue her education, and a year later, she relocated to the United States. In the U.S., she studied history at the University of South Florida, where she deepened her understanding of the importance of history and cultural heritage, which became her primary focus.

She was married twice and had two children.

=== Baluch art ===
After returning to Iran in 1961, Jahanbani became acquainted with the art of Balochi needlework and its motifs. This discovery led her to undertake numerous trips to Baluchistan, where she sought to deepen her understanding of the people, culture, and art of the Baluch.

In 1967, she organized an exhibition in Tehran to introduce the art and culture of the Baluch people. The exhibition featured Balochi needlework, Kalporegan pottery, Qasr-e Qand basketry, and other Baluch handicrafts, aimed at raising awareness among elites, particularly to encourage them to support this rich and untapped region. During this exhibition, she successfully persuaded Bank Saderat to support agriculture in Baluchistan. She also managed to secure numerous orders for Baluch embroiderers, thereby activating the economic cycle for Baluch women.

== Legacy ==
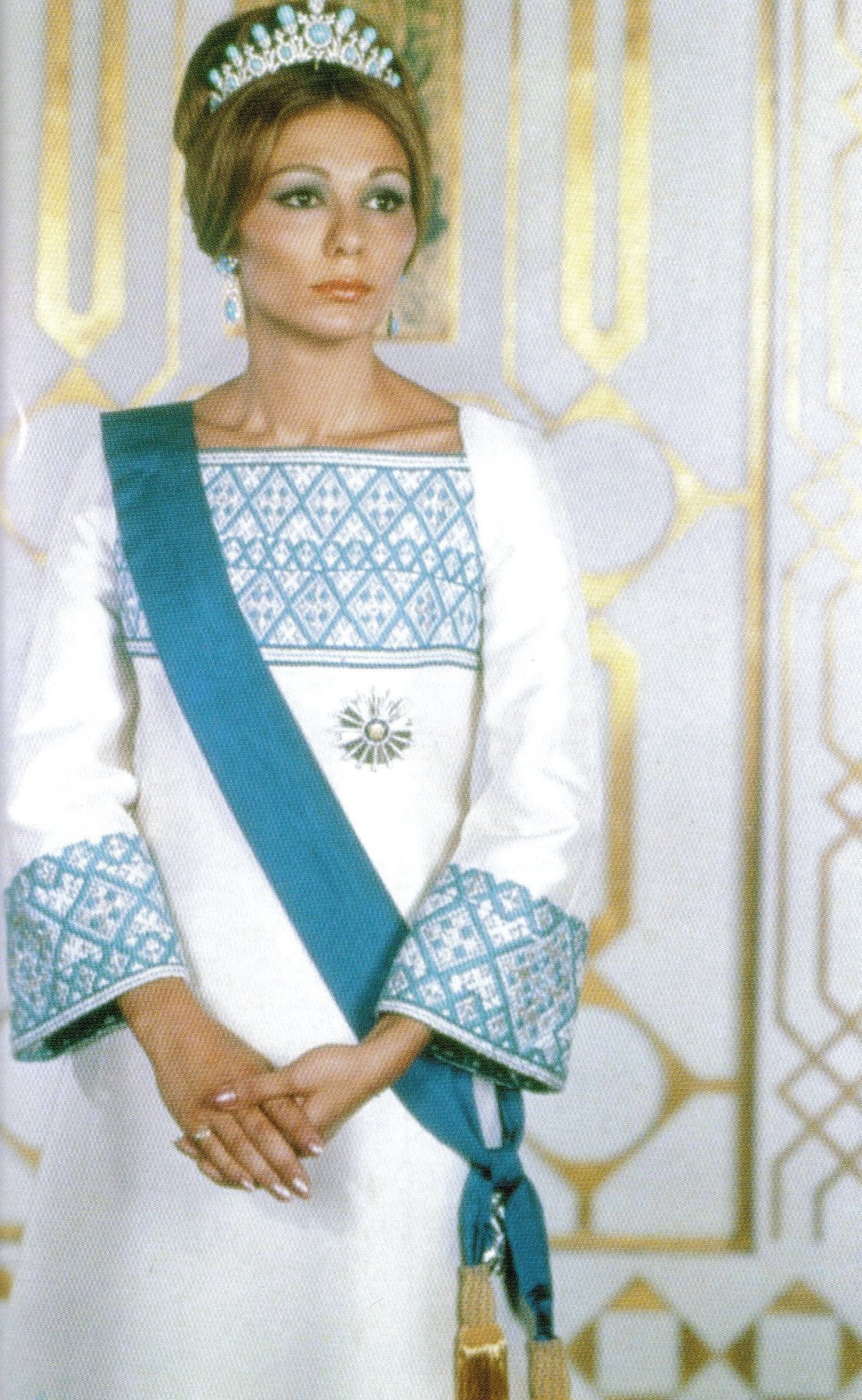
Shahbanu Farah Pahlavi, dress designed by Mehr Monir Jahanbani and Keyvan Khosrovani featuring Balochi needlework

In Tehran, Jahanbani showcased these needlework for sale at a boutique named "Nini" which was owned by her mother. Over time, she dedicated part of her home to display these works.

Mehr Monir Jahanbani expanded the Balochi needlework color palette from five colors to approximately three hundred, significantly enhancing its artistic appeal. Her innovative designs garnered widespread attention, including from Farah Pahlavi, the Shahbanu of Iran, who incorporated them into her wardrobe. This collaboration not only brought international recognition to Baluch handicrafts but also provided economic opportunities for many local women, allowing them to showcase their skills.

Later, along with Keyvan Khosrovani and Pari Zolfaghari, Jahanbani ventured into designing and creating haute couture clothing. A notable example of their work is Farah Pahlavi's white dress with blue and gold embroidery along the borders and front.

At the height of her efforts, Mehr Monir Jahanbani employed over a hundred Baluch women, helping them achieve financial independence.

After the Iranian Revolution in 1979, Jahanbani attempted to maintain her connections with the Baluch women and continued to place orders for their work. However, the onset of the Iran–Iraq War and the prevailing atmosphere made this increasingly difficult.

=== Death ===
Jahanbani died on 7 August 2018, in Tehran, Iran, after a stroke.
