= Amanullah Jahanbani =

Iranian general and historian (1891–1974)

Timsar Amanullah Jahanbani
- امان‌الله جهانبانی
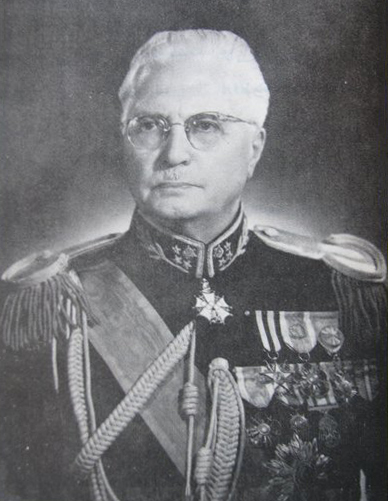

Member of the Iranian Senate
- In office 19 August 1951 – 1 February 1974

Minister of War
- In office 9 March 1942 – 10 August 1942
- Monarch: Mohammad Reza Pahlavi
- Prime Minister: Ali Soheili; Ahmad Qavam
- Preceded by: Mohammad Ali Foroughi
- Succeeded by: Ahmad Qavam

Minister of Roads
- In office 4 December 1941 – 9 March 1942
- Monarch: Mohammad Reza Pahlavi
- Prime Minister: Ali Mansur; Mohammad Ali Foroughi
- Preceded by: Seyyed Mohammad Sajjadi
- Succeeded by: Yadollah Azdi

Minister of Interior
- In office 21 September 1941 – 4 December 1941
- Monarch: Mohammad Reza Pahlavi
- Prime Minister: Mohammad Ali Foroughi
- Preceded by: Javad Ameri
- Succeeded by: Ahmad Amir-Ahmadi

Head of the General Directorate of Industry
- In office 21 December 1935 – 1938
- Monarch: Reza Shah
- Prime Minister: Mahmoud Djam
- Preceded by: ?
- Succeeded by: Ali-Asghar Hekmat

Chief of the Joint Staff
- In office 6 December 1921 – 12 February 1927
- Monarchs: Ahmad Shah Qajar; Reza Shah
- Prime Minister: Ahmad Qavam; Hassan Pirnia; Ahmad Qavam; Mostowfi ol-Mamalek; Hassan Pirnia; Reza Khan; Mohammad Ali Foroughi; Mostowfi ol-Mamalek
- Preceded by: Office Established
- Succeeded by: Habibollah Sheibani

Personal details
- Born: 1895 Tehran, Iran
- Died: 1 February 1974 (aged 79) Robat Karim, Iran
- Spouse: Helen Kasminsky
- Children: 12, including Nader, Khosrow, and Mehr Monir
- Education: Mihailovsky Artillery College; Nikolaevsky War Academy

Military service
- Allegiance: Qajar Iran (1902–1925); Pahlavi Iran (1925–1938)
- Branch/service: Persian Cossack Brigade (1902–1921); Imperial Iranian Ground Forces (1921–1938)
- Years of service: 1902–1938
- Rank: Lieutenant General
- Battles/wars: Simko Shikak revolt (1918–1922); Luri tribal insurgency in Pahlavi Iran; Sheikh Khazal rebellion; Simko Shikak revolt (1926)

Amanollah Jahanbani (Persian: امان ‌الله جهانبانى; 1895 – 1 February 1974) was a member of the Qajar dynasty of Iran and a senior officer during the reign of Reza Shah Pahlavi.

== Early life and education ==
Born in 1895, Jahanbani was the son of prince Amanullah Mirza Jahanbani and via him the great-grandson of Fath-Ali Shah Qajar. Jahanbani's mother, princess Iran Khanom Shams-ol-Molkara, was also a princess of the Qajar dynasty. At the age of 10, he was sent to St. Petersburg for schooling, where he attended the Mihailovsky Artillery College and the Nikolaevsky War Academy. He returned to Iran as a ranked military officer in World War I.

== Career ==
After completing his studies in Europe, Jahanbani joined the Cossack forces and became a major general. On 6 December 1921 Jahanbani was named the commander of gendarmerie headquarters following the dissolution of the Cossack Division by Reza Shah. He was appointed the chief of the staff with the rank of brigadier general at the beginning of the 1920s. As of 1925 he was the head of military academy. In 1928, he led the army in Balochistan attack to control the resistance. His path of success continued until 1938, when he fell out of favor and was thrown into the Qasr prison by Reza Shah. However, in 1941 he was named interior minister.

When Reza Shah was forced to abdicate during World War II, he was appointed to the Senate during the era of Mohammad Reza Shah Pahlavi where he served for five consecutive periods.

== Personal life and death ==
Jahanbani married three times and had a total of twelve children. His third wife, Helen Kasminsky, was Russian; they had four children together: Mehr Monir, Nader, Parviz, and Khosrow. Nader became the deputy head of the Imperial Iranian Air Force, Parviz was an officer in the Imperial Iranian Marines, and Khosrow was the second husband of Princess Shahnaz Pahlavi.

Jahanbani died in 1974, at the age of 83.

Jahanbani wrote an autobiography titled "Iranian Soldier: Meaning of Water and Soil," which was published in 2001 with the help of his son, Parviz.

== Other sources ==
- 'Alí Rizā Awsatí (عليرضا اوسطى), Iran in the Past Three Centuries (Irān dar Se Qarn-e Goz̲ashteh - ايران در سه قرن گذشته), Volumes 1 and 2 (Paktāb Publishing - انتشارات پاکتاب, Tehran, Iran, 2003). ISBN 964-93406-6-1 (Vol. 1), ISBN 964-93406-5-3 (Vol. 2).

Military offices
Preceded by Office created	Chief of the Joint Staff of the Imperial Iranian Armed Forces; 6 December 1921–12 February 1927	Succeeded by Habibollah Sheibani
