= Mahla Zamani =

Iranian fashion designer

- Born: مهلا زمانی; 11 December 1950; Tehran, Iran
- Died: 17 July 2023 (aged 72); Tehran, Iran
- Education: Pitman Institute, UK
- Occupations: Businessman; fashion designer
- Known for: Lotus fashion house
- Spouse: Mohammad Hossein Rastgou
- Children: 2, including Labkhand and Delband

Mahla Zamani (11 December 1950 - 17 July 2023 ) was an Iranian fashion designer, journalist and expert on Iranian traditional clothing.

== Life ==
She established the first fashion exhibition after the Iranian revolution (1979) and put significant effort in popularizing Iranian stylish clothing. In her view, Iranians need to revive their past and dress in elegant colorful and traditional styles (instead of black and Arabian dresses). Her efforts in advertising Persian, Qashqai, Kurdish, Turkmen and Baloch dress styles attracted international attention.

She has been attacked by fundamentalist circles and newspapers repeatedly.

In 2001 Zamani received permission to launch Lotus: A Persian Quarterly, Iran's first fashion magazine and the first Iranian magazine to show the faces of women since the establishment of the Islamic Republic.

Zamani was asked to design a dress for Queen Saleha of Brunei as a gift from Iran.
