= Maral Yazarloo =

Iranian motorcyclist and fashion designer

- Born: مارال یازرلو; 18 November 1981; Kelarabad
- Education: University of Tehran
- Occupations: Fashion designer, artist, motorcycle racer
- Awards: 100 Women (2018)

Maral Yazarloo-Pattrick (born Maral Yazarloo, Persian: مارال یازرلو; 1981) is an Iranian motorcyclist, fashion designer, artist, marketer, motivational speaker and campaigner of women's rights based in India.

== Early life and education ==
Maral Yazarloo was born in Kelarabad, Iran. She was raised and received her education in Iran. She secured a bachelor's degree in Business Development (BBD) from the University of Tehran. In 2004, she relocated to India to pursue her master's degree in business administration (MBA) and PhD in marketing from the University of Pune.

== Corporate career ==
Yazarloo started her corporate career with India-based realty company Panchshil in 2006 and served as Head of Retail and Marketing for 11 years till March 2017.

== Fashion design and art ==
Yazarloo studied fashion design in Milan and started the fashion label ‘House of Maral Yazarloo’ in 2012. She made her debut as a fashion designer at a show in Paris and also showcased her collections in Rome, London, India and Dubai. Yazarloo has also showcased her ceramic art and canvas paintings at exhibitions in Iran and India. Her flagship store and design workshop are located in Pune, India.

== Biking ==
Yazarloo's first bike was a Harley Davidson 48 and then the Harley Nightrod Special.

Yazarloo was the first woman to own Ducati & BMW GS motorcycles in India, was the HOG (Harley Owners Group) Officer (2015) and the Vice President of the Ducati Club (2016). She started the riding group ‘Ladies of Harley’ and is the founder of the first-ever Ladies Super Bike Club ‘Lady Riders of India’.

== Solo World Biking Tour – 'Ride To Be One' ==
In March 2017, Yazarloo-Pattrick commenced a solo world biking tour across the seven continents with no backup or team.

The ride started from India and through 18 consecutive months, Yazarloo covered 64 countries and traversed over 110,000 km. This solo bike ride was set to break stereotypes and create the world record for women bikers in Asia and Middle East.

Yazarloo has been campaigning for Iranian women to get permission and licenses to ride motorbikes. She is also an advocate for awareness about rape and domestic violence on women.

== Influence ==
Yazarloo-Pattrick has been a speaker and panelist on industry forums that include the Retail Forum in Las Vegas, LFS (Luxury, Fashion & Style) Conclave in India and ADL Milan. She has also been a motivational speaker at forums that include TEDx SIUKirkee Pune, Virginia Commonwealth University of Qatar and Symbiosis International University.

In February 2017, Yazarloo-Pattrick received the 'Pune's Most Powerful' award from Femina Magazine, India.

In 2018, BBC News listed Yazarloo-Pattrick as one of their '100 Inspiring and Influential Women from around the world for 2018'. In 2020, she won The Economic Times 'ET GEN NEXT Icons Award'.

== Personal life ==
Yazarloo-Pattrick has lived in Pune, India since 2004. An ardent traveller, Yazarloo-Pattrick has backpacked across 67 countries around the world. She married Alexander William Pattrick in October 2017 at Machu Picchu in Peru, while on her solo world biking ride. During the last 6 months of her ride, she was pregnant. Her daughter, Nafas Elizabeth Pattrick was born in November 2018. Yazarloo-Pattrick resides in New Delhi, India.
