= Paria Farzaneh =

English-Iranian fashion designer

- Born: North Ferriby, East Yorkshire
- Education: Ravensbourne University London
- Occupation: Fashion designer
- Known for: Menswear
- Label: paria /FARZANEH

Paria Farzaneh is an English fashion designer of Iranian descent, based in London. She founded the menswear label paria /FARZANEH in 2017, and her collections combine hand-printed Iranian textiles with streetwear silhouettes. Farzaneh was named a NEWGEN "One to Watch" by the British Fashion Council in 2018, was a semi-finalist for the 2019 LVMH Prize, and was shortlisted for the BFC/GQ Designer Fashion Fund in 2023.

== Early life and education ==
Farzaneh grew up in a village in Yorkshire, where her family was, in her words, part of the "five percent minority". Her parents had emigrated from Iran before she was born; her grandfather was a tailor there, and her grandmother and mother also made clothes. She studied Fashion Menswear Design at Ravensbourne University London, graduating in 2016.

== Career ==
Farzaneh launched her label, paria /FARZANEH, in London in 2017. She drew early attention that year when Frank Ocean wore one of her printed T-shirts for his headline set at the Lovebox Festival in London. Her early shows at London Fashion Week Men's included an autumn/winter 2018 presentation staged in an Iranian restaurant. The British Fashion Council selected her as a NEWGEN "One to Watch" in 2018, and she was a semi-finalist for the LVMH Prize in 2019. By then her collections were sold by Farfetch, SSense, and Galeries Lafayette.

For her fall/winter 2020 collection, shown at London Fashion Week in January 2020, Farzaneh invited guests to an East London boys' school for a mock Iranian wedding, with men and women seated separately and vows exchanged in Farsi; the groom wore a paisley-printed ski jacket from the collection. Titled "Ceremony", the collection introduced outerwear and trousers made with Gore-Tex and Thermore insulation recycled from plastic bottles and fishing nets. In September 2020 she presented her spring 2021 collection, titled "Number 6", at a farm in Little Missenden in the Chiltern Hills, where explosions set off by a film pyrotechnics crew accompanied the models; it was one of the few shows that season held before a live audience. About half of the collection was upcycled from rejected fabrics she had found at mills in Como. Writing in August 2020, Osman Ahmed of The New York Times placed Farzaneh in a wave of London-based women designing menswear, alongside Grace Wales Bonner, Martine Rose, Priya Ahluwalia, Bianca Saunders, and Mowalola Ogunlesi; her designs had also been worn by NBA players LeBron James and Nick Young.

Farzaneh began collaborating with Converse in 2018, when her London Fashion Week Men's collection included a reworked One Star Mid; for autumn/winter 2019 she applied patterns drawn from her Iranian heritage to the Chuck 70. In 2020 she was the first collaborator to rework Converse's Pro Leather X2, giving the basketball shoe an Iranian paisley print made with traditional wood-blocking techniques; the shoe debuted at the "Number 6" presentation and went on sale in November 2020. A second Pro Leather X2 capsule, adding apparel and accessories inspired by 1990s sportswear, followed in September 2021.

In November 2022, amid the Mahsa Amini protests, Farzaneh released a limited-edition "Freedom" T-shirt, donating proceeds to the Abdorrahman Boroumand Center, a nonprofit documenting human-rights abuses in Iran. Her spring 2023 collection was shown at the Phoenix Garden, a community garden in central London; reviewing it for Vogue, Luke Leitch described trousers and shorts cut with a side-leg pleat as "fresh and new". In 2023, Farzaneh was shortlisted for the BFC/GQ Designer Fashion Fund, which went to Grace Wales Bonner. In October 2024 she collaborated with Hoka on the Restore Chukka, a recovery shoe reworked with jacquard patterns, mohair detailing, and elastic zig-zag laces. By 2024 she had stopped staging conventional fashion shows, saying she wanted to use her work as a platform for activism.

== Style ==
Farzaneh's work pairs traditional Iranian fabrics and motifs with the streetwear silhouettes she sees in London. She sources patterned cotton textiles from Isfahan, where artisans stamp the cloth by hand using carved wooden blocks in the Ghalamkar printing tradition; the dyes are plant-based, using saffron, turmeric, and pomegranate, and the fabric is washed in the river and dried in the sun. She has combined these textiles with technical materials such as Gore-Tex, and part of her output is upcycled; she has said, "Every piece is unique, and we only produce what we need." On the political reading of her work, she told Dazed in 2018: "The message isn't so much political, it's more to simply inform people about the culture ... and let people know that the Middle East isn't what most people believe it to be." She has said she values the distance that designing menswear gives her as a woman, arguing that in womenswear "the details of practicality are compromised by garments being cropped, tight or short".
