= Khosrow Jahanbani =

Iranian royal (1941–2014)

- Born: 27 February 1941; Tehran, Imperial State of Iran
- Died: 16 April 2014 (aged 73); Geneva, Switzerland
- Spouse: Shahnaz Pahlavi (m. 1971)
- Issue: Keykhosrow Jahanbani; Fawzia Jahanbani
Names
- Khosrow Khoban Mirza Jahanbani
- Dynasty: Qajar
- Father: Amanullah Jahanbani
- Mother: Helen Kasminsky

Khosrow Jahanbani (Persian: خسرو جهانبانی; 27 February 1941 – 16 April 2014) was the son of Iranian general Amanullah Jahanbani and second husband of Princess Shahnaz Pahlavi.

== Early life ==
Jahanbani was born on 27 February 1941 and was the youngest son of Iranian general Amanullah Jahanbani, great-grandson of Fath-Ali Shah Qajar. His mother, Helen Kasminsky, was from the Russian aristocracy in Petrograd. His grandfather served as governor of Azerbaijan. He was the younger brother of Nader Jahanbani who was executed in February 1979 after the Iranian revolution.

== Personal life and death ==
Jahanbani and Shahnaz Pahlavi, the eldest daughter of Shah Mohammed Reza Pahlavi, became close friends in Switzerland where the former was studying arts. They married at the Iranian Embassy in Paris in February 1971. In a publication of the Islamic Republic of Iran it is argued that the marriage was not supported by Shahnaz Pahlavi's father, Shah Mohammad Reza Pahlavi.

They had two children.

Jahanbani died on 16 April 2014 after combating cancer for several years.
