= Music of Khorasan =

Traditional and regional music of Khorasan

- Native name: موسیقی خراسان
- Other names: Khorasani music, Khorasan regional music
- Cultural origins: Khorasan
- Typical instruments: Dotar, kamancheh, ney, sorna, dohol, qoshme, percussion

Subgenres
- Northern Khorasan music, Eastern Khorasan music, Southern Khorasan music

Music of Khorasan (موسیقی خراسان) refers to the diverse regional musical traditions of Khorasan, particularly those practiced in northeastern Iran and in historically and culturally connected areas of Afghanistan and Central Asia. The traditions encompass Persian-, Turkic-, Kurdish-, and Turkmen-speaking communities and vary considerably between northern, eastern, and southern parts of the region.

Khorasani music developed through a long history of interaction among Iranian- and Turkic-speaking populations and between settled and nomadic communities. Modern administrative boundaries do not correspond precisely to its musical regions, which are distinguished largely by language, repertoire, performance practice, and local tradition.

== Regional traditions ==
=== Northern Khorasan ===
Northern Khorasan is particularly associated with the Bakhshi tradition. Bakhshis are musicians who combine instrumental performance on the dotar, singing, storytelling, and the transmission of poetry and epic narratives. Their repertoires include Persian, Khorasani Turkic, and Kurmanji Kurdish material.

The central form of the bakhshi repertoire is the dāstān, a narrative performance in which spoken prose alternates with sung poetry accompanied by the dotar. The subjects include romance, religious and mystical stories, and heroic narratives.

Northern Khorasan is also associated with āšeq performers, who commonly provide music for weddings, circumcisions, dances, and other social occasions. Ensembles may include the dohol, sorna, qoshme, kamancheh, and violin.

=== Eastern Khorasan ===
The eastern musical area includes regions such as Torbat-e Jam, Taybad, Khaf, and Kashmar. Its traditions differ in several respects from those of northern Khorasan. In the eastern region, singers (khvānanda) and dotar players (navāzanda) are often separate performers, and it is also common for two dotar players to accompany one or more singers.

Eastern Khorasan has longstanding cultural and musical connections with Herat, and musicians from Torbat-e Jam and Taybad have historically maintained links with Herat. Some musicians from the region have continued to travel between eastern Khorasan and Herat for performances and cultural occasions.

The repertoire of eastern Khorasan includes Persian sung poetry, mystical poetry, narrative traditions, and instrumental maqams. Among the best-known maqams associated with Torbat-e Jam are Allah-Madad and Navā'i.

==== Music of Torbat-e Jam ====
Music of Torbat-e Jam is an important regional tradition within the eastern Khorasan musical area. Torbat-e Jam has been described as one of the important musical centers of the region, particularly for its dotar tradition and sung poetry.

The repertoire includes instrumental maqams and sung poetry. The maqams Allah-Madad and Navā'i are particularly associated with the musical tradition of Torbat-e Jam; Navā'i is also widespread elsewhere in Khorasan, although it has distinct regional characteristics in Torbat-e Jam.

The relationship between poetry, Sufism, and music is particularly prominent in eastern Khorasan. Repertoires include poetry attributed to figures such as Abdullah Ansari, Rumi, Attar of Nishapur, Jami, and Ahmad-e Jami.

Torbat-e Jam has also been extensively documented through recordings. Published collections include Musiqi-e Torbat-e Jām performed by Nur-Mohammad Dorpur and Zolfqar Asgaripur, a recording performed by Abdollah Sarvar Ahmadi, and later recordings featuring Gholam-Ali Purʿatai, Nur-Mohammad Dorpur, Abdollah Sarvar Ahmadi, and Gholam-Ali Neynavaz.

=== Southern Khorasan ===
Southern Khorasan has its own repertories of sung poetry and regional songs. Birjand is one of the important centers of the area's musical culture, and the region has been represented in recordings and performances of southern Khorasani music.

The singer Sima Bina, who was born in Birjand, has performed and recorded music based on southern Khorasani traditions and has contributed to their wider dissemination.

== Musical forms and repertoire ==
Khorasani music consists of melody types generally referred to as āhang ("tune") or maqām. Turkmen traditions may also use the term sāz for instrumental repertoire.

Sung poetry is central to many Khorasani musical traditions. The principal poetic form is the Persian čahār-bayti or do-bayti, while other forms include ghazal, gharibi, faryād, and the narrative repertories associated with dāstān performance.

The literary repertoire is strongly connected with the history of Khorasan and includes mystical, religious, romantic, heroic, and historical themes. Oral narratives have also preserved stories about regional figures and historical events.

== Instruments ==
The dotar is one of the principal instruments associated with Khorasani music. Different regions and communities use distinct forms of the instrument, with differences in construction, tuning, playing technique, and repertoire.

The dotar has a particularly prominent status in Torbat-e Jam, where the instrument has remained central to regional musical performance.

Other instruments used in Khorasani traditions include the kamancheh, ney, sorna, dohol, qoshme, violin, and various percussion instruments.

== Musicians and masters ==
Khorasani musical traditions have been maintained through professional, semi-professional, and amateur musicians, many of whom have inherited musical knowledge through several generations. In some traditions, musicians have learned through master–pupil relationships, while family transmission and oral memorization have also played an important role.

=== Northern Khorasan musicians ===
Notable musicians associated with the northern Khorasan tradition include Sohrab Mohammadi, Haj Qorban Soleimani, Haj Hossein Yeganeh, and Nazar-Mohammad Soleimani. Their performances and repertoires have been documented in field recordings and published collections.

The contemporary musician Sohrab Mohammadi is associated with the bakhshi tradition of northern Khorasan, while Haj Qorban Soleimani became known internationally through recordings and performances of Khorasani bardic music.

=== Eastern Khorasan and Torbat-e Jam musicians ===
Among the documented musicians of eastern Khorasan are Nur-Mohammad Dorpur, Zolfqar Asgaripur, Abdollah Sarvar Ahmadi, Gholam-Ali Purʿatai, Gholam-Ali Neynavaz, and Nazar-Mohammad Soleimani.

Nur-Mohammad Dorpur (d. 2015), a singer from the Torbat-e Jam area, was reported to know more than one thousand verses. His repertoire reflects the importance of Persian literary and mystical poetry in eastern Khorasani music.

Abdollah Sarvar Ahmadi is documented as a dotar player associated with Torbat-e Jam. His performance of Allah Madad has also been preserved in the Smithsonian Folkways collection.

Gholam-Ali Purʿatai is documented as both a vocalist and dotar player in recordings of Torbat-e Jam music. His performances were included in the Regional Music of Iran series.

== Performance and social context ==
Music has historically been performed in weddings, circumcision ceremonies, private gatherings, religious settings, and other social events. In northern Khorasan, āšeq ensembles are particularly associated with weddings and dance, while bakhshi and related performers traditionally present music for listening, storytelling, and ritual contexts.

In eastern Khorasan, music is also associated with Sufi traditions. Many contemporary musicians in the region have belonged to branches of the Naqshbandi order, and music forms part of some religious practices conducted in private homes and at shrines.

Historically, teahouses were important venues for bakhshi, naqqāl, and darvish performances. Their importance declined after the social and political changes of the late 20th century and the closure of many teahouses after the 1979 Iranian Revolution.

Since the late 1960s, festivals have become important venues for Khorasani musicians. Regional music festivals, radio, television, recordings, and concerts have contributed to the continued transmission and wider dissemination of the traditions.

== Transmission and documentation ==
Musical knowledge in Khorasan has traditionally been transmitted orally. Master–pupil instruction, family teaching, memorization, performance, and participation in community events have all contributed to the preservation of repertoires and techniques.

Audio recording has become an important tool for documentation. The Harvard University Stephen Blum Collection of Music from Iranian Khorāsān contains extensive ethnographic recordings made between 1968 and 2006. The collection documents musical traditions from northeastern Iran and includes recordings in Persian, Khorasani Turkish, and Kurmanji Kurdish.

Researchers and recording projects have also documented regional repertoires from Torbat-e Jam, northern Khorasan, southern Khorasan, Sabzevar, and other areas. Published recordings have helped preserve performances by individual master musicians and make regional repertoires accessible beyond their local communities.

== UNESCO recognition ==
In 2010, UNESCO inscribed the Music of the Bakhshis of Khorasan on the Representative List of the Intangible Cultural Heritage of Humanity.

UNESCO describes the tradition as involving the performance of vocal and instrumental music by bakhshis, principally on the dotar, with repertoires in Persian, Turkish, Kurdish, and Turkmen. The tradition includes poetry and epic narratives and is transmitted through traditional and modern forms of master–pupil training.

The UNESCO inscription applies specifically to the music of the Bakhshis of Khorasan and does not constitute an inscription of all musical traditions practiced throughout Khorasan.

== Contemporary music ==
Contemporary Khorasani musicians continue to perform traditional repertoires while experimenting with new forms of expression. Some musicians have moved to Tehran or abroad, while others remain in Khorasan and continue local performance traditions.

Contemporary collaborations have also combined Khorasani instruments and repertories with other musical approaches. Iranica notes, for example, the work of dotar player Hamid Khezri, who has participated in a trio combining electronic music and dotar.

== See also ==
- Music of Iran
- Iranian folk music
- Music of the Bakhshies of North Khorasan
- Bakhshi
- Dotar
- Torbat-e Jam
- Herat
