= Shariati (disambiguation) =

Shariati (pertaining to Sharia) may refer to:

== People ==
- Ali Shariati, Iranian revolutionary and sociologist
- Ali Shariati, Iranian activist and political prisoner
- Azita Shariati, Iranian-born Swedish business executive
- Effat Shariati, former Member of the Parliament of Iran
- Hadi Shariati, Iranian director

== Places ==
- Bagh-e Shariati, village in Javaran Rural District, Kerman Province, Iran
- Shariati Metro Station
- Shariati-ye Yek, village in Kut-e Abdollah Rural District, Khuzestan Province, Iran
