= Bakshi =

Bakshi may refer to:

== Indian title ==
Bakshi is a historical title used in India, deriving from Persian word for "paymaster", and originating as the title of an official responsible for distributing wages in Muslim armies.

- Bakshi Ghulam Mohammad, Prime Minister of Jammu and Kashmir from 1953 to 1964.
- Bakshi Tirath Ram Vaid, a soldier of British India.

== Indian surname ==
=== Kashmir ===
Bakshi is a surname used by Kashmiri Pandits native to the Kashmir Valley of Jammu and Kashmir, India.

=== Odisha ===
In Odisha Bakshi (Odia: ବକ୍ସି) surname mainly used by Zamindar Karanas.

=== Punjab ===
Derived from the historical title, "Bakshi" came to be used as a surname among Punjabi Hindus and Sikhs, used by the Brahmin and Jatt castes respectively, in the Punjab region in India.

- Amit Singh Bakshi (1925–2024), Indian hockey player
- Anand Bakshi, Indian songwriter
- Chandrakant Bakshi, Indian author
- G. D. Bakshi, Major General of Indian Army
- Kanwaljit Singh Bakshi, New Zealand member of parliament
- Padumlal Punnalal Bakshi, Indian Hindi-language writer
- Praveen Bakshi, Lieutenant general of Indian army
- Ramprasad Bakshi (1894–1989), Gujarati writer
- Rohit Bakshi (actor), Indian actor
- Rohit Bakshi (neurologist), American academic
- Sachindra Bakshi, Indian freedom fighter participated in kakori train robbery
- Tirath Singh Bakshi Deputy Inspector General of Police (DIG Police) during the British Raj
- Zorawar Chand Bakshi (1921–2018) Indian general

== Jewish surname ==
Bakshi is also a Jewish surname, from the Turkish word for garden.

- Eliyahu Bakshi-Doron, a former Sephardi Chief Rabbi of Israel
- Ralph Bakshi, American animator and film director

== Other surname ==
- Aleksandre Bakshi, Georgian tennis player

== Fictional characters ==
- Brad Bakshi, one of the main characters in Mythic Quest.
- Byomkesh Bakshi, a fictional Indian-Bengali detective created by author Sharadindu Bandyopadhyay.
- Hrundi V. Bakshi, the main character in the 1968 film The Party.

== See also ==
- Bakhshi
- Bakshy (sometime spelled bakshi) a shamanic music by Turkish people from Northern Iran and Turkish countries
- Baksi (surname)
