= Azita =

Azita (Persian: آزیتا) is a Persian feminine given name meaning “free-woman” and "Goddess of Fire" popular in Iran.

== People ==
- Azita Emami, Iranian-American engineer
- Azita Emami (nurse), Iranian-Swedish nurse
- Azita Ghahreman (born 1962), Iranian poet
- Azita Ghanizada (born 1978/79), Afghan American actress
- Azita Hajian (born 1958), Iranian actress
- Azita Moguie (born 1965), Iranian film director
- Azita Raji (1961–2022), Iranian-born American diplomat, banker, and philanthropist
- Azita Sahebjam, ballet director in Vancouver, Canada
- Azita Shariati (born 1968), Iranian-born Swedish business executive
- Azita Youssefi (born 1971), Iranian-American experimental musician
