= Rohit Bakshi =

Rohit Bakshi may refer to:

- Rohit Bakshi (neurologist), American neurologist
- Rohit Bakshi (actor), Indian actor
- Rohit Bakshi (entrepreneur) (born 1982), Indian entrepreneur and former 3x3 professional basketball player

== See also ==
- Bakshi, a surname
