= Mohammad Khordadian =

Iranian-American dancer

- محمد خردادیان
- Born: 22 February 1957 (age 69); Sabzevar, Iran
- Occupations: Dancer, choreographer, entertainer
- Years active: 1983–present
- Spouse: Jean Beaini (divorced)

Mohammad Khordadian (Persian: محمد خردادیان Mohammad Khordādiyān; born 22 February 1957) is an Iranian-American choreographer, dancer and entertainer. His dance instruction tapes of Persian and Arabic dance have become popular inside Iranian society. In 2006, during a TV interview he came out and became one of the few Iranian celebrities who declared to be homosexual. He resides in Los Angeles, California.

== Biography ==
The youngest of four children, Mohammad Khordadian was born in Sabzevar. Inspired by Jamileh, a famous Iranian female dancer of the 60s and 70s, he started dancing when he was a child. Then he joined the National Folk Company of Iran, a local troupe, and performed in Roodaki Opera House where he met his future wife, Jean Beaini.

Before leaving Iran he was a taxi driver in Tehran, after the Islamic Revolution he fled his country to build a new life as a dance teacher and performer in Los Angeles. He released Workout and Dance Lesson #1, his first video of dance instruction, in the early 1980s. In 1987, he published Persian dance #2. Despite legal prohibition of dance under the new regime, both his works found their way to Iranian families mainly through the black market and television stations run by Iranian exiles. On 22 March 2008, Khordadian and his company performed at Los Angeles Music Center.

Currently he lives in Los Angeles and gives lessons in Iranian dance to Iranian residents of the United States.

== Trial ==
Following the death of his mother and because of his father's ill health, Khordadian returned to Iran to visit his family. This was his first visit after more than 20 years. In May 2002, as he was trying to leave the country, he was arrested in Tehran's Mehrabad Airport. He spent 21 days in solitary confinement and 40 days in the Evin Prison.

On 7 July 2002, Khordadian was convicted on charge of "promoting depravity and corruption among the youth" through his dance videotapes. His sentence to 10 years prison was later suspended, but he was barred from giving dance lessons for life, even outside Iran. The court also banned him from attending weddings for three years, except for his relatives'. He was finally released from prison and returned to Los Angeles. He later stated that he had not been tortured physically and the judge did not interrogate him over his private life.). The don't ask don't tell policy was utilized in denial of homosexuality by keeping quiet and overlooking homosexual issues by the Iranian government. In the case of Khordadian he was warned on entry to Iran to keep a low profile and limit his contacts to his immediate family – if he was successful, his treatment will be different from penalties typically levied by the Islamic Republic to transgender people. The authorities pretended that they were not aware of his presence in order to avoid punishing him. However, when this tactic failed and his presence had to be recognized, Khordadian was arrested and charged with issues unrelated to his sexual orientation, thereby persuading a "don’t ask" and "don’t tell" policy in this regard

== Personal life ==
Khordadian married an English woman named Jean Beaini. After the Iranian Revolution he moved to London with his wife who was a ballerina. After working in a club as dancers, they went to Los Angeles in the United States where they eventually divorced. In 2006, Khordadian told Alireza Amirghassemi of Tapesh TV that he was gay. According to him, his family accepted his homosexuality. He met and dated a younger Iranian man while he was visiting Iran. They lived together in Dubai for a time but eventually separated. Khordadian and his ex-wife, Jean Beaini, met up again in England and worked together on writing a book about their relationship and the time they spent together in Iran during the Iranian revolution. The title of the book is, For the Love of Mohammad: A Memoir and it was published in July 2014.

== See also ==
- Iranian folk music
