= Farzaneh Kaboli =

Iranian dancer and actress

- فرزانه کابلی
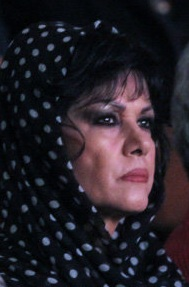
- Farzaneh Kabuli, 16 March 2015
- Born: 2 May 1949 (age 77); Tehran, Iran
- Education: Iranian National and Folkloric Dance Academy
- Known for: dance, choreography, acting

Farzaneh Kaboli (Persian: فرزانه کابلی, romanized: Farzâneh Kâboli; born 2 May 1949 in Tehran) is an Iranian dancer, choreographer, and actress. She is a leader in the Iranian Folkloric and National Dance Art, and a master of choreography in Iranian theaters.

== Early life ==
Farzaneh Kaboli was born and raised in Tehran, Iran. Both of her parents were musicians. Her uncle was Ali Asghar Garmsiri, a pioneer of Iranian theatre, and her uncle Houshang Shokati was a famous Iranian singer.

== Dance ==
Kaboli studied in the "Iranian National and Folkloric Dance Academy" for three years starting at age 18, it was the school for the National Folklore Society of Iran. The Academy had acquired some of the best dance instructors and choreographers in the world and Robert de Warren and his wife Jacqueline from England were the primary instructors. She eventually became a principal dancer for the school dance company, Mahalli.

She had been a famous ballerina prior to the Iranian Revolution, but in 1979 she was no longer allowed to dance in Iran. After the revolution, she taught private dance classes in her Tehran apartment as part of an underground dance movement. Performing in dance public after the revolution meant the risk of being jailed or fined. In the summer of 1998, Kaboli returned to the stage in Iran at Vahdat Hall for the first time in 22 years, alongside her students. She had started her own dance company in 1999, Harekat and performed for all-female audiences within embassies.

Kaboli has had many notable dance students, including Ulduz Ahmadzadeh and Ida Meftahi.

== Acting ==
Apart from dancing, Kaboli is an actress, which she started after the Iranian Revolution. Her first major role as an actress was in the play titled: All My Sons by Arthur Miller. She played a leading role in Hadi Marzban's production of Memoirs of the Actor in a Supporting Role (1982).

== See also ==
- Iranian cinema
- Iranian folk music
- Persian dance
