= Bakhshi =

Bakhshi (Persian: بخشی; adjective form of Bakhsh – a type of administrative division of Iran – which in itself is a hyponym of the Persian noun بخش (baxš), meaning part, portion; section; district; fortune) is a Dari, Persian, Pakistani, and Indian masculine given name and surname. Notable people with the name include:

== Given name ==
- Bakhshi Galandarli (1903–1985), Azerbaijani theatrical figure, actor, and director
- Bakhshi, one part of the Pakistani musical duo Bakhshi Wazir

== Surname ==
- Enayatollah Bakhshi (1945–2026), Iranian actor
- Esmail Bakhshi (born 1983), Iranian political prisoner
- Jon Bakhshi, American restaurateur of Iranian Jewish descent
- Mohammad Tawfiq Bakhshi (born 1986), Afghan judoka
- Rajan Bakhshi, Indian Army General officer
- Rena Bakhshi (born 1981), Dutch computer scientist
- Sandeep Bakhshi (born 1960), Indian banker

== See also ==
- Bakshi
