= Music of the Bakhshies of North Khorasan =

Traditional music in Central Asia

The music of the Bakshies of North Khorasan
- UNESCO Intangible Cultural Heritage
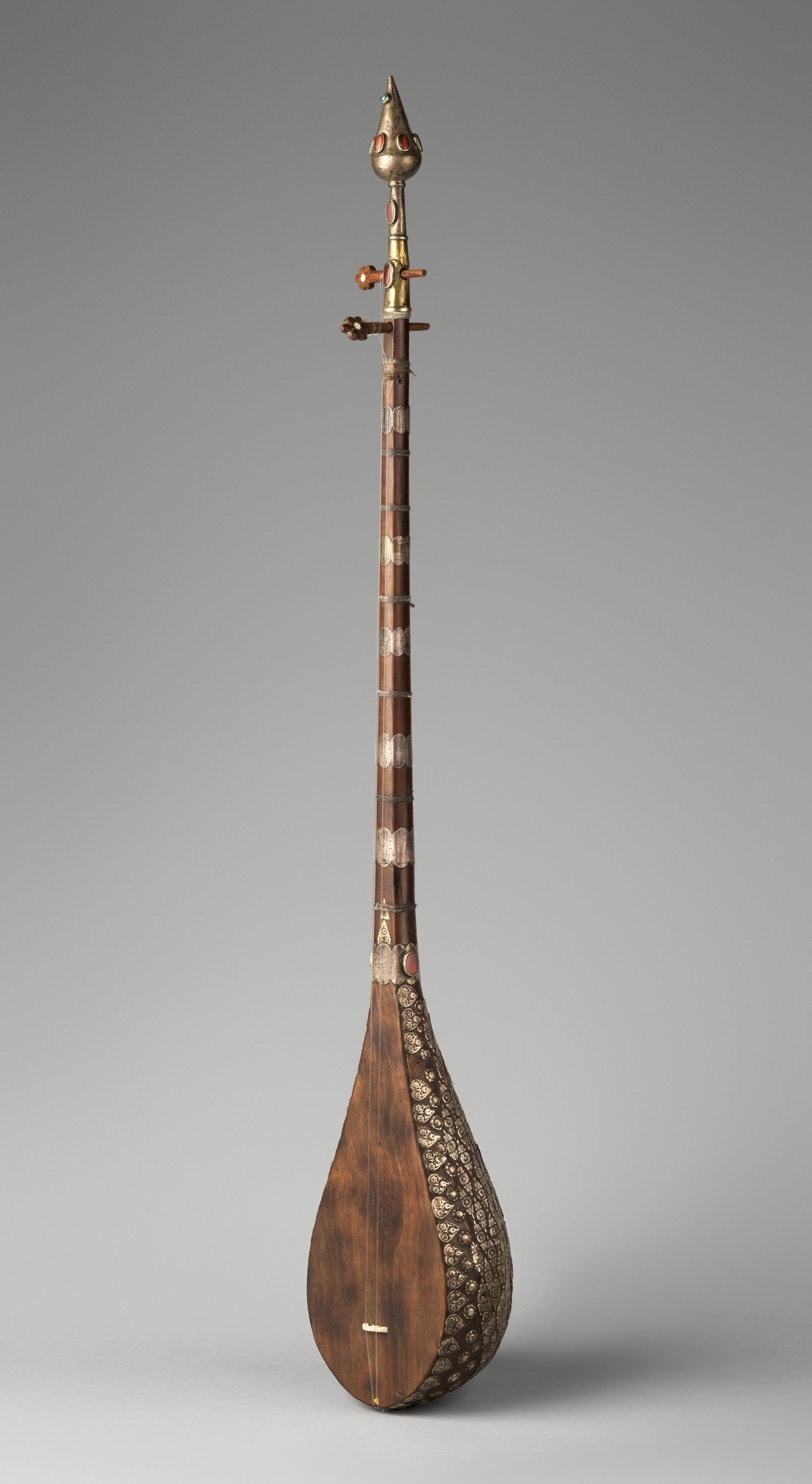
- A dotar, the main instrument of the Bakhshies of North Khorasan
- Country: Iran
- Reference: 00381
- Region: Central Asia

Inscription history
- Inscription: 2010

The music of the Bakshies of North Khorasan, which embodies a collection of poetry, literature, mysticism, and ethics, was inscribed as an Intangible Cultural Heritage of Humanity by UNESCO on June 22, 2011, through the efforts of Houshang Javid (fa) and Mojtaba Gheytaqi.

== Etymology ==
The term Bakshy refers to certain dotar players in North Khorasan and Turkmen Sahra. The Bakshies are not only dotar players but also singers, storytellers, poets, and instrument makers.

== Bakshies of Khorasan ==
The Bakshies of Khorasan, who live in the northern regions of the province and primarily work as farmers, are among the most authentic dotar players.

They orally pass down various stories and epics from generation to generation, preserving their cultural heritage.

The main centers of Bakshy tradition are Quchan, Bojnord, and Shirvan.

== Decline ==
Experts believe that the death of a musician is akin to the disappearance of their instrument and music. Without documentation and dedicated efforts for preservation, their art will not be passed down to future generations.

Houshang Javid, a researcher of regional music, asserts that the art of the Bakshies is now in decline and faces a serious threat of extinction.

== Controversies ==
Since the singers of Khorasan's Maqami music performed not only in Kurmanji but also in North Khorasan Turkish, Azerbaijan attempted to register this musical tradition as its own. However, after receiving a formal request from UNESCO, Iran compiled the necessary documents and successfully registered it as part of its intangible cultural heritage.

== Related searches ==
- Persian traditional music
