= Iranian dance =

Ethnic folk dance tradition

Dances in Iran or Iranian dances (Persian: رقص ایرانی) are dance styles indigenous to Iran. Genres of dance in Iran vary depending on the area, culture, and language of the local people, and can range from sophisticated reconstructions of refined court dances to energetic folk dances. The population of Iran includes many ethnicities, such as Kurds, Azerbaijanis, Arabs, Baluchis, Turkmen, Armenian, Georgian peoples, in addition to numerous Iranian tribal groups which can be found within the borders of modern-day Iran. Each group, region, and historical epoch has specific dance styles associated with it.

== Etymology ==
Raghs (also spelled as Raqs) is the Arabic word for dance, and is almost exclusively the word used for dance in Persian, as the Persian word for dance, paykubi, is no longer in common usage. It is also the word in Azerbaijani for dance (Reqs). The Kurdish word for dance is Halperke while the Luri language uses the word Bākhten (or Bāzee) for dance.

== Prehistory ==
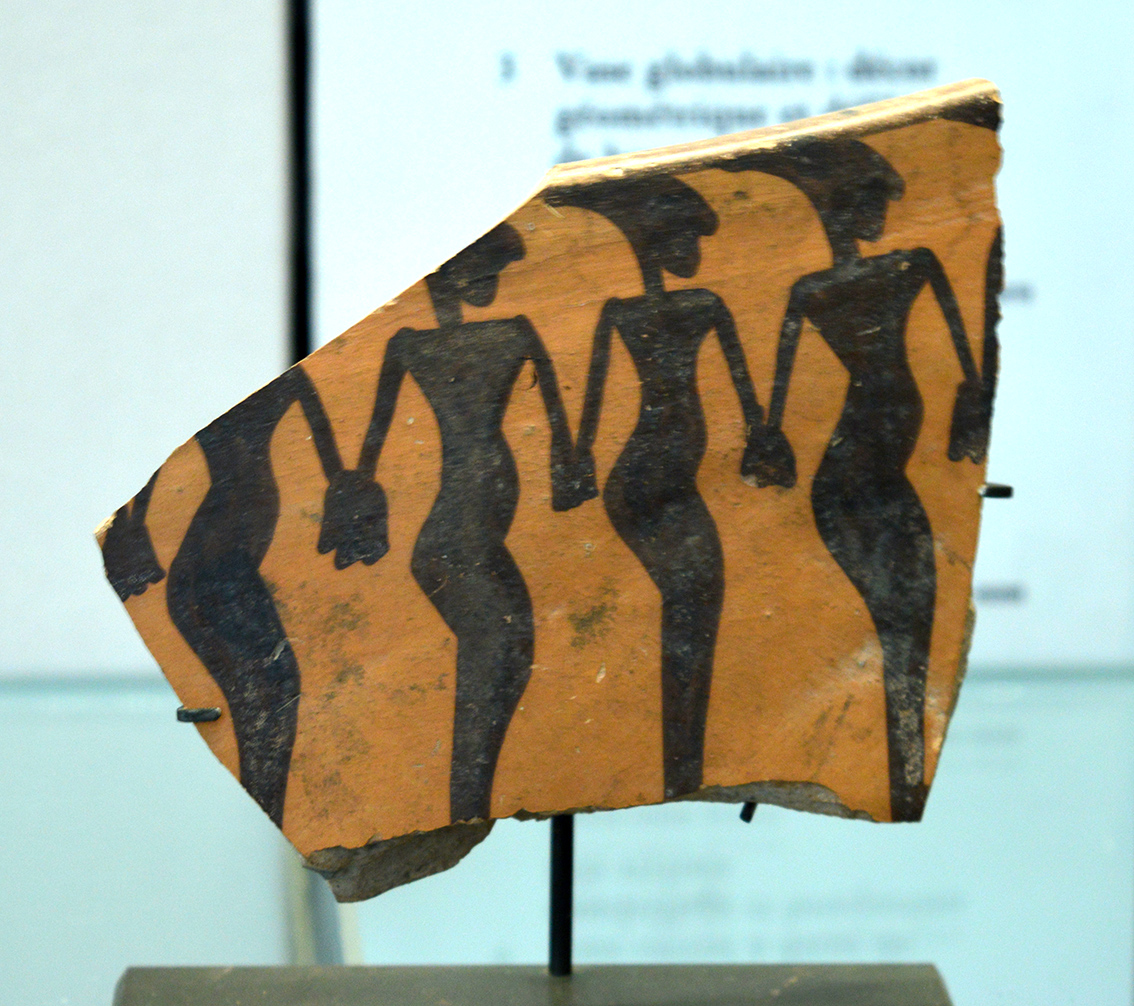
Dancers on a piece of ceramic from Cheshmeh-Ali (Shahr-e-Rey), Iran, 5000 BC now at the Louvre

The people of the Iranian plateau have known dance in the forms of music, play, drama or religious rituals and have used instruments like mask, costumes of animals or plants, and musical instruments for rhythm, at least since the 6th millennium BC. Cultural mixed forms of dance, play and drama have served rituals like celebration, mourning and worship. And the actors have been masters of music, dance, physical acts and manners of expression. Artifacts with pictures of dancers, players or actors were found in many archaeological prehistoric sites in Iran, like Tepe Sabz, Ja'far Abad, Chogha Mish, Tall-e Jari, Cheshmeh Ali, Ismaeel Abad, Tal-e bakun, Tepe Sialk, Tepe Musian, tepe Yahya, Shahdad, Tepe Gian, Kul Farah, Susa, Kok Tepe, Cemeteries of Luristan, etc.

== History ==
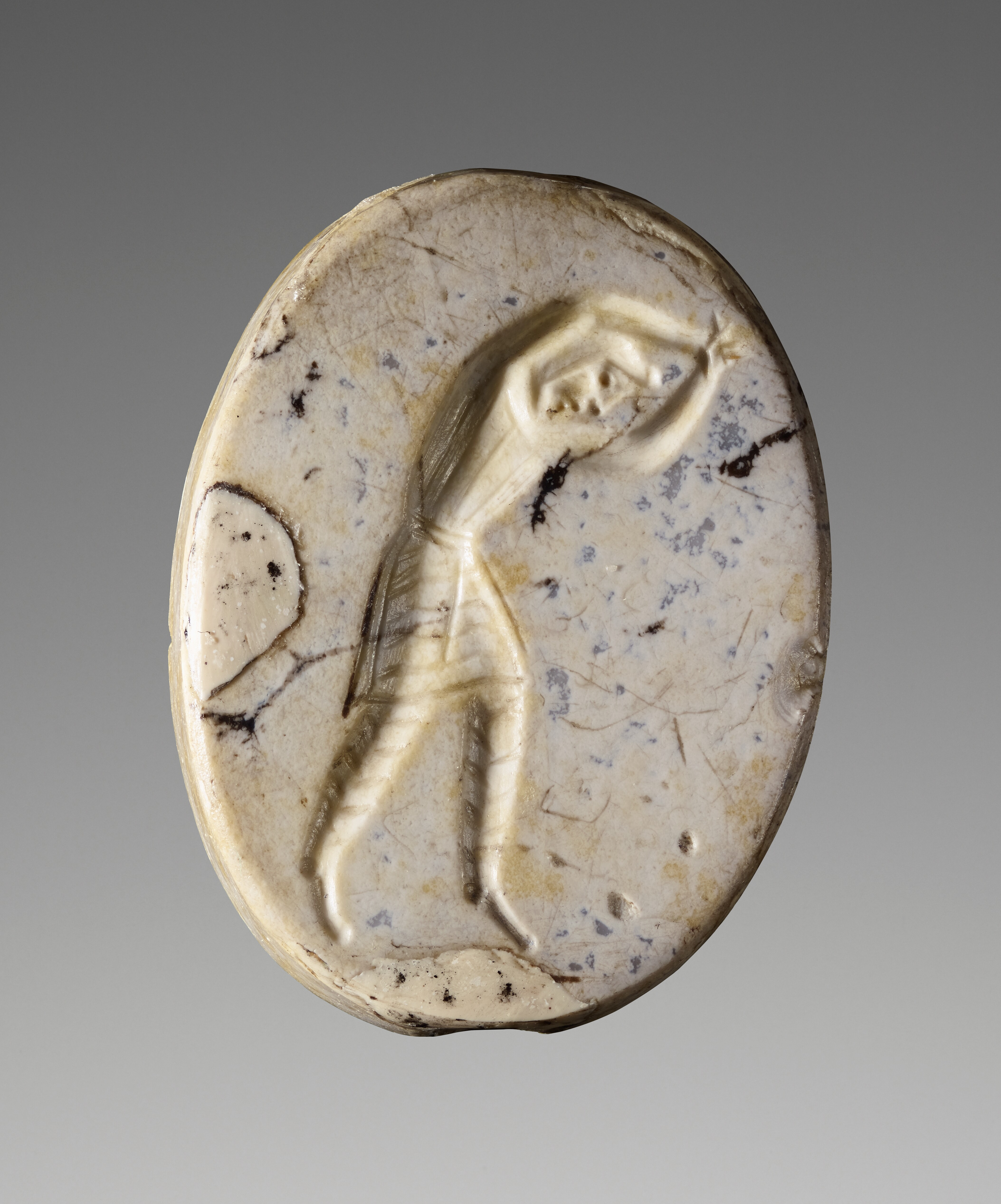
Seal with a Persian man dancing, Achaemenid period, dated c. 400 BC. Currently housed in the J. Paul Getty Museum in Los Angeles

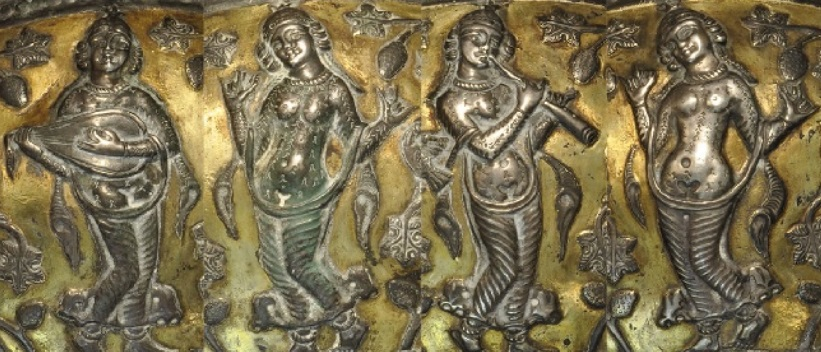
Dancers and musicians on a Sasanian bowl

The earliest researched dance from historic Iran is a dance worshiping Mithra (as in the Cult of Mithras) in which a bull was sacrificed. This cult later became highly adhered in the Roman Empire. This dance was to promote vigor in life. Ancient Persian dance was significantly researched by Greek historian from Herodotus of Halikarnassos, in his work Book IX (Calliope), in which he describes the history of Asian empires and Persian wars until 478 BC. Ancient Persia was occupied by foreign powers, first Greeks, then Arabs, and then Mongols and in turn political instability and civil wars occurred. Throughout these changes a slow disappearance of heritage dance traditions occurred.

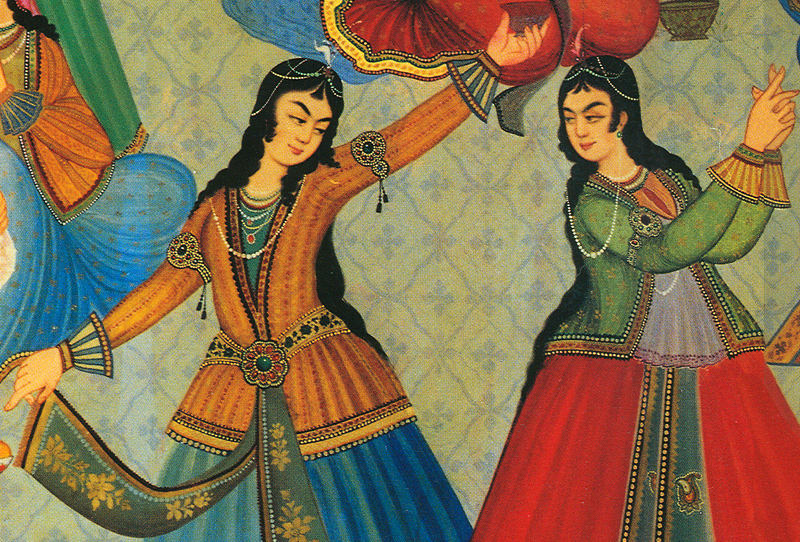
17th century Persian women dance in a ceremony in Iran

Religious prohibition of dancing in Iran came with the spread of Islam, but it was spurred by historical events. Religious prohibition to dancing waxed and waned over the years, but after the Iranian Revolution in 1979 dancing was no longer allowed due to its frequent mixing of the sexes. The Islamic Revolution of 1979 was the end of a successful era for dancing and the art of ballet in Iran. The Iranian national ballet company was dissolved and its members emigrated to different countries. According to the principles of the “cultural revolution” in Iran, dancing was considered to be perverse, a great sin, immoral and corrupting. As a result, many of the talented Persian dancers moved to the West and spread out mainly in Europe and the United States and a new generation of Iranian dancers and ballet artists have grown up in the Diaspora.

== Genres of dance ==
Iran has four categories of dance: chain or line dances, solo improvisational dance, war or combat dances and ritual or spiritual dances.

- Chain or Line dances are often named for the region or the ethnic groups with which they are associated.
- Solo dance usually includes reconstructions of Safavid and Qajar Court Dance. These often are improvisational dances and utilize delicate, graceful movements of the hands and arms, such as wrist circles.
- War or Combat dances imitate combat, or help train the warrior. It could be argued that men from the zurkhaneh (lit. "house of strength", a traditional Persian gymnasium) and their ritualized, wrestling-training movements are known as a type of dance called Raghs-e-Pa but could also be seen as a martial art.
- Ritual or spiritual dances, are often Sufi are known as sama and also a type of zikr (religious chant). There are various types of dancing in a trance for healing practices in Iran and surrounding areas. One healing ritual that involves trance, music, and movement is called le’b guati of the Baluchis of Eastern Iran, which is performed to rid a possessed person of the possessing spirit and appears to be in a similar state as an exorcism. There is a term in Balochi, gowati, for psychologically ill patients (possessed by wind) who have recovered through music healing, music as medicine.

The word sama, from the Arabic root meaning "to listen," refers to the spiritual practice of listening to music and achieving unity with the Divine. Dancing mystics (regardless of their specific religious identifications) are called Dervish.

Contemporary social dances and urban dance performed at festive occasions like weddings and Noruz celebrations focus less on communal line or circle dances and more on solo improvisational forms, with each dancer interpreting the music in her own special way but within a specific range of dance vocabulary sometimes blending other dance styles or elements.

== Iranian dance styles ==
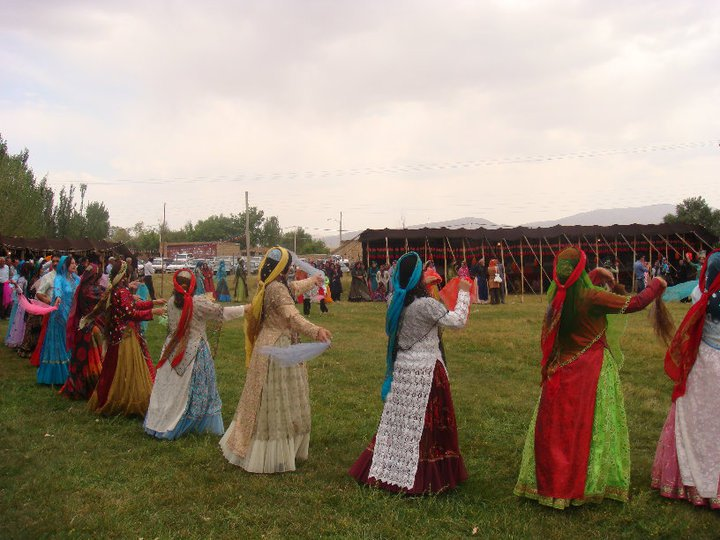
Basseri dance

This is a list of some of the ancient and contemporary Iranian dances, from various ethnic groups within Iran.

- Baba Karam, a chain dance, derived from a Sufi story whereby a servant at the court of the king falls in love with one of the harem girls and sings this song out of grief from not being able to be with her, traditionally featured male dancers but nowadays also performed by women. Baba Karam sometimes refers to contemporary Persian Hip-Hop dancing.
- Bandari dance, a chain dance, is often referred to as Persian bellydance. Bandari dance is a chain dance that often involves multiple people dancing and often perform this at parties, traveling around in a circle and sometimes stepping into the centre for a solo with encouragement from other dancers, the only variations are in the arm movements. It is a Persian dance that prevails in the South of Iran next to the Persian Gulf and has been influenced by Arabic music and dance. It is a combination of rhythmic movements in various directions according to the beat of the song. The distinct feature of this dance is the way performers wave their hands in a unique manner that resembles the cooperation of a group of fishermen at the sea. The word bandari means "of the port" and is a derivation of the Persian word bandar, meaning port.
- Basseri dance is a traditional dance performed by the Basseri tribe who live in the Fars province. The dancers wear their traditional and colorful clothes.
- Bojnordi dance: Bojnord is a village in the northeast section of Iran inhabited by a Turkic people. Men and women dance separately or together in Bojnordi dance, snapping their fingers in the method known as peshkan. Dancing in a circle with running and step hop steps, the dancers may turn alternate directions facing first one side then the next, dancers sometimes facing one another. Men or women may dance and wave small colorful scarves, called dastmal.
- Choob bazi, also known as chob bazi, chub-bazi, çûb-bâzî or raghs-e choob, is a chain dance found all over Iran, performed by men with sticks, the name translates to English as 'stick play'. There are two types of Choob bazi dance styles, the first one being more combative in style, only performed by men (normally only two men, assuming the roles as the attacker and the defender) and does not appear to have a rhythmic pattern; this style is more frequently found in Southwestern Iran. The second style Choob bazi is a circle or line dance with pattern, performed by both sexes and is more of a social dance.
- Classical Persian court dances, solo dances, improvisational, often utilize delicate, graceful movements of the hands and arms with animated facial expressions are central to the concept of that difficult-to-define flirtatiousness. Persian classical dance has not been organized and codified. Thus each dancer creates her own style and improvises within a recognizably Persian framework of movements. Costumes for these types of dance feature rich silks, brocades and flowing long skirts.
- Haj Naranji dance: an upper body motion is emphasized, with hand motions, trunk undulations and facial expressions being points of attention.
- Jâheli is a dance popularized in the 1960s and 1970s by the Persian dancer Jamileh. It is part of an Iranian sub-culture that has its origins in the 9th and 10th centuries, a period when Turkic and Mongol tribes seeking pasturage and pillage formed an incursion in eastern Iran. Local, informal constabularies were formed to protect each town or village and the men of these groups, called jâhel (meaning “ignorant” in Farsi), along with women, developed a culture and dance with a mixture of street smarts and spirituality.
- Khaliji dance: a contemporary dance done in largely improvisational, performed by pairs or groups of women for their own entertainment at special celebrations, such as weddings. There is also a type of Khaliji music from the Persian Gulf region.
- Kereshmeh dance: solo, 19th Century Iranian royal court dance
- Kharman dance
- Khorasani dance
- Latar dance
- Le’b Guati: a spiritual dance by the Baluchis of Eastern Iran to rid a person of a possessing spirit
- Lezgi dance: Azerbaijani and Caucasian folk dance; comes in variations of styles based on region
- Luri dance
- Matmati
- Mazandarani dance
  - Lak Sema
  - Dasmal Sema
  - Majme Sema
  - Lampa Sema
  - Derum Bakordan
  - Tesh Sema
  - Chakka Sema
  - Saz Sema
  - Sema Hal
- Motrebi dance: professional public dancers from the Qatar period, sometimes also prostitutes or party entertainment. In contemporary Iran this is a dance associated with low-class nightclub performers.
- Qasemabadi, also known as Ghasem Abadi, is a chain genre, rice-harvesting dance of the Gilaki people from the Gilan province of Iran near the Caspian Sea.
- Raghs-e-Pa, also known as Raqs-e Pa or Pay-Bazi, is the traditional gymnasium footwork dance found at zurkhaneh (a traditional Iranian gym). The name translates to English as "foot dance".
- Raghs-e-Pari: Persian fairy dance
- Raghs-e Parcheh: Persian veil dance
- Raghs-e Sharqi: belly dancing
- Ru-Howzi: a comic theatre performance on domestic life that includes some dancing
- Sama-o-raghs: a spiritual Sufi dance of joy that involves chanting. Dancers move to the rhythm of the music, often continuing until they fall into a trance or collapse from exhaustion.
- Chaap dance: a balochi dance mostly performed by forming a circle by a group of people, dancing and clapping in the southeast of iran. Chaap is a Balochi word that means clapping,
- Shamshir dance: war dance involving a sword, also known as Shamshir-bazi; usually performed in Sistan and Baluchestan province
- Shateri dance: classical Persian dance often compared to Arabic dance but without any hip movements
- Tehrani dance: also known as Tehrooni, Tehran-style nightclub dancing
- Vahishta: a Sufi, spiritual dance
- Yalli, also known as Yally or Halay, an Azerbaijani chain folk dance, starts slowly and finishes fast at almost running speed. Traditionally it was a celebration of fire, which was a source of heat, light, and warm food. In ancient times dancers worshiped fire as a goddess.
- Zaboli dance: a folk, chain dance, from the Sistan and Baluchestan Province in Southeastern Iran
- Zār: a spiritual dance, from Southern coastal regions of Iran. People believe in the existence of winds that can be either vicious or peaceful and possess people. They are healed through a specific ceremony and dance.
- Zargari dance: a chain dance, from the Zargari people, a Romani-related ethnic group deriving from the Zargar, Iran area

== Notable dancers ==
=== Contemporary and historical dancers ===
This list of contemporary and historical Persian dancers or choreographers (in alphabetical order, of various dance styles) includes:

- Jamileh, Los Angeles-based, belly dancer
- Farzaneh Kaboli, Iranian actress and dancer
- Mohammad Khordadian, Iranian-American dancer
- Shahrokh Moshkin-Ghalam (Paris based, modern dancer)
- Azita Sahebjam, dancer and director of the Vancouver Pars National Ballet

=== Notable dance ensembles ===
- Ballet Afsaneh, a female dance troupe focused on Persian culture along the Silk Road, based in the San Francisco Bay Area.

== See also ==
- Middle Eastern dance
- Persian theatre
- Music of Iran
- Azerbaijani dances
- Farzaneh Kaboli
