= Mulla Kamal Khan =

Iranian/Baluch folk musician

Mulla Kamal Khan ملا کمال خان
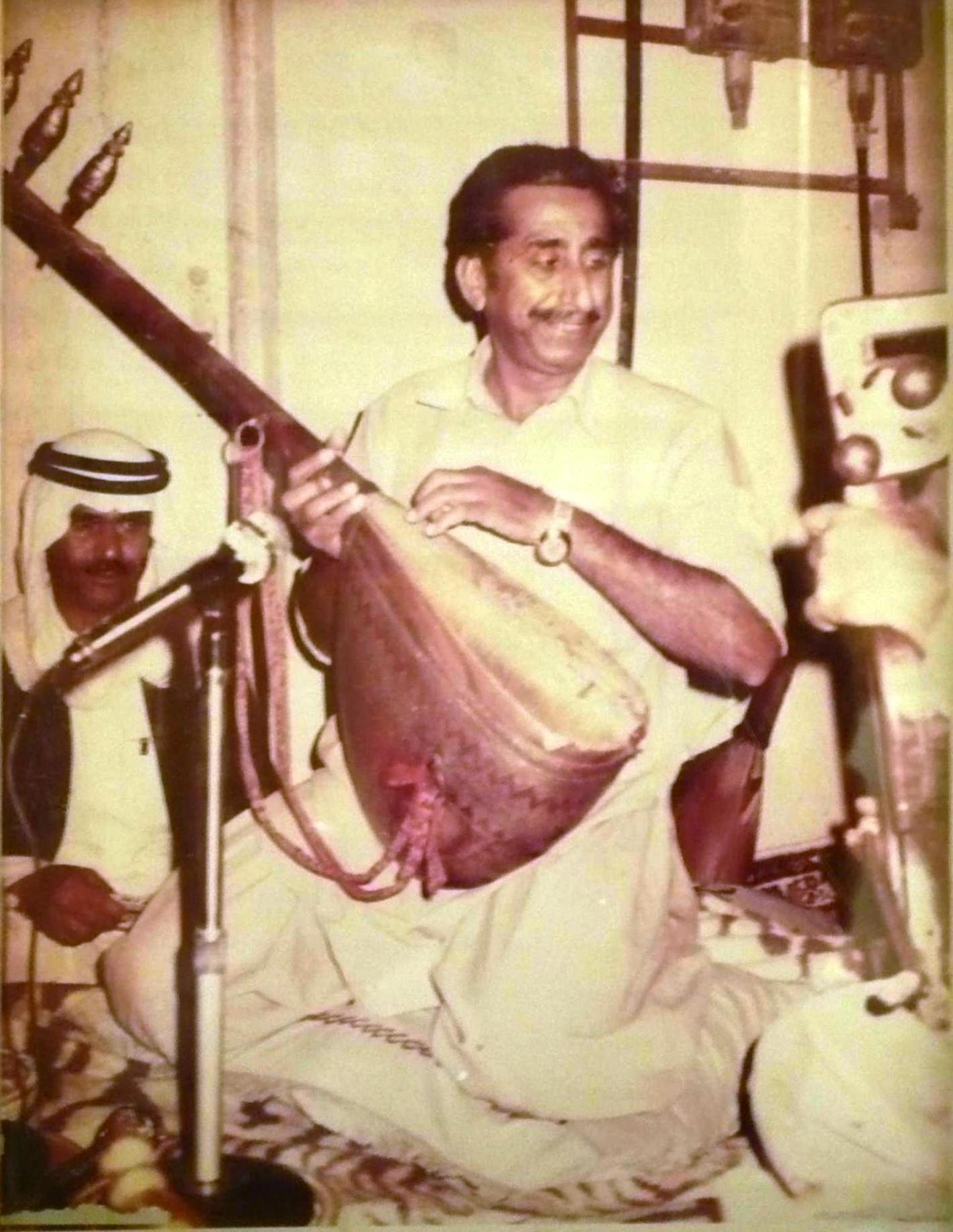
- Mulla Kamal Khan performing in Qatar in the 1980s

Background information
- Born: Latidan, Dashtyari district, Balochistan Iran
- Genres: Baluchi music, Iranian folk music
- Occupation(s): Singer, writer and folklorist

Mulla Kamal Khan or Kamalan (ملا کمال خان ) (1941 – February 21, 2010) was a Baluch folklore vocalist. He was born in 1941 in the village of Latidan, Dashtyari district, Chabahar County in the Sistan and Baluchistan province of Iran. His talent was first discovered in a traditional Balochi wedding ceremony, where many Baloch tribesmen gathered to listen traditional Balochi heroic songs. He went on to become one of the most influential singers in Baluchistan and gained fame among Baloch people and even among non-Balochis.

== Songs ==
- Hani and Sheh Mureed: a real love story of the Mir Chakar Rind era that became a myth in Baluchistan.
- Shahdad and Mahnaz : is a story of legendary bold woman (Mahnaz) who defended her right against an adultery accusation in men-dominated society of Baluchistan.
- Dad Shah: story of a Baluch rebel who rose against Rezah Shah Pahlavi of Iran.
- Hammal Jiand or Hammal son of Jeehand: The story of a Baluch hero who rose against Portuguese colonialists in Makran.
- Makkoran o Makkoran or o-my-Makran : is a nationalist song which admires Makran as a part of Baluchistan.

== Acclaim ==
Mohammad-Reza Shajarian, one of the most distinguished Persian traditional musicians, admired Mulla and spoke publicly in his honor. Mulla was awarded one of the most prestigious music prizes of Iran in 2007. He was awarded the Pride of Performance by the Khatami government (Iran).

== Death ==
Mulla died on 21 February 2010 of cancer. Many people from around Balochistan took part in the funeral ceremony. The first anniversary of his death was observed by the Syed Literary Council and commemorated within the Balochi community of the United Arab Emirates.

== See also ==
- Chabahar
- Baluchi music
- Iranian folk music
