= Baksi (surname) =

Baksi is a surname. Notable people with the surname include:

- Joe Baksi (1922–1977), American heavyweight boxer
- Kurdo Baksi (born 1965), Swedish social commentator and author
- Mahmud Baksi (1944–2000), Kurdish writer and journalist

== See also ==
- Bakshi
