= Shahrokh Moshkin Ghalam =

Iranian modern dancer (born 1967)

- Born: شاهرخ مشکین‌قلم; 21 April 1967; Khorramshahr, Khuzestan province, Iran

Shahrokh Moshkin Ghalam or Shahrokh Moshkinghalam (Persian: شاهرخ مشکین‌قلم, Šâhrukh Muškîn-Qalam; born April 21, 1967, in Khorramshahr) is an Iranian modern dancer who lives and works in Paris. A graduate in history of art and theatre from the Paris 8 University, he is a choreographer, actor and director. He is also the founder and former artistic director of Nakissa Art Company. He is the first Iranian to be part of the prestigious Comédie-Française troupe.

== Style ==
He was born In Iran but moved to Paris in his early teens.

== Performed works ==
In 2002 the Royal Opera House of Covent Garden invited him to perform Seven Pavilion Ballet based on the works of great Persian poet Nezami. Dance Variations on Persian themes created in 2007 is his last work which is a collection of his best choreographies performed with Karine Gonzales the major dancer of his company.

== Acting career ==
For six years, he appeared under the direction of Ariane Mnouchkine with the Théâtre du Soleil and had major parts in plays such as Tartuffe, la Ville Parjure and Les Atrides. His theatre performances include Shakespeare's Twelfth Night with the Terrain Vague Company, Romeo and Juliet directed by Lionnel Briands, Dionysos, the Baccantes of Euripide directed by Usevio Lazaro, Soldier Tale of Strawinsky in theatre Athenée directed by Antoine Campo, A Streetcar Named Desire of Tennessee Williams directed by Phillip Adrian, and Bassa Selim in Mozart's Die Entführung aus dem Serail conducted by Marc Minkowski and directed by Jérôme Deschamps at the 2004 Festival d'Aix-en-Provence.

He has played and directed plays in Persian including:

- Zohreh va Manouchehr by Iraj Mirza
- Mardha va cheez from Makki
- Kafane Siah a play inspired by Mirzadeh Eshghi the early 20th century Iranian poet.

2004 - 2011, he has been an official member of La Comédie Française, one of the most prestigious theatre companies in Europe and has taken part in plays including:

- Pedro et le commandeur, Felix Lope de Vega
- Molière / Lully: L'Amour médecin / Le Sicilien ou l'Amour peintre, conducted by William Christie, m.e.s Jean-Marie Villégier
- La Maison des morts, Philippe Minyana, m.e.s Robert Cantarella,
- Yerma le Bonheur, Cyrano de Bergerac and others all played in French

== Personal life ==
He and his company Nakissa perform in various countries around the world and attend international festivals or events, such as the International Dance Festival in Boulder Colorado, Festival Meridas, Festival d'Asturias Festival de Chartres, Rotterdam, Rome, La Haye, and the Tirgan festival in Toronto. In 2009 he signed an open letter of apology posted to Iranian.com along with 266 other Iranian academics, writers, artists, journalists about the persecution of Baháʼís.

== See also ==
- Persian dance
- Comédie Française
- Shahrokh Moshkin Ghalam at IMDb
- Les Archives du Spectale
