= Ballet Afsaneh =

Ballet Afsaneh (Persian: گروه رقص افسانه) is a non-profit cultural organization devoted to the art, dance, music, and poetry of cultural heritage from Iran, Armenia, Tajikistan, Turkey, Afghanistan, Mongolia, China, and Uzbekistan.

== About ==
Ballet Afsaneh was founded in 1986 by Sharlyn Sawyer in the San Francisco Bay Area. The dance company has primarily consisted of women. The company's director Sharlyn Sawyer, is considered a pioneer of Central Asian choreography. The theme of the Silk Road features heavily in Sawyer's choreography. She conducted field research in Central Asia learning from honored artists about the music, dance and traditional regalia of various ethnic communities. Ballet Afsaneh has performed at the British Museum, the San Francisco Asian Art Museum, San Francisco City Hall, and in numerous theatrical and community settings.

The word "Afsaneh" is a Persian word that means "myth", "fable", or "legend". The dynamic group presents performances and activities featuring dance, poetry, and music of the Silk Road — the historic trade route that stretched thousands of kilometers across Central Asia from the China Sea in the east to the Mediterranean in the west.

In 2003, Afsaneh Art and Culture Society launched a translation project. The aim of this project is to increase the visibility of the contemporary Iranian literature on the world stage, create a greater opportunity for the literature to be part of the modern conversation and to receive its deserved international recognition.

In 2005 the organization was recruited to establish a cultural exchange program with artists in Tajikistan. The Tajik Dance Initiative engages Tajik artists, scholars and arts administrators with their international counterparts, creating opportunities for collaborative work, and support for the dance artists and related expressive arts of Tajikistan.

Sharlyn Sawyer A prolific artist, choreographer, and director Sharlyn Sawyer is considered to be a pioneer in world dance. She has produced and choreographed dozens of original works, as well as expanded traditional Central Asian and Mid-East dance forms for contemporary theater presentation. Her work melds ancient expressive art forms with modern dance and theater in a unique, richly imagistic approach, drawing on cultural heritage to create artwork that resonates with universal ideas. Her knowledge of traditional dance and creative passion led her to make a significant contribution to the preservation and development of Persian/Afghan/Central Asian dance at a critical time in history, directly as a dance artist, choreographer/director, and through the ongoing legacy of her many students. During a career spanning over 50+ years Sharlyn Sawyer has produced and choreographed performances for the Asian Art Museum of San Francisco, Farhang Foundation/Los Angeles, Cabrillo Music Festival, Marin Symphony, the Aga Khan Foundation, Museum of Fine Arts Houston, Golden Thread Productions – Island of Animals, Festival of the Silk Road, Nowrouz San Francisco City Hall, Neekon Festival in Golden Gate Park, and the San Francisco Ethnic Dance Festival. Working internationally, Sawyer created performances for the British Museum, and was sought out by the San Francisco philanthropic foundation, The Christensen Fund, to establish an ongoing performing arts exchange in Tajikistan. Sawyer has received prestigious grant awards for her work from the Creative Work Fund – Walter & Elise Haas Fund, California Arts Council, the William and Flora Hewlett Foundation, The James Irvine Foundation, Silicon Valley Community Foundation, as well as honorary awards from Persian, Afghan and Turkish cultural and humanitarian organizations.

== Performers and collaborators ==
- Aziz Herawi (Tajik/Afghan)

== Awards ==
- The Persian Center of the Bay Area
- The Shabe-Ashanaee Persian Cultural Organization
- The Persian Students Association of Stanford University
- Iranian American Society of New York
- San Francisco Mayor Gavin Newsom humanities achievement award
- Afghan Coalition
- Iranian Federated Women's Club-Payvand School

== See also ==
- Persian dance
- Persian traditional music
- Iranian folk music
