= Journal of Neuroimaging =

- Discipline: Neuroimaging
- Language: English
- Edited by: Rohit Bakshi

Publication details
- History: 1991–present
- Publisher: John Wiley & Sons on behalf of the American Society of Neuroimaging (United States)
- Frequency: Bimonthly
- Impact factor: 2.486 (2020)

Standard abbreviations
- ISO 4: J. Neuroimaging

Indexing
- ISSN: 1051-2284 (print); 1552-6569 (web)
- OCLC no.: 710019389

Links
- Journal homepage; Online access; Online archive

The Journal of Neuroimaging is a bimonthly peer-reviewed scientific journal covering all aspects of neuroimaging. It was established in 1991 and is published by John Wiley & Sons on behalf of the American Society of Neuroimaging. Since 2015, the editor-in-chief is Rohit Bakshi (Harvard Medical School). The founding editor-in-chief was Leon Prockop. He was succeeded in 1999 by Lawrence Wechsler and in 2008 by Joseph Masdeu.

== Abstracting and indexing ==
The journal is abstracted and indexed in:

- Abstracts in Anthropology
- Academic Search
- BIOBASE/Current Awareness in Biological Sciences
- Current Contents/Clinical Medicine
- Embase
- Expanded Academic ASAP
- Index Medicus/MEDLINE/PubMed
- InfoTrac
- ProQuest databases
- Science Citation Index Expanded
- Scopus

According to the Journal Citation Reports, the journal has a 2020 impact factor of 2.486.

== Prockop award ==
The John and Sophie Prockop Memorial Lectureship was established in 2005 by the founding editor, Leon Prockop, in memory of his parents. The recipient is the first author of a manuscript published in the prior year that has been judged to have outstanding value to the development and success of the journal or is the highest quality manuscript.
