= Rena Bakhshi =

Dutch computer scientist and mathematician

Rena Bakhshi (born 1981) is a Dutch computer scientist and mathematician and programme manager for the Netherlands eScience Center's natural sciences and engineering domain.

== Life and work ==
Bakhshi holds two master’s degrees. The first is in Applied Mathematics from Baku State University in Azerbaijan and the second in Computer Science from KTH Royal Institute of Technology in Stockholm. In 2011, she went on to receive a PhD in Theoretical Computer Science from Vrije Universiteit Amsterdam (VU) for which she studied formal modelling and analysis of large-scale stochastic systems under the supervision of Willem Jan (Wan) Fokkink and Maarten R. van Steen. She advised at least one student, Suhail Yousaf.

She took on postdoctoral positions as a fellow and Assistant Professor at VU, as well as Research Visitor at Australia's NICTA Sydney and University of Melbourne on large-scale complex systems, which included several interdisciplinary projects.

In 2016, Bakhshi joined the Netherlands eScience Center in Amsterdam to coordinate its climate science and physics projects. Since June 2021, she has served as the organization's Programme Manager for the Natural Sciences and Engineering domain.

She has published academic papers in computer science and mathematical logic and foundations.
