= Bakhshi Wazir =

Pakistani composer duo

Bakhshi Wazir بخشی وزیر
- Origin: Lahore
- Died: 11 January 1997
- Genres: Film score
- Occupation: Music directors of films
- Instruments: Percussion, orchestra
- Years active: 1961 - 1997
- Label: Awards: Amir Khusro Award for contributions in music (1987)

Bakhshi Wazir (1934 – 11 January 1997) were a Pakistani composer duo who created music for films, television, and radio from the 1960s to the 1990s.

The duo partnered two musicians Wazir Hussain and Bakhshi from Lahore. The duo was initially known for composing a Punjabi song "Jadon Hauly Jayi Lainda Mera Naa" (Singer: Noor Jehan, Movie: Att Khuda Da Vair) in 1970 that became an iconic track in Pakistan's Punjabi music history.

== Career ==
Wazir Hussain was born in 1934 in Lahore, British India. The musicians Wazir Hussain and Bakhshi were two friends from Bhati Gate, Lahore, who later formed a musical duo as Bakhshi Wazir. Wazir Hussain, who got music training from his paternal uncle Chote Ashiq Ali Khan, was expert in Raags, whereas Bukhshi was skilled in percussion, orchestra, and other musical arrangements. Starting their music career in 1961 with a film "Bekhabar", the duo wasted little time in making their reputation in the Lollywood films. At the end of their career, they had composed film playback music for around 250 films.

The Punjabi song "Jadon Holi Jai Laina Mera Naa" from the film "Att Khuda Da Vair" (1970), continues to be the song Bakhshi Wazir are best known for. Vocalized by the singer Noor Jehan, this Raag Darbari-based song has gained popularity over the past three decades. Reportedly, the first two lines of this song's opening verse were written by poet Tanvir Naqvi over the course of an entire evening, and the remaining verses were finished the next day by the same poet.

Another milestone of their career was the Punjabi song Akh Lari Bado Badi, again sung by Noor Jehan, for the film Banarasi Thhag (1973). Picturized on the actress Mumtaz, that club dance composition was a sensational hit of the era.

Once demand for Bakhshi Wazir's music in the Lollywood declined, they began composing music for Radio Pakistan and PTV. One of their significant projects was the narration of Syed Rizi Tirmizi's recording of the poet and philosopher Muhammad Iqbal's poems on CPU, Radio Pakistan, which included the voice of actor Muhammad Ali.

== Awards ==
- Amir Khusro Award in 1987 for contributions in music.

== Death ==
Wazeer Hussain died on 11 January 1997.

== Notable compositions ==
Bakhshi Wazir composed playback music for 10 Urdu and 54 Punjabi movies:

- 1966 (Film: Chughalkhor - Punjabi) — Assin Pichhli Raat Day Taray, Tay Saday Naal Pyar Na Karin... Singer(s): Irene Parveen, Poet: Hazeen Qadri
- 1966 (Film: Chughalkhour - Punjabi) — Mukh Tera Wekhya, Zaroor Thora Jeya Ni... Singer(s): Masood Rana, Poet: Hazin Qadri
- 1966 (Film: Nizam Lohar - Punjabi) — Pyar Kissay Naal Pavin Na, Kei Rupan Wich Phirn Behrupi... Singer(s): Masood Rana, Poet: Tanvir Naqvi
- 1968 (Film: Punj Darya - Punjabi) — Meray Sajray, Phullan Day Gajray, Kandeyan Day Wass Paiy Geye... Singer(s): Noor Jehan, Poet: Baba Alam Siaposh
- 1968 (Film: Pind Di Kurri - Punjabi) — Ajj Pind Di Kurri Rahwan Bhull Geyi A... Singer(s): Nazir Begum, Irene Parveen, Poet: Khawaja Parvez
- 1970 (Film: Mehram Dil Da - Punjabi) — Kinnu Haal Sunawan Dil Da, Koi Mehram Raaz Na Milda... Singer(s): Noor Jehan, Poet: Sultan Mehmood Ashufta
- 1970 (Film: Att Khuda Da Vair - Punjabi) — Jaddun Holi Jeyi Laina Mera Naa, Main Than Marr Jani Aan... Singer(s): Noor Jehan, Poet: Tanvir Naqvi
- 1972 (Film: Main Akela - Urdu) — Manzil Hay Na Hamdam Hay, Kuchh Hay To Agar Dam Hi Dam Hay... Singer(s): Masood Rana, Poet: ?
- 1972 (Film: Ik Pyar Tay Do Parchhawen - Punjabi) — Es Jagg Di Jadun Tak Kahani Rahway... Singer(s): Tassawar Khanum, Poet: ?
- 1973 (Film: Banarsi Thug - Punjabi) — Akh Lari Bado Badi, Moqa Milay Kadi Kadi... Singer(s): Noor Jehan, Poet: Khawaja Pervez
- 1973 (Film: Banarsi Thug - Punjabi) — Nashiyaan Nay Sarya, Hulya Vagarya... Singer(s): Masood Rana, Poet: Khawaja Pervaiz
- 1976 (Film: Ultimatum - Punjabi) — Eina Sohniya Da Dosto, Yaarana Bura Honda Jay... Singer(s): Inayat Hussain Bhatti, Poet: Waris Ludhyanvi
- 1976 (Film: Akhar - Punjabi) — Jan Kadh Leyi Aa BeImana, Jan Wali Gall Kar Kay... Singer(s): Afshan, Poet: ?
