= Hadi Shariati =

Iranian director and screenwriter (born 1980)

- هادی شریعتی
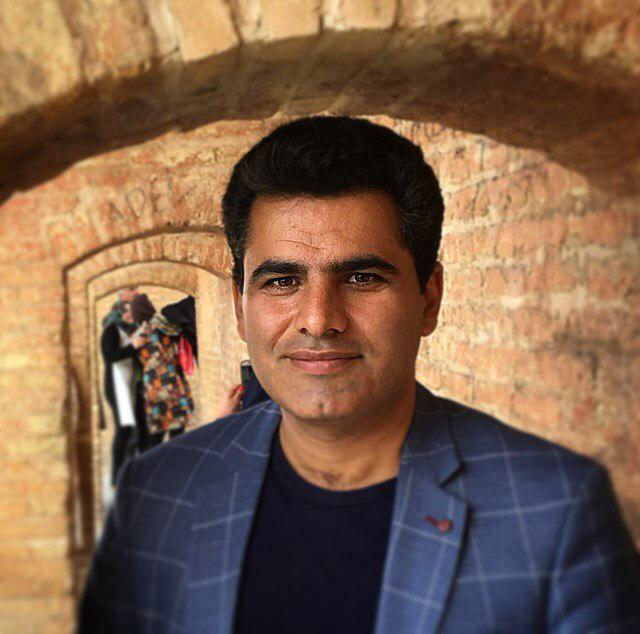
- Born: 1980 (age 45–46); Najafabad, Iran
- Occupations: Film director Screenwriter
- Years active: 2011–present
- Children: 1

Hadi Shariati (Persian: هادی شریعتی) (born 1980) is an Iranian director and screenwriter.

== Awards ==
He received the Best Screenplay Award from the International Film Festival for Children and Youth for his film Inside the Waves. He won the Best Documentary Diploma of Honor at the Tehran International Short Film Festival for his film Shadow of the King. Shariati received the Jury's Special Award from the 16th Iran International Documentary Film Festival (Cinéma Vérité) and the award for best feature documentary from the 14th Iran International FICTS Festival for the documentary film Sattar El Classico. Shariati was awarded the Secretary's Special Award by the 16th Cinéma Vérité Festival for the documentary film At Oughlan. He has won awards from the Queen Palm International Film Festival and LAKECITY International Film Festival for his documentary film Sarah which is about his daughter who is not able to see.

== Filmography ==
- Sarah
- Raghse Aftab
- Inside the Waves
- Familiar Voice
- Shadow of the King
- Sattar El Classico
- At Oughlan
