= Jamileh (dancer) =

Iranian actress, cabaret performer, and dancer

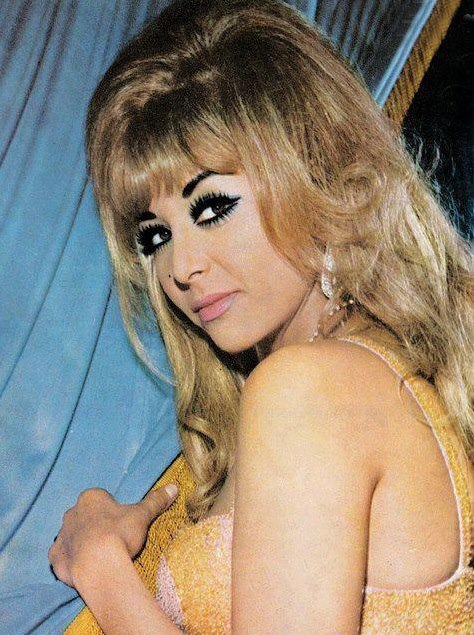
- Born: Fatemeh Sadeghi; 26 October 1946 (age 79); Tehran, Imperial State of Iran
- Occupations: Actress; cabaret performer; dancer
- Spouses: Javad Rafei (divorced) Mohammed Arbâb (died 1973)

Fatemeh Sadeghi (Persian: فاطمه صادقی; born 26 October 1946), better known by her stage name Jamileh (Persian: جمیله; also romanized as Ġamīle), is an Iranian actress, cabaret performer, and dancer. She is responsible for popularizing a version of the belly dance in Iran, and was reportedly the highest-paid cabaret actor of Iranian origin in 1974. She has also performed acting and dancing roles in many Iranian films of the 1960s and 1970s.

== Biography ==
=== Early life ===
Jamileh was born in 1946 in Tehran, Iran. Her father, Rajab Vâksi, was a walnut seller who later became an actor in the siâh theater scene in Iran. Her uncle, Morshed Nasrollâh, was a zarb player and an itinerant bard. As a child, she became proficient in belly dancing and performed with her father.

=== Dancing career ===
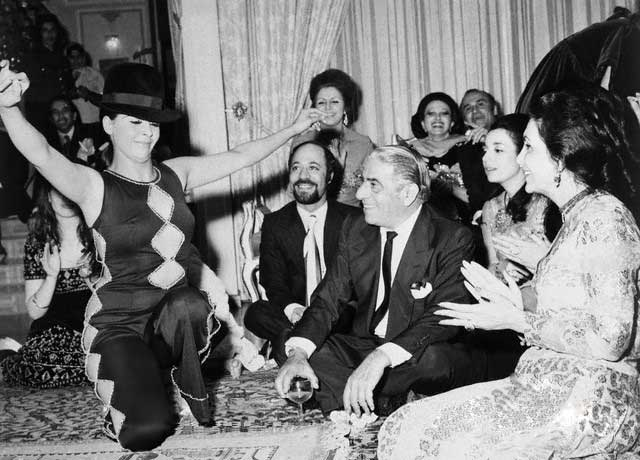
Jamileh dancing for Greek tycoon Aristotle Onassis in Tehran, Iran in 1972

Jamileh was first involved in the theater scene and mostly performed a self-taught style of Bollywood dance in traditional cafés. Her first marriage was to J.R., a singer of the ruhowzi genre of musical comedy in traditional Persian theater. She then married Mohammad Arbâb, the owner of the Bakara-Mulan Ruzh cabaret. After marrying Arbâb, she continued dancing and performed in cabarets such as Arbâb's Bakara-Mulan Ruzh as well as in her own cabaret, Lidu. Her marriage to Arbâb lasted until his death in 1973.

Much like other Iranian entertainers of the 20th century such as Susan, Delkash, and Googoosh, Jamileh's career dancing in cabarets provided her the opportunity to enter Iranian cinema, which would eventually lead her to national fame. She began her acting career after her marriage to Arbâb, aiming to be recognized as a "dancer-actor" in Iranian cinema, like Samia Gamal in Egyptian cinema. She mainly played dance-related roles in more than 25 films, including roles in Zan-e Vahshi-e Vahshi (1969), Dokhtar-e Zalem Bala (1970), and 'Aroos-e Paberahneh (1974). Many of the films she starred in were produced by Ferdowsi Film, owned by her husband Arbâb, including the 1971 film Khoshgeltarin Zan-e 'Alam. She was reportedly the highest-paid cabaret actor of Iranian origin in 1974, and performed for prominent foreign guests including Henry Kissinger and Aristotle Onassis.

=== Career after Iran ===
After fleeing Iran, Jamileh continued her career in Los Angeles, California, where she settled down. She performed frequently at the Cabaret Tehran in Los Angeles for more than 20 years and through her fifties.

== Legacy ==
Although dancers like Mahvash and Afat first introduced the belly dance and other Persian folk dances in Iranian cinema, Jamileh was responsible for popularizing a version of the dance in Iran through her performances and film roles. She is a master of Persian dances, including the traditional Bandari and Qasemabadi dances, and some classical Persian dances, and became known for her specific style of the belly dance, as well as Persian dances such as the jâheli dance style. The jâheli style of dance involves imitating a roughneck, jâhel man, and is more overtly erotic compared to more traditional Persian dances. It is often performed wearing a kolâh makhmali, a type of hat similar to a fedora.

According to Ida Meftahi, a historian specializing in modern Iranian history, Jamileh was not associated with the image of a stereotypical cabaret dancer in the media, but the image of "a valuable artist" that was likely improved with the help of her husband's influence.

== Filmography ==
Jamileh's dancing and acting roles in Iranian cinema include:

- Gohar-e shab-cheragh (The luminescent jewel, 1967)
- Zan-e Vahshi-e Vahshi (The wild, wild woman, 1969)
- Dokhtar-e Zalem Bala (The beautiful tyrant of a girl, 1970)
- Khoshgeltarin Zan-e 'Alam (1971)
- 'Aroos-e Paberahneh (The barefoot bride, 1974)
- Sharaf (The honour, 1975)
- Gol Pari Joon (1974)
- Jedal (1976)

== See also ==
- Persian dance
- List of Iranian women dancers

== General and cited references ==
- Breyley, GJ; Fatemi, Sasan (19 November 2015). Iranian Music and Popular Entertainment: From Motrebi to Losanjelesi and Beyond. Routledge. ISBN 9780415575126.
- Friend, Robyn (Winter 1997). "Jamileh: the Goddess of Iranian Dance". The Best of Habibi, A Journal for Lovers of Middle Eastern Dance and Arts. 16. Habibi Publications.
- Meftahi, Ida (14 July 2017). Gender and Dance in Modern Iran: Biopolitics on stage. Routledge. ISBN 9781317620624.
- "Spotlight: Dr Ida Meftahi". University of Maryland School of Languages, Literatures, and Cultures. University of Maryland. Archived from the original on 2 January 2020.
- Talattof, Kamran (1 June 2011). Modernity, sexuality, and ideology in Iran : the life and legacy of a popular female artist (1st ed.). New York: Syracuse University Press. ISBN 9780815651390.
- Walker, Philip (Spring 1996). "Raqqas or Jamileh: Contrasting Perspectives on Dance in Iran". The Best of Habibi, A Journal for Lovers of Middle Eastern Dance and Arts. 15. Habibi Publications.
- "Jamilah, hunarmand-i ba isti'dad va muvaffaq" [Jamileh, the successful and talented artist]. Ittila'at-i Salanah. Tehran: Mu'assisah'i Ittila'at. 1971.
- "جمیله؛ هنرمندی که در یاد ایرانیان همیشه می‌رقصد". Tavaana (in Persian). E-Collaborative for Civic Education.
