= Ali Shariati (political activist) =

Iranian activist and political prisoner (born 1988)

- Known for: Prisoner of conscience, hunger strike

Ali Shariati (born 1988) (Persian: علی شریعتی) is an Iranian activist and political prisoner. He was arrested in the demonstrations following acid attacks on women in Isfahan, (which was widely believed to be ignored by the authorities) and went on a 61-day long hunger strike demanding "just judiciary process".

== Activism ==
Ali Shariati is a graduate of architecture. He was first arrested on February 14, 2011, when Iranians who protested the stayed in Evin's solitary confinement for a month. In his trial, he was sentenced to 2 years imprisonment and lashing. Later, it was reduced to a year, and the lashing was forgiven. He was released after eight months.

On June 13, 2014, Ali was arrested in a peaceful demonstration in Tehran protesting the House Arrest of The Leaders of the Green Movement. He was accused of propaganda against the regime, but he was bailed and released.

On February 18, 2015, he was arrested in his house. Within two court sessions, he was accused of defamation, insulting the Supreme Leader, and organizing demonstrations against acid attacks in Iran. On September 11, 2015, he was sentenced to 12 years and 9 months of imprisonment. His sentence was later reduced to 5 years in the appeal court in June 2016.

Ali Shariati was arrested and taken to prison without any notice on October 10, 2016.

== Hunger Strike ==
Starting on October 10, 2016, he went on a hunger strike against the "unjust" process he had been through and stated that he wouldn't stop the strike till his demand for liberation was met. His strike was only one of the numerous hunger strike cases of Iranian political prisoners in the same period, with everyone having the same demands of a fair judiciary process. For a few days, he refused to drink as well, but as his condition started to worsen, he got back to a wet hunger strike. In a letter, he stated that he had fainted several times during the dry hunger strike days and had had an episode of apnea. He was then transferred to the prison clinic, where he was denied a phone. On December 25, 2016, he was transferred to the hospital. Doctors refuse to allow the authorities to take him back to prison due to the high risk.

According to his family, he has so far lost 20 kg/44 lbs. and has collapsed once during one of the visits. Ali Shariati's mom stated in an interview that his hunger strike "Faced significant ignorance by the authorities."

Shariati ended his hunger strike on January 14, 2017, following requests from his family and the ex-president of Iran, Mohammad Khatami.

== See also ==
Arash Sadeghi
