= Padumlal Punnalal Bakshi =

- Born: 5 December 1894; Khairagarh, Khairagarh State, British India (present-day Khairagarh-Chhuikhadan-Gandai district, Chhattisgarh)
- Died: 18 December 1971 (aged 77); Raipur, Chhattisgarh
- Occupations: Poet, essayist, novelist, short story writer
- Writing career
- Language: Hindi

Padumlal Punnalal Bakshi (27 May 1894 – 18 December 1971) was a Hindi essay writer who did his schooling from Khairagarh and higher education at Banaras Hindu University(BHU). From 1920 to 1925 he edited the famous "Saraswati magazine ".He also wrote many well known children’s poems and renowned essays such as “Bhudiya Chala Rahi Thi Chakki”,"Kya Likhun?","Shatdal" alongside famous essay collections like Panchavan,Padavan and Kuchh.
