= Jon Bakhshi =

American nightclub promoter

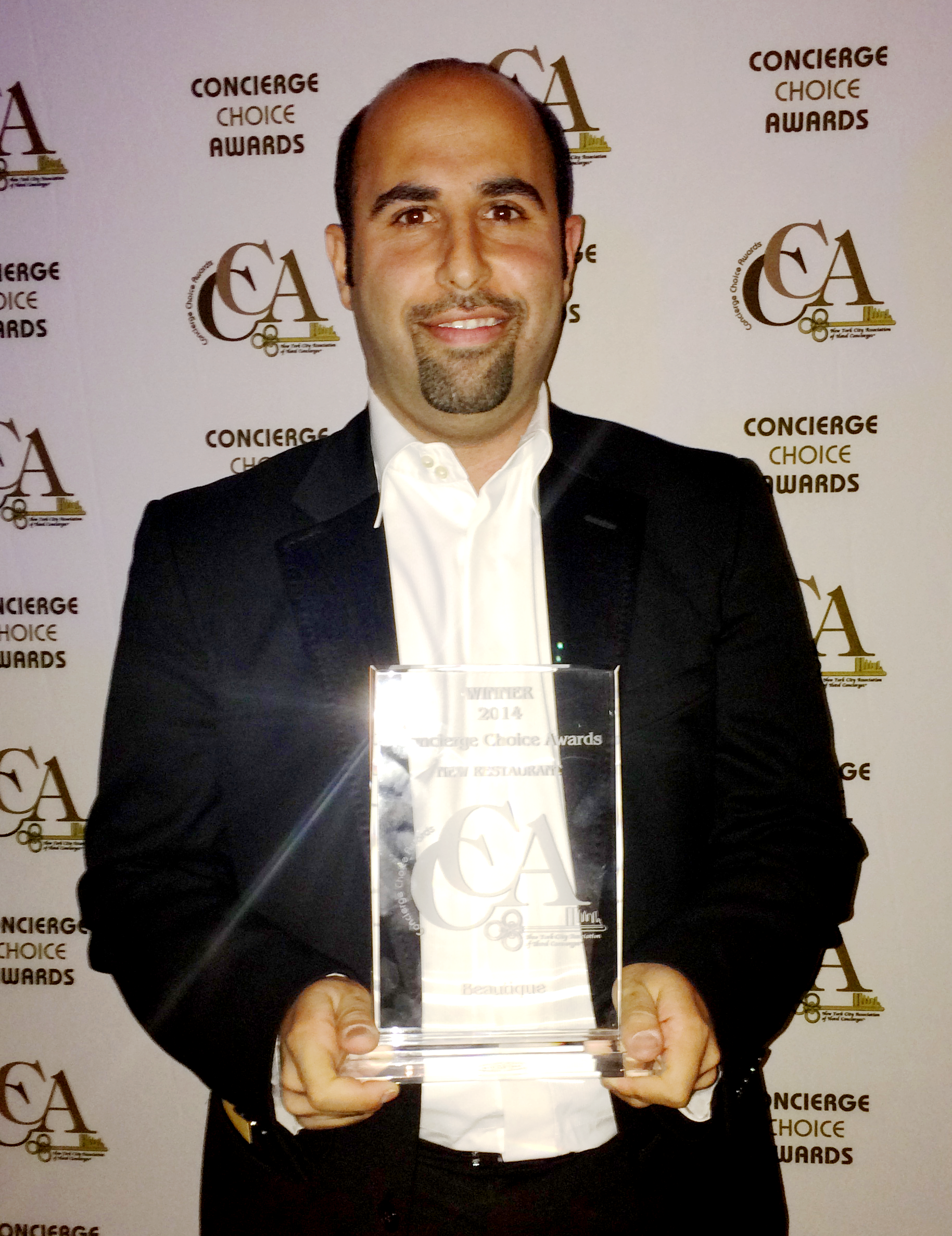
- Receiving the Best New Restaurant Award at the Concierge Choice Awards (2014)
- Education: Bachelor's degree, New York University
- Occupation: Restaurateur
- Website: jonbakhshi.com

Jon Bakhshi (often referred to simply as Jon B.) is an American restaurateur based in New York City. He has founded numerous restaurants and lounges including Home, Guest House, and Greenhouse (one of the world's first eco-friendly clubs in Manhattan's SoHo neighborhood). His restaurant, Beautique, won the Concierge Choice Award for Best New Restaurant in New York City in 2014.

== Early life and education ==
Bakhshi was born into an Iranian Jewish family. He attended yeshiva growing up and describes himself as a practicing Jew. He attended and graduated from New York University with a bachelor's degree with aspirations of attending law school afterward. Instead, Bakhshi focused on his entrepreneurial career.

== Career ==
Bakhshi began his career as a club promoter. In July 2005, he entered the entrepreneurial field when he opened Home, a nightclub on West 27th Street in Chelsea, Manhattan. He opened a nearby companion club called Guest House in August 2005. Bakhshi's nightclubs distinguished themselves from other clubs in the area by maintaining less strict entry requirements. Guest House was open five days each week while Home stayed open for six days a week. In July 2009, Bakhshi closed both Home and Guest House.

In 2008, Bakhshi began construction on an eco-friendly SoHo nightclub, Greenhouse. Prior to opening, Bakshi held publicity parties for Greenhouse at the Cannes Film Festival, Sundance Film Festival, and Paris Fashion Week. The latter party was hosted by models Jessica Stam and Carmen Kass at Le Baron, a club in Paris. Bakhshi worked with architect, Antonio Di Oronzo, on the design of the Varick Street club. Greenhouse featured thick bamboo walls, LED lighting, sustainable uniforms for employees, wind-generated electricity, waterless urinals, and vodka served in recycled bottles. It featured two levels on which differing styles of music could be played simultaneously. The club was also the first LEED-certified nightclub in the United States. The club officially opened in October 2008. Bakhshi sold his interest in the club in 2011. It was later shuttered under new ownership, in 2014.

In October 2009, Bakhshi and celebrity chef, Todd English opened restaurant and nightclub Juliet Supperclub in Chelsea. The location featured a Mediterranean theme, with a menu designed by English. Bakhshi sold his interests in the location in 2010, and it was closed in 2012.

In April 2014, Bakhshi opened combination bar, restaurant, and lounge Beautique, on Manhattan's 58th Street. The establishment made headlines for the notability of some of its guests. Celebrities like Leonardo DiCaprio, Kate Bosworth, Dylan McDermott, and many others have appeared at Beautique. It won the Concierge Choice Award for Best New Restaurant in New York City in 2014.

In May 2015, Bakhshi opened a second Beautique location in The Hamptons at the Capri Hotel. That year, Bakhshi purchased Megu Japanese restaurants, operating locations in New York, at the Hyatt Dream Downtown hotel, with Top Chef alumni Francis Tariga-Weshnak, as well as in New Delhi, Moscow, Doha, and Gstaad.
