= Bakshy =

Traditional Turkmen and Khorasani musicians

The bakshy (Uzbek: baxshi, Turkmen: bagşy) are traditional Central Asian folk singers.

== Origin ==
Historically, bakshy referred to two profession: scribes literate in the Uyghur alphabet and shamans who doubled as musicians, given the role of music in healing and in celebrating weddings, births, and other important life events. When Islam replaced shamanism as the dominant religion of Central Asia, the spiritual role of the bakshy was taken over by Muslim mullahs, leaving only music and preservation of national poetry.

The bakshy may sing either a cappella or to the accompaniment of traditional instruments (primarily the dutar). The Turkmen bakshy tradition is closely related to the larger Turkic Ashik tradition.

== Etymology ==
The term bakshy, meaning "teacher", is of Sanskrit origin and came to the region with the spread of Buddhism. Buddhism was the religion of the ruling class prior to the arrival of Islam.

== See also ==
- Bakhshi
- Music of Iran
- Music of Turkmenistan
- Dutar
- Ashik
- Greater Khorasan
- Turkmen National Conservatory
