= Rohit Bakshi (neurologist) =

American neurologist and academic

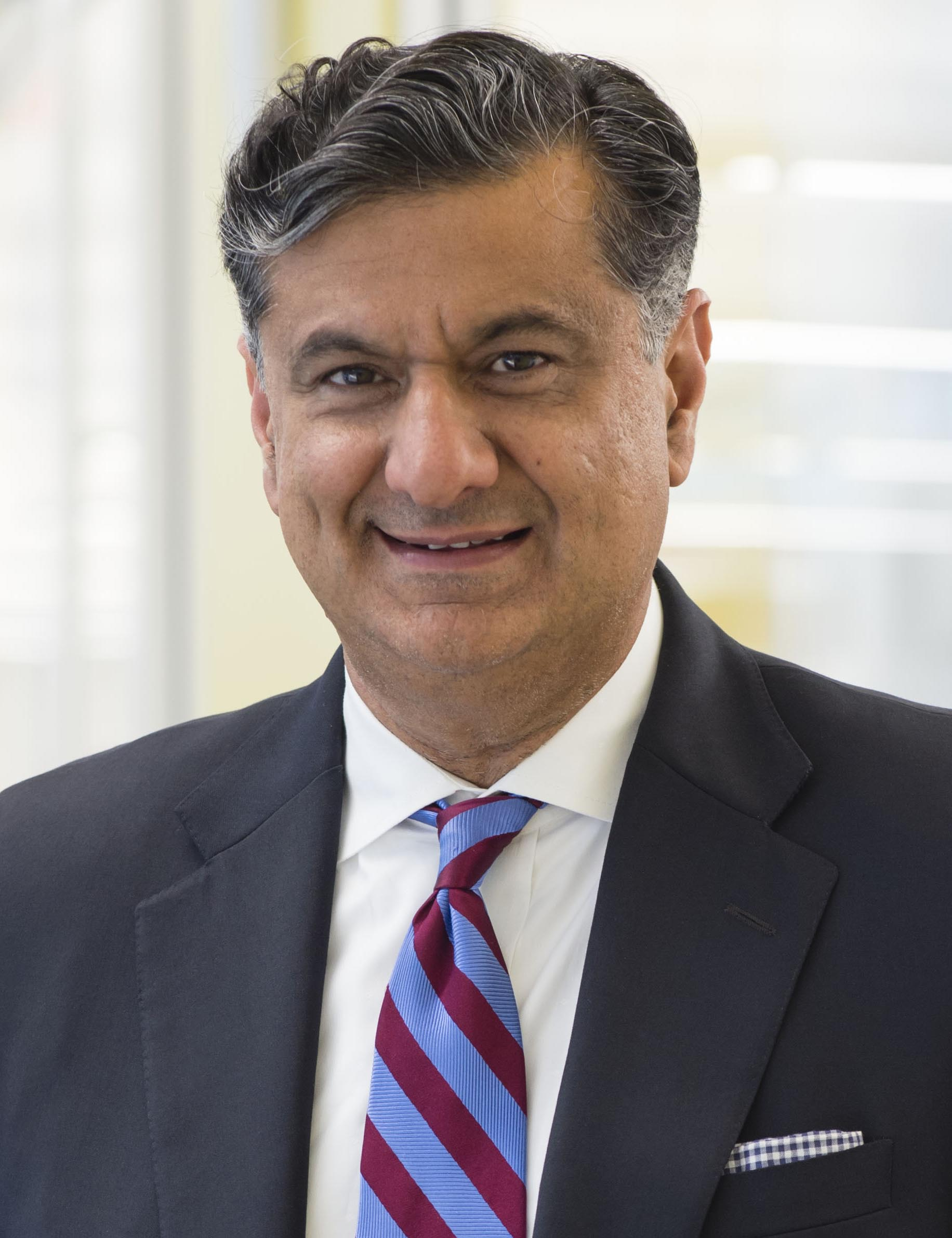
- Born: Buffalo, NY
- Education: M.D. degree
- Known for: Research on multiple sclerosis
- Scientific career
- Fields: Neuroimaging, neuroscience, neurology
- Institutions: Harvard Medical School
- Website: connects.catalyst.harvard.edu/Profiles/display/Person/47259

Rohit Bakshi is the Jack, Sadie and David Breakstone Professor of Neurology and Radiology at Harvard Medical School and a Senior Neurologist at Brigham and Women's Hospital. He is director of the Laboratory for Neuroimaging Research at the Brigham Multiple Sclerosis Center. Since 2015, he is editor-in-chief of the Journal of Neuroimaging.

He has built a research program involving quantitative MRI in MS through support from the National Institutes of Health, National Science Foundation and National Multiple Sclerosis Society.

He is a Buffalo native, graduate of Cornell University, and fraternity brother in the Iota chapter of Alpha Sigma Phi. As an Alpha Omega Alpha scholar, he completed a one-year neuroscience research fellowship with Dr. Alan Faden at the University of California, San Francisco. He served a one-year internship at the Massachusetts General Hospital and Harvard Medical School followed by a neurology residency at the University of California, Los Angeles, where he performed neuroimaging research with Dr. John Mazziotta. He then completed a neuroimaging fellowship at the Dent Neurologic Institute. He previously served as Neurology Residency Program Director and Neuroimaging Fellowship Program Director at the University at Buffalo-SUNY.

He received the 1998 William H. Oldendorf Award for neuroimaging research. He has served as Chair of the Neuroimaging Section of the American Academy of Neurology, President of the American Society of Neuroimaging, Associate Editor of the journal Neurotherapeutics, and Treasurer of the American Society for Experimental NeuroTherapeutics. He is a Fellow of the American Neurological Association and a Fellow of the American Academy of Neurology. In 2010, he received an honorary Master of Arts degree from Harvard University. In 2013, he was named to the Jack, Sadie and David Breakstone Endowed Chair at Harvard Medical School.

Dr. Bakshi has delivered more than 250 invited academic lectures and authored more than 300 peer-reviewed articles.

== Publications ==
- Brain and Spinal Cord Atrophy in Multiple Sclerosis, Nova Publishers, 2004, with Robert Zivadinov, ISBN 9781594541605
- ’’Serum lipid antibodies are associated with cerebral tissue damage in multiple sclerosis’’, Rohit Bakshi, Ada Yeste, Bonny Patel, Shahamat Tauhid, Subhash Tummala, Roya Rahbari, Renxin Chu, Keren Regev, Pia Kivisäkk, Howard L. Weiner, Francisco J. Quintana (January 27, 2016), DOI: https://doi.org/10.1212/NXI.0000000000000200
