= Azita Shariati =

Iranian-born Swedish business executive

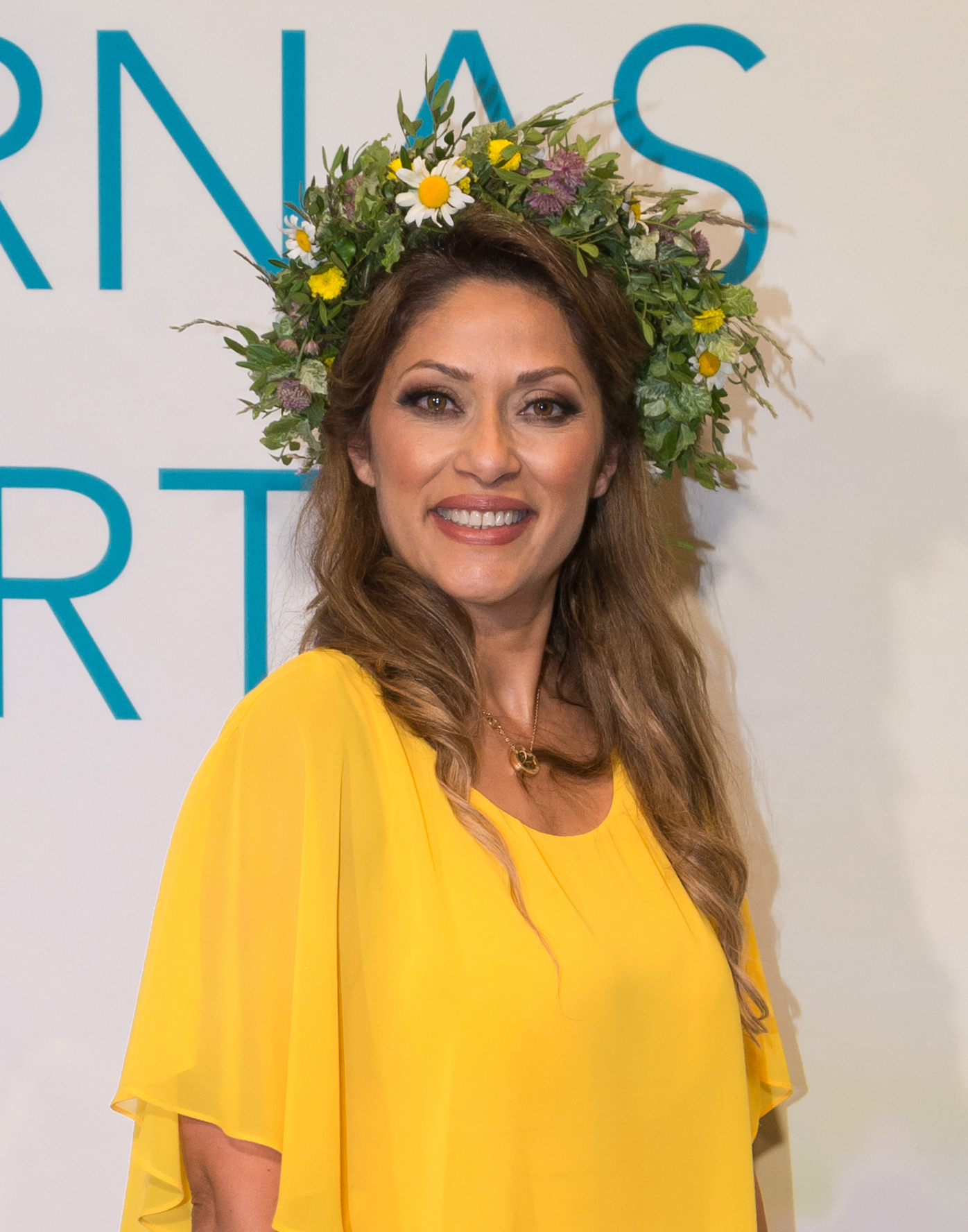
Azita Shariati in 2019

Azita Shariaty Khalil Abad (born 14 January 1968) is a Swedish business executive. Since 2014, she has headed the Swedish branch of the French catering and support services multinational Sodexo where she oversees operations for the Nordic countries. In February 2015, the Swedish weekly business magazine Veckans Affärer named her the most powerful business woman in Sweden.

== Biography ==
Born in Iran, Shariati flew to Gothenburg, Sweden, in 1988 to visit her boyfriend, Farzin Mirsaidi, a political refugee. She decided to stay, married her boyfriend (a municipal administrator in Sigtuna), and learned to speak Swedish. She studied food economics at the University of Gothenburg and took courses in statistics, leadership and marketing at the university's business school.

When her husband received a new appointment in Nynäshamn, the couple moved with their son to the Stockholm area. In 1998, she came into contact with Sodexo where she was first employed as a roving restaurant manager, replacing absentee managers. She rose quickly up the company's hierarchical tree, becoming district manager, regional manager, sales director, business area manager, manager for Sweden and finally managing director of Sodexo in Sweden and administrative director in Denmark.

In 2010, as Sodexo's country manager for Sweden, she launched a programme on gender equality, aiming for 50% of senior positions to be occupied by women. At the time, only 14% were women. By 2015, women represented 50% of the company's overall management and 46% of senior management. In an interview with Veckans Affärer, she explained she now wanted to concentrate on other areas of equality and inclusion, especially increasing job satisfaction so as to make Sodexo one of Sweden's best employers. She also intended to extend the company's interests, perhaps doubling the number of employees. She saw new opportunities in the company's cleaning operations which, for example, could be combined with more concern for patient care in hospitals. Another area she intended to impact was the reduction of food waste.

In August 2015, Azita Shariati was also listed as one of the top 20 women in business in northern Europe by the Nordic Business Report which described her as "a passionate advocate of gender balance and multiculturalism".

In June 2019 she accepted the position as Group CEO of AniCura, one of Europe's leading providers of veterinary care for companion animals. AniCura is a division of the US-based company Mars Petcare.
