= Azita Sahebjam =

Azita Sahebjam is an Iranian-Canadian ballerina and the director of Vancouver Pars National Ballet, which she established in 1990. She also acted in the movie The Neighbor directed by Naghmeh Shirkhan. In 2012, Sahebjam was a recipient of the Queen Elizabeth II Diamond Jubilee Medal.
