= Iranian folk music =

Music genre

Iranian folk music refers to the folk music transmitted through generations among the people of Iran, often consisting of tunes that exist in numerous variants.

The variance of the folk music of Iran has often been stressed, in accordance to the cultural diversity of the country's ethnic and regional groups. Musical influences from Iran, such as the ancient folkloric chants for group dances and spells directed at natural elements and cataclysms, have also been observed in the Caucasus.

Iran's folk, ceremonial, and popular songs might be considered "vernacular", in the sense that they are known and appreciated by a major part of the society, as opposed to the country's art music, which belongs for the most part to the intellectuals.

== Introduction ==
Folkloric items, such as folk-tales, riddles, songs, and everyday-life narratives, were collected through the discovery and translation of the Avesta, that is a collection of ancient Iranian religious texts. In classical Iran, minstrels (gōsān; huniyāgar) had a prominent role in the society. They performed for their audiences at royal courts and in public theaters. Ancient Greek historian Plutarch, in his Life of Crassus (32.3), reports that they praised their national heroes and ridiculed their Roman rivals. Likewise, Strabo's Geographica reports that the Parthian youth were taught songs about "the deeds both of the gods and of the noblest men".

The modal concepts in Iranian folk music are linked to those of the country's classical music. Many of Iran's folk songs have the potential of being adapted into major or minor tonalities, and Iranian singers of both classical and folk music may improvise the lyric and the melody within the appropriate musical mode. Experiments and influences from Iran's folk music have been incorporated into the musical appearance of tasnif, that is a type of vocal composition in Iranian classical music. Composers of the late 19th and early 20th centuries used the folk music of their native countries as a source of inspiration for their compositions. Iranian folk songs were incorporated into musical compositions that were produced within the parameters of classical Iranian modes, combined with western musical harmonies. Elements deriving from Iran's folk and classical music have been combined and used also in the pop music.

Iranian folk music is categorized in various themes, and includes historical, social, religious, and nostalgic contexts. There are folk songs that apply to particular occasions, such as weddings and harvests, as well as lullabies, children's songs, and riddles. The poetic meter of do-beyti ("two-couplet"), often sung in the Iranian vocal mode of āvāz-e dašti, is closely associated with Iranian folk tunes.

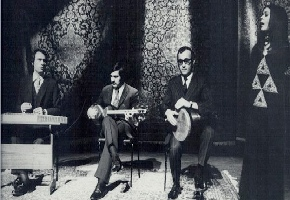
From left: Mohammad Heydari, Hooshang Zarif, Mohammad Esmaili and Parisa, 1976

Ru howzi, a musical comedy in Iran's traditional theater, involves loose paraphrases of stories from Iranian folklore and classical literature that are already known to the audience. The stories contain funny remarks that are improvised and indicate social and cultural concepts. Traditionally, ru howzi was performed on stages made of boards that were covered with rugs and were put on a small pool (howz) in the courtyard.

Musical instruments of various sorts are used in Iran's traditional music, some of which belong to specific groups. Three types of instruments are common to all parts of the country, namely sorna (karnay, zurna), ney (flute), and a doubleheader drum called dohol.

== Folk music specialists ==
Iranian folk musicians usually learn their art from their families. There are several types of traditional specialists of folk music in Iran, some of whom belong to specific ethnic and regional groups. Professional folk instrumentalists and vocalists (motreb) perform at formal ceremonial events such as weddings. Storytellers (naqqāl; gōsān) would recite epic poetry, such as that of Iran's long epic poem of Šāhnāme, using traditional melodic forms that are interspersed with spoken commentary, which is a practice found also in Central Asian and Balkan musical traditions. The bakshy (baxši), wandering minstrels who play the dotar, entertain their audiences at social gatherings with romantic ballads about warriors and warlords. There are also lament singers (rowze-xān), who recite verses that would commemorate the martyrdom of religious figures. and also there are many notable and top-notched scholars and ethnomusicologists who have studied on Persian folk music around different ethnicities to collect and analyze the Iranian folk music. Among them Morteza Hannaneh, Bahman Kazemi, & Mohammad-Reza Darvishi have had a deep authentic researchers on Iranian folk music.

== Notable works ==
Many of Iran's old folkloric songs were revitalized through a project developed by the Institute for the Intellectual Development of Children and Young Adults, a cultural and educational institute that was founded under the patronage of Empress Farah Pahlavi of Iran in 1965. They were produced in a collection of quality recordings, performed by professional Iranian vocalists such as Pari Zanganeh, Monir Vakili, and Minoo Javan, and were remarkably influential in Iran's both folk and pop music productions.

In 1997, the American jazz fusion ensemble Pat Metheny Group released an album named Imaginary Day that contained inspirations from the folk music of Iran. The album was awarded a Grammy Award for Best Contemporary Jazz Album in 1999.

In 2006, prominent musicians Hossein Alizâdeh and Djivan Gasparyan produced a collaborative album of traditional Iranian and Armenian songs named Endless Vision, originally recorded at the Niavaran Palace of Tehran. It was nominated for a Grammy Award for Best Traditional World Music Album in 2007.

In 2007, Baluch folklore vocalist Mulla Kamal Khan was awarded at a ceremony by grand master of traditional Iranian music Mohammad-Reza Shajarian for his contribution to the folk music of Iran's southeastern region of Baluchestan.

== See also ==
- Armenian folk music
- Assyrian folk/pop music
- Azerbaijani folk music
- Kurdish music
- Luri music
- Music of Iran
- Afsaneh Ballet
- Lloyd Miller
