= Din Mohammad Zangshahi =

Iranian Baloch musician (1958-2018)

Din Mohammad Zangshahi دین‌محمّد زنگشاهی
- Birth name: Din Mohammad
- Also known as: Zangshahi
- Born: 1958
- Origin: Balochistan, Iran
- Died: August 4, 2018 (aged 59–60)
- Genres: Folk music, Balochi music
- Occupation: Musician
- Instrument(s): Ghaychak, Ney

Din Mohammad Zangshahi (Persian/Balochi:دین‌محمّ; 1958-2018) was an Iranian Baloch especially versed in playing Ghaychak.

Zangshahi was born in Balochistan, Iran. He was one of the musical sources of the border region in northern Balochistan and one of the few musical artists in the regions of Iran who wrote a book and recorded parts of his works and poems related to Balochi sounds and songs in "Music of Balochistan".

Zangshahi died on 4 August 2018 due to long-term liver disease in Mirjaveh Hospital at the age of 64.
