= Shir-Mohammad Espandar =

Iranian musician (1927–2026)

Shir-Mohammad Espandar شیرمحمد اسپندار
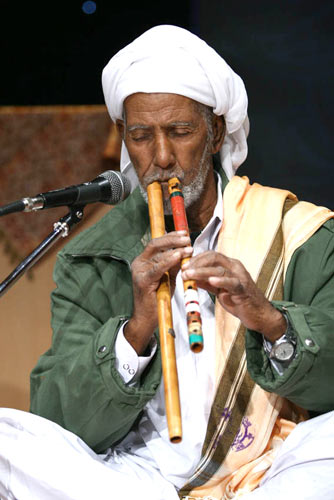
- Shir-Mohammad Espandar playing donali

Background information
- Also known as: Espandar
- Born: Shir-Mohammad; 1927
- Origin: Bampur, Balochistan, Persia
- Died: 22 July 2026 (aged 98)
- Genres: Folk music, Balochi music
- Occupation: Musician
- Instruments: Donali, Ney
- Years active: c. 1951–2026

Shir-Mohammad Espandar (Balochi/Persian: شیرمحمد اسپندار; 1927 – 22 July 2026) was an Iranian Baloch donali player.

== Life and career ==
Shir-Mohammad Espandar was born in Bampur, Balochistan in 1927. As a teenager, he went to Karachi, British India (later Pakistan), and returned to Iran in 1958 after gaining experience in the field of music. He used ney to play Balochi music until 1983.

He gave many performances in France, Peru, and many other countries. He obtained an honorary doctorate in traditional music from France and an honorary diploma in musicianship in Iran. His status as the first donali musician has been memorialized in the Tehran Museum.

Espandar died on 22 July 2026, at the age of 98.

== See also ==
- Donali
- Balochi music
- Iranian folk music
