= Zahirok =

Zahīrōk (Balochi:زهیروک) is one of the musical forms of Balochistan and the Baloch people, especially in southern Balochistan region of Makran. The genre expresses deep feeling and strong emotions about separation.

In the beginning, Zahirok was only sung by two groups of Baloch women.

Some Balochs often believe that zahırok is the basis of all Balochi music and the essence of the melodies used in singing Balochi narrative song.

Zahırok is one of the most important and well-known Balochi song genres, often described as the “Balochi classical music” by the Baloch themselves.

== Etymology ==
The term "Zahirok" refers to burning with longing which literally translates into “a melancholic song or a song of separation. it is about loss or absence (especially of distant loved ones) and a general term for several melody types used in narrative song performance.

== Features ==
A zahirok always begins with cihal, which is followed by a small number of lines, some of which are normally repeated.

Every zahiroks has a beginning section called a "picking up" (çistkanag) and a rising section called a "carrying up" (burzā barag). Once. the zahīrok has reached its "peak" (burzī), the pahlawān and/or surozī must "bring it down" (erārag) in a prescribed manner in order to conclude or "kill" (kuşag) the zahīrok.

Zahirok is performed by male singers and played by donali, Suroz and ghaychak.
