= Chaap =

Baloch folk dance

- Native name: چاپ (Balochi)
- Genre: Folk dance
- Instrument(s): Sorna, Dohol, Nar Sur, Suroz, Naal, Taboora

Chaap (Balochi: چاپ, lit. 'Clap') is a traditional folk dance of Baloch people in Balochistan. Chaap dance is performed in circle with a rhythmic clapping. It is also identified by the number of claps in a recurring grouping (do chapi, say chapi, char chapi).

== Background ==
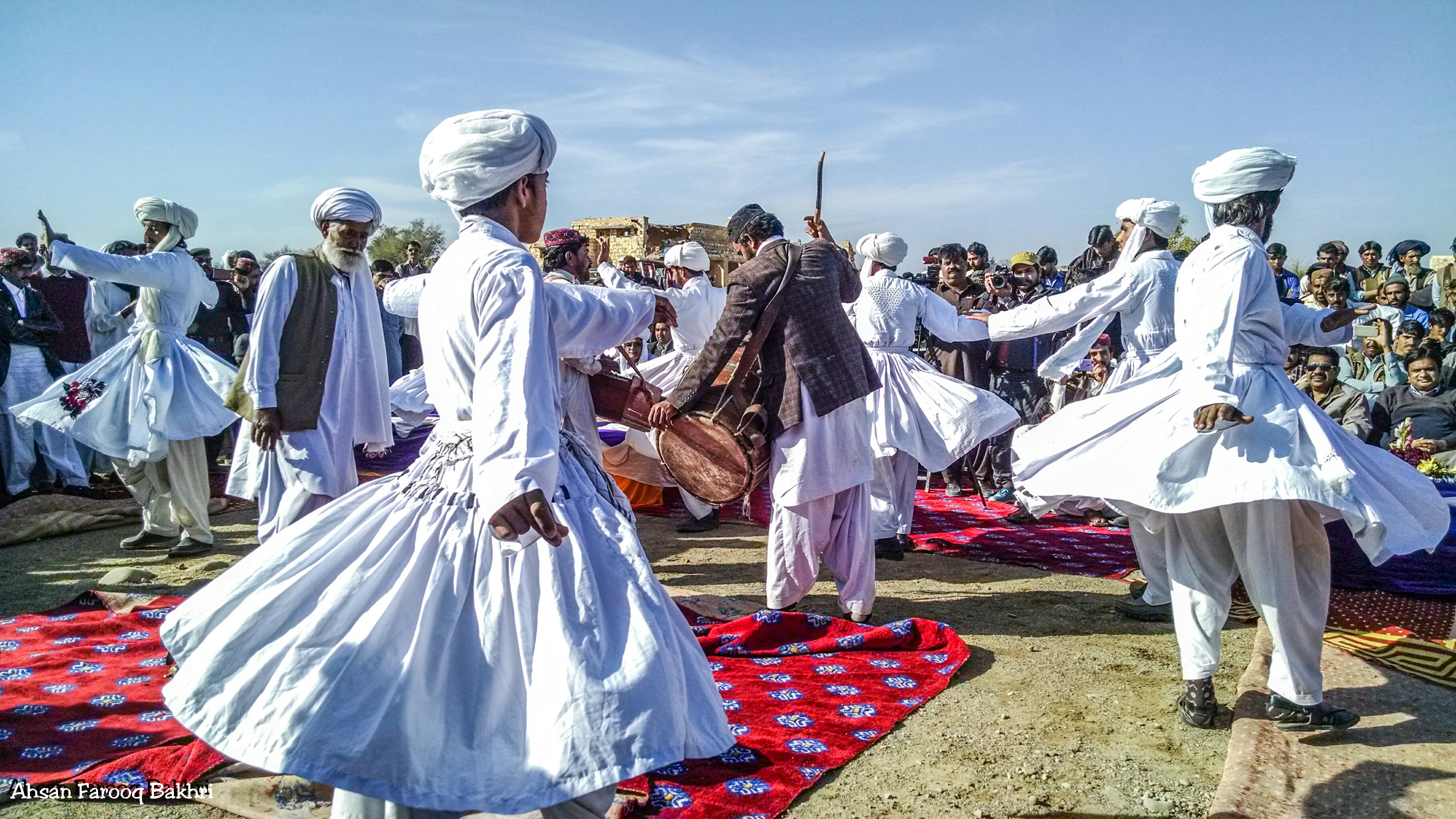
Baloch dance performed by graduates of a folk dance academy, Tehran, Iran; 1975

Chaap is a Balochi word which means clapping, and the dance is called nach in Balochi.

Most Balochi dances include clapping ("chaps").

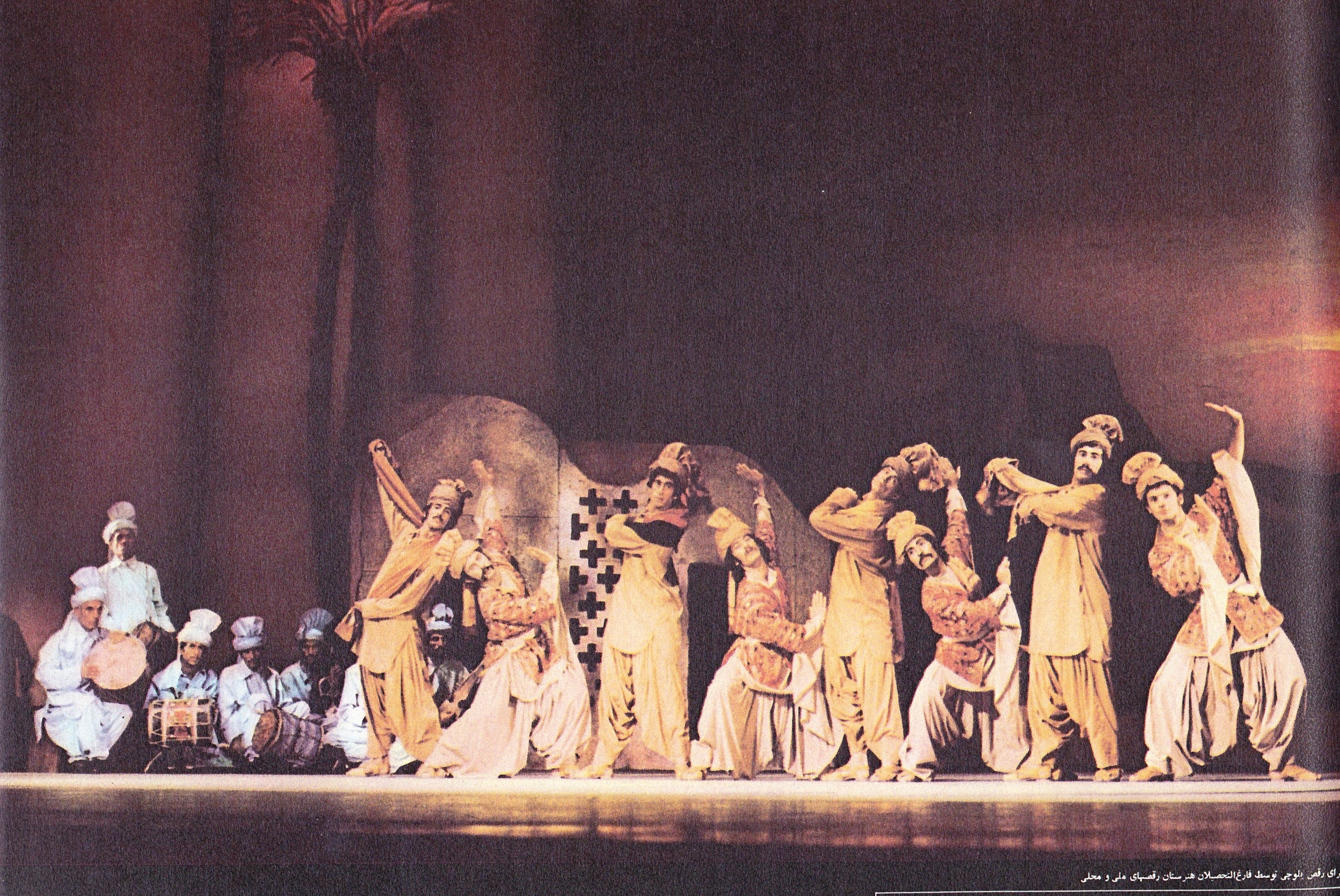
Baloch dance performed by graduates of a folk dance academy, Tehran, Iran; 1975

Every dance include unique style of clapping with different body movements in the circle. Balochi dances are performed separately by men and women in a large circle while dancing together whilst clapping.

Various types of chaap include Balochi lewa, hambo, and latti. Chaap is often performed while musical instruments play Balochi music, these instruments include Nar Sur, Suroz, Naal, and Taboora are played.

== Do Chapi ==
Do Chapi (دو چاپی) is a Balochi dance mostly performed by forming a circle by a group of people, dancing and clapping. and some cases sticks or swords.

It mostly performed by forming a circle by a group of people, dancing and clapping. Do chapi almost always includes sorna and dohol.

Women's dancing is different from men's, due to the fact they walk two steps behind during the dance and repeat their steps with a slight movement in a circle while clapping.

== See also ==
- Baloch clothing
- Baloch cuisine
- Balochi music
