= Abdul Sattar Baloch =

Baloch musician

Abdul Sattar Baloch or Ostaad Abdul Sattar Baloch (Balochi: استاد عبدالستار بلوچ) (c. 1951–2006) was a Baloch nationalist vocalist and musician.

He was the son of a Bampuri Iranian Baloch nationalist who escaped from Iran during nationalist tension in the late 1960s and settled in Pakistan where he attracted a large fan base to his music. His first entree into the music world occurred in the early 1970s.

His passion and main objective has always been to be the voice of his people's sentiments and their plight. He is known as a revolutionary music icon among Balochs. He and his colleague Ostaad Shafi recorded the most iconic pieces of Baluchi nationalist music such as "Del kantte faryad" or "My heart crying "and "Kasanoken Askalok jangala tarit" or "Little Askalok (girlish name) walking the forest."

In 2000, he had his first foreign concert in Sweden which was welcomed by Sweden's Baloch community and hundreds of his fans. At the same time because of his concerns about the future of Balochi language and balochi music he opened a music club to transfer his knowledge of music to young generation.

He died in 2006 in Lyari, Karachi, Pakistan at the age of 55.

== See also ==
- Balochi music
