= Dammam (drum) =

Drum used by Shia Muslims in Iraq and Iran

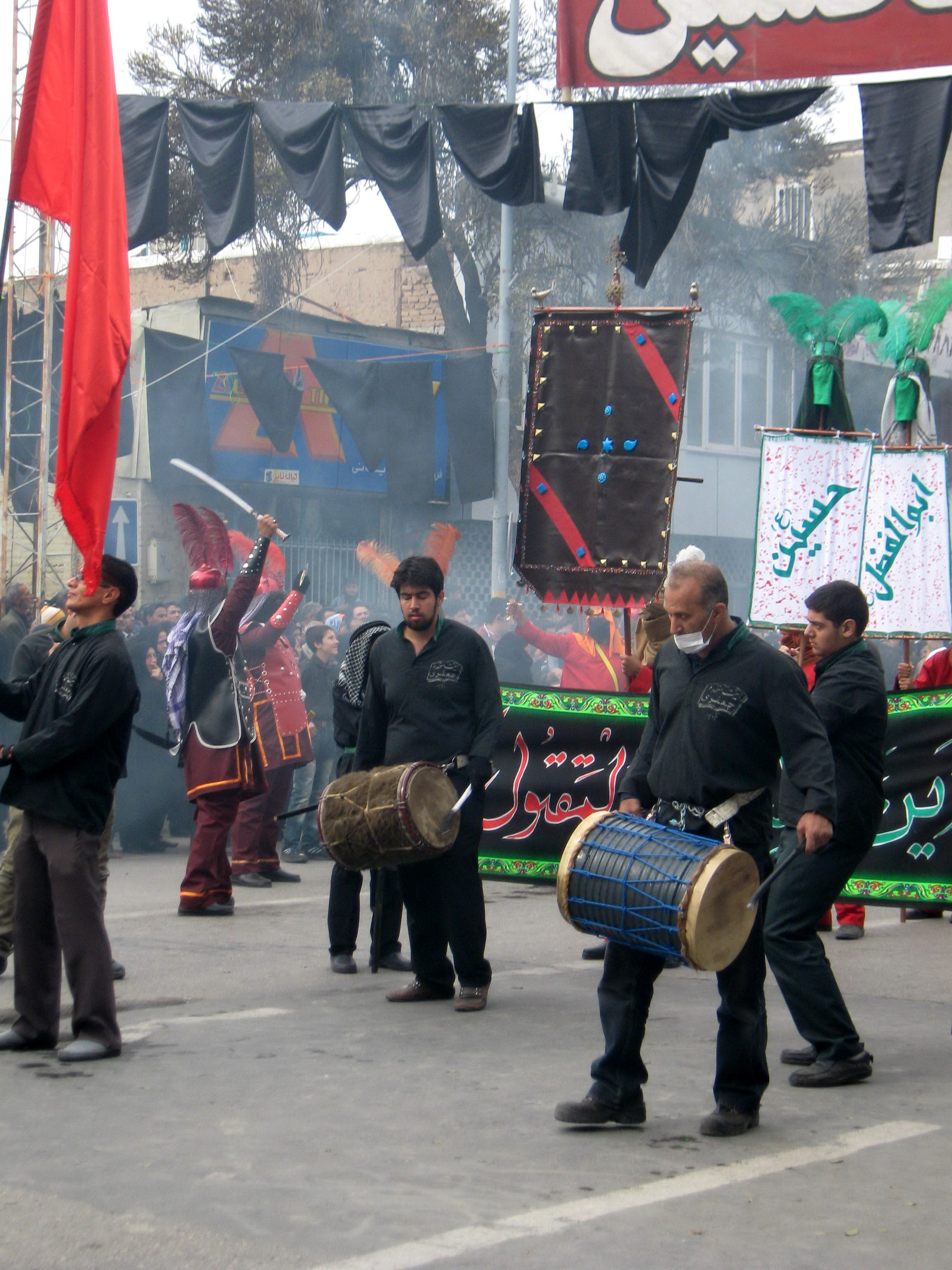
Passion play on 10 Muharram 1435 AH (November 13, 2013) in Nishapur, Iran.

The Dammam ( Arabic الدمام, DMG al-dammām) is a large double-headed cylinder drum or frame drum played by Shias in Iraq and Iran in religious ceremonies. The dammām is usually struck with the left hand and a curved stick in the right hand, especially during passion plays in the mourning month of Muharram or to wake up the devotees early in the morning of Ramadan.

== Origin and distribution ==
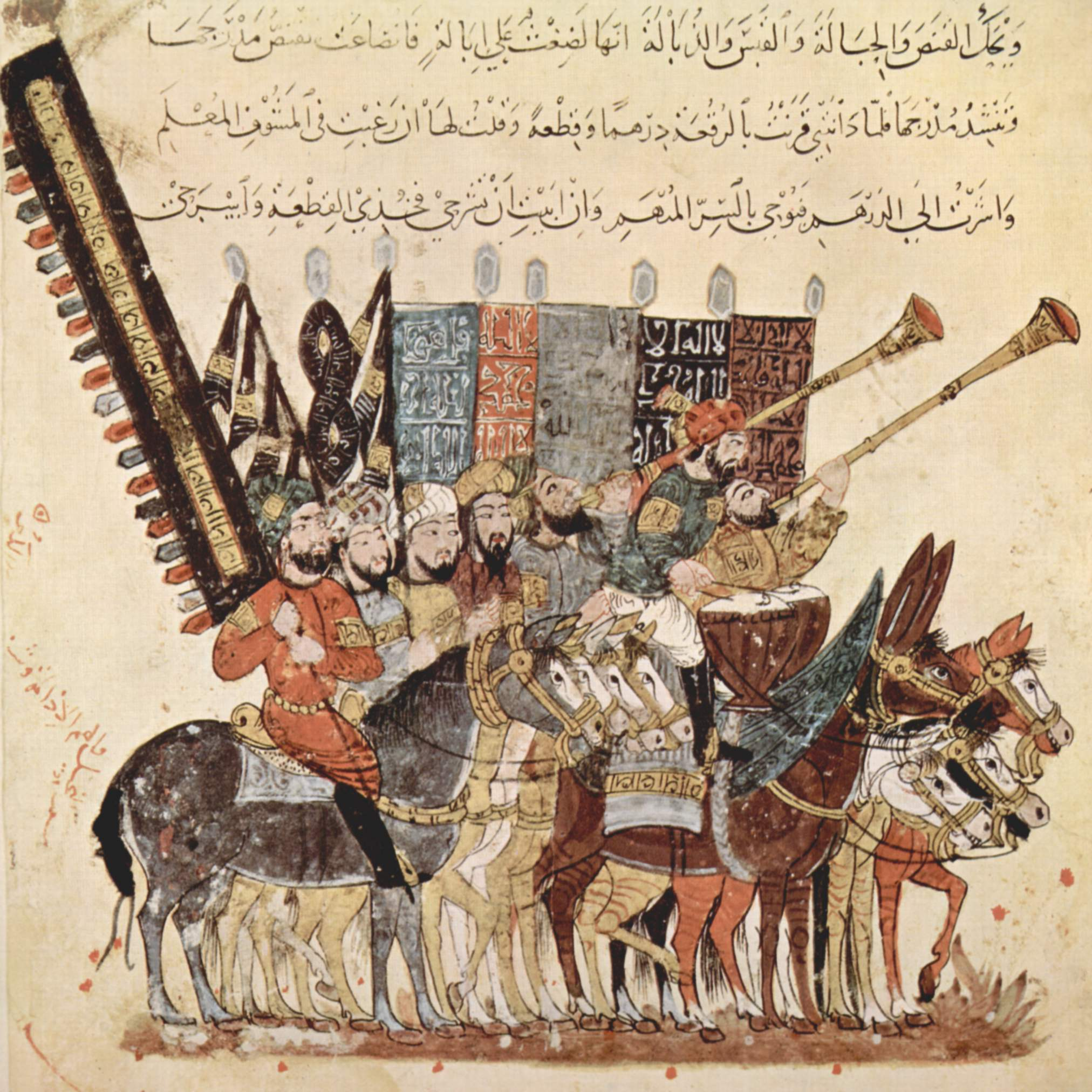
Two miniatures from Yahya ibn Mahmud al-Wasiti's manuscript Maqāmāt. In each illustration there is a set of drums, one tubular the other kettle drums.

Doubtful cylinder drums, worn by standing musicians on a belt around their hips and played with both hands, are illustrated as first known in the Middle East in the Neo- Assyrian period (first half of the 1st millennium BC). In Iraq, the dammām is one of the drums commonly called tabl, which can be tubular drums or kettle drums. Medieval authors only exempted the flat frame drums (duff) from this classification. The grammarian al-Mufaddal ibn Salama (died around 904) mentions the single-skinned beaker drum in addition to the two-skinned cylinder drum tablkabar (precursor to today's darbuka) and the dubious hourglass drum kūba. Cylindrical drums, together with the small pair of kettle drums naqqāra (pl. nuqqāirāt), the medium-sized kettle drum kūs (pl. kūsāt ), gongs (tusūt), bells (dschalādschil) and various wind instruments belonged to the medieval military bands, which were up to 40 strong and were used to represent the ruler. The instrument's are illustrated in the painter Yahya ibn Mahmud al-Wasiti's miniature illustrations from 1237 in Baghdad, in the manuscript Maqāmāt ("Assemblies") of al-Hariri.

In today's classical Iraqi music (maqām repertoire), the "Baghdad ensemble" (al-schālghī al-baghdādī) plays to accompany the song with the melody instruments santūr (dulcimer) and jūza (four-string spiked fiddle with coconut resonator) as well as the rhythm instruments tabla (name of the Goblet drum darbuka), duff (frame drum), and naqqāra (pair of kettle drums). Cylindrical drums do not appear in classical music. In folk music, various drums are used to accompany singing and dancing, such as the double-headed round frame drum tabl, which tabl al-ardah means when it is used for the Arab group dance of men, ardah, cultivated in southern Iraq. Throughout the country, the ensembles tabl wa surnā (“drum and bowling oboe”) are on the move for festive entertainment, which correspond to the ensembles davul – zurna in Turkey and the ensembles davul – zurna in the Balkans and tapan – zurla.

The same types of drums—frame drums, goblet drums, kettle drums, and cylinder drums—are also found in Iranian music. Barrel drums, hourglass drums and large kettle drums known from pre-Islamic depictions probably disappeared from the Iranian Highlands after the 14th century. The barrel drum doholak survived in Balochistan, while all three drum types mentioned are widespread further east in India. On the other hand, the hand-played goblet drum tombak and the frame drum duff are essential to classical music in Iran .

The drums played with sticks in folk music are functionally differentiated from this. The sticks are usually bent at the end and wrapped with fabric. In addition to the dammām, drums used regionally in folk music include the large double-headed cylinder dohol (dhol in India) and small kettledrums played singly or in pairs. In addition to being a generic term for drums, tabl can mean a small cylindrical drum that is struck with sticks on both heads.

Dammāma used to be the name of a small double-headed drum in southern Iran, or a kettle drum. Another name for dammāma was dabdaba, and dabdabi used to be called the small cylinder drum doli in Georgia.

== Design ==
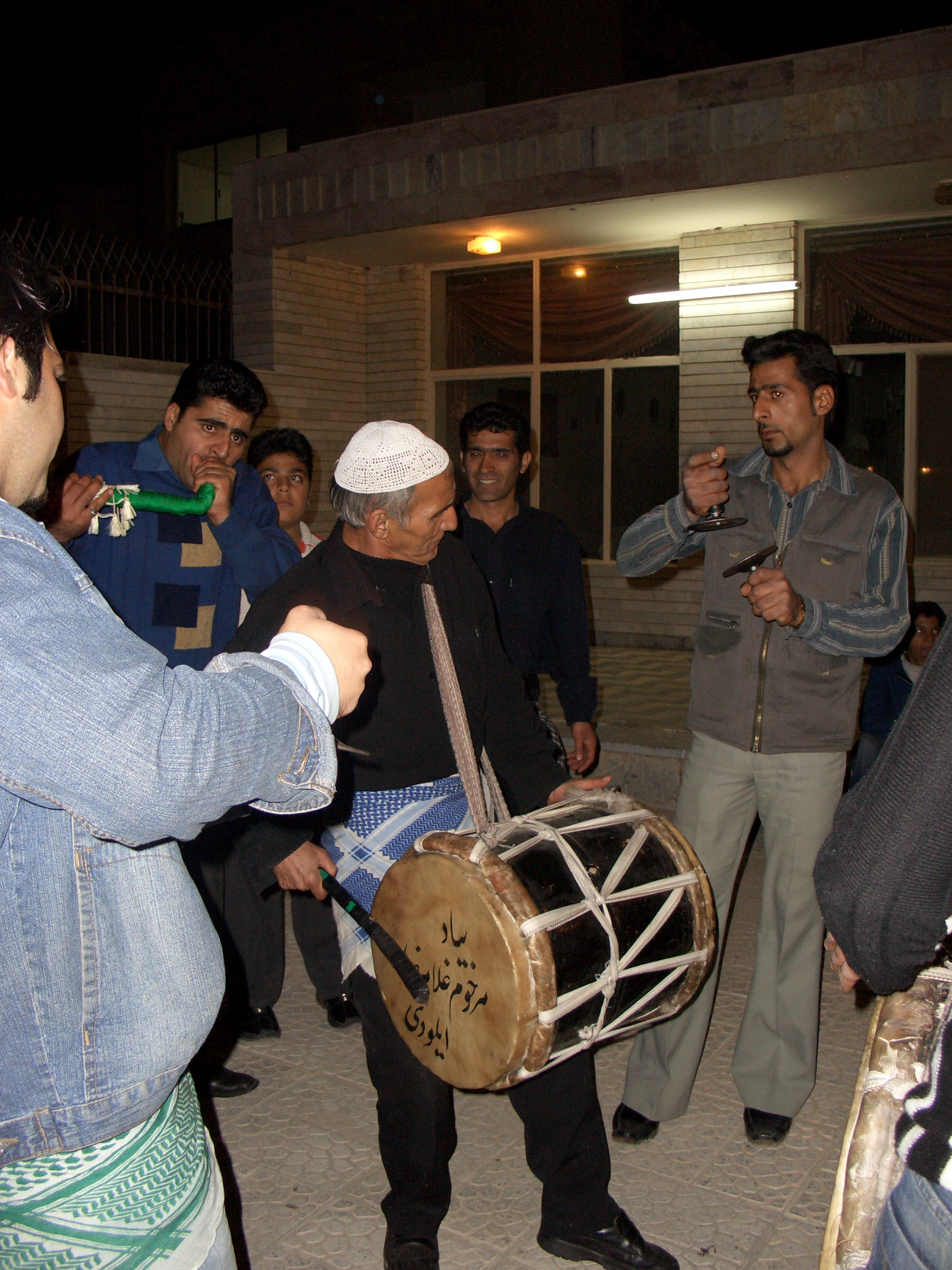
Dammām and zang in Iran

The body of the dammām consists of a thin-walled hollowed-out wooden trunk or a metal tube. The two skins made of goat skin are tied to thick palm fiber cords, which are tightened against each other by a continuous Y-shaped lacing. The size of the drum and the type of lacing are variable over a wide range. To change the drum sound, either the lacing is retied at its ends, or a secondary lacing placed across the middle is stretched taut. As with the bass drum, modern metal-bodied drums have clamping rings that are adjusted with clamping screws. The musician, who plays standing, holds the cylinder drum hanging on a strap over his left shoulder horizontally or slightly inclined to the left and below at hip height and hits the left skin with his hand and the right skin with a bent stick.

In the narrower sense, dammām, specified as ad-dammām al-mudala, denotes a large frame drum with a body height of only nine to twelve centimeters and a five, seven or octagonal shape. This drum hangs horizontally from a strap around the neck in front of the player's stomach, who hits it on top with a stick in his right hand. With his left hand he holds the drum by the frame or belt.

A similarly flat but smaller double-headed drum is the mirwas (plural: marāwīs) played in the Arabic countries on the Persian Gulf to accompany songs – including in the urban singing style sawt.

== Gameplay ==
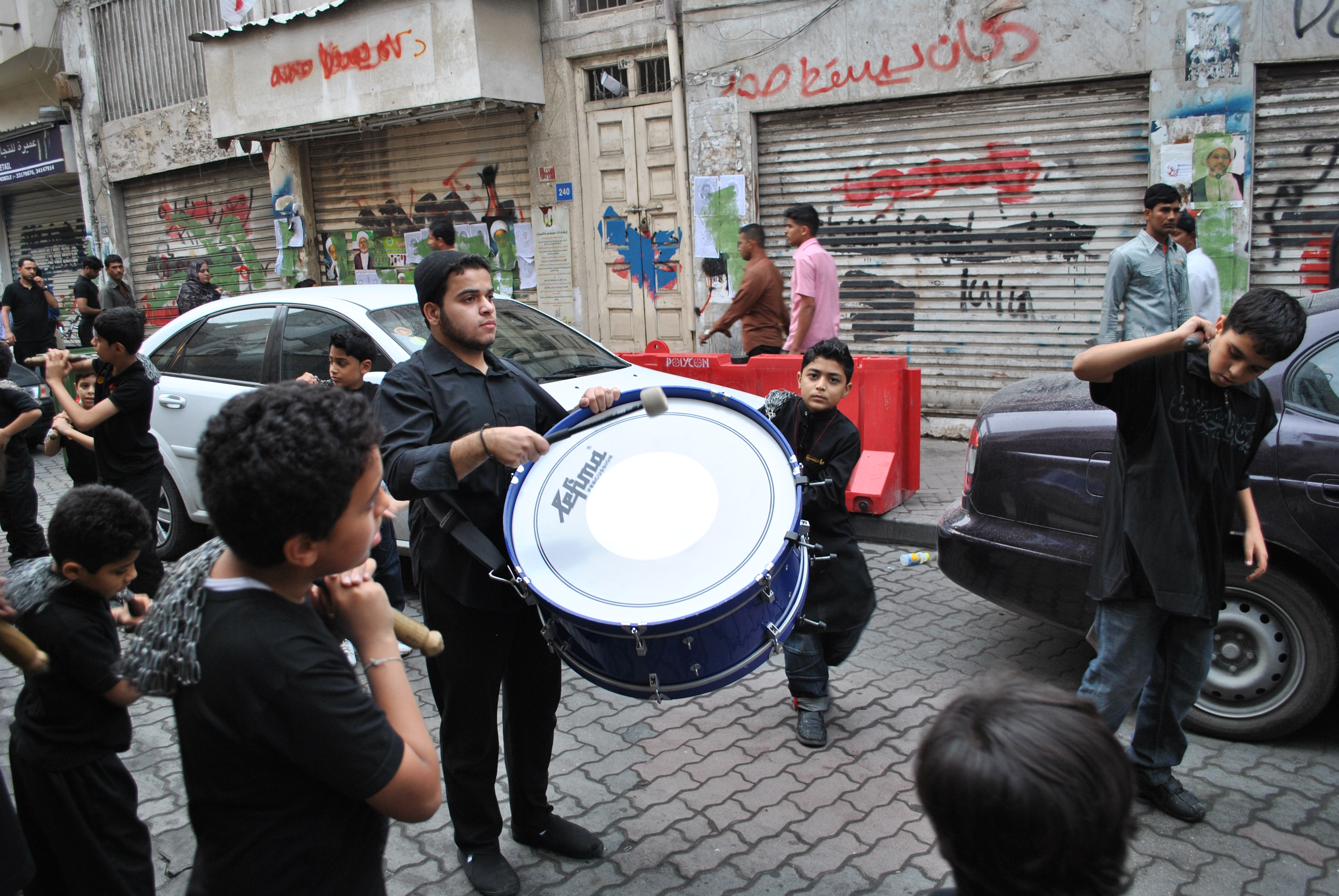
Modern drum with turnbuckles at an Ashura procession in Bahrain .

The dammām is primarily associated with the Ashura rites, in which groups of Shia men lament the martyrdom of Imam Husayn by carrying long knives on their heads or carrying a bundle of knife blades (zanjir) on their heads, accompanied by beating of drums, to inflict bloody cuts on the back. The latter are the zanjir zanan; Believers who hit their chests with their fists are called sineh zanan. Regionally, the knife blades are replaced by less damaging iron chains. For the believers, these flagellations are an expression of their grief and symbolic sympathy for the tragic fate of Husayn. Often several drums wrapped in green cloth and one or two paired cymbals (cymbals such as Persian zang, Arabic sandsch, zanj) are beaten while the men flagellate each other. If women are present, they observe what is happening from the side of the road.

In the northeastern Iranian city of Mashhad, one of the largest religious centers of Shiite Islam, believers from large parts of Iran come together on Ashura, the tenth day of the month of Muharram, and form a crowd that moves around the Imam Reza shrine, accompanied by acoustics of drums, paired cymbals and trumpets. In Bushehr on the Persian Gulf, it is part of the tradition of the ritual that takes place on the 9th of Muharram that a procession marches from all parts of the city, accompanied by a group of instruments with eight cylinder drums, eight paired cymbals and, instead of the trumpet, a traditional conical long trumpet buq (cf. buki). When the groups meet at a central location, it is up to the buq players to coordinate the rhythm with each other.

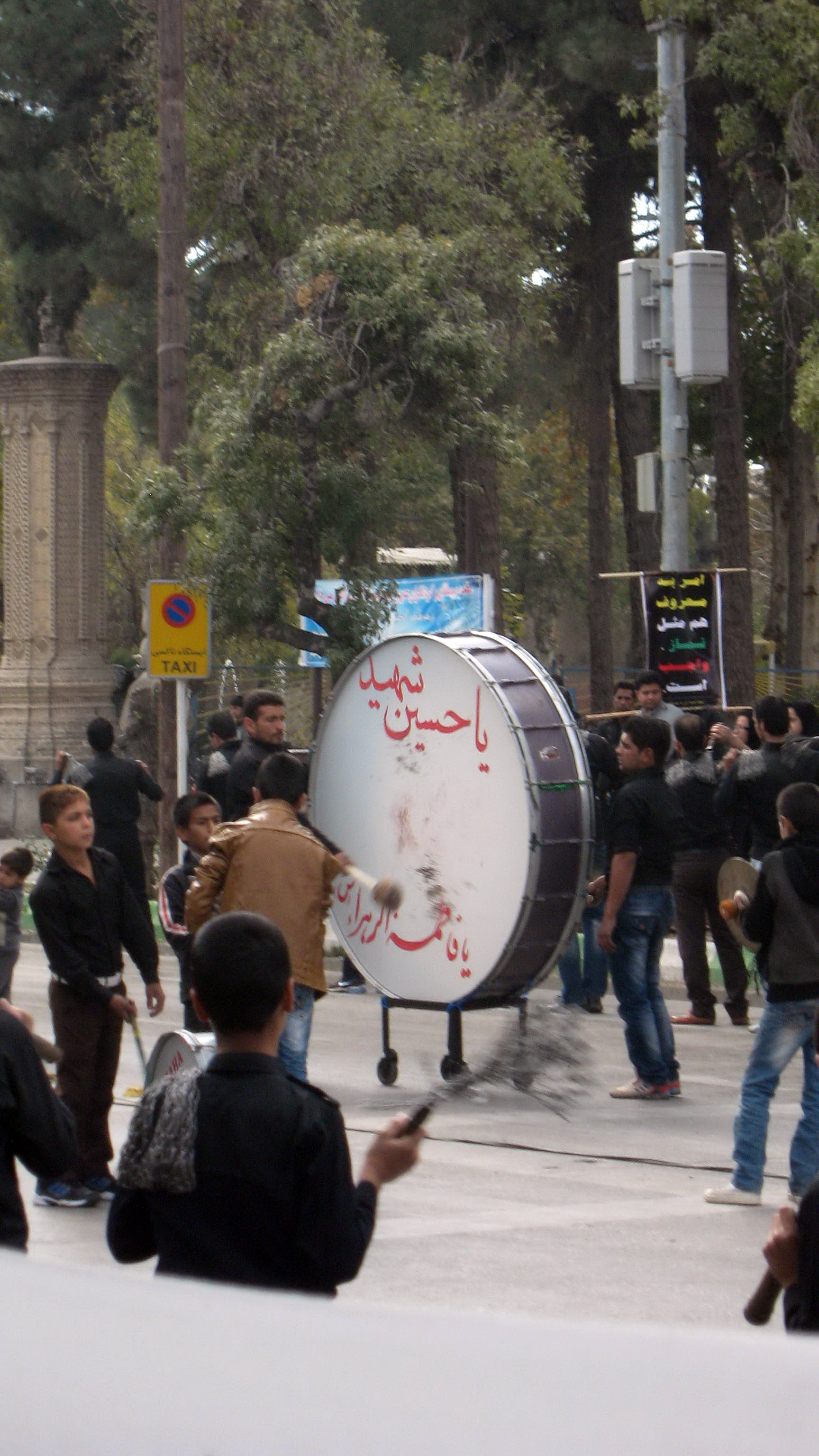
Oversized modern frame drum. Muharram in Nishapur

In passion plays ( taschābah ) in the first ten days of the month of Muharram, the historical events leading up to the death of Husayn are enacted with performers in costumes and horses in front of backdrops. A form of the passion play is ta'zieh . Each main character's characterization includes specific melody lines, rhythms, and musical instruments. Drums, cymbals and trumpets convey the atmosphere of the Karbala battlefield . In some places in Iran, drums were beaten as loudly as possible in a kind of religious competition to make one of the groups performing ta'zug appear even more impressive than other, opposing religious groups.

In addition, drumbeats can convey a strong emotional expression in very different emotional states. Due to this fundamental openness to interpretation, drums are suitable as diverse carriers of meaning in rituals; with the restriction that some drums may only be used for certain rituals due to a meaning ascribed to them. In India, the Shia events in the month of Muharram are not only maintained by the Shia community and some have the character of a public festival. Since at least the mid-19th century, Indian Muslims have used the flat kettle drum tasa and the large two-skinned tubular drum dhol as a pair of drums in the mourning ritual on Muharram (in India tatbir).

Some cultural forms of African immigrants and former slaves, especially dance and musical styles, have survived in southern Iraq and Iran in the Persian Gulf. In Basra, Iraq this includes the possession ceremony an-nūbān with relatively benign spirits, for which African drums and the tanbūra, also from Africa, are used. Another possession ceremony, originating from East Africa and common on both sides of the Persian Gulf, is zar. The damaging spirit, understood as a kind of wind, must at the zar-Healing ritual to be identified with his personality and country of origin. Colorfully dressed dancers also perform during the multi-day ceremony. In southern Iran, the participants speak Persian with Arabic and Swahili interspersed. In addition to the large dammām, the medium-sized drum gap dohol and the small kesar are also used.

In Bushehr there were a number of African singers who performed at family celebrations. African influence was also evident in the women's rituals of Muharram. Notably, until the mid-20th century, women in two mosques in Bushehr played the drum dammām. Also, until about this time on Muharram, they practiced sineh zanan, holding each other's shoulders and moving in circles like the men.

A documentary movie called "Dammâm" is available on Vimeo: |url= https://vimeo.com/867714959

== Literature ==
Scheherazade Qassim Hassan: Dammām. In: Laurence Libin (ed.): The Grove Dictionary of Musical Instruments. Vol. 2, Oxford University Press, Oxford/New York 2014, p. 11
