= Suroz =

Musical instrument

- Suroz and sārī
- Classification: stringed instrument
- Developed: Sindh

Related instruments
- dambūrag; surnā; ḍuhl; Gheychak; chang; nal

The suroz (Balochi: سُروز or سُرود) also called Surando (Sindhi: سُرندو) is a bowed string instrument with a long neck, similar to a fiddle or sarangi and played vertically. It is considered the traditional instrument of Balochistan and Sindh.

Suroz is a Balochi name of musical instrument played with the help of a fiddle.

The suroz/surando, is mostly performed with the damburag and usually play with the donali. Throughout Balochistan and Sindh, suroz is a traditionally instrument and it is played performed by baloch and Sindhi musicians.

The Soruz/Surando is popular instrument amongst craftspeople, folk artists, folk musicians and dance groups.

Although originally native to Sindh, Baloch people later adopted it and make this instrument in Eastern and Western Balochistan (Pakistan, Iran) and Nimroz province of Afghanistan. It is the way to portray their rich culture and their affectionate towards music.

== Construction and play ==
It has three or four main strings for playing which are tuned 1. low E - 2. low A - 3. a (440 Hz) - 4. e. Strings one, two and four are made of steel while string three is made of thick gut. there are five to eight sympathetic strings, made of thin steel and tuned according to the raag to be played. The playing strings are some millimeters higher on the bridge than the sympathetic strings, so that the latter cannot be touched by the bow. The strings are not played like on the sarangi by pressing them with the nails, but by touching them with the fingers, but without pressing them onto the neck.

The highest two strings are mostly fingered. The player uses the highest string up to an octave. The sound is very close to the Nepalese sarangi. In the south of Baluchistan there are smaller surozes, there the length of the playing strings is about 33-35 cm. In the north and in Sindh, the surozes can be much bigger, up to a string length of 45 cm. There the tuning is somewhat lower.

== Cultural significance ==
Suroz is the preferred accompaniment instrument for zahirok.

The Baloch term for both music and musical instruments is sāz and the term for the player is sāzī. Within the Baloch culture until modern times, the caste associated with playing the suroz would be the ludi caste. Members of the caste would learn to play this instrument from their families because the art of instrumental music was considered a hereditary profession, as such upper caste Baloch would not be associated with the instrument. Recently members of both lower and upper social caste can be seen owning or playing the instrument.

== Exponents ==
- Rasool Bakhsh
- Karim Bukhsh
- Mohammed Shakir
- Umar Surozi
