= Ghijak =

Musical instrument

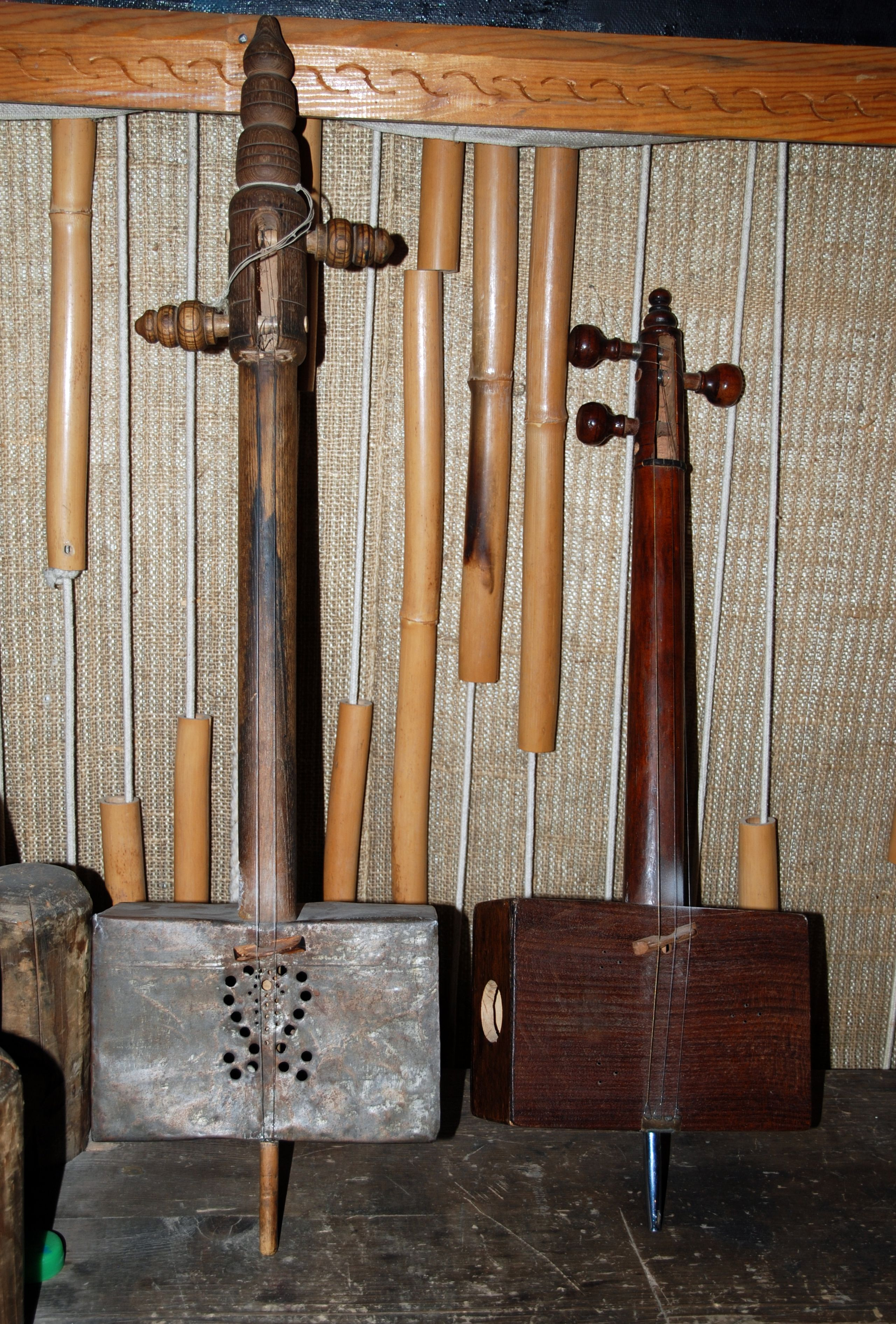
- Classification: Bowed string instrument

Related instruments
- Kamancheh

The ghijak (Note: English: /ɡɪˈdʒæk/ gih-JAK; Persian: غیجک، غیژک, romanized: ghijak, ghizaak, cyrillized: ғижжак; Shughni: غیږک, romanized: ɣiɣ̌ak; Turkmen: гыжак, romanized: gyjak; Kyrgyz: кыяк, romanized: kyiak; Uyghur: غېجەك, romanized: ghëjek; Chinese: 吉孜哈克; pinyin: jízīhākè; Dungan: гиҗак; Cantonese Yale: gātjīngahphāk; Russian: гиджак, romanized: gidžak) is a group of related spike fiddles, used by Afghans, Uzbeks, Uyghurs, Tajiks, Turkmens, Qaraqalpaks and in the Xinjiang province of western China. Despite the similarity of the name, it is more closely related to the Persian kamancheh than the ghaychak.

== History ==
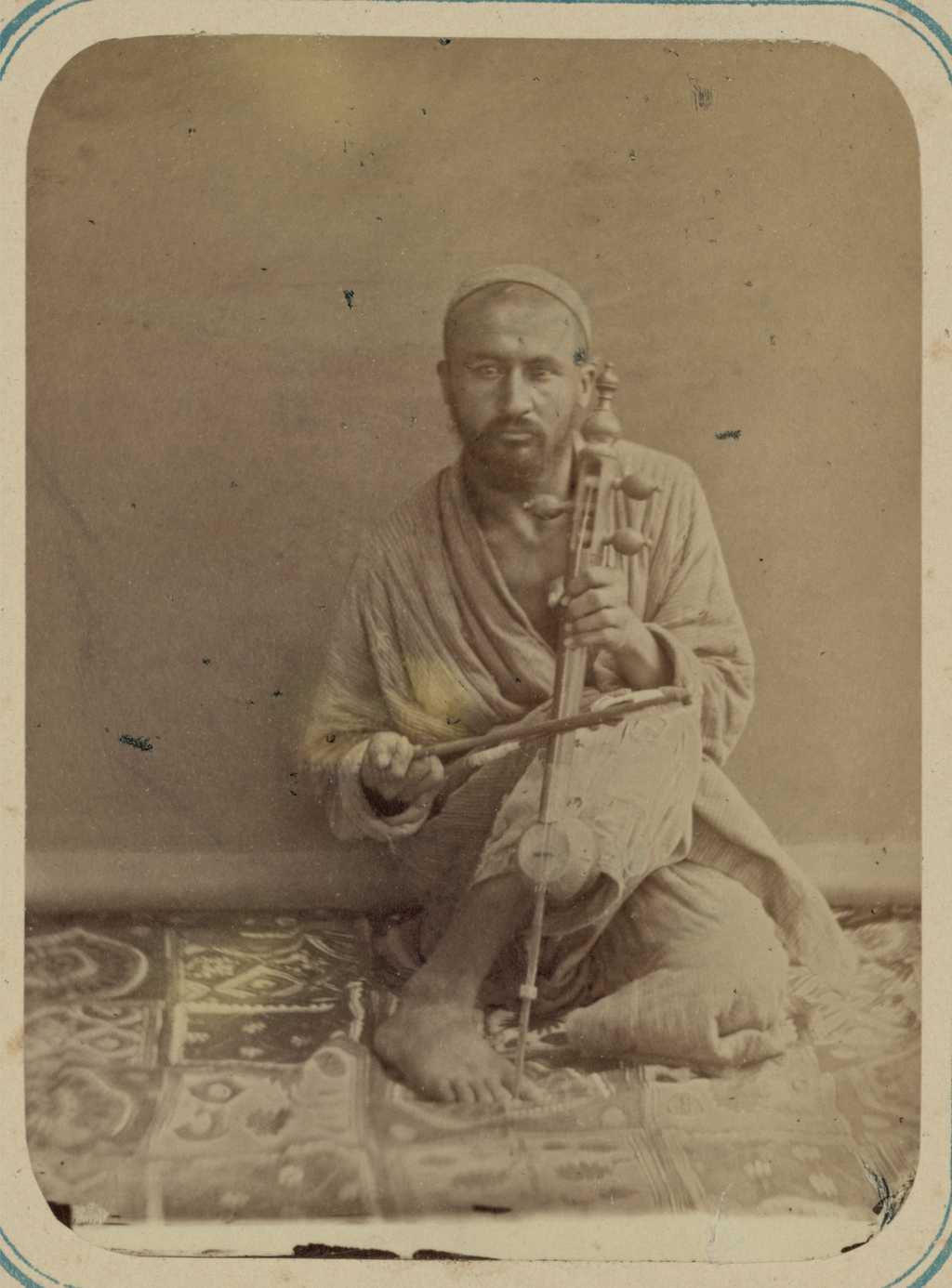
Gydzhak or Gʻijjak spike fiddles grim Russian Turkestan.

The instrument name appears in 10th-century manuscripts, which indicate that the bridge (harrak) was made of almond shells. The ghidjak as depicted in 15th-century Persian miniatures resembles the modern instrument in its construction.

== Xinjiang ==
The ghijek as it is used in Xinjiang has four strings, either with a bowl soundbox (similar to the kamancheh), or with a box soundbox often made from a tin can. One of Xinjiang's most prominent ghijek players is Akram Omar (艾克热木·吾买尔 / ئەكرەم ئۆمەر / Акрам Омар), from Kashgar.^{video}

== See also ==
- Ghaychak
- Kamancheh
