= Dohol =

Musical instrument

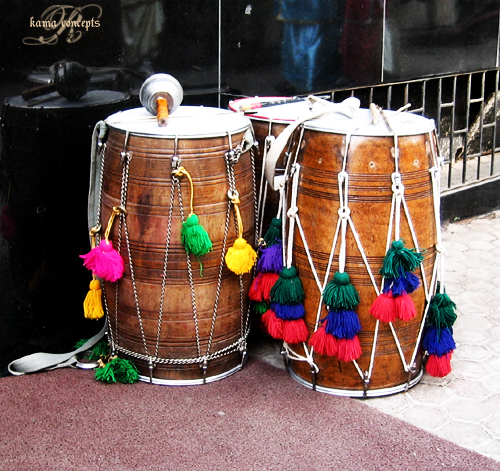
- Classification: Membranophone

Related instruments
- Tombak; Daf; Dammam (drum); Dhol

A dohol (Persian: دهل) is a large cylindrical drum with two skinheads. It is generally struck on one side with a wooden stick bowed at the end, and with a large thin stick on the other side, though it is also played with the bare hands. It is the principal accompaniment for the Sorna. A similar instrument, the Dhol, is used in traditional Egyptian, Pakistani and Indian music.

In Balochistan it mostly performed by forming a circle by a group of people, dancing and clapping. Do-Chapi almost always includes Sorna and Dohol.

dohol and Tombak play at baloch weddings in Muscat.

The dohol is largely played in Kurdistan with the zurna.

== In Iran ==
The dohol in Iran is mostly played in wedding ceremonies and other celebrations. The dohol is mostly played with a sorna.

== In Afghanistan ==
The dohol in Afghanistan is mostly played on special ceremonies such as wedding ceremonies. The "Surnay or Sorna" is mostly played with it. The Afghan dance Attan is traditionally performed with both the Dohol and Surnay.

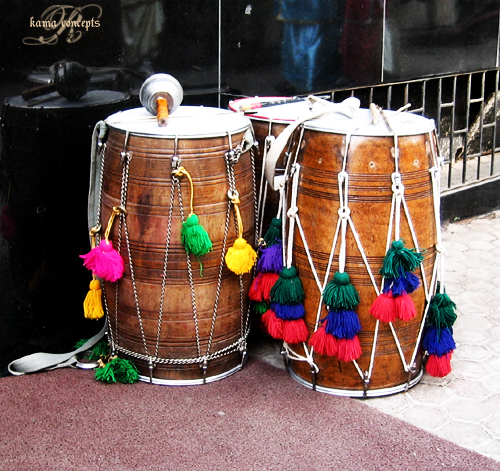
Dohol drums

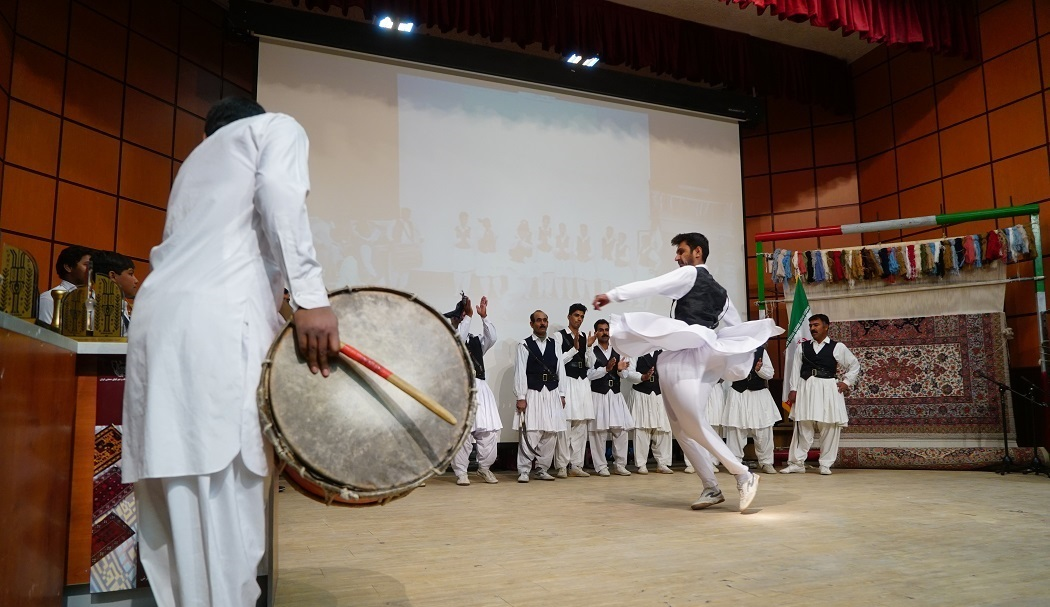
Baloch people performing a dance at the Zabol University

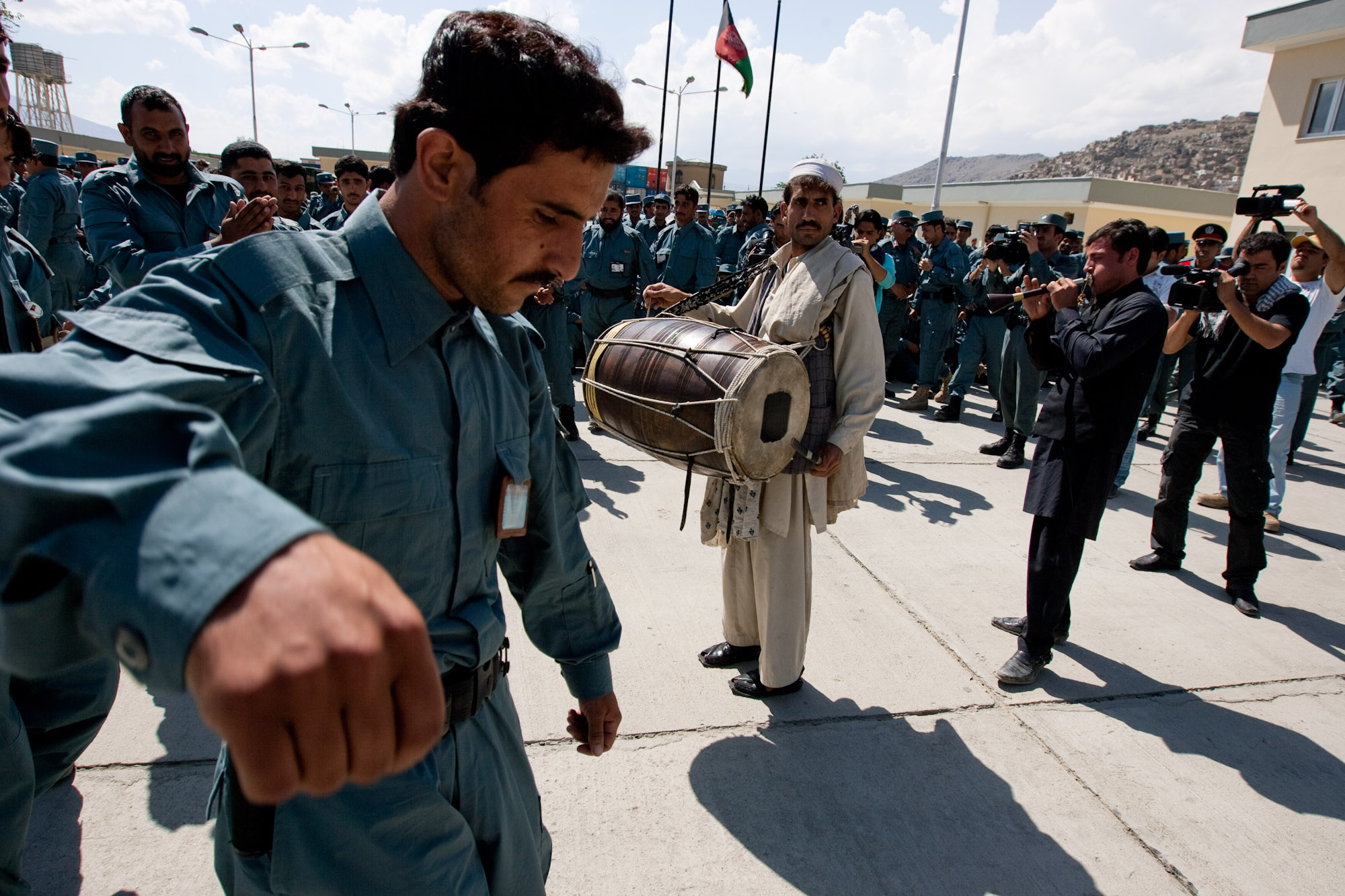
Afghan National Police performing the Attan dance with Dohol and Surnay

== See also ==
- Baluchi music
- War drum
