= Ashkutu =

Ashkutu اشكوتو
- Village
- Location within Iran
- Coordinates: 26°43′55″N 58°51′31″E
- Country: Iran
- Province: Kerman
- County: Qaleh Ganj
- Bakhsh: Chah Dadkhoda
- Rural District: Rameshk

Population (2006)
  - Total: 190
- Time zone: UTC+3:30 (IRST)
  - Summer (DST): UTC+4:30 (IRDT)

Ashkutu (Persian: اشكوتو, also Romanized as Ashkūtū; also known as Ashgetū, Ashkūtū”īyeh, Ashkūtū’īyeh, Oshkūtū’īyeh, and Oskotū) is a village in Rameshk Rural District, Chah Dadkhoda District, Qaleh Ganj County, Kerman Province, Iran. At the 2006 census, its population was 190, in 60 families. It is next to the Sistan and Balochistan province.
