= Balochistan =

Region of southwestern Asia

Coordinates: 27°25′N 64°30′E

Balochistan بلۏچستان
- Region
- The region of Balochistan (shown in dark green) on the globe
- Countries: Afghanistan; Iran; Pakistan
- Subdivisions: Iranian Balochistan, Pakistani Balochistan, Afghan Balochistan

Population (2013)
  - Total: c. 18–19 million

Demographics
  - Ethnic groups: Baloch; Minor: Brahui, Pashtuns, Hazaras, Jadgals, Sindhis, Tajiks, Sistanis, Persians, Khetrans
  - Languages: Balochi; Minor: Brahui, Jadgali, Pashto, Sindhi, Persian, Khetrani, Urdu
- Largest cities: List: (Pakistan) Kharan (Pakistan) Turbat (Iran) Zahedan (Pakistan) Khuzdar (Afghanistan) Zaranj (Pakistan) Uthal (Iran) Iranshahr (Pakistan) Dera Allah Yar (Pakistan) Sibi (Pakistan) Mauripur (Pakistan) Lyari (Pakistan) Kalat (Pakistan) D.M. Jamali (Pakistan) Dera Bugti (Pakistan) Gwadar (Iran) Chabahar (Pakistan) Nushki

Balochistan (Note: (/bəˈloʊtʃɪstɑːn, bəˌloʊtʃɪˈstɑːn, -stæn/ bə-LOHTCH-ist-a(h)n, -A(H)N; Balochi: بلۏچستان, romanised: Balòcestàn, [baˈloːt͡ʃest̪ɑːn]), also spelled Baluchistan, Balochestan, Baluchestan, and, especially on French maps, Beloutchistan or Baloutchistan; also Baloch Land or Baluch Land) is a historical region in West and South Asia, located in the Iranian plateau's far southeast and bordering the Indian plate and the Arabian Sea coastline. This arid region of desert and mountains is primarily populated by ethnic Baloch people. Balochistan is significant because of its strategic location, mineral wealth, long coastline along the Arabian Sea, the Gulf of Oman and potential for discoveries of oil and gas.

The Balochistan region is split among three countries: Iran, Afghanistan, and Pakistan. Administratively it comprises the Pakistani province of Balochistan; the Iranian province of Sistan and Baluchestan, along with southern Kerman province, southern South Khorasan province and eastern Hormozgan province; and the southern areas of Afghanistan, which include Nimruz, Helmand, and Kandahar provinces. It borders what was historically the Pashtunistan region to the north, Sindh and Punjab to the east, and southeastern Iran to the west. Its southern coastline, including the Makran Coast, is washed by the Arabian Sea, in particular by its western part, the Gulf of Oman.

== Etymology ==
The name "Balochistan" derives from the name of the Baloch people. Since the Baloch people are not mentioned in pre-Islamic sources, it is likely that the Baloch were known by some other name in their place of origin and that they acquired the name "Baloch" only after arriving in Balochistan some time in the 10th century.

During the time of Alexander the Great (356–323 BCE), the Greeks called the land Gedrosia and its people Gedrosoi, terms of unknown origin.

== History ==
=== Prehistoric ===
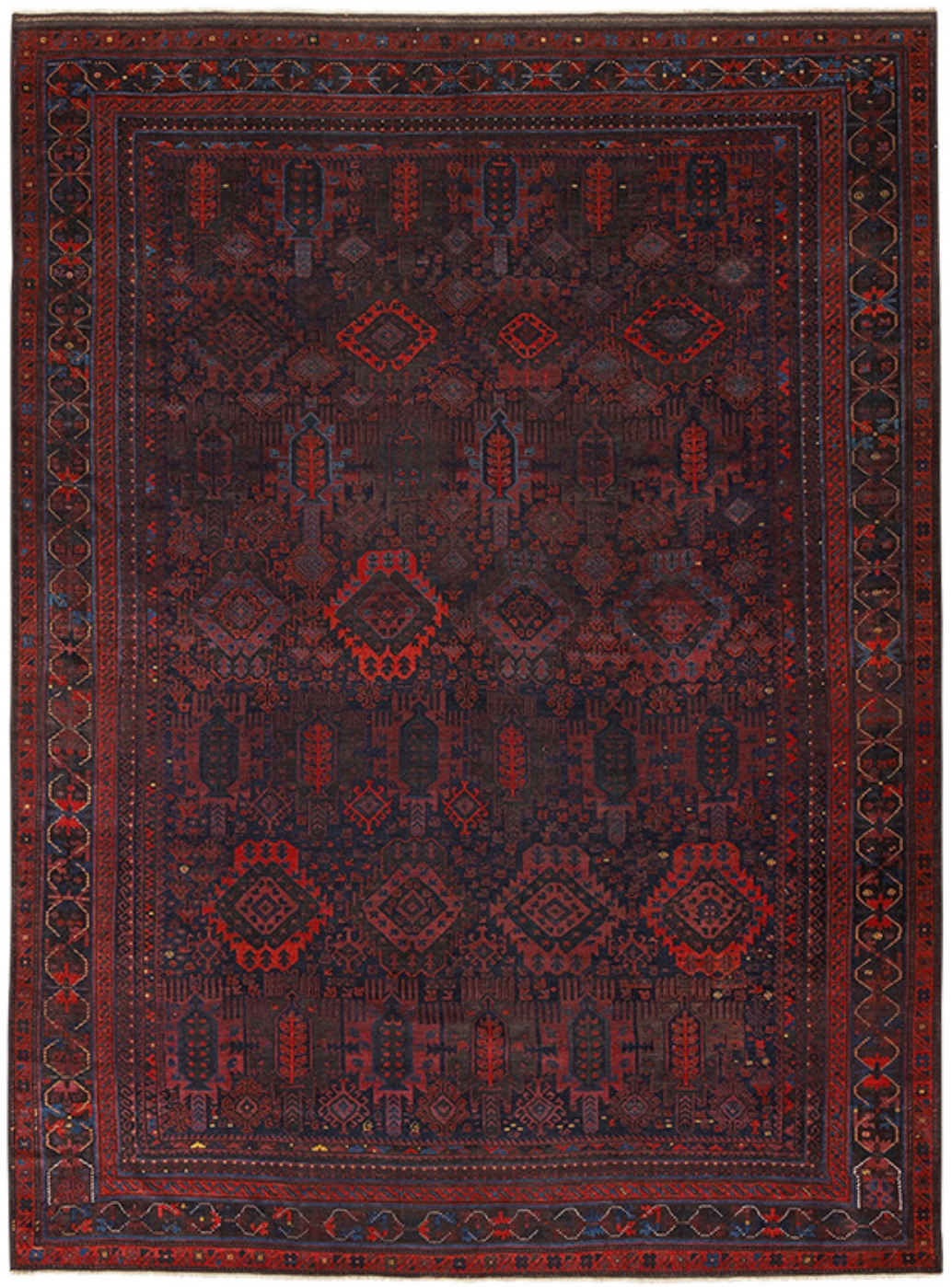
Large Baluch carpet, from the mid 19th century. Alternating rows depict cypress trees and Turkmen Gül motifs in offset colouration. The sombre background colours are characteristic of Baluch weavings. This likely was a commission for a tribal Khan or chieftain for ceremonial use.

Although Balochistan was inhabited by a variety of people, Baloch people did not migrate to the region until the 14th century. Balochistan is among the earliest human settlements in the world, and the oldest evidence of human occupation in it is dated to the Paleolithic era. Evidence includes hunting camps, lithic scatter, and chipped and flaked stone tools. The earliest settled villages in the region date to the ceramic Neolithic (c. 7000–6000 BCE) and include the site of Mehrgarh in the Kachi Plain, which may make Balochistan the oldest civilisation in the world.

These villages expanded in size during the subsequent Chalcolithic when interaction was amplified. This involved the movement of finished goods and raw materials, including chank shell, lapis lazuli, turquoise, and ceramics. By 2500 BCE (the Bronze Age), the region now known as Pakistani Balochistan had become part of the Indus Valley civilisation cultural orbit, providing key resources to the expansive settlements of the Indus river basin to the east.

=== Classical period ===
Herodotus in 450 BCE described the Paraitakenoi as a tribe ruled by Deiokes, a Persian king, in northwestern Persia (History I.101).

The region, known as Gedrosia, was conquered by Alexander the Great (356–323 BCE) and his Macedonian army. Arrian describes how Alexander the Great encountered the Pareitakai in Bactria and Sogdiana, and had them conquered by Craterus (Anabasis Alexandrou IV). The Periplus of the Erythraean Sea (1st century CE) describes the territory of the Paradon beyond the Ommanitic region, on the coast of modern Balochistan.

From the 1st century to the 3rd century CE, the region was ruled by the Pāratarājas (lit. 'Pārata Kings'), a Hindu dynasty of Indo-Scythian kings. The dynasty of the Pāratas is thought to be identical with the Pāradas of the Mahabharata, the Puranas and other Vedic and Iranian sources. The Parata kings are primarily known through their coins, which typically exhibit the bust of the ruler (with long hair in a headband) on the obverse, and a swastika within a circular legend on the reverse, written in Brahmi (usually silver coins) or Kharoshthi (copper coins). These coins are mainly found in Loralai in today's western Pakistan.

=== Medieval period ===
During the reign of Arab dynasties, medieval Iran suffered the onslaught of Ghaznavids, Mongols, Timurids, and the incursions of Oguhz Turks. The relationship between the Baloch and nearly all these powers were hostile, and the Baloch suffered enormously during this long period. The Baloch encounters with these powers and the subsequent Baloch miseries forced the Baloch tribes to move from the areas of conflicts and to settle in the far-flung and inaccessible regions. The bloody conflicts with Buyids and Seljuqs were instrumental in waves of migration by the Baloch tribes from Kerman to further east.

The Hindu Sewa dynasty ruled parts of Balochistan, chiefly Kalat. The Sibi Division, which was carved out of Quetta Division and Kalat Division in 1974, derives its name from Rani Sewi, the queen of the Sewa dynasty.

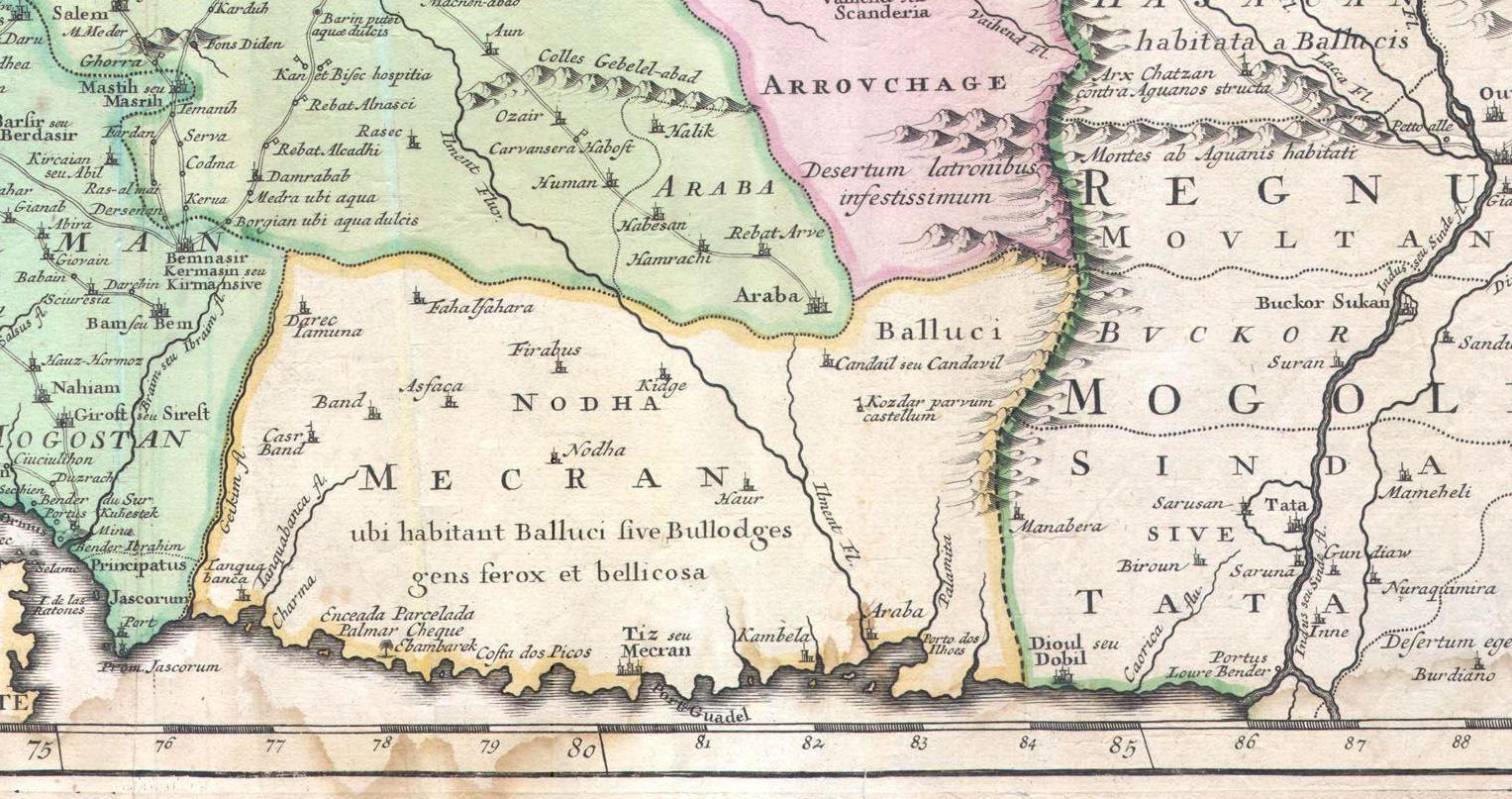
Map of independent Balochistan under the Brahui Kalat Khanate in 1730

The region was fully Islamised by the 9th century and became part of the territory of the Saffarids of Zaranj, followed by the Ghaznavids, then the Ghorids. The relation between the Ghaznavids and the Baloch had never been peaceful. Turan and Makuran came under the Ghaznavids founder Sebuktegin's suzerainty as early as 976–977 CE (Bosworth, 1963). The Baloch tribes fought against Sebuktegin when he attacked Khuzdar in 994. The Baloch were in the army of Saffarids Amir Khalaf and fought against Mahmud when the Ghaznavids forces invaded Sistan in 1013 (Muir, 1924). Many other occasions were mentioned by the historians of the Ghaznavids era in which the Baloch came into confrontation with the Ghaznavids forces (Nizam al-Mulk, 1960).

There are only passing references of Baloch encounters with the Mongols hordes. In one of the classical Balochi ballads, there is mention of a Baloch chieftain, Shah Baloch and the Baloch community of Herat's Kahdestan, who, according to Saif Heravi, was the governor or ruler of Kahdestan and heroically resisted the advance of the Mongols to Herat and Sistan with his Baloch army.

During the long period of en masse migrations, the Baloch were travelling through settled territories, and it could not have been possible to survive simply as wandering nomads. Perpetual migrations, hostile attitudes of other tribes and rulers, and adverse climactic conditions ruined much of their cattle breeding. Settled agriculture became a necessity for the survival of herds and an increased population. They began to combine settled agriculture with animal husbandry. The Baloch tribes now consisted of sedentary and nomadic population, a composition that remained an established feature of the Baloch tribes until recently.

=== Early Modern era ===
The Khanate of Kalat was the first unified polity to emerge in the history of Balochistan. It took birth from the confederacy of nomadic Brahui tribes native to the central Balochistan in 1666 which under Mir Ahmad Khan I declared independence from the Mughal suzeraignty and slowly absorbed the Baloch principalities in the region. It was ruled over by the Brahui Ahmadzai dynasty till 1948. Ahmad Shah Durrani made it vassal of the Afghan Durrani Empire in 1749. In 1758 the Khan of Kalat, Nasir Khan I Ahmadzai, revolted against Ahmed Shah Durrani, defeated him, and made his Khanate independent from the Durrani Empire.

=== Tribalism and nomadism ===
Baloch tribalism in medieval times was synonymous with pastoral nomadism. Nomadic people, as observed by Heape (1931), regard themselves as the superior of sedentary or agriculturist. It is, perhaps, because the occupation of nomads made them strong, active, and inured to hardship and the dangers which beset a mobile life.

The areas of Balochistan where the Baloch tribes moved in had a sedentary population, and the Baloch tribes were compelled to deal with their sedentary neighbours. Being in a weaker position, the Baloch tribes were in need of constant vigils for their survival in new lands. To deal with this problem, they began to make alliances and organised themselves into a more structured way. The structural solution to this problem was to create tribal confederacies or unions. Thus, in conditions of insecurity and disorder or when threatened by a predatory regional authority or a hostile central government, several tribal communities would form a cluster around a chief who had demonstrated his ability to offer protection and security.

=== British occupation ===
The British took over Balochistan in 1839.

In the 1870s, Baluchistan came under control of the British Indian Empire in colonial India. The fundamental objective of the British to enter into a treaty agreement with the Khanate of Kalat was to provide a passage and supplies to the "Army of Indus" on its way to Kandahar through Shikarpur, Jacobabad (Khangadh), Dhadar, Bolan Pass, Quetta, and Khojak Pass. It is interesting to note that the British imperialist interests in Balochistan were not primarily economic as was the case with other regions of India. Rather, it was of a military and geopolitical nature. Their basic objective in their advent in Balochistan was to station garrisons so as to defend the frontiers of British India from any threat coming from Iran and Afghanistan.

Beginning from 1840, there began a general insurrection against the British rule throughout Balochistan. The Baloch were not ready to accept their country as part of an occupied Afghanistan and to be ruled under a puppet Khan. The Mari tribe rose in revolt and the British retaliated in force. A British contingent under the command of Major Brown on 11 May 1840, attacked the Mari headquarter of Kahan and occupied Kahan Fort and the surrounding areas (Masson, 1974). The Mari forces withdrew from the area, regrouped, and in an ambush wiped out a whole convoy of British troops near Filiji, killing more than one hundred.

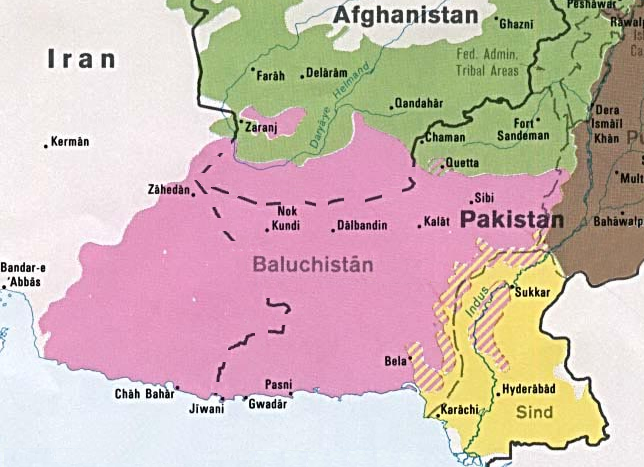
Map of Balochistan released by the CIA in 1980

During the time of the Indian independence movement, "three pro-Congress parties were still active in Balochistan's politics", such as the Anjuman-i-Watan Baluchistan, which favoured a united India and opposed its partition.

=== Post-colonial history ===
The 2021 Balochistan earthquake killed dozens of people. There were other major earthquakes in 2013 (2013 Balochistan earthquake and 2013 Saravan earthquake).

== Culture ==
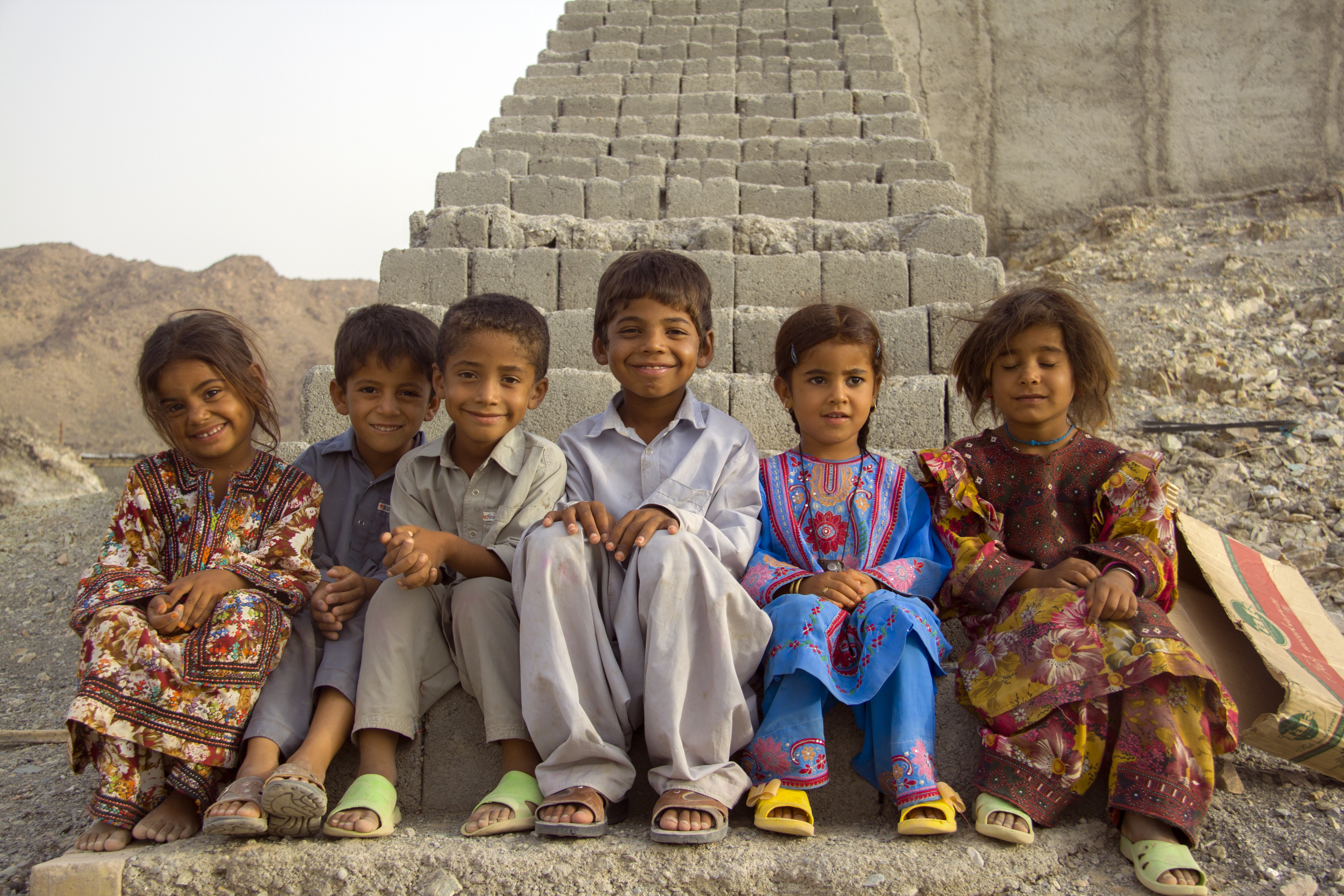
Baloch children photographed in Ashkutu, Iran, in March 2017

The cultural values which are the pillars of the Baloch individual and national identity were firmly established during the twelfth and sixteenth centuries, a period which not only brought sufferings for the Baloch and forced them into en masse migrations but also brought fundamental sociocultural transformation of the Baloch society. An overlapping of pastoral ecology and tribal structure had shaped contemporary Baloch social values. The pastoralist nomadic way of life and the inclination to resist the assimilation attempts of various powerful ethnic identities shaped the peculiar Baloch ethnic identity. It was the persecution by strong and organised religions for the last two thousand years that has shaped their secular attitude about religion in social or community affairs. Their independent and stubborn behaviour as the distinctive feature of the Baloch identity is consistent with their nomadic or agro-pastoral past.

Med o Maraka, for resolution of disputes among the Baloch, is a much-honoured tradition. In a broader context, it is, in a way, accepting the guilt by the accused or offender and asking for forgiveness from the affected party. Usually, the offender himself does this by going to the home of the affected person and asking for forgiveness.

Dress code and personal upkeeping are among the cultural values, which distinguish a Baloch from others. The Baloch dress and personal upkeeping very much resemble the Median and Parthian ways. Surprisingly, no significant changes can be observed in the Balochi dress since the ancient times. A typical Balochi outfit consisted of loose-fitting and many-folded trousers held by garters, bobbed hair, shirt (qamis), and a head turban. Generally, both hair and beard were carefully curled, but, sometimes, they depended on long straight locks. A typical dress of a Baloch woman consists of a long frock and trouser (shalwaar) with a headscarf.

=== Music ===
Zahirok is one of the most important and well-known Balochi song genres, often described as the “Balochi classical music” by the Baloch themselves.

Instruments in traditional Balochi music include suroz, donali, ghaychak, dohol, sorna, rubab, kemenche, tamburag, and benju.

== Religion ==
Before the Islamic era, the Baloch were the followers of Mazdakian and Manichean sects of Zoroastrian.

Many among the Baloch writers observed that the persecutions of the Baloch by the Sassanid emperors Shapur II and Khosrow II had a strong religious or sectarian element. They believed that there are strong indications that the Baloch were the followers of Mazdakian and Manichean sects of the Zoroastrian religion at the time of their fatal encounters with Sassanid forces. The Baloch were converted to Islam (nearly all Baloch belong to the Sunni sect of Islam) after the Arab conquest of Balochistan during the seventh century.

== Governance and political disputes ==
Flag used by most Baloch nationalists and separatists

The Balochistan region is administratively divided among three countries, Pakistan, Afghanistan, and Iran. The largest portion in area and population is in Pakistan, whose largest province (in land area) is Balochistan. An estimated 6.9 million of Pakistan's population is Baloch. In Iran there are about two million ethnic Baloch, and a majority of the population of the Sistan and Baluchestan province, southern Kerman province, southern South Khorasan province and eastern Hormozgan province is of Baloch ethnicity. The Afghan portion of Balochistan includes the Chahar Burjak District of Nimruz Province, and the Registan Desert in southern Helmand and Kandahar provinces. The governors of Nimruz province in Afghanistan belong to the Baloch ethnic group. President Pervez Musharraf ordered military action that killed a tribal head from the Pakistani province of Balochistan in 2006 which led to an increase in insurgency.

The Balochistan region has also experienced a number of insurgencies with separatist militants demanding independence of Baloch regions in the three countries to form "Greater Balochistan". In Pakistan, insurgencies by separatist militants in Balochistan province have been fought in 1948, 1958–1959, 1962–1963 and 1973–1977, with a new ongoing low-intensity insurgency beginning in 2003. Historically, drivers of the conflict are reported to include "tribal divisions", the Baloch-Pashtun ethnic divisions, "marginalization by Punjabi interests", and "economic oppression". However, over the years, insurgency waged by separatist militants declined as result of crackdown by Pakistani security forces, infighting among the separatist militants and assassinations of Baloch politicians willing to take part in Pakistan's democratic process by the separatist militants. Separatist militants in Pakistan demand more autonomy and a greater share in the region's natural resources. The Baloch population in Pakistan has endured grave violations of human rights, which include extrajudicial killings, enforced disappearances, and torture. These actions are purportedly perpetrated by state security forces and their associates. In 2019, United States declared Baloch Liberation Army, one of the separatist militants fighting the government of Pakistan, a global terrorist group.

In Iran, separatist fighting has reportedly not gained as much ground as the conflict in Pakistan, but has grown and become more sectarian since 2012, with the majority-Sunni Baloch showing a greater degree of Salafist and anti-Shia ideology in their fight against the Shia-Islamist Iranian government. Sistan-Baluchestan, one of Iran's poorest regions, has long been plagued by unrest involving drug-smuggling gangs, rebels from the Baluchi minority and Sunni extremists.

On 11 March 2025, the Jaffar Express, a passenger train travelling from Quetta to Peshawar in Pakistan, was hijacked by militants in the Bolan district of Balochistan province. The attack resulted in the train halting in a remote area, with reports indicating that the driver was injured during the assault. They asserted that they had taken over 400 hostages, including security personnel, and threatened to execute them if Pakistani forces launched a rescue operation.

According to Masom Jan Masomy, "Balochistan's strategic importance is also vital for China, which sees the Balochistan province as an essential corridor for its geostrategic and logistic plans of the One Belt One Road Initiative".

== See also ==
- Baloch nationalism
- Bolan Pass
- Mehrgarh
- Seistan Force
- Baluchitherium

== Bibliography ==
- Tandon, Pankaj (2006), "New light on the Pāratarājas" (PDF), Numismatic Chronicle, 166: 173–209, JSTOR 42666407
