= Ghaychak =

Musical instrument

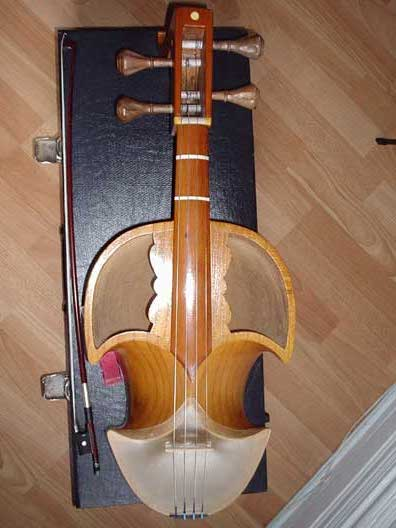
- Classification: Bowed string instrument

Related instruments
- Rubab; Kobyz; Sarinda; Sarangi; Kyl kyyak

The ghaychak or gheychak (Persian: قیچک) is a bowed lute used in Iran, Afghanistan, Pakistan, and Tajikistan. The name is similar to the Central Asian ghijak, but that instrument is more closely related to the kamancheh.

== Double-chambered bowl lute ==
A double-chambered bowl lute with four or more metal strings and a short fretless neck. It is used by Iranians and Baloch people, and is similar to Sarinda.

The soundbox is carved out of a single piece of wood. The upper orifice is partly covered in the middle by the handle and the lower one is covered by a skin membrane against which the bridge rests.

In most Balochi musics, it is considered the main instrument and it is only through this instrument that the Baloch musician can tell his inner sadness with the same poignancy.

The most famous musician of this instrument is Din Mohammad Zangshahi from Balochistan.

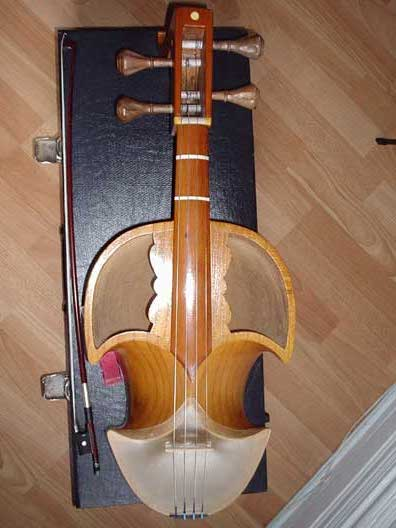
Ghaychak

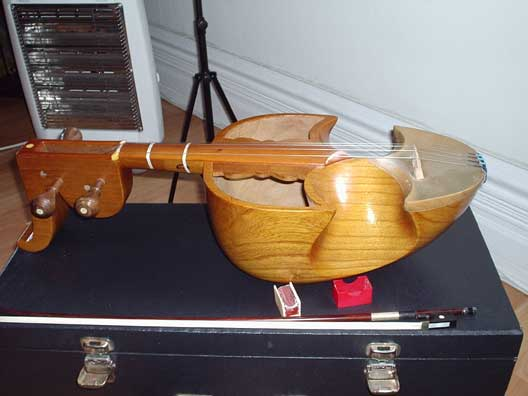
side view

== Sources ==
- "Glossary of Instruments - AKMICA" (PDF). Archived from the original (PDF) on 2006-12-06.
