= Donali =

Iranian instrument

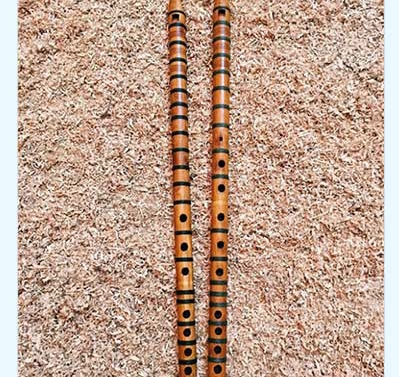
- Baluchi Donali

Related instruments
- Ney; Dozaleh; Double clarinet; Recorder (musical instrument)

Donali (Persian: دونَلی) or Alghoza (Sindhi: الغوزو ) is an Iranian folk instrument in the Balochistan province in Iran originally borrowed from Sindh, a pair of fipple flutes that are put in the mouth at the same time to play. The instrument is from the Ney family. The doneli's body is made of reed. One of the instruments is called male (نر) and the other female (ماده). The instrument named female plays melody and the instrument named male plays harmony.

== History ==
Donali or Doney is an immigrant instrument and was brought to Baluchistan, Iran, from Sindh, half a century ago. In addition to Balochistan, this instrument is used in Indian music (the (Alghoza) and Pakistani music.

== Playing ==
"Nal"(نَل) in Balochi means straw. This instrument consists of two reeds that the musician puts both in his mouth while playing. The type of mouthpiece and the way of blowing in a donali is like a recorder. Unlike a recorder, which uses regular breathing, the doneli is played with circular breathing. This means that the artist inhales through the nose and exhales through the mouth, and uses pressure in the mouth to keep the flow of air uninterrupted even while breathing in. The technique allows a musician to play non-stop.

The female reed has ten holes that are fitted with only six holes. The male reed also has seven holes and none of them are fingered. Male reed holes are used to create various harmonies and some of the holes can be blocked with wax to set the pipe's notes. Donali sound pipes do not have an acoustic hole in the back. The most famous musician of this instrument is Shir Mohammad Espandar from Balochistan.

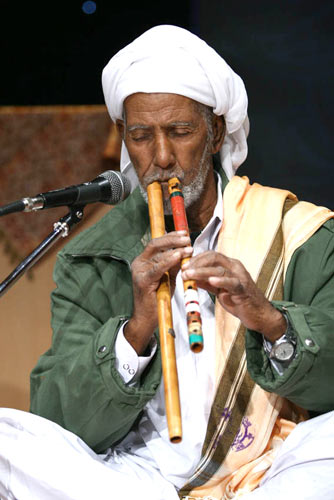
Shir Mohammad Espandar

The instrument may be played solo, or may be accompanied with a tambourine and drum.
