= Balochi music =

Music of the Baloch people

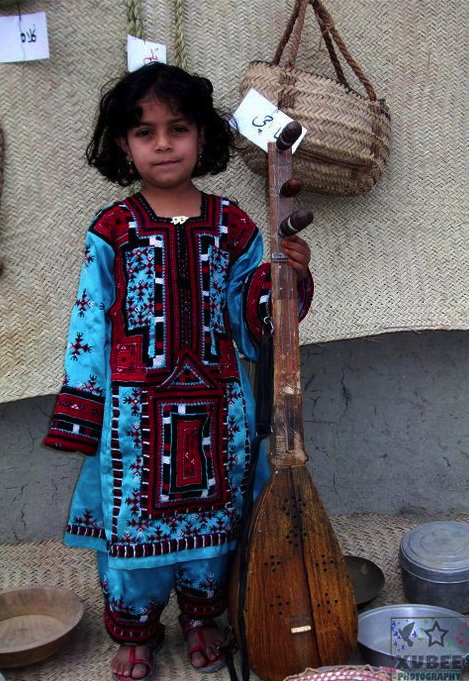
Tanbur

Balochi music is the musical traditions of the Baloch people and music in the Balochi language. The Baloch people have a rich oral tradition that includes poems and songs to celebrate or commemorate many events such as religious rites, festivals, or holidays and dance.

Types of Baloch songs include Balochi praise songs (sipatt and nazenk), love songs (dastanag), elegies (Mōtk or Mowtk.), lullabies (lilo), wedding and circumcision songs (halo and lado), songs of separation (zahirok, liko), epics (sher), fishermen’s songs (amba and lewa), healing songs ( gwati, sheki, sheparja, and malid, Zar), and Zikri ritual songs.

Notable musical forms in Balochi culture include Sepad, Shabtagi, Vazbad, Lullaby, and Zahirok, which are performed in various rituals, such as those following the birth of a child, while lullabies are sung to soothe infants and children.

As with spoken language, Baloch music varies from region to region.

The main meter of Nazenk is a melancholic and emotional, often dealing with themes of separation and longing. Nazenk is sung without music and in a melodic or recited way. Basically the singers of this type of songs are often women but men also perform and sing them.

Leva is a form of Balochi music, upbeat and celebratory songs performed at weddings and festivals.

Liko is often performed during celebrations, weddings, and cultural festivals. The word liko conveys sense of longing. The performance typically involves traditional instruments such as the suroz and dhol creating lively rhythms that accompany the dance. Liko features energetic movements, often characterized by circular formations where dancers hold hands and move in sync with the music.

Balochi music has been very popular in Iran, Oman and Pakistan.

== Music instruments ==
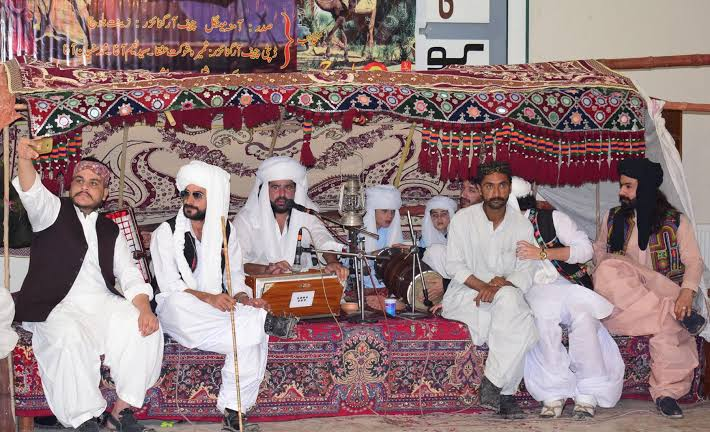
Balochi folk music

Instruments in traditional Balochi music include suroz, donali, ghaychak, dohol, sorna, rubab, kemenche, tamburag and benju.

Suroz is a balochi instrument and the preferred accompaniment instrument for . Baloch musicians would learn to play this instrument from their families because the art of instrumental music was considered a hereditary profession.

Traditional Balochi dances like Chaap, perform with suroz, Sorna, Dohol and tamburag.

== History ==
Balochi music, as a valuable art, has been passed from one generation to another and mostly composed by people who remained anonymous. This music reflects their history, struggles, love, and connection to nature. It features a mix of traditional instruments, poetic lyrics, Balochi literature and distinct rhythms that evoke a sense of both longing and celebration.

The Balochi zahirok dates back to the 15th century, and some Baloch think it is the original form of Balochi music. They were originally sung by pahlawan, or mintrels, and Baloch scholar Gul Khan Nasir believes that zahiroks were originally composed by women.

Baloch songs are strongly melancholic, expressing deep emotions that culturally distinct from other regions. Many Balochi songs and form of music originate from the Safavid period and Jalal Khan, Hammal Jiand, Mir Gwahram Khan Lashari and Mir Chakar Rind.

Baloch music continues to have a presence, with Baloch artists releasing both traditional songs and contemporary compositions. Baloch musicians have brought their traditional music to places like Europe on tours, and to online music platforms like YouTube and Bandcamp.

== Traditional baloch dance ==
- chaap

== See also ==
- Music of Pakistan
- Kana Yaari
