= Asghar Imanian =

Iranian fighter pilot (1929–2015)

Timsar Asghar Imanian
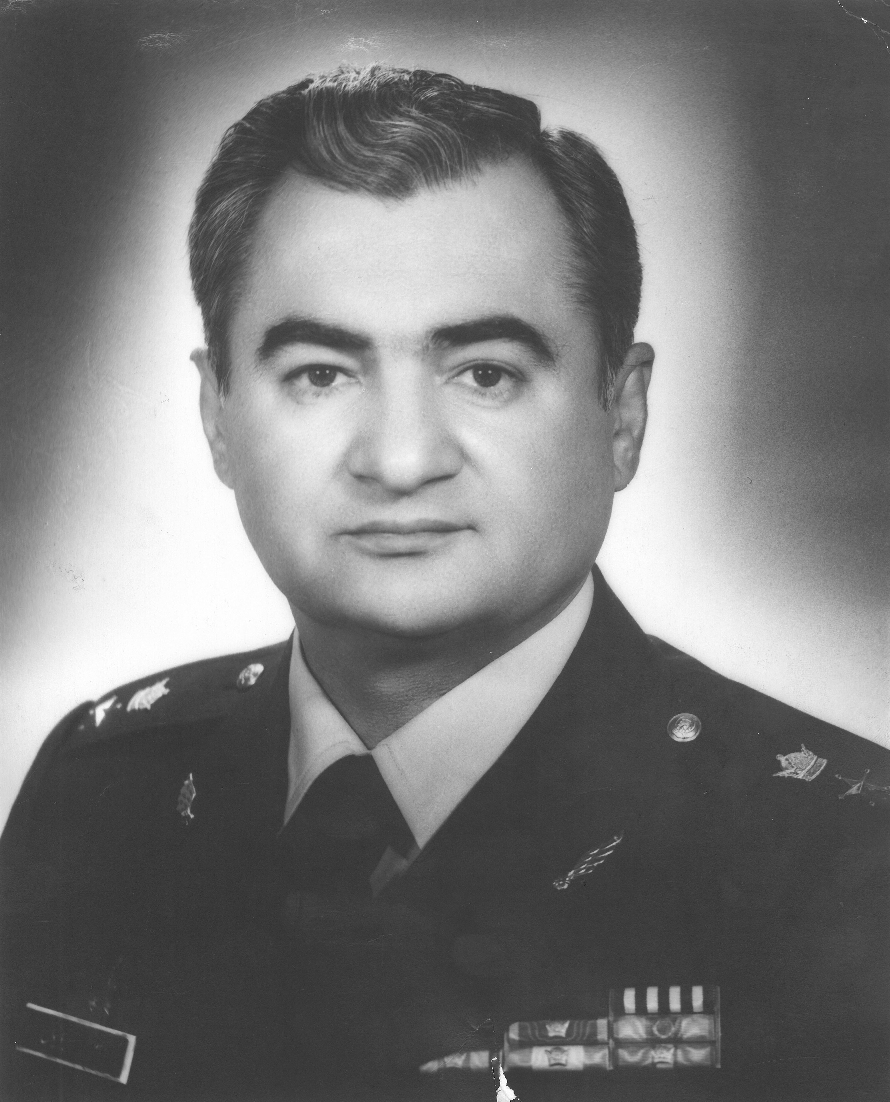
- Imanian, c. 1970s
- Born: 9 August 1929; Mashhad, Pahlavi Iran
- Died: 17 April 2015 (aged 85); Tehran, Iran
- Burial place: Behesht-e Zahra
- Military career
- Allegiance: Pahlavi Iran (1950–1979); Iran (1979)
- Branch: Imperial Iranian Air Force (1950–1979); Islamic Republic of Iran Air Force (1979)
- Service years: 1950–1979
- Rank: Brigadier General
- Commands: Iranian Air Force (1979); 2nd Tactical Air Base (Tabriz) (1976–1979); Deputy Commander of the 4th Tactical Air Base (Dezful); Chief of Tactical Operations, Operations Directorate; 204th Tactical Fighter Squadron
- Conflicts: 1979 Kurdish rebellion in Iran

Asghar Imanian (Persian: اصغر ایمانیان; 8 August 1929 – 17 April 2015) was an Iranian fighter pilot. He served as the commander of the Air Force from 25 February to early 12 1979.

Before the Iranian Revolution of 1979, he was a member of the Imperial Iranian Air Force's Golden Crown Aerobatic Team. He also served as Commander of the 2nd Tactical Air Base (Tabriz) from 20 August 1976 until 24 February 1979. He died in Tehran on 17 April 2015, aged 85.

== Early life ==
During the final years of the Qajar dynasty, Imanian's parents emigrated from Ashgabat to Mashhad with their seven-month-old son, Hassan, along with many of their Turkic relatives. They settled in the village of Sanabad (now the Saadabad neighborhood), which was then located outside Mashhad.

His father, a religious and well-read merchant, worked in the Mashhad bazaar. Asghar, the family's fifth child, was born on 9 August 1929. After graduating from secondary school with a concentration in mathematics and natural sciences, he took the entrance examination for medical school in Tehran at his family's insistence and was accepted, following the path of his two older brothers. However, after meeting a pilot friend in Tehran, he decided to pursue a military career instead

Imanian joined the Imperial Iranian Army in 1950. His younger brother, Mahmoud Imanian, later followed the same path despite family opposition and eventually became one of Iran's leading F-5 pilots, member of the Golden Crown Aerobatic Team, and an F-5 instructor pilot. Colonel Mahmoud Imanian was appointed commander of the Mehrabad Air Region on the first day of the Iran–Iraq War.

In 1953, Imanian married one of his relatives, Sona Erfani, and the couple had one daughter, Roxana.

== Military career ==
=== Early Air Force service ===
Imanian entered the Military Academy in 1950 and graduated as a Second Lieutenant in October 1955. Shortly afterward, he attended several advanced military courses—including battalion command, staff command, and S.O.S. courses—in West Germany and the United States.

In 1958, he earned his jet pilot qualification and soon joined the newly established Golden Crown Aerobatic Team.

=== Golden Crown Aerobatic Team ===
The Golden Crown Aerobatic Team was established in 1958 through the efforts of Nader Jahanbani, then a major in the Imperial Iranian Air Force. Initially flying four F-84 Thunderjets, the team later expanded to a nine-aircraft formation.

Imanian joined the team alongside pilots Amir-Bahman Bagheri, Ayat Mohaqeqi, Fariborz Payvar, and Nader Yousefi, joining the original members led by Nader Jahanbani, Amir Hossein Rabii, Khatami, Jahanbini, Minouspehr, and Izaddoust. The team's first nine-aircraft demonstration took place in 1959.

For many years, Imanian flew with the Golden Crown Team in both F-86 Sabres and Northrop F-5s, under the leadership of Nader Jahanbani and Amir Hossein Rabiei.

Reflecting on flying with Jahanbani, Imanian later stated:

"General Jahanbani was such a pilot that when I flew on his wing, I needed to focus only on maintaining my position relative to his aircraft. I never had to worry about altitude, obstacles, or anything else."

Within the aerobatic formation, Imanian consistently occupied the No. 4 (tail) position, a distinction later engraved on his gravestone.

=== Command appointments before the Revolution ===
After serving as:

- Commander of the 204th Tactical Fighter Squadron (F-86 Sabre)
- Chief of Tactical Operations, Operations Directorate
- Deputy Commander of the 4th Tactical Air Base (Dezful)

Imanian was promoted to Brigadier General in 1976 and appointed Deputy Chief of Staff of the Air Force as well as Commander of the 2nd Tactical Air Base (Tabriz).

During the revolutionary unrest of 1978–79, demonstrators in Tabriz attempted to enter the air base to seize its weapons. Addressing representatives of Mohammad Ali Qazi Tabatabaei in Azeri, Imanian declared:

"We are soldiers of the people and of the country. We stand with the people and follow the will of the people.".

At the same time, he prevented demonstrators from entering the base or obtaining its weapons while also ensuring that no harm came to Air Force personnel. His actions helped preserve order both at the base and in the city of Tabriz.

Following the victory of the revolution on 11 February 1979, he remained at his post at the request of Mohammad Ali Ghazi Tabatabaei, Ayatollah Khomeini's representative in Tabriz. On 24 February 1979, amid widespread disorder within the Air Force, he was recalled to Tehran.

=== Commander of the Air Force ===
At the Alavi School, following a meeting with Ayatollah Ruhollah Khomeini, and on the recommendation of the Chief of the Joint Staff, Imanian was appointed Commander of the National Air Force (later the Islamic Republic of Iran Air Force) in recognition of his military record and conduct during the revolution.

The newspaper Kayhan, in its 27 February 1979 edition, announced his appointment as the new Chief of Staff of the National Air Force. His appointment followed the rejection by Air Force personnel of two previous commanders appointed after the revolution, and effectively ended the protests within the service.

During his approximately six months in command, Imanian focused on:

Restoring discipline within the Air Force after the revolution. Preventing political factions from taking control of the service. Opposing proposals to replace the military command structure with collective or council-based management. Reorganizing Iranian personnel following the departure of American military advisers. Providing logistical and transportation support to the country's emerging post-revolutionary institutions.

In August 1979, after submitting his resignation for a second time, he retired from military service at the age of 50.

=== Retirement ===
Following retirement, Imanian initially lived in rented accommodation before purchasing an apartment on Karim Khan Street in Tehran. According to reports, his only significant asset at the time of his death was a 120-square-meter apartment in western Tehran.

Friends and relatives recalled that he devoted much of his retirement to helping others, a trait that had earned him the nickname "Asghar Ghosseh-Khor" ("Asghar the Worrier") since his cadet days.

He consistently declined requests for interviews from both Iranian and foreign media.

Among the stories he occasionally recounted was informing Tehran of the death of Air Marshal Mohammad Khatami, then Commander of the Air Force, who died during a hang-gliding accident near the Dez Dam.

He was also said to become deeply emotional whenever discussing the executions of Generals Nader Jahanbani and Amir Hossein Rabii after the revolution.

== Death ==
Imanian had long suffered from chronic heart and pulmonary disease, which worsened following a minor stroke in March 2014. In January 2015, he was hospitalized at Valiasr Hospital because of a severe lung infection. After ten days he requested discharge despite only partial recovery.

As his respiratory condition continued to deteriorate and he increasingly relied on oxygen support while refusing further hospitalization, he died late on the evening of 17 April 2015, coinciding with Army Day in Iran.

His funeral was held on 20 April 2015 at the Air Force Training Center in Tehran, attended by senior Air Force commanders, veterans, former colleagues, and members of his family. He was buried in the Namavaran Section of Behesht-e Zahra Cemetery (Plot 255, Row 27, Grave 20).

Military offices
Preceded by Shapour Azarbarzin	Commander of the Iranian Air Force; 25 February 1979–12 August 1979	Succeeded by Amir-Bahman Bagheri
