= Golden Crown =

Imperial Iranian Air Force Aerobatic Team Golden Crown
- Golden Crown insignia
- Active: 30 October 1958 – 11 February 1979
- Disbanded: after 1979 Revolution (revival is still ongoing)
- Country: Iran
- Branch: Imperial Iranian Air Force
- Role: Aerobatic display team
- Part of: part of 1st Fighter Interceptor Squadron
- Garrison/HQ: Mehrabad (THR); Khatami Air Base
- Colours: ■□■ (three colours of the flag of Iran)

Commanders
- Leader: Nader Jahanbani (1958–1962,1969); Amir Hossein Rabii (1963,1968); Abdolhossein Minusepehr (1964–1966); Bahram Hooshyar (1970); Ayat Mohaqeqi (1971–1972); Vahid Kimiagar (1973); Mahmoud Imanian (1974); Manouchehr Khalili (1975–1979)

Aircraft flown
- Fighter: F-84G Thunderjet (1958–1960); F-86F Sabre (1960–1967,1969); F-5A Freedom Fighter (1968,1970–1975); F-5E Tiger II (1976–1979)

The Golden Crown (Persian: تاج طلایی Tāj-e Talāyi) was Iran's first national aerobatics display team and part of the former Imperial Iranian Air Force (IIAF) from 1958 to 1979. It was formed by fighter pilot Nader Jahanbani, mainly inspired by the USAFE Skyblazers, an American aerobatics team. During the Cold War the team performed in many competitions.

== History ==
The Golden Crown was founded in 1958. Fourteen Iranian pilots were sent to Fürstenfeldbruck Air Base, Germany, for jet aircraft pilot training. Nine returned to Iran after a couple of months, while five remained to undertake training to become instructors. One of the five pilots, Nader Jahanbani, observed a practice session of the USAFE Skyblazers at Fürstenfeldbruck. He was allowed to fly in the backseat during several practice sessions. This inspired him to create the IIAF's own demonstration team. With the Shah's blessing, Jahanbani and three other members of the Fürstenfeldbruck group (Amir Hossein Rabii, Siamak Jahanbini, and Abdolhossein Minusepehr) formed the Golden Crown aerobatic team. They were joined by General Mohammad Amir Khatami, who became its fifth member. After 72 training sessions, the team performed its first aerobatic display in 1958. It was equipped with four Republic F-84G Thunderjet aircraft. By 1959, they used nine F-84s.

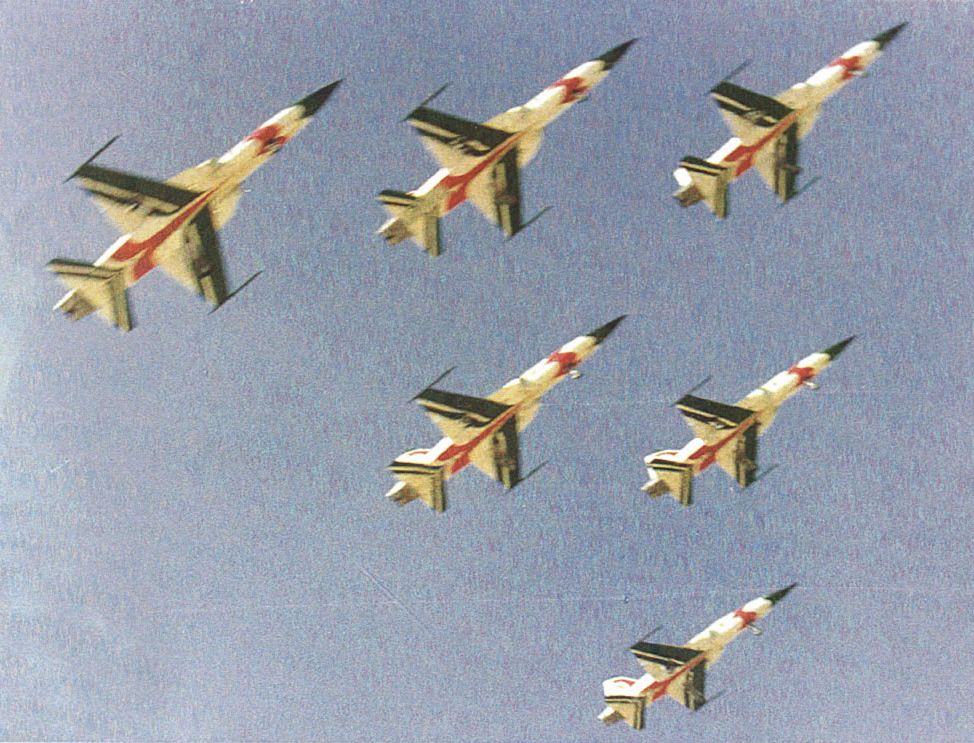
Six F-5Es of the Golden Crown display team

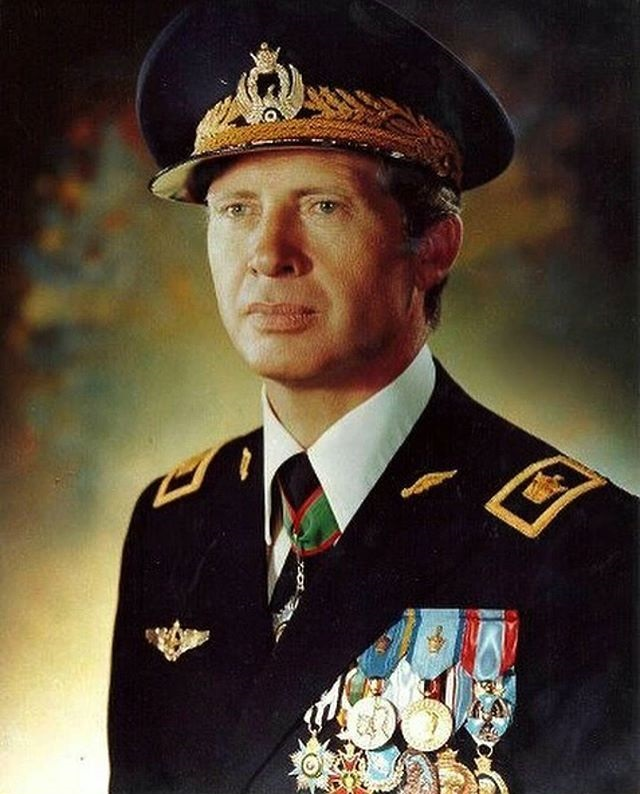
Lt. Gen Nader Jahanbani

The team performed near Mehrabad International Airport and later at Kooshk Nosrat, 100 kilometres from Tehran.

IIAF ace Yadollah Javadpour was a member of the Golden Crown from 1975 to 1978. Other members include Asghar Imanian, Bahram Hooshyar, Fereidoon Izadseta, and Yadollah Sharifirad.

Following the Iranian Revolution in 1979, the team was disbanded after the IIAF was dissolved.

In February 2020, Aziz Nasirzadeh announced the revival of the team.

== See also ==
- History of Iranian military aviation
