= Yadollah =

Yadollah (Arabic: یدالله, yad-ullah) is a male given name common in Iran and some other countries. The name is of Arabic origin and means "Allah's (God's) hand".

== People named Yadollah ==
- Yadollah Bigdeli (1883–1960), Iranian army commander
- Yadollah Sahabi (1905–2002), Iranian scholar, writer and politician
- Yadollah Maftun Amini (1926–2022), Iranian poet
- Yadollah Royaee (1932–2022), Iranian poet
- Yadollah Duzduzani (born 1935), Iranian Twelver Shi'a Marja
- Yadollah Sharifirad (born 1946), Iranian fighter pilot and writer
- Yadollah Kaboli Khansari (born 1949), Iranian calligrapher
- Yadollah Samadi (1952–2018), Iranian film director
- Yadollah Mortazavi (born 1958), Iranian professor of chemical engineering
- Yadollah Jahanbazi (born 1973), Iranian football referee
- Yadollah Akbari (born 1974), Iranian footballer
- Yadollah Eslami, Iranian newspaper editor
- Yadollah Javadpour, Iranian fighter pilot
- Yadollah Javani, Iranian military politician

== Places ==
- Hajj Yadollah Mahalleh, village in Chubar Rural District, Haviq District, Talesh County, Gilan Province, Iran
- Mazraeh-ye Yadollah Jafari, village in Fasarud Rural District, in the Central District of Darab County, Fars Province, Iran
- Chalderaz-e Yadollah, village in Barez Rural District, Manj District, Lordegan County, Chaharmahal and Bakhtiari Province, Iran
- Tolombeh-ye Ashayiri Yadollah va Shorka, village in Deh Kahan Rural District, Aseminun District, Manujan County, Kerman Province, Iran
- Tolombeh-ye Yadollah Khalaj, village in Hana Rural District, Abadeh Tashk District, Neyriz County, Fars Province, Iran
- Qeshlaq-e Hajj Dowlat Yadollah, village in Qeshlaq-e Shomali Rural District, in the Central District of Parsabad County, Ardabil Province, Iran
- Tolombeh-ye Yadollah Sheybani, village in Golestan Rural District, in the Central District of Sirjan County, Kerman Province, Iran
- Tolombeh-ye Hajj Yadollah Ghorba, village in Golestan Rural District, in the Central District of Sirjan County, Kerman Province, Iran
- Tolombeh-ye Yadollah Ghorbapur, village in Golestan Rural District, in the Central District of Sirjan County, Kerman Province, Iran
- Mowtowr Pamp-e Yadollah Akbari Mowtowr-e Khalifehay 6, village in Vakilabad Rural District, in the Central District of Arzuiyeh County, Kerman Province, Iran
- Tolombeh-ye Hajj Yadollah Abbaslu va Shorka, village in Golestan Rural District, in the Central District of Sirjan County, Kerman Province, Iran
