= Amir-Bahman Bagheri =

Iranian military officer

Timsar Amir-Bahman Bagheri
- امیربهمن باقری
- Born: 1930
- Died: 2010 (aged 79–80)
- Military career
- Allegiance: Pahlavi Iran (1950–1979); Iran (1979–1980)
- Branch: Imperial Iranian Air Force (1950s–1979); Islamic Republic of Iran Air Force (1979–1980)
- Service years: 1950s–1980
- Rank: Major General
- Commands: Iranian Air Force (1979–1980)
- Conflicts: 1979 Kurdish rebellion in Iran; Operation Eagle Claw

Amir-Bahman Bagheri (Persian: امیربهمن باقری) was an Iranian military officer. Having previously served as the deputy commander of air defense unit in early 1979, he commanded the Air Force from 20 August 1979 to July 1980. In 1980, he was briefly arrested and removed from the office. Bagheri was arrested again in February 1981 on charges of "complicity" with the Americans in the Operation Eagle Claw. In July 1985, he was sentenced to life imprisonment.

Military offices
Preceded by Asghar Imanian	Commander of the Iranian Air Force; 20 August 1979 – July 1980	Succeeded by Javad Fakoori
