= Hooshyar =

Hooshyar is a surname. Notable people with the surname include:

- Bahram Hooshyar (1938–1991), Iranian Air Force officer
- Hossein Hooshyar (born 1986), Iranian footballer
