= Fereidoon Izadseta =

Iranian air force veteran fighter pilot and commander (1960–1984)

Colonel Fereidoon Izadseta
- فریدون ایزدستا
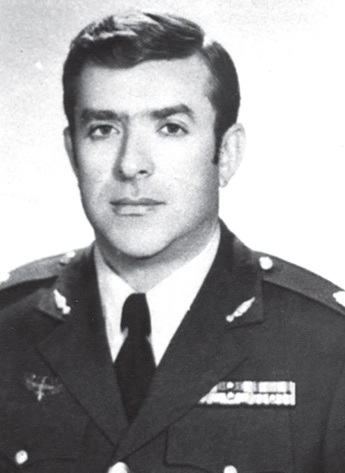
- Born: 1940 (age 85–86); Tehran, Iran
- Military career
- Allegiance: Iran
- Branch: IIAF; IRIAF
- Service years: 1960–1984
- Rank: Colonel (Sarhang)
- Units: USAF: UPT: Lackland AFB, Craig AFB; Fighter Weapons School: Nellis AFB; IIAF: 202nd TFS Vahdati; FWS Vahdati; Golden Crown Team; 11th TTS Mehrabad; 12th TFS Mehrabad; 63rd TFS Bushehr; IRIAF: 3rd TFB Hamedan; IRIAF Advisory Planning Group
- Commands: 12th TFS Mehrabad; 63rd TFS Bushehr; 3rd TFB Hamedan; Air Training Command Undergraduate Pilot Training (ATC UPT)
- Conflicts: Iran–Iraq War; Attack on H-3
- Awards: Air Force Distinguished Conquest Medal

Colonel Fereidoon Izadseta (born 1940) is an Iranian veteran fighter pilot and commanding officer who served in the Iranian Air Force, as well as a strategist during the Iran–Iraq War. He joined the Imperial Iranian Air Force (IIAF) in 1960 and retired from the Islamic Republic of Iran Air Force (IRIAF) in 1984. Over the course of his career, he held multiple commands and flew thousands of hours in jet fighters, primarily the F-86 Sabre and the F-4 Phantom II.

== Early career ==
After entering the IIAF and training to fly jets in the US, he returned to Iran and served at Vahdati AFB in Dezful in the southwest. There he served in the 202nd Tactical Fighter Squadron under Captain (later Major General) A. Minusepehr, flying the F-86 Sabre jet fighter. He also served in other roles at the base under the leadership of Major (later Lt. General) Mohammad H. Mehrmand, He went on to become an instructor in the newly established Fighter Weapons School at Vahdati. He also became an instructor pilot and member of the IIAF Golden Crown precision aerobatic team, led by Colonel (later General) Nader Jahanbani. By 1970 he had moved on to qualify on the brand new F-4 Phantom advanced fighter jet as a pilot and instructor and trained numerous Iranian Phantom pilots. During the IIAF era, he held multiple commands, including squadron and wing commander in the 6th Tactical Fighter Base (TFB) in Bushehr on the Persian Gulf. He also successfully completed several advanced trainings in the US, including Fighter Weapons School in Nellis Air Force Base (the USAF equivalent of and predecessor to Top Gun), Squadron Officer School in Maxwell Air Force Base (USAF Air University), and night gunnery and aerial refueling in Luke Air Force Base.

== Iranian Revolution and the Iran–Iraq War ==
After the Islamic revolution in Iran, he was among many IIAF officers who were dismissed from service, but he successfully advocated to be reinstated. He was promoted to the rank of colonel and transferred to Tehran. In this period he became wing commander of the 3rd TFB in Hamedan in western Iran and founded a new pilot academy to take over pilot training in Iran.

When the Iran–Iraq War broke out in September 1980, he was summoned along with his close friend and colleague Colonel Bahram Houshyar, and some other experienced officers by the IRIAF commander Colonel Javad Fakouri to form an advisory planning group to help plan and execute the Iranian air campaign which ultimately led to the defeat of the Iraqi invasion. The campaign involved many operations which struck and halted Iraqi ground forces, and severely degraded Iraqi naval and air forces, as well as the Iraqi oil industry. One of the most notable operations which was planned in part and led by Colonel Izadseta was the attack on H-3, a complex of airbases in western Iraq near the Jordanian border, in which dozens of Iraqi aircraft and other assets were destroyed.

Colonel Izadseta retired from the IRIAF in 1984. He published his memoirs in the book Immortals of the Sky in 2022. A documentary titled Fereidoun based on this book was released in Persian in 2023.
