= 11th Reconnaissance Squadron (Iran) =

- Active: 1958
- Country: Iran
- Branch: Imperial Iranian Air Force; Islamic Republic of Iran Air Force
- Type: Air force
- Role: Reconnaissance
- Size: Squadron
- Part of: Islamic Republic of Iran Air Force
- Garrison/HQ: Tehran, Mehrabad 1st Tactical Air Base
- Mottos: Alone, Fearless, Unarmed
- Engagements: Iran–Iraq War

The 11th Reconnaissance Squadron (Iran) was a unit of the Imperial Iranian Air Force and later the Islamic Republic of Iran Air Force, consisting of highly professional pilots trained for deep penetration and aerial photography missions inside enemy territory. The squadron was formed in 1958 during the reign of Mohammad Reza Pahlavi at the 1st Tactical Air Base in Mehrabad, and over time it was expanded and equipped with more advanced aircraft. The first aircraft in service was the RT-33, followed by the more advanced F-5 and F-4 reconnaissance aircraft.

== History ==
The squadron was initially formed in 1958 under the organizational chart of the Imperial Iranian Air Force at the Mehrabad 1st Tactical Air Base with RF-5A Freedom Fighter aircraft. In the early 1970s, sixteen RF-4 tactical reconnaissance aircraft, also known as Photo Phantoms, were purchased, completing the squadron. What distinguished the 11th Tactical Reconnaissance Squadron from other units of the Iranian Air Force was the nature of its missions: while operating as single aircraft deep inside enemy territory, their planes carried no offensive weapons. Their only defensive systems were ALQ-109 and ALQ-119 electronic warfare jamming pods. This is reflected in the squadron’s motto: "Alone, Fearless, Unarmed." Pilots of this Iranian squadron, unlike typical air operations, carried out their missions alone and without any offensive armament in enemy territory. Their only defensive measure was the use of electronic warfare jamming pods. The squadron’s reconnaissance operations deep into Iraqi territory correctly predicted the impending Iraqi invasion of Iran and reported it to the authorities of the Islamic Republic, although the warning was ignored. With the outbreak of the Iran–Iraq War, many of the successful aerial and ground operations of the Islamic Republic of Iran Air Force were based on reconnaissance flights conducted by this squadron. One of its most effective missions was identifying the location of Iraq’s floating bridge across the Shatt al-Arab, which was subsequently destroyed by IRIAF Phantoms on 24 May 1982, paving the way for the Liberation of Khorramshahr.
