= Abdolhossein Minusepehr =

Iranian senior fighter pilot and commander

Major General Abdolhossein Minusepehr
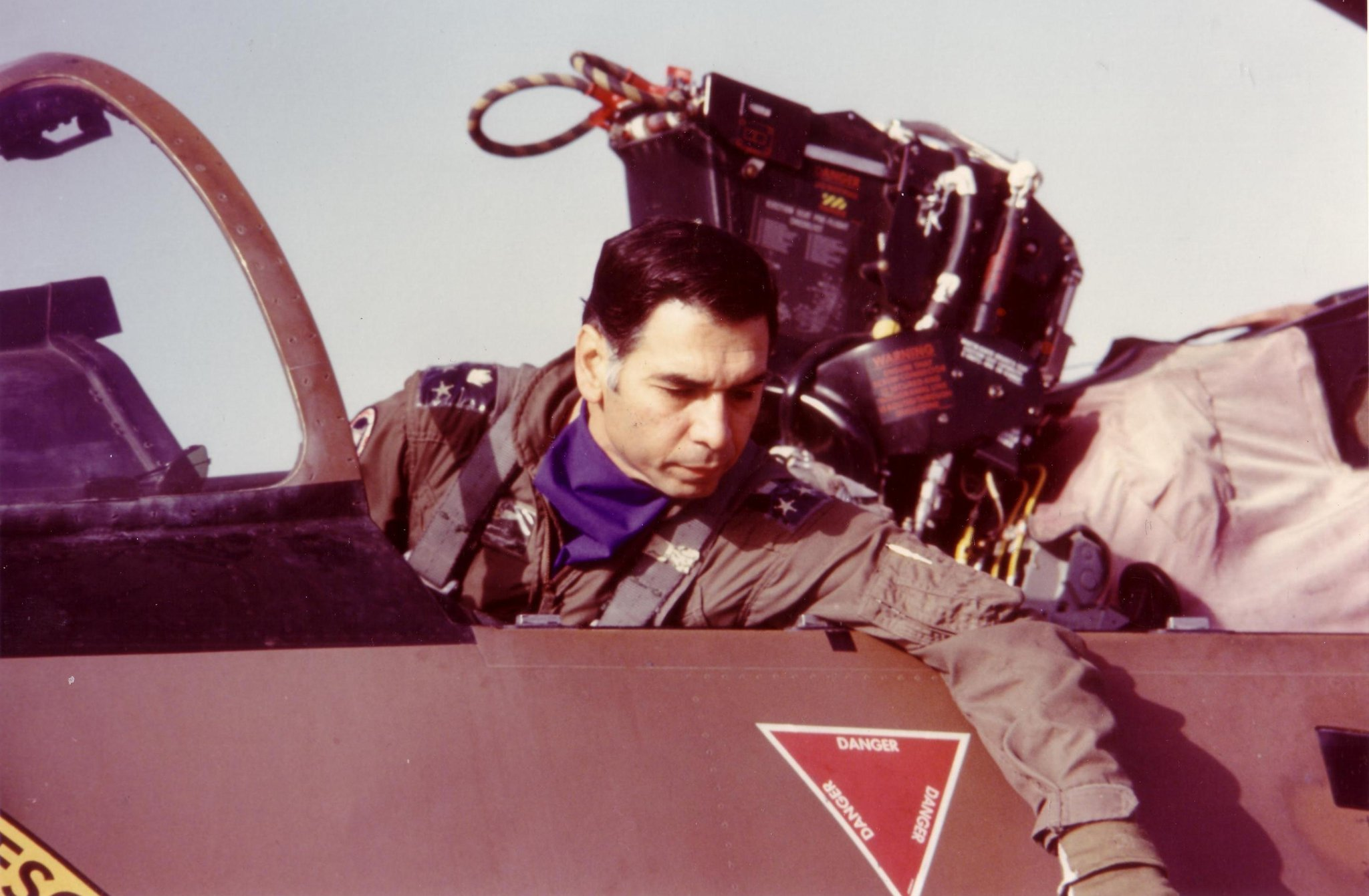
- Major General Minusepehr in the cockpit of an Iranian F-14 Tomcat shortly before an aerobatic demonstration
- Native name: عبدلحسین مینوسپهر
- Born: 1932 (age 93–94); Tehran, Iran
- Allegiance: Iran
- Branch: Imperial Iranian Air Force (IIAF)
- Service years: 1954–1979
- Rank: Major General (Sarlashkar)
- Commands: 202nd TFS Vahdati AFB (Dezful) (F-86); Golden Crown Aerobatic Team (F-86); Chief of Operations, Mehrabad AFB (Tehran) (F-4); Deputy Commander 7th Tactical Fighter Base (Shiraz) (F-4); Commander 7th Tactical Fighter Base (Shiraz) (F-4); Leader F-14 Tomcat Program; Commander Khatami AFB (Isfahan) (F-14)
- Known for: Golden Crown member, early jet fighter instructor, lead Phantom instruction, leader of the Iranian F-14 program

Major General Abdolhossein Minusepehr (Persian: عبدالحسین مینوسپهر ; born 1932) is a former fighter pilot and senior commander in the Imperial Iranian Air Force (IIAF). He was a pioneer of the jet age and the F-4 Phantom era in the IIAF, as well as the leader of the Iranian F-14 Tomcat program. His final appointment was slated to be deputy commander of the Air Force for planning and organization, a position he did not occupy due to the 1979 Islamic Revolution.

== Early life and education ==
Minusepehr was born in 1932 in Tehran, where he grew up and completed his primary education and high school. His military career began in 1951 when he joined the Air Force and enrolled in the Iranian Air Force Academy's pilot training branch.

== Military career ==
Minusepehr's initial flight training included piloting the DeHavilland Tiger Moth and Stearman aircraft. He was commissioned as a second lieutenant in September 1954. Following his commissioning, he continued his advanced pilot training at several United States Air Force bases, including Goodfellow AFB, Marana Air Field, and San Angelo AFB. He completed the comprehensive "55E" training program and earned certification as a multi-engine pilot.

Upon returning to Iran, Minusepehr was assigned to the fighter regiment at Ghalemorghi Base, where he flew the P-47 Thunderbolt fighter aircraft.

=== Jet aircraft transition and NATO service ===
In 1956, Lieutenant Minusepehr was among an elite group of 15 Iranian pilots selected for deployment to Fürstenfeldbruck Air Base in West Germany for jet aircraft transition training. This group included Colonel Mohammad Khatami, who would later become the IIAF Commander. After completing the initial course, Minusepehr was selected for additional training to qualify as an instructor pilot. He and First Lieutenant Siamak Jahanbini were subsequently chosen to remain in USAF 7330 Flight Training (MDGAP) in West Germany to serve as instructors for NATO pilot officers, representing Iran's growing integration with Western military structures during the Cold War.

=== Return to Iran and aerobatic team leadership ===
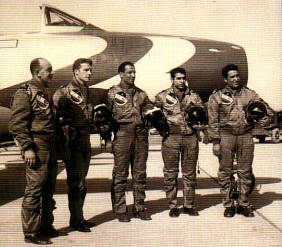
The inaugural IIAF Golden Crown aerobatic team in 1958. L-R: Capt. Siamak Jahanbini, Major Nader Jahanbani, Brig. General Mohammad Khatami, Lt. Abdolhossein Minusepehr, Capt. Amirhossein Rabii

Upon returning to Iran in 1956, Minusepehr began flying the newly acquired F-84G Thunderjet. His flying skills earned him a spot as a founding member in the newly formed Golden Crown aerobatic team, where he flew in number two position behind team leader, Major Nader Jahanbani. He later assumed command of the team, leading it for two years while stationed at the 2nd Tactical Fighter Base (Vahdati Air Base) in Dezful, flying the F-86 Sabre.

=== Advanced military training ===
As his career progressed, Captain Minusepehr attended several advanced leadership training courses, including the U.S. Air Force Squadron Officers School (SOS) and the United Kingdom's Royal Air Force Staff College in Andover, further developing his strategic military leadership capabilities.

=== F-4 Phantom program ===
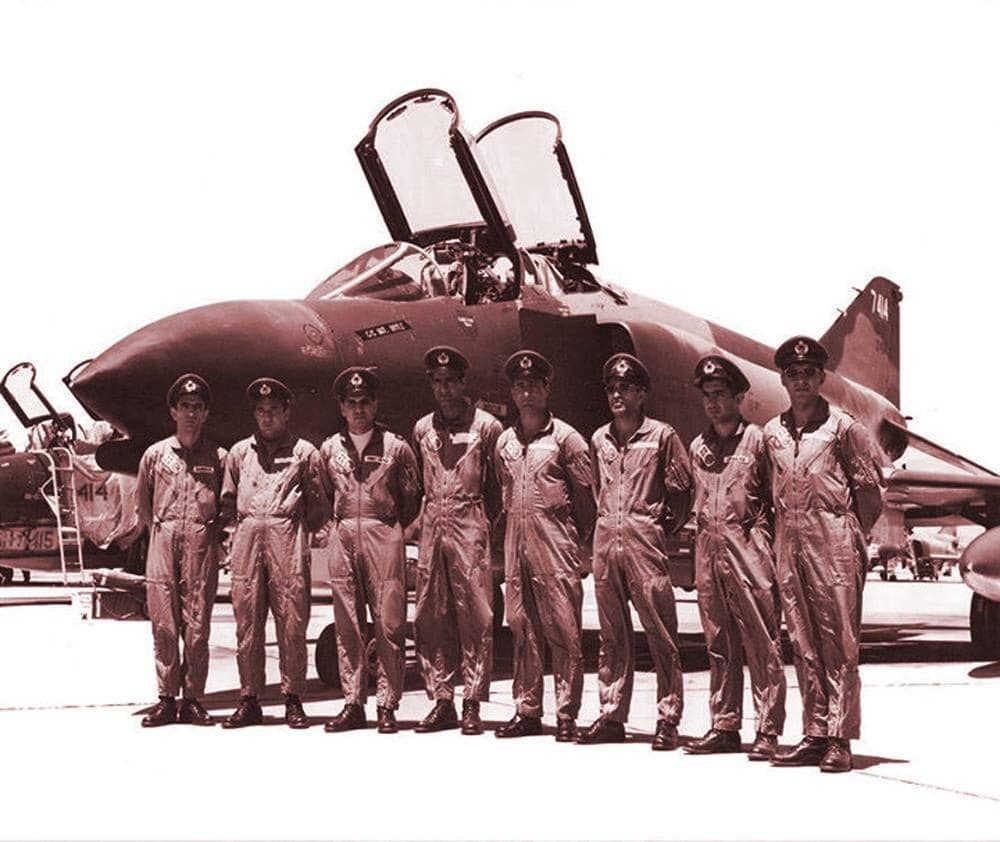
The first 8 IIAF Phantom instructor pilots in Davis Monthan AFB in 1968 L to R: Capt. Banifazl, Capt. Razavi, Major Minusepehr (leader), Capt. Riahi, Capt. Gheidian, Capt. Daneshmandi, Capt. Shahlaee, Capt. Houshyar

In the 1960s, when Iran became one of the first two foreign customers (alongside the United Kingdom) to acquire the McDonnell Douglas F-4 Phantom II, Major Minusepehr was selected to lead a group of eight Iranian pilots to Davis-Monthan Air Force Base for F-4 training and air-to-air interception exercises alongside British and American counterparts.

After returning to Iran, Minusepehr helped establish new Phantom fighter squadrons and implemented training programs for them. During this period, General Khatami, the IIAF commander, completed the transition course, and insisted on exploring and probing the advanced aircraft's limits. Towards this end, together they conducted test flights, and set a world record for the Phantom when they achieved a speed of Mach 2.23 and a sustained altitude of 62,000 feet.

=== CENTO coordination role ===
When Iran increased its participation in the Central Treaty Organization (CENTO), a mutual security organization established between Iran, Pakistan, Turkey, and the United Kingdom (with the United States as an associate member), General Minusepehr emerged as a key figure in regional military cooperation. He served as the Iranian Air Force Coordinator for CENTO activities, facilitating joint training exercises, standardization of procedures, and interoperability between the air forces of member nations. This role highlighted his diplomatic skills alongside his military expertise.

=== Command positions ===
From his early career as a first lieutenant through his promotion to lieutenant colonel, Minusepehr consistently served in multiple squadron commander positions, including the 202nd Tactical Fighter Squadron (TFS) in Dezful. As he rose through the ranks, he was appointed chief of operations at the First Tactical Fighter Base in Tehran, before being promoted to deputy commander and later commander of the 7th Tactical Fighter Base in Shiraz, which operated F-4 Phantoms.

In January 1979, Major General Minusepehr was transferred to Air Force Headquarters with the intention of transitioning in the future into the position of deputy commander for planning and budget. However, due to events of the revolution, this transition never occurred.

=== F-14 Tomcat program ===
When the IIAF selected the advanced Grumman F-14 Tomcat for its long-range air defense capability, Brigadier General Minusepehr was appointed as the project manager for this strategic program. He had been a principal advocate for the selection of this aircraft over the McDonnell Douglas F-15A Eagle for Iran's complex and challenging air defense requirements, making Iran the sole overseas operator of the Tomcat. He oversaw the entire project implementation and assumed command of the 8th Tactical Fighter Base in Isfahan (later renamed Khatami Air Base), which became the home base for Iran's Tomcat fleet.

As project manager for the F-14 program, he was responsible for building the Isfahan base from zero, transforming it into the most potent air base in the region. His leadership turned this installation into a strategic military asset with advanced capabilities unlike any other in the area.

In 1978, while serving as major general and base commander in Isfahan, he personally demonstrated the capabilities of the F-14 Tomcat in an air show performed before a large audience including the royal family, showcasing both his continued piloting excellence and the aircraft's strategic importance.

The decision to choose the Tomcat and the rapid buildup of its air wings under Minusepehr proved fateful and historically significant for Iran, as it was crucial in protecting vital airspace and strategic operations and infrastructure years later in the Iran-Iraq war, thus helping prevent Iran's total collapse. Iran continues to fly this aircraft over 50 years later as the sole remaining Tomcat operator worldwide.

=== Flight experience and safety recognition ===
Throughout his career, Major General Minusepehr accumulated over 8,000 flight hours on fixed-wing aircraft, excluding additional time in liaison aircraft and helicopters. His exceptional safety record was recognized with a prestigious award from the IIAF for achieving 5,000 hours of accident-free flying in jet aircraft, demonstrating his extraordinary skill, discipline, and commitment to flight safety protocols.

=== Contributions to civil aviation ===
Parallel to his military career, General Minusepehr played a vital role in developing Iran's civil aviation sector. He was an active pilot for Air Taxi, helping to establish reliable civil air transport services within Iran. Additionally, he was a contributive figure in the Imperial Aero Club, where he worked alongside General Rafaat, the director of the Imperial Aero Club. His involvement helped promote civilian aviation activities in Isfahan, bridging the military and civilian aviation communities during a period of rapid modernization in both sectors.

== Post-revolution activities ==
Following the Islamic Revolution in Iran, the Imperial Iranian Air Force was dismantled. Major General Minusepehr retired in February 1979. In August of that year, he was offered the position of Air Force Commander under the new Islamic government but declined and subsequently left Iran for the United States. He joined forces with General Bahram Ariana to advise, organize, plan, and coordinate military operations against the Islamic republic.

=== Aviation education career ===
Minusepehr later joined Grumman Aerospace Corporation as a training consultant to develop and refine training curricula for an air academy in Kuwait. He subsequently enrolled at National University in San Diego and earned Master of Business Administration degree from there in 1990. While pursuing this degree, he also served as Aviation program coordinator and professor at the same university, teaching aviation courses at both undergraduate and graduate levels at its Los Angeles campus.

Minusepehr's career spans one of the most transformative periods in Iranian military history, on which he had a deep and lasting impact. He helped and/or led the ushering in of three major transitions - the jet age, the Phantom era, and the Tomcat era. His contributions to the development of the Imperial Iranian Air Force included pioneering roles in the introduction of advanced fighter aircraft, leadership of elite aerobatic demonstrations, and strategic management of Iran's most sophisticated air defense acquisitions. His expertise in both tactical operations and strategic planning helped establish the IIAF as one of the most capable air forces in the Middle East prior to the 1979 revolution. As such, he has been mentioned in both official written and oral history accounts of the Iranian Air Force, including Colonel Fereidoon Izadseta's book Immortals of the Sky. The training programs, operational doctrines, and strategic frameworks that Minusepehr helped establish continued to influence the post-revolutionary Iranian Air Force, contributing to its capabilities during the Iran–Iraq War (1980–1988). His work is particularly credited with laying the groundwork that enabled successful operations such as the H-3 airstrike, considered to be one of the most successful tactical air operations of the war. His legacy extends beyond his military service, encompassing his subsequent work in opposition planning, aerospace training, and aviation education.
