= Project Dark Gene =

1960s and 1970s CIA Iran-based aerial reconnaissance program

- Part of the Cold War
Date	1960s-1970s
Location	Pahlavi Iran, Soviet Union
Result	Assumed discovery of usable intelligence, then superseded and made redundant by the Iranian Revolution.

Belligerents
United States; Pahlavi Iran	Soviet Union

Commanders and leaders
(United States) Richard Secord (Pahlavi Iran) Mohammad Reza Pahlavi	(Soviet Union) Nikita Khrushchev (Soviet Union) Leonid Brezhnev (Soviet Union) Pavel S. Kutakhov

Strength
Imperial Iranian Air Force	Soviet Air Forces

Casualties and losses
USA & Iran: IIAF Major Shokouhnia and USAF Colonel John Saunders captured and later released; 1 RF-4C, 1 RF-5B, 2 CH-47 confirmed; In total, 6 aircraft possibly lost	USSR: Captain Gennadii N. Eliseev killed; 1 MiG-21

Project Dark Gene was an aerial reconnaissance program run by the Central Intelligence Agency and Imperial Iranian Air Force from bases inside Pahlavi Iran against the Soviet Union. The program was run in conjunction with Project Ibex, which was a more traditional ELINT mission. The first operations were during the 1960s with support of Iran's former Shah. Dedicated aircraft, air-bases, and U.S. personnel were stationed at numerous sites in Iran and would regularly fly across the border into the USSR through potential holes in their radar coverage. The intention of the program was to test the effectiveness of Soviet air defence and interception and resulted in one confirmed and possibly more combat losses in engagements with Soviet aircraft.

== Operation details and background ==
Direct confrontation between the US and USSR was occurring or brewing in places like Indochina. Confrontation was usually limited to proxy wars often involving the use of advisers, trainers, and other specialised personnel of the proxy states. After the Korean War the USA undertook a series of direct reconnaissance flights over the Soviet Union, some at the time secret and highly successful and others that resulted in shootdowns and tense diplomacy such as the 1960 U-2 incident. In order to continue gathering intelligence the USA needed to develop more and more sophisticated methods as the Soviet defences became more advanced. Developments like the SR-71 Blackbird and satellites were fueled by this.

The Shah of Iran, a U.S. ally, offered to fund military intelligence operations against the USSR as part of the Cold War. The Shah feared the Soviet Union, in particular their relationship with neighbouring rival Iraq.

According to US Embassy cables during the operations the Shah and Iran were of great importance to the US, in part due to the close relations with the Iranian government and Iran's proximity to the USSR. In response to a request by the Shah to speed up a similar arms deal the US Embassy in Tehran advised; "Decision should also not overlook or underestimate importance of Iran for vital US national interests." The Embassy suggested that deliveries of an aircraft type to European Allies and even to the USAF should be considered for diversion to Iran due to the strength of this relationship and the urgency of the issue.

Operation Dark Gene and Operation Ibex were two ways the Iranians could help due to their strategic location, between the USSR and the Persian Gulf. The terrain (deep valleys) in the area offered the program a unique advantage as Soviet radar coverage had major holes. At first US pilots flying Iranian aircraft operated independently but over time Iranian personnel became more involved.

At a point during the operations, due to the risk of pilots ejecting over the USSR, excuses were worked out to explain why US pilots were found flying combat aircraft over the Soviet Union. The excuse they settled on was that the USAF pilots were training IIAF pilots in their new aircraft and simply got lost. Typically by this stage an Iranian would pilot while a USAF officer would navigate.

As the operations continued, the US provided the Iranian Air Force with advanced aircraft that were not offered to anyone else at the time such as the F-14. These operations ended with the Iranian Revolution and it is assumed that the ELINT equipment was ceded to the successor Islamic Republic of Iran Air Force.

=== Project Ibex ===
Project Ibex was closely linked to Project Dark Gene. The same airfields were used and operations were often run in conjunction. In essence they can be considered the same operation, each with separate and overlapping objectives. One of the advantages of operating them together was the ELINT data that could be gathered when Soviet air defences were activated by a Project Dark Gene aircraft that was detected. The resulting emissions and activity would be recorded by Project Ibex aircraft on the Iranian side of the border.

Funded by the Shah, the listening posts were constructed in Northern Iran by the CIA. After the Iranian Revolution, Iran maintained the facilities in "impeccable condition" despite having little or no knowledge about how to operate them. With the potential to provide information about Iraqi troop movements, CIA official George W. Cave advised Iran's interim government to make use of the system.

== Combat ==
Around four aircraft involved in the project may have been lost to Soviet interceptors during the project. Two of the unconfirmed aircraft are RF-5A's piloted by USAF pilots, while a RF-5B with an IIAF pilot, one a reconnaissance mission is confirmed.

=== Detailed incident ===
One instance of combat during Project Dark Gene was an engagement on November 28, 1973 between an RF-4C aircraft piloted by IIAF Major Shokouhnia and backseater USAF Colonel John Saunders and a Soviet MiG-21 flown by Captain Gennadii N. Eliseev. The Soviet pilot fired two Vympel K-13 missiles at the Iranian aircraft, failing to destroy it. He was ordered from ground control to press his attack at any cost, and with his cannon jammed after the first shot, he continued by ramming into the Iranian aircraft and losing his life in the process. He struck the RF-4C's tail assembly with his wing and then flew into high ground. It was the first deliberate jet-to-jet ramming by a Soviet aircraft during an interception, a practice common in the propeller age of World War II. Eliseev was posthumously awarded as a Hero of the Soviet Union. The crew of the RF-4C aircraft were captured by Soviet ground forces and released after 16 days.

=== Similar incidents ===
In 1978, 4 Iranian Chinooks strayed into the Soviet Union while training. One was damaged and one shot down by a Soviet pilot in a MiG-23 Flogger. The interception was possibly due to Project Dark Gene as the Soviets had increased their air defences on the Iranian border in response to prior incursions.

== Equipment ==
Airbases involved were operated jointly by the CIA and IIAF and protected by land mines and razor wire. As part of the connection with IBEX there were 5 dedicated facilities for monitoring communications within the Soviet Union. Their contact with the outside world was maintained by air resupply only via de Havilland Canada DHC-4 aircraft. Special equipment was provided by Rockwell International and funding was largely provided by the Shah of Iran.

Most of the following aircraft had custom electronic warfare packages installed for their missions. The Boeing 707s, for example, had 13 man crews operating internal surveillance equipment. Broad- and narrow-band receivers were used.

- McDonnell Douglas RF-4C/E
- Northrop RF-5A
- Boeing 707
- Lockheed C-130H
- de Havilland Canada DHC-4
