= Yadollah Sharifirad =

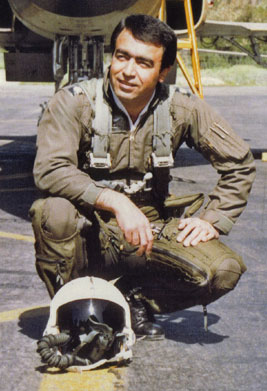
- Born: 24 March 1946 (age 80); Taleqan, Iran
- Military career
- Allegiance: Iran
- Branch: Air Force
- Conflicts: Iran–Iraq War
- Other work: Military attaché at Pakistan (1984–87)

Yadollah Sharifirad (Persian: یدالله شریفی‌راد) (born 24 March 1946, in Taleqan) is an Iranian former fighter pilot, former military attaché and writer. In 1978, he was a member of Golden Crown aerobatic team. Sharifirad was one of the most successful Iranian Northrop F-5 pilots during the Iran–Iraq War. He shot down five Iraqi fighter aircraft (three confirmed and two possible). The victories include one Su-22 and four MiG-21s. In an air raid on an Iraqi power station, he was attacked by three Iraqi fighters and shot down. He ejected and was returned to Iran by Iraqi Kurdish guerrillas. A movie called Eagles was made about this event.

From 1984 until 1987, Sharifirad served as a military attaché in Pakistan. In 1987, he was ordered back to Iran by the government; upon his return, Sharifirad was accused of spying for the United States and imprisoned for over a year before being released. Sharifirad then escaped to Canada.

In 2010, Sharifirad wrote a book titled Flight of a Patriot, recounting the story of his life from his youth until his participation in the Iran-Iraq war, his arrest, imprisonment and torture, and immigration to Canada.

== See also ==
- Iran–Pakistan relations
- Nader Jahanbani
- Iranian Revolution
- Iranian Canadians
- List of Iranian aerial victories during the Iran–Iraq war
