= Eagles (1985 film) =

Eagles عقاب‌ها
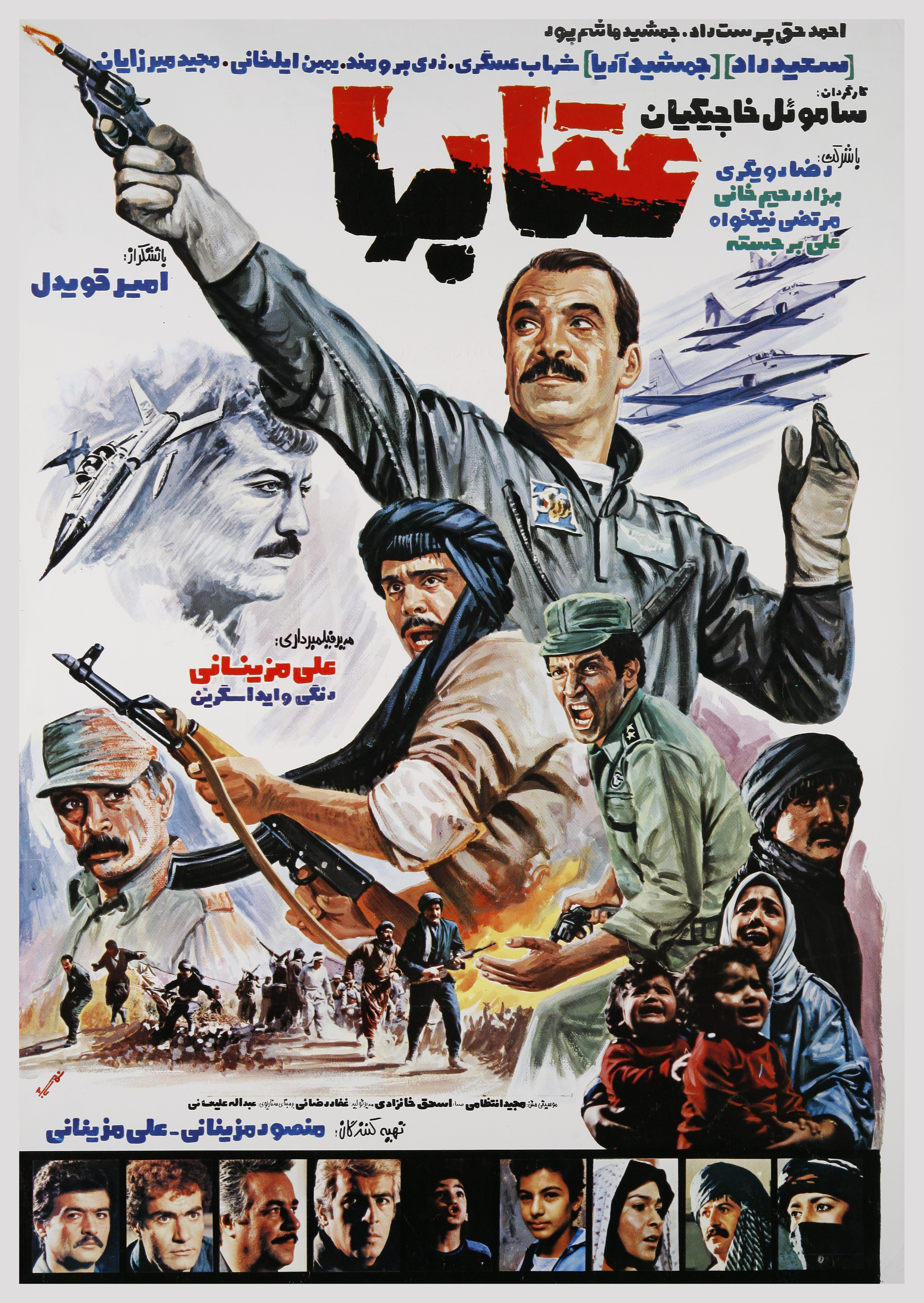
- Theatrical release poster
- Directed by: Samuel Khachikian
- Written by: Mohammad Reza Yousefi
- Story by: Abdollah AliKhani
- Produced by: Ali Mazinani and Mansoor Mazinani
- Starring: Saeed Rad; Jamshid Hashempour; Zari Broumand; Shahab Asgari; Reza Rooygari
- Cinematography: Ali Mazinani
- Edited by: Samuel Khachikian
- Music by: Majid Entezami
- Release date: 4 August 1985
- Running time: 95 minutes
- Country: Iran
- Language: Persian

Eagles (Persian: عقاب‌ها) is a 1985 Iranian film about an Iranian pilot, Yadollah Sharifirad, whose aircraft shot down by Iraqi Air Force during Iran–Iraq War. The story is about his escape back to Iran. This film is considered the first major war movie in Iranian cinema. It is estimated that 18 percent of Iranian population watched the movie at the time.

== Cast ==
- Saeed Rad
- Jamshid Hashempour
- Zari Broumand
- Shahab Asgari
- Reza Rooygari
- Morteza Nikkhah
- Behzad Rahimkhani

== Release ==
Eagles (1985 film)

Eagles is first released at August 4, 1985 in Iran.
