= Ayat Mohaqeqi =

Iranian military commander (1931–1980)

Timsar Ayat Mohaqeqi
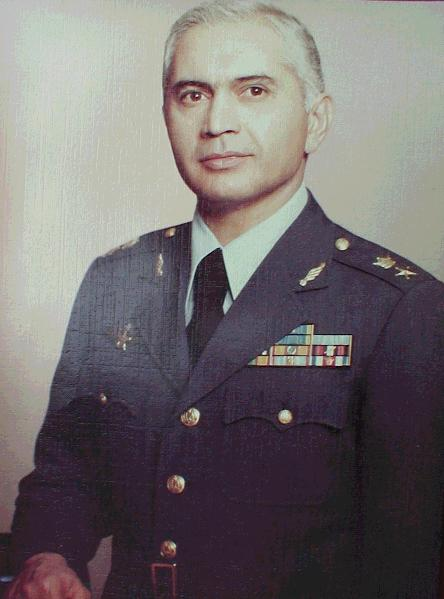
- Born: December 25, 1931
- Died: July 19, 1980 (aged 48)
- Allegiance: Iran
- Branch: Imperial Iranian Air Force
- Service years: 1949-1980
- Rank: Brigadier general
- Conflicts: Nojeh Coup

Ayat Mohaqeqi (Persian: آیت محققی; December 25, 1931 - July 19, 1980) was a pilot brigadier general of the F-4 Phantom 2 of the Imperial Iranian Air Force, the commander of the Mehrabad 1st hunting base, and a member of the Golden Crown acrobat team. After the 1979 Iranian Revolution, he was a member of the leadership council of the Nojeh coup, known as the "Niqab Uprising," which was arrested, tried, and executed on July 19, 1980, after the coup was discovered.

== Coup ==
Together with General Saeed Mehdiyoun and several officers of the Imperial Iranian Air Force, namely Bijan Irannejad, Farrokhzad Jahangiri, Mohammad Malek and Yousef Pourrezaei, he planned to overthrow and Shapur Bakhtiar destroy the political system of the Islamic Republic. With the revelation of the coup plan and plan, on the morning of July 9, 1980, while all the pilots and officers participating in the coup were preparing to start the operation by going to Shahrokhi Air Base in Hamadan, he was arrested, tried and finally shot on July 19, 1980. Excerpts from his trial were recorded.
