= Yadollah Javadpour =

Iranian fighter pilot

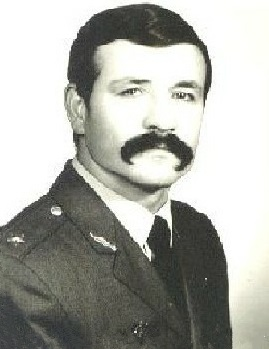
- Military career
- Allegiance: Iran
- Branch: Islamic Republic of Iran Air Force
- Conflicts: Iran–Iraq War

Yadollah Javadpour (Persian: یدالله جوادپور) was a fighter pilot flying Northrop F-5 Tiger II in the Islamic Republic of Iran Air Force, serving for the duration of the Iran–Iraq War. According to some sources, his record qualifies him as an ace. French military historian Pierre Razoux has credited him with three aerial victories. He immigrated to North America after he was retired.

== Career ==
He began his service as a pilot in the IIAF and was a member of the elite flight demonstration team, the Golden Crown.

=== Iran–Iraq War ===
Javadpour's notoriety came while flying the Northrop F-5. He claimed 5 air victories, which makes him an ace, but only two have been reliably confirmed by western sources. His greatest fame came on August 6, 1983 when he claimed (later to be reliably confirmed) to have shot down an Iraqi MiG-25. This was a significant achievement for an F-5 pilot as the MiG-25 is a much bigger and faster aircraft with a substantial altitude advantage. His other confirmed kill was an Su-20 on 17 October 1980.

Air Combat Information Group (ACIG) gives credit of the following confirmed kills to Javadpour:

#	Date	Unit	Weapon	Victim	Ref
1	17 October 1980	TFB 2	20mm	Su-20	
2	6 August 1983	TFB 2	AIM-9J	MiG-25RB	

== See also ==
- Iranian aerial victories during the Iran-Iraq war
