= Amanullah Mirza Jahanbani =

Iranian general

Amanullah Mirza Jahanbani امان‌الله میرزا جهانبانی
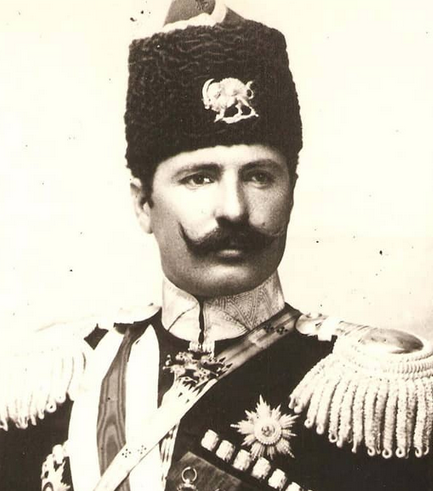
- Amanullah Mirza Jahanbani in the late 19th century.
- Born: 1869; Tehran, Qajar Iran
- Died: 1912 (aged 42–43); Tabriz, Qajar Iran
- Issue: Amanullah Jahanbani
- Dynasty: Qajar

Military service
- Allegiance: Qajar Iran
- Branch/service: Persian Cossack Brigade
- Years of service: 1885–1906

Amanullah Mirza Jahanbani (Persian: امان‌الله میرزا جهانبانی, romanized: Amanullah Mirza Jahanbani; 1869, Tehran - 1912, Tabriz) was an Iranian constitutionalist, general, statesman and a prominent prince of the Qajar dynasty. Jahanbani served as the senior officer of the Persian Cossack Brigade from 1885 till 1906, after which he served as a member of the 1st Iranian Majlis. He ultimately became the governor of Tabriz, a title which he held from 1909 until 1912, when the Russian occupation of Tabriz led to his suicide.

== Early life ==
Amanullah Mirza Jahanbani was born in 1869 in Tehran, then home to the court of the Qajar dynasty. He was a paternal grandson of Seyfollah Mirza, the 42nd son of Fath-Ali Shah Qajar and his Georgian concubine, Golbadan Baji.

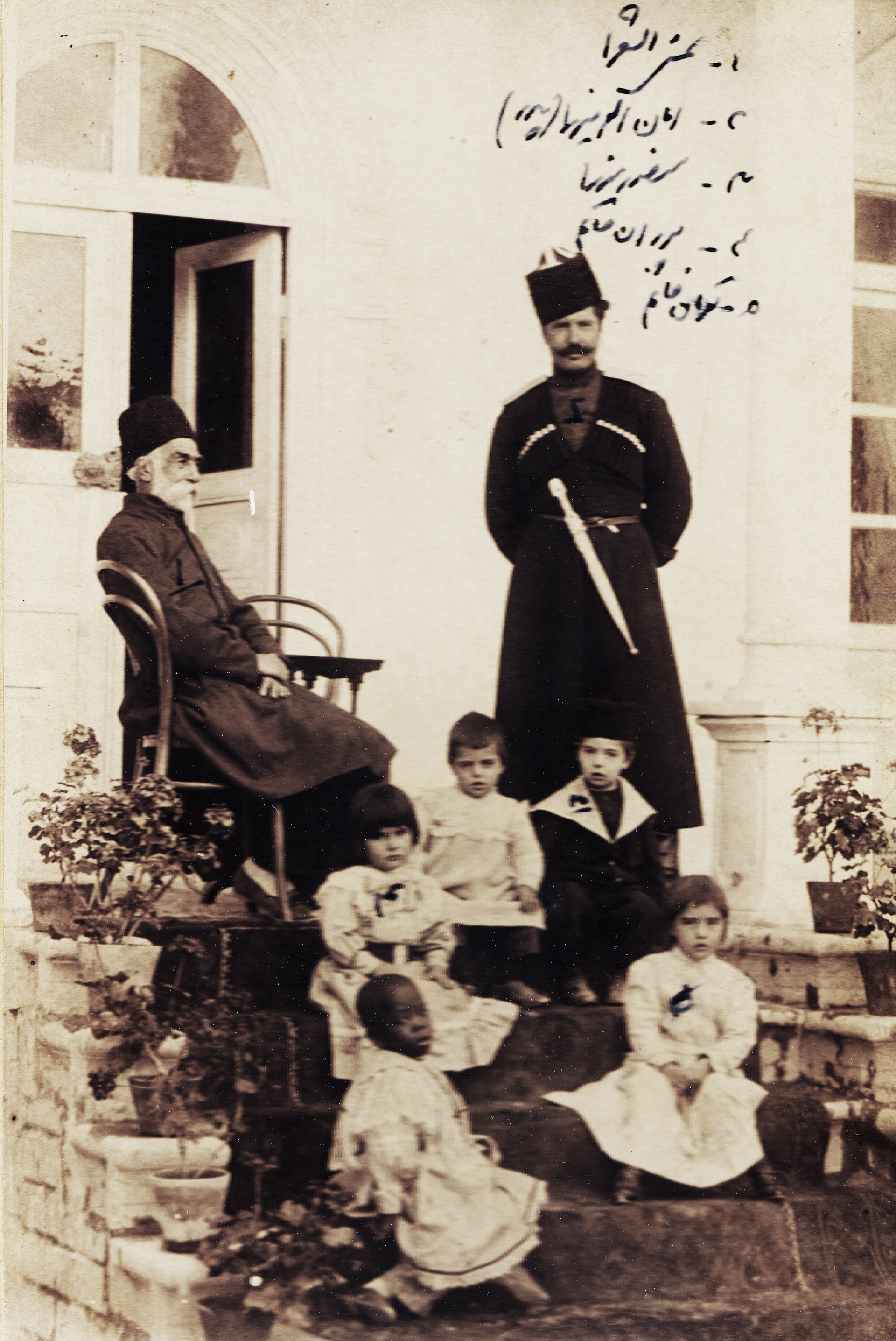
Amanullah Mirza (standing) with his godfather, his children and an Afro-Iranian child slave.

As a member of the nobility, he received a military-oriented education typical for Qajar princes during the late 19th century, which emphasized training influenced by Russian military models due to growing Russian influence in Persia.
