= Bahram Hooshyar =

Iran Air Force General (1938–1991)

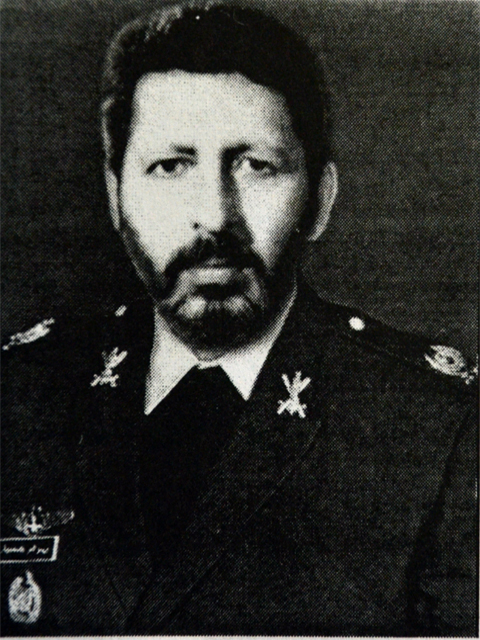
- General Bahram Hooshyar
- Born: 1938; Tehran, Imperial State of Iran
- Died: 1991 (aged 52–53); Tehran, Iran
- Burial place: Behesht-e Zahra, Tehran
- Military career
- Allegiance: Imperial State of Iran; Islamic Republic of Iran
- Branch: Air Forces
- Service years: 1964–1991
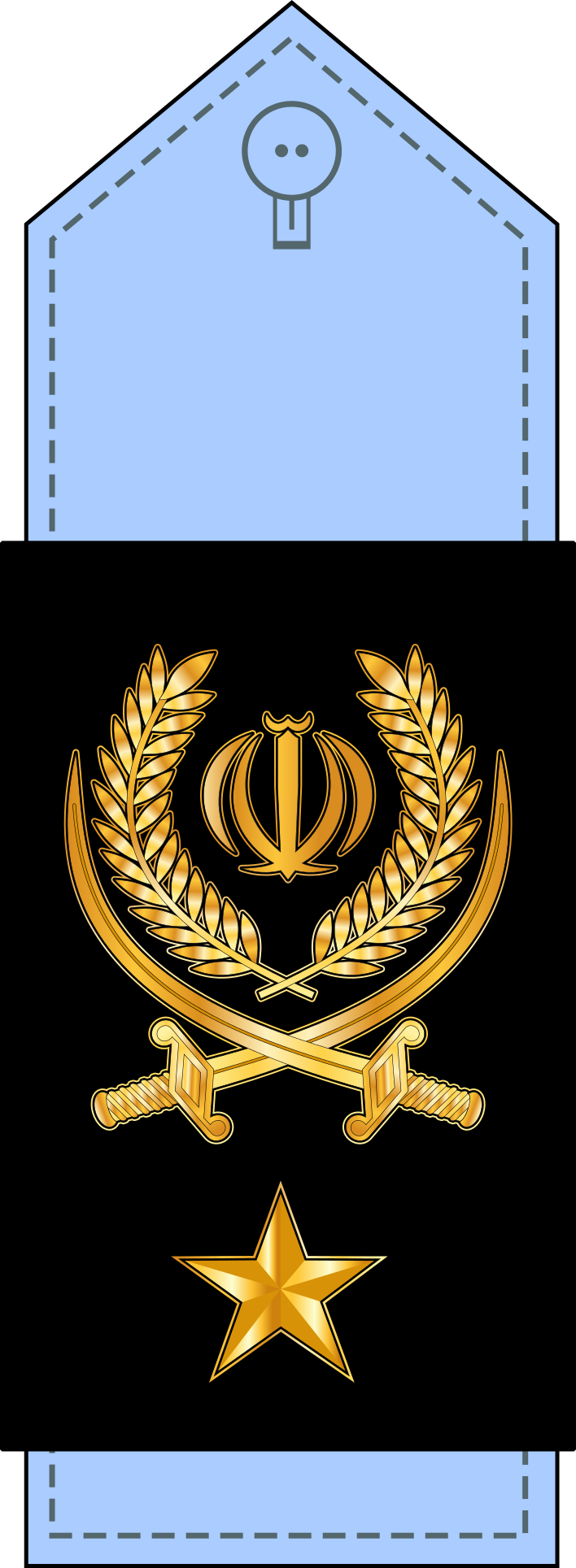
- Rank: Brigadier General
- Nickname: General Hooshyar
- Commands: Golden Crown aerobatic jet team Special Operations Command South; Air Force operations
- Conflicts: Iran–Iraq War
- Awards: Air Force Distinguished Conquest Medal
- Other work: Pilot of F-86 Sabre, F-4, F-5

Bahram Hooshyar (Persian: بهرام هشیار) (1938–1991) was an Iranian commander in the Islamic Republic of Iran Air Force (IRIAF) and an important strategist in the Iran–Iraq War.

== Operations ==
=== Attack on H3 ===
General Hooshyar had a key role along with Major General Javad Fakouri in the Attack on H3 (Attack on Al-Waleed).

=== Operation Samen-ol-A'emeh ===
He also was involved in the planning of Operation Samen-ol-A'emeh, and also was an innovator of Iran's plan for launching missiles in battle.

== Innovations ==
He for the first time established and started Khyber missile site (Foley Islamabad) along with some armored divisions operating in Qazvin.

== Death ==
He died in Tehran in 1991 after a long battle with cancer. Like many soldiers serving in the Iran-Iraq War, he was diagnosed with leukemia. His sculpture at the Museum of the Air Force is on display as one of Iran's symbols of the Iran–Iraq War.
