= Nader Jahanbani =

Iranian fighter pilot and general (1928–1979)

Timsar Nader Jahanbani
- نادر جهانبانی
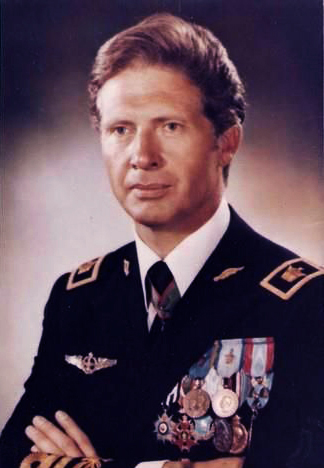
- Jahanbani in 1970s

Director of Physical Education Organization
- In office 7 August 1977 – 11 February 1979
- Monarch: Mohammad Reza Pahlavi
- Prime Minister: Jamshid Amouzegar; Jafar Sharif-Emami; Gholam Reza Azhari; Shapour Bakhtiar
- Preceded by: Ali Hojjat Kashani
- Succeeded by: Hossein Fekri

Deputy Commander for Planning and Organization of the Imperial Iranian Air Force
- In office 1971 – 11 February 1979
- Monarch: Mohammad Reza Pahlavi
- Prime Minister: Amir-Abbas Hoveyda; Jamshid Amouzegar; Jafar Sharif-Emami; Gholam Reza Azhari; Shapour Bakhtiar

Deputy Commander of the Air Training Command of the Imperial Iranian Air Force
- In office 1963–1971
- Monarch: Mohammad Reza Pahlavi
- Prime Minister: Asadollah Alam; Hassan Ali Mansur; Amir-Abbas Hoveyda

Personal details
- Born: 16 April 1928 Tehran, Pahlavi Iran
- Died: 13 March 1979 (aged 50) Qasr Prison, Tehran, Iran
- Resting place: Behesht-e Zahra
- Spouse(s): Azar Etesam; Farah Zanganeh
- Relations: Amanullah Jahanbani (father); Amanullah Mirza Jahanbani (grandfather); Khosrow Jahanbani (brother); Shahnaz Pahlavi (sister in-law)
- Children: 2
- Education: Soviet Air Force Academy
- Awards: Order of Aftab; Order of Merit
- Nickname: Blue-eyed General

Military service
- Allegiance: Pahlavi Iran
- Branch/service: Imperial Iranian Air Force
- Years of service: 1950–1979
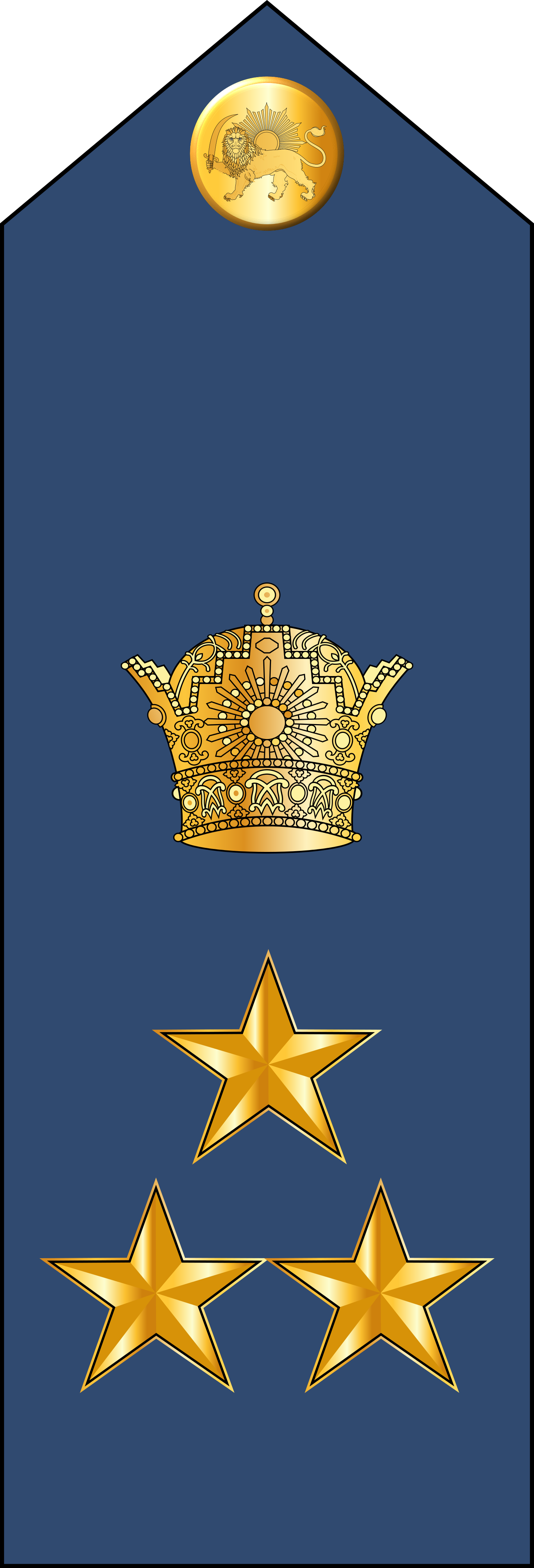
- Rank: Lieutenant General
- Unit: Fighter Brigade Tehran; Golden Crown Aerobatic Team; TFB 1 (Mehrabad) Tehran; TFB 4 (Vahdati) Dezful; Air Training Command; IIAF High Command
- Commands: Fighter Brigade (pilot instruction); Golden Crown Aerobatic Team (founder) (1958–1962,1969); Deputy Wing Commander TFB 4 (Vahdati) Dezful
- Battles/wars: Joint Operation Arvand; Second Iraqi–Kurdish War; 1974–1975 Shatt al-Arab conflict; Iranian Revolution

Nader Mirza Jahanbani (Persian: نادر جهانبانی, romanized: Nāder Jahānbānī; 16 April 1928 – 13 March 1979) was a distinguished general, fighter pilot, and deputy commander of the Imperial Iranian Air Force (IIAF) under Mohammad Reza Pahlavi, the last Shah of Iran. He is widely regarded as one of the founding fathers of the Iranian Air Force along with General Mohammad Khatami and Lieutenant General Amir Hossein Rabii, for growing and modernizing the IIAF to become a world class air force with advanced equipment and training, including the F-14 Tomcat, which would save Iran's crucial infrastructure during the Iran–Iraq War. He was the founder and leader of the Golden Crown, Iran's first and only precision flying demonstration team, and one of the oldest in the world.

== Early life and education ==
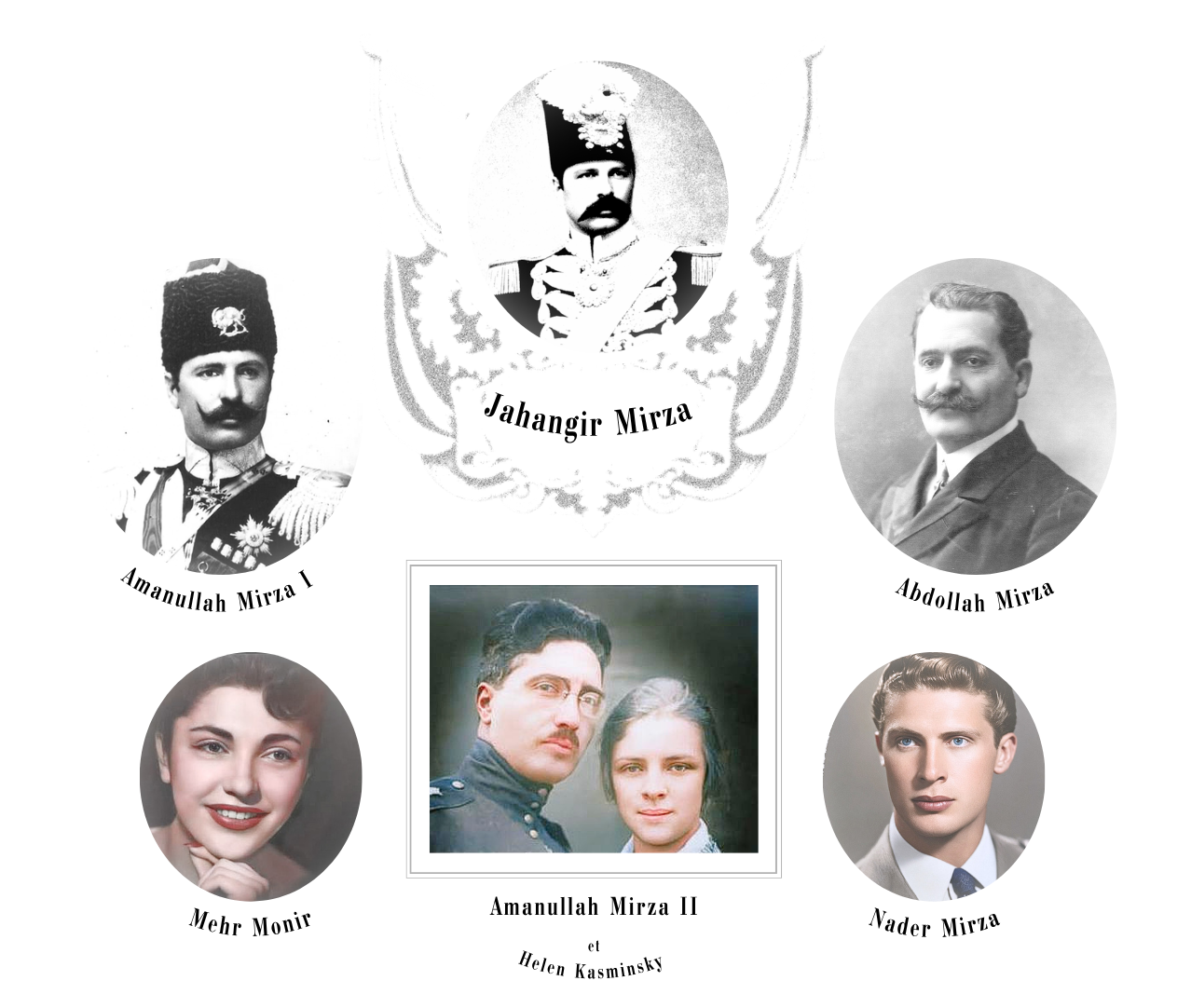
The Jahanbani family; featuring Nader, his grandfather Amanullah Mirza I, his father Amanullah Mirza II and his older sister Mehr Monir Jahanbani.

Nader Jahanbani was born on 16 April 1928 into a family with a long military history. His father, Amanullah Jahanbani, was a lieutenant general, who served in the Persian Cossack Brigade with Reza Shah Pahlavi. He was a Qajar prince, son of Amanullah Mirza Jahanbani and great-grandson of Fath-Ali Shah Qajar. Nader's mother, Helen Kasminsky, was from the Russian aristocracy in Petrograd. From the side of his mother, he had one sister and two brothers. He also had two half sisters and five half brothers.

Amanullah was imprisoned when Nader Jahanbani was 12, but after Reza Shah died, he was released and made a senator by Mohammad Reza Pahlavi. By then, his father sent him to the Russian Air Force Academy, from which he graduated as a foreign cadet.

== Military career ==
=== Entry into the IIAF ===
Having graduated the Russian Air Force Academy at a young age, he entered the IIAF in 1950 as an already trained pilot with the rank of first lieutenant. He trained many other pilots from early on in his career in the IIAF's only fighter brigade (هنگ شکاری) which was based in Ghale Morghi Air Base in Tehran, many of whom went on to become senior officers and commanders.

=== Transition to the Jet Age ===
In 1956, Jahanbani was selected as part of a group of 15 IIAF pilots to be sent to Fürstenfeldbruck Air Base in West Germany to acquire for the first time jet training with NATO pilots under the US Air Force Europe, as Iran was taking delivery of its first jet aircraft - the Republic F-84 Thunderjet fighter and Lockheed T-33 Shooting Star trainer. The group included Colonel (later General) Mohammad Amir Khatami, Lt. (later Lt. General) Amir Hossein Rabii, and Lt. (later Major General) Abdolhossein Minusepehr. Upon completion of the training, 10 pilots returned to Iran while Jahanbani and four others, continued their training to become instructors upon return to Iran. During this time, he forged close ties and friendships with experienced American and NATO pilots, most notably members of the recently formed USAFE Skyblazers aerobatic team, flying the North American F-100 Super Sabres, America's first supersonic fighter jet.

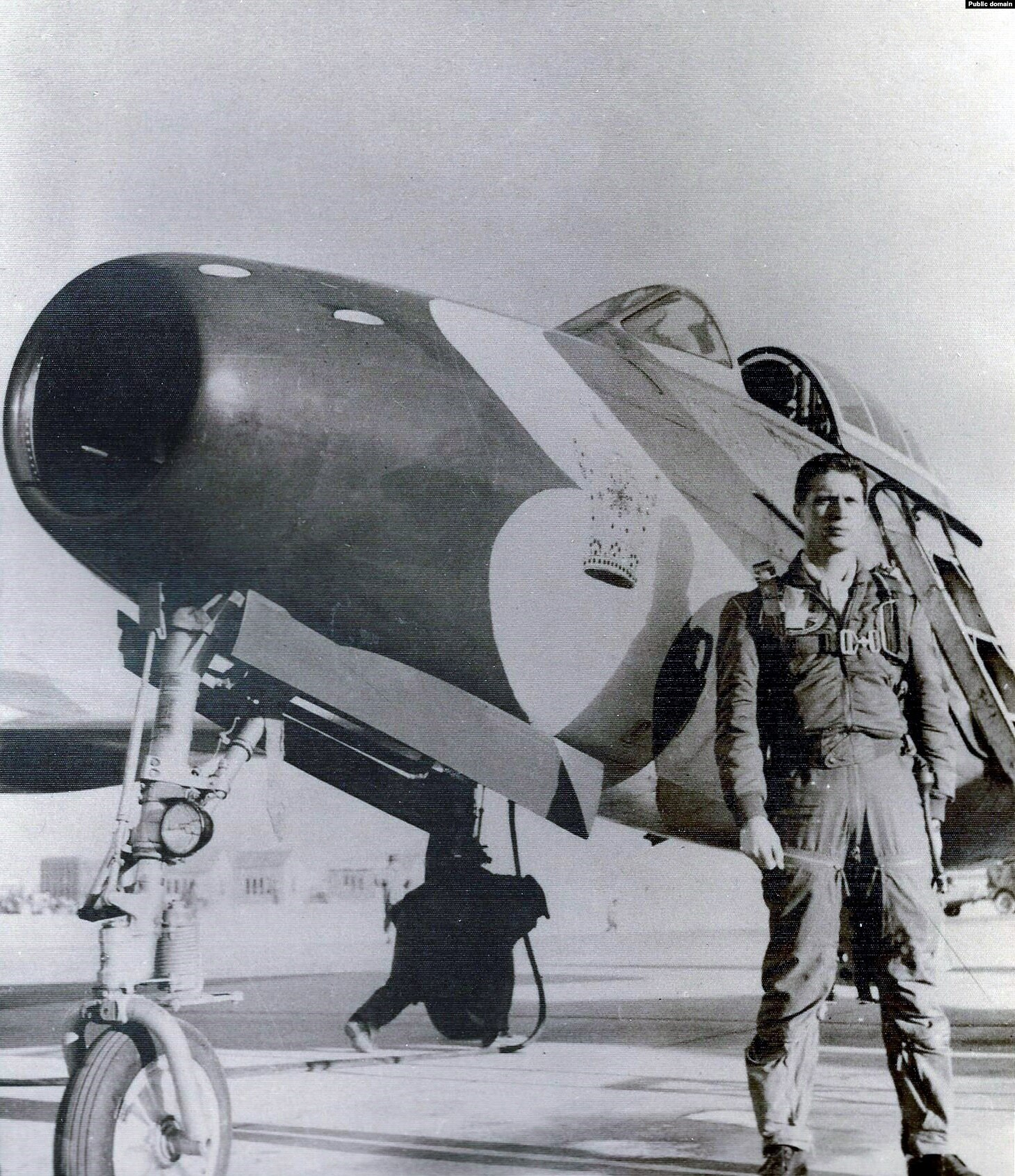
Jahanbani in front of his F-84 Thunderjet

=== Golden Crown ===
After returning to Iran, Jahanbani formed Iran's first and only aerobatic team, the Golden Crown (Taje Talaii) in 1958 together with other officers, including Mohammad Amir Khatami, Amir Hossein Rabii, Siamak Jahanbini, and Abdolhossein Minusepehr, with the support of General Khatami and the Shah. They started flying with F-84 Thunderjets and switched to F-86 Sabres. For the following twenty years, Golden Crown would symbolize Iran's military modernization under the Pahlavi government and set new standards for pilot skill, discipline, formation flying, precision, and teamwork - principles later reflected in the combat-ready IIAF culture during the Iran–Iraq war. Throughout the years, Golden Crown would give joint demonstrations and compete with teams of allied nations, including the USAF Skyblazers, the US Navy Blue Angels, Britain's Royal Air Force, French Air Force (Patrouille de France), and the Italian Air Force.

Upon its founding, Jahanbani led the Golden Crown team from 1958–1962, and then again in 1969 a total of six years, the longest tenure of any Golden Crown leader. He would personally select and evaluate candidates for the team, train them, and challenge their limits. Many of these team members went on to become accomplished pilots, officers, and commanders, some of whom served in the Iran–Iraq War.

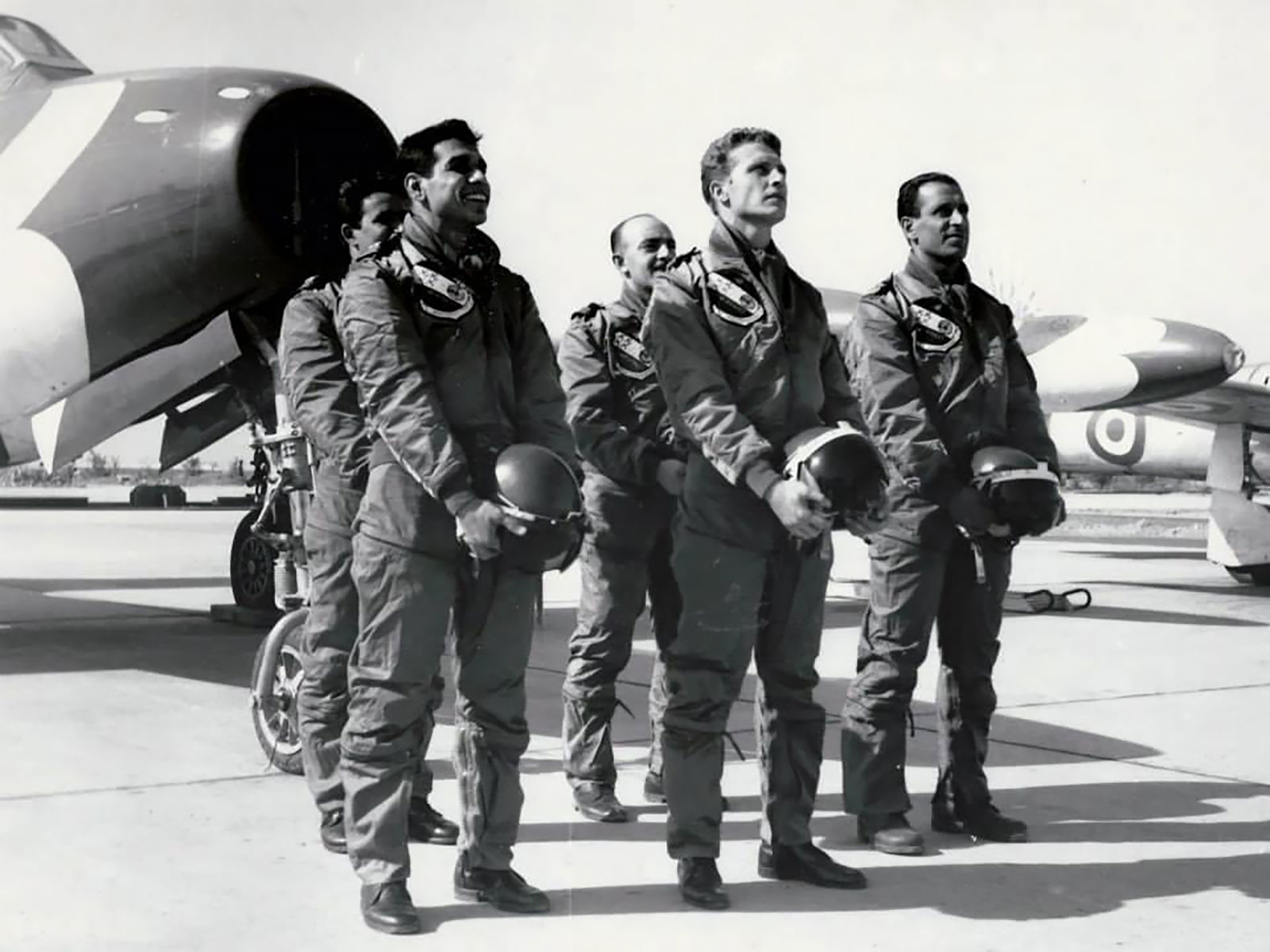
The first IIAF Golden Crown team in 1958, led by Major Jahanbani (front center)

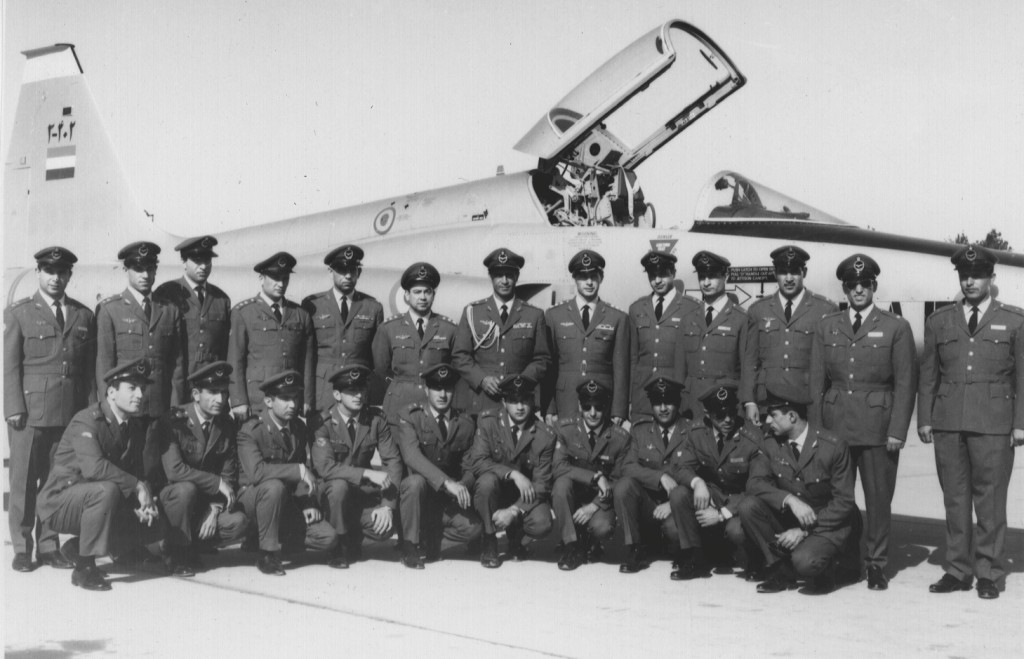
Colonel Jahanbani (standing, 6th from right) next to General Khatami and with other pilots at Tehran's Mehrabad airbase in 1965 in front of a recently delivered F-5 Freedom Fighter.

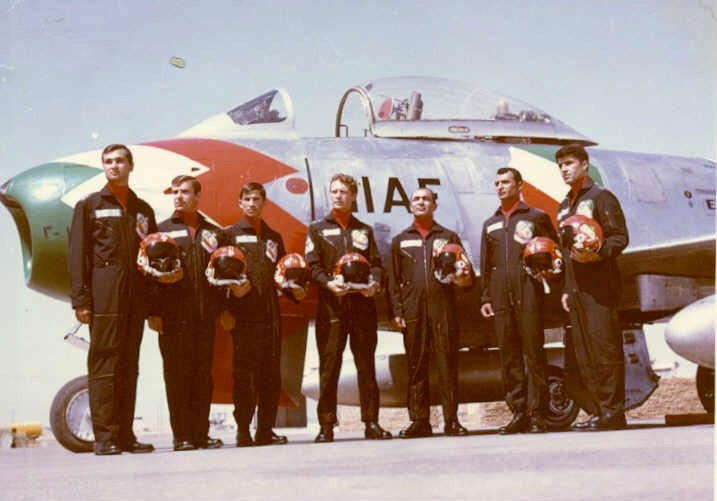
General Jahanbani (center) led the 1969 IIAF Golden Crown team with all new members.

=== Leadership ===
Jahanbani played a crucial role in the Iranian air force during the 1960s and 1970s by helping to create an effective air force. In 1963 Jahanbani went back to pilot training and leadership roles, and was stationed at the IIAF High Command in Tehran. Over the next few years, he would go on to attend advanced leadership training including Air Command and Staff College in the US Air Force. He transferred to the 4th Tactical Fighter Base, known as Vahdati, in Dezful where he became Deputy Wing Commander of that base while also leading the Golden Crown team once again. Throughout this period he flew F-86's and the newly arrived F-5 Freedom Fighter supersonic fighter. During the 1969 Iran Iraq maritime border crisis, Iran conducted Joint Operation Arvand, in which an Iranian vessel navigated the Shatt-al-Arab waterway under the overhead protection of Iranian fighter jets, Jahanbani personally flew and led the aerial combat escort mission. The ship's mission completed peacefully without incident.

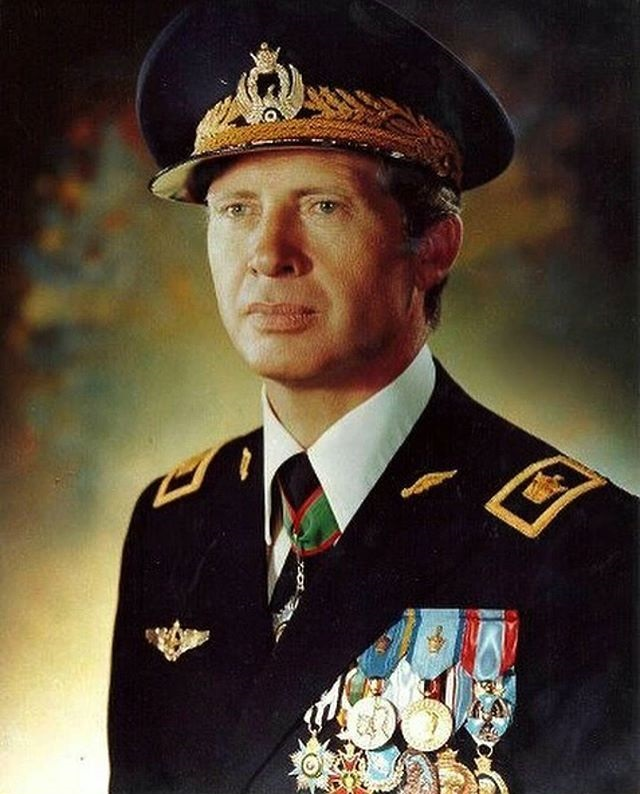
Jahanbani (center) in 1976

He established and ran base wide and IIAF wide gunnery competitions as well as maintenance competitions which measured turnaround and preparation times for fighter aircraft in simulated combat operations. These measures increased combat readiness and operational abilities throughout the IIAF, which had significant impact during the Iran–Iraq War, especially in the beginning when the Iranian Air Force stopped the Iraqi invasion while Iranian ground forces had suffered immense damage from the revolution.

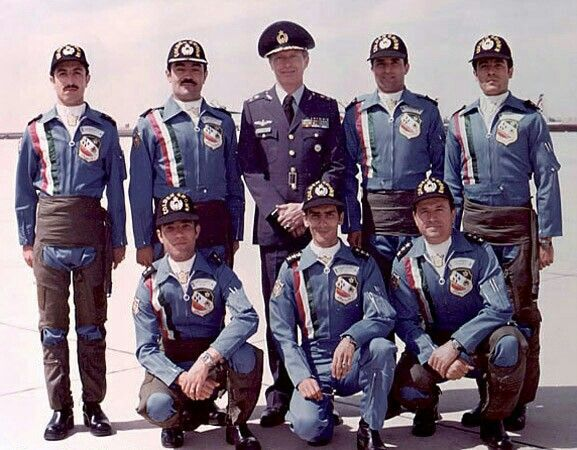
General Jahanbani (rear center) with the last Golden Crown team in the late 1970's

Eventually he returned to Tehran to serve in the IIAF High Command where he played a central role in the IIAF's subsequent advancement in both quality and quantity of air combat and logistical capabilities, overseeing growth from a once small force in the early 1960's to 100,000 personnel by 1979. He continued to emphasize rigorous training and set and maintain high proficiency standards, and helped spearhead the procurement and integration of advanced front line American aircraft, such as the F-4 Phantom II, F-5 Freedom Fighter/Tiger II, and F-14 Tomcat, alongside sophisticated radar and missile systems (notably the AIM‑54 Phoenix). Towards this end, he held several leadership positions, including Deputy Commander of the Air Training Command, and subsequently Deputy Commander for Planning and Organization of the IIAF., a position he held until shortly before the end of the IIAF in the 1979 Islamic Revolution in Iran. General Jahanbani was also an avid athlete and emphasized physical fitness throughout all areas under his command. For this reason, towards the end of his career he was also appointed general secretary of the National Sports Federation.

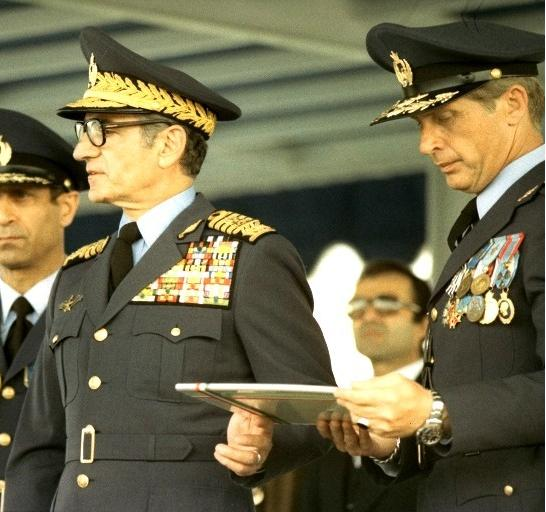
Next to Mohammad Reza Shah Pahlavi and IIAF commander General Khatami

== Personal life and family ==
Jahanbani had two children from two wives, a son, Anushiravan, and a daughter, Golnar. His son was from his first wife, Azar Etessam, and his daughter from his second wife, Farah Zangeneh. Zangeneh was the daughter of Colonel Yadolah Azam Zangeneh. Both children live in the United States. Through his son Jahanbani had a great grandson whose middle name is Nader.

From his mother, he had two brothers and one sister: Parviz, who was a paratrooper and commander in the Imperial Iranian Marines (Takavar), Khosrow, who married Shahnaz Pahlavi, the Shah of Iran's eldest child, and Mehr Monir who brought all the Baluchi hand woven art on all ceremonial clothing of the Empress and some on the Shah. From his father's first wife, he had five half brothers: Massoud, an ambassador, Hossein, a lieutenant general in the Imperial Iranian Army (IIA), Majid in the labor and later in the agriculture ministries, Hamid a brigadier general in the IIA, and Mahmoud. He also had two half sisters: one who died very young, and lastly Kian Taj. Christiane Amanpour is a distant relative.

== Arrest and execution ==
In the run up to and after the February 1979 uprising in Iran, Jahanbani was determined to stay in his country which he had served his entire life. However, Khomeini subsequently ordered the arrest of him and others, at the IIAF headquarters at Doshan Tappeh. He was one of the first of the Shah's generals to be arrested and was sent to a revolutionary court run by the infamous Sadegh Khalkhali. During his detention he had an encounter with Ahmad Khomeini who thought Jahanbani was a foreigner. In response Jahanbani stated that all his ancestors were more Iranian than everyone in the current regime.

When Jahanbani was brought to a sham trial, they soon found that he had committed no crime, and no one could be found to testify to that effect. They had put a piece of paper around his neck to write down his crime; but instead wrote on the blank paper: "Lieutenant General Nader Jahanbani, cause of corruption."

He was charged and convicted with:

Association with the Shah's idolatrous regime; Corruption on earth; Unspecified anti-revolutionary offense; War on God, God's Prophet, and the deputy of the Twelfth Imam

Anushirvan Jahanbani answers why his father, like many other military officials and politicians, did not leave Iran after the revolution:

"Incidentally, at that time I was very insistent on my father leaving Iran, because we had access to planes. We could have left Iran both through Iran Air and with IIAF transport aircraft. My father, however, always said that I am a soldier of this country and it is my duty to stay here. He said that it is impossible for me to leave my country. Even when the Shah left, we said, "Now that your king has left, why don't you leave too? He said, no, it is my duty to stay in this country." He rejected this offer, saying that I have not done anything that would make me afraid and want to run away, and he was not convinced to leave Iran in any way. I think that if he had left Iran, he would have suffered every day. My father's place was his own country."

Jahanbani was taken to Qasr Prison, and in the early hours of 13 March 1979 he was shot in the courtyard. He is buried in Behesht-e Zahra cemetery, Tehran. Since his execution, people started calling him "the blue eyed general".

Empress Farah Pahlavi wrote:

"A bit later, I managed to contact by phone a dear friend whose husband, Air Force Lieutenant General Nader Jahanbani, had just been executed. Insulted by one of the guardians of the revolution, he had the courage to slap him in the face before dying. She was sobbing and I, who should have been able to find words to comfort her, could do nothing but cry with her. That evening, in despair, I wrote these few lines in my notebook: "I don't feel I have the strength in me to go on fighting. I would prefer to die for my country with honor rather than be dragged toward death by the depression that is overtaking me. Dear God, if you are there, give me the strength to go on."

He was survived by his mother, his two children, and his brothers and sisters.

== Honours and awards ==
- Order of Aryamehr
- Order of Merit
- 1953 Coup d'état Medal
- 2,500-year celebration Medal
- Cornoration Medal
- Medal of Homayoun
- Paas Medal
- Medal of Honor
- Military service award
- Persepolis Medal
- Marksmanship Medal
- Rastakhiz Medal

== See also ==
- Air force history of Iran
- Golden Crown
- Joint Operation Arvand
- 1974–1975 Shatt al-Arab conflict
