= Air force history of Iran =

The History of the Iranian Air Force, currently known as the Islamic Republic of Iran Air Force, can be divided into two phases—before the Islamic Revolution, and after it.

== Imperial era ==
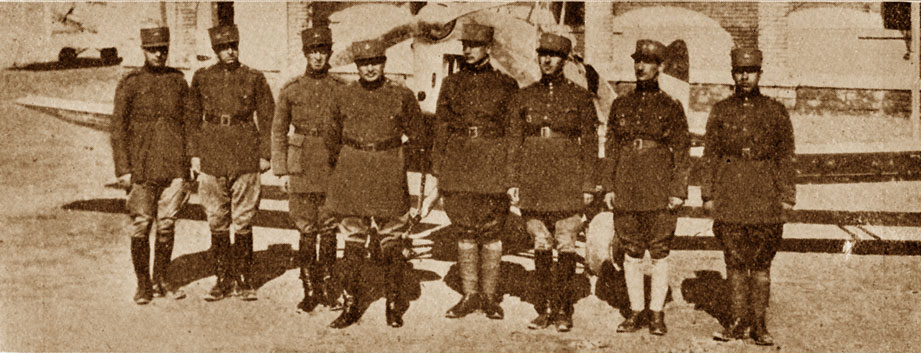
Eight major officers of the Imperial Iranian Air force, in 1933.

Imperial Iranian Air Force
- The logo of the Iranian Air Force
- Founded: February 25, 1925
- Disbanded: 11 February 1979
- Country: Pahlavi Iran
- Allegiance: Shah of Iran
- Type: Air force
- Role: Aerial warfare
- Size: 100,000 (1979)
- Motto: The High Sky Is My Place
- Aircraft: 450 modern combat aircraft (1978)
- Engagements: World War II; Anglo-Soviet invasion; Azerbaijan crisis; Battle of Nalos; Project Dark Gene; Joint Operation Arvand; Dhofar rebellion; Second Iraqi–Kurdish War; 1974–1975 Shatt al-Arab conflict; 1978 Iranian Chinook shootdown

Commanders
- Commander-in-Chief: Mohammad Reza Pahlavi
- Commander: Lt Gen Amir Hossein Rabii (last)
- Deputy Commander: Lt Gen Shapour Azarbarzin (last)
- Coordinating Deputy Commander: Brig Gen Fereydoun Mahdavi (last)

Insignia
- Roundel

- Fin flash

Aircraft flown
- Fighter: F-4 Phantom II F-5 Tiger II
- Helicopter: CH-47 Chinook 206 Jet Ranger 212 214 Isfahan
- Interceptor: F-14 Tomcat
- Patrol: P-3 Orion
- Reconnaissance: RF-4 Phantom II RF-5
- Transport: C-130 Hercules 707 747
- Tanker: KC-707 KC-747

The Imperial Iranian Air Force (IIAF) was a branch of the Imperial Iranian Armed Forces and was established by Reza Shah, the Shah of Iran, in the early 1920s. It officially became operational with its first fully trained pilots on February 25, 1925. Iran's first attempt to procure aircraft from the United States in the 1920s failed due to Washington's refusal to supply equipment because of a World War I treaty. Until World War II, the IIAF's aircraft inventory consisted entirely of Western European aircraft, mainly British and German. However, following a coordinated British and Soviet invasion of Iran during World War II in response to Reza Shah's declaration of neutrality, the IIAF's bases were occupied by the Allies and all existing IIAF aircraft were either destroyed or dismantled by the Soviet and British military. A few Iranian planes did manage to get airborne during the invasion and engaged the Royal Air Force (RAF) in dogfights, in which the RAF emerged victorious.

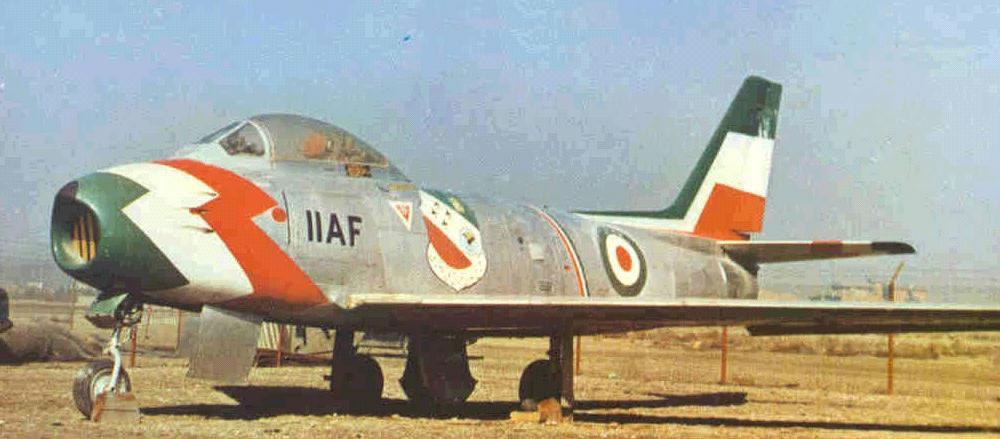
An F-86 Sabre from the Golden Crown aerobatic display team, of the Imperial Iranian Air Force.

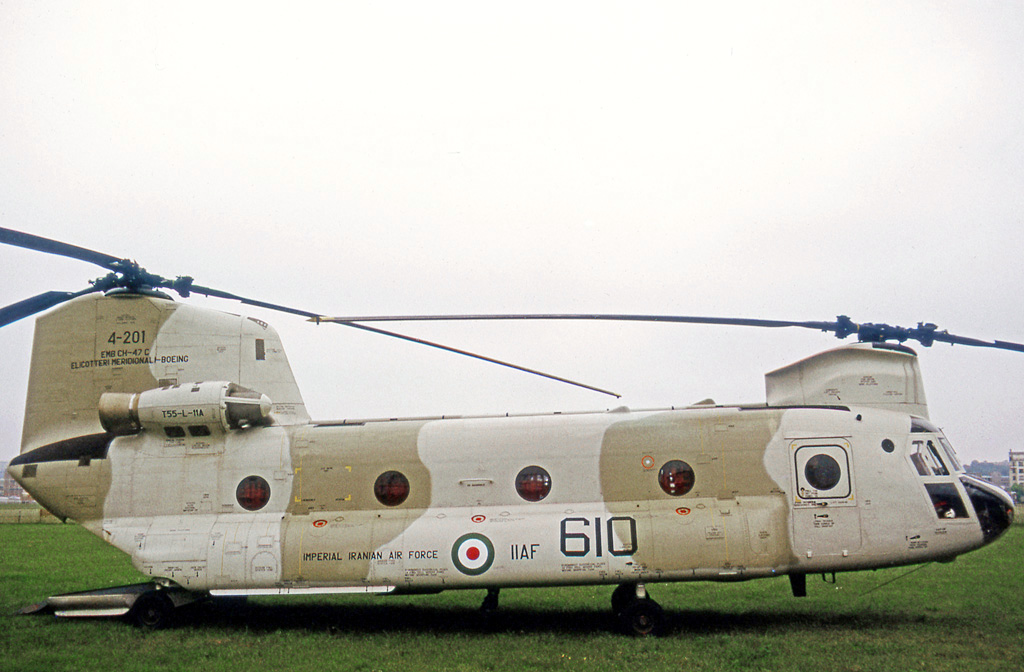
CH-47C Chinook of the Imperial Iranian Air Force at Issy heliport, Paris, in 1971.

A roughly 1946 order of battle for the Air Force can be found in Jane's Fighting Aircraft of World War II. Two regiments were both reported to be based near Tehran. After World War II, the IIAF began to slowly rebuild its inventory, with aircraft mainly supplied by the United States and Great Britain. A national, aerobatic display team was formed in 1958. Called "Golden Crown", and a part of the IIAF, this lasted until 1979. Lieutenant general Nader Jahanbani is credited with establishing the Golden Crown and is generally considered the "Father of IIAF".

In the 1960s, the IIAF acquired 90 Canadair Sabre fighters from the RCAF, but they were flipped over to the Pakistan Air Force.

In the 1960s and 1970s, the air force was used as part of a joint, aerial espionage programme of Iran and the United States, against the Soviet Union. This was in two parts, known as Project Dark Gene and Project Ibex.

The IIAF deployed aircraft to Oman in the 1970s, when Iran provided military assistance to that country, during the Dhofar rebellion. During this conflict, one Iranian F-4 Phantom II was shot down by rebels.

In 1976, the Imperial Iranian Air Force responded to a UFO incident over the Iranian capital, Tehran.

Later in the 1970s, the IIAF became the only military force other than the United States Navy to be equipped with the F-14 Tomcat. Consequently, it also became the only other operator of the AIM-54 Phoenix air-to-air missile.

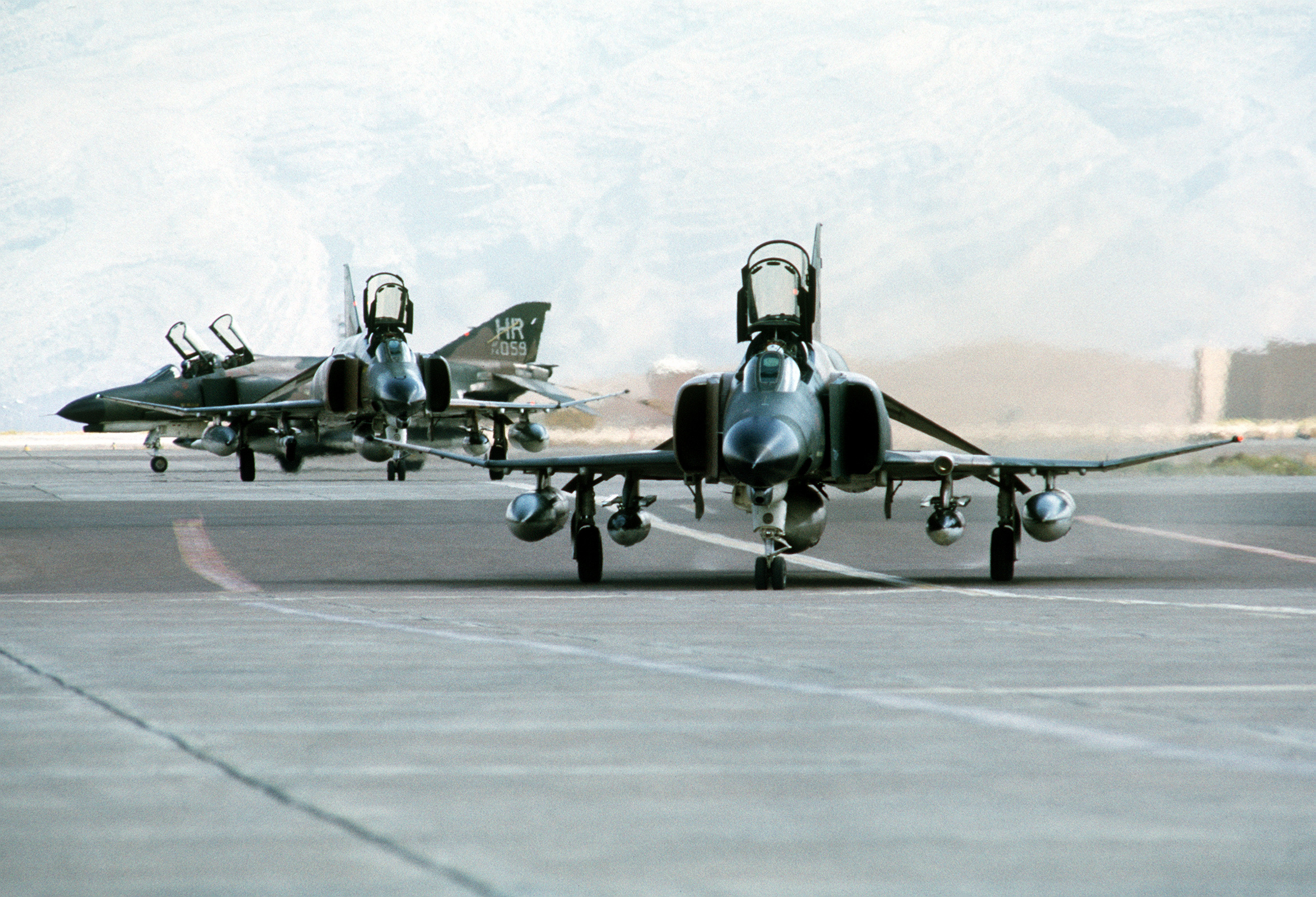
Three U.S. Air Force McDonnell Douglas F-4E Phantom II aircraft parked at Shiraz Air Base, Iran, during exercise Cento, 1 August 1977

During this era, the United States instituted the "Spellout", "Peace Ruby" and "Peace Net" programmes to upgrade the air-defence system of Iran. As well as air defence radars, the network was linked using microwave and troposcatter communications networks.

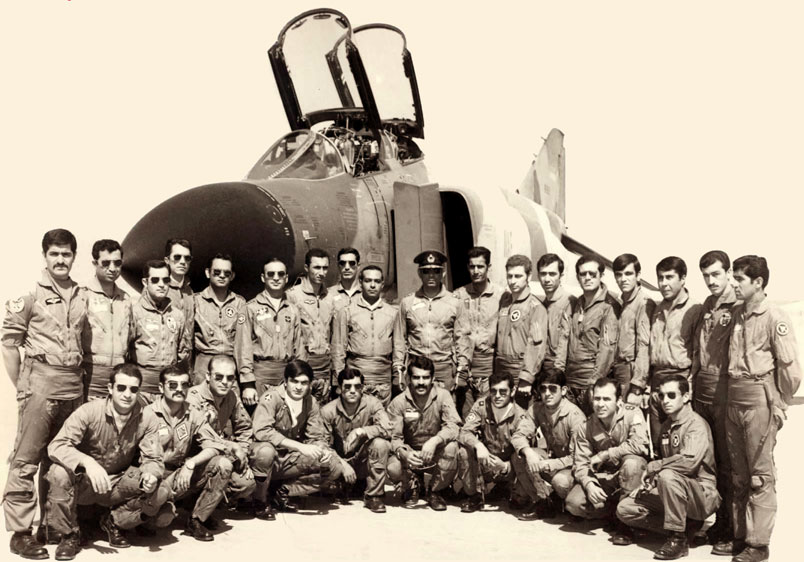
The first F-4D Phantom II squadron of Iran, 1971.

After the 1979 Iranian revolution, some of the IIAF's F-14s were not in working order due to a lack of necessary spare parts, because of an American arms embargo and damage sustained by the aircraft during the 1980 Iraqi invasion. Some were brought back into service, through localized production of reverse-engineered, Iranian-made, spare parts, as well as "cannibalism", the process of taking working parts from damaged aircraft and using them to repair others. The IIAF had also placed an order for over 150 F-16 Fighting Falcon fighter aircraft in 1976, but deliveries were never made due to the revolution. These aircraft would go on to serve in the Israeli Air Force. The IIAF had placed another order for 250 F-18L Hornet fighters in 1976, but the revolution caused all potential deliveries of the F-18L to be canceled.

== Post-Islamic Revolution ==
The overthrow of the Shah in the Islamic Revolution of February 1979, was followed by changes to the organization of the Iranian military. The air force was renamed the Islamic Republic of Iran Air Force (IRIAF), and largely inherited the equipment and structure of the former IIAF. Due to strained relations with the west, Iran had to procure new equipment from Brazil, the Soviet Union/Russia and the People's Republic of China.

However, it lost most of its leading officers in the course of post-revolutionary chaos, as well as due to the prosecution of those considered as loyal to the Shah, pro-U.S. or elsewhere by the new government in Tehran. Its other personnel were also decimated by the purges, with many pilots removed or leaving the air force. This left the air force ill-prepared for the Iran–Iraq War.

=== Iran–Iraq War ===
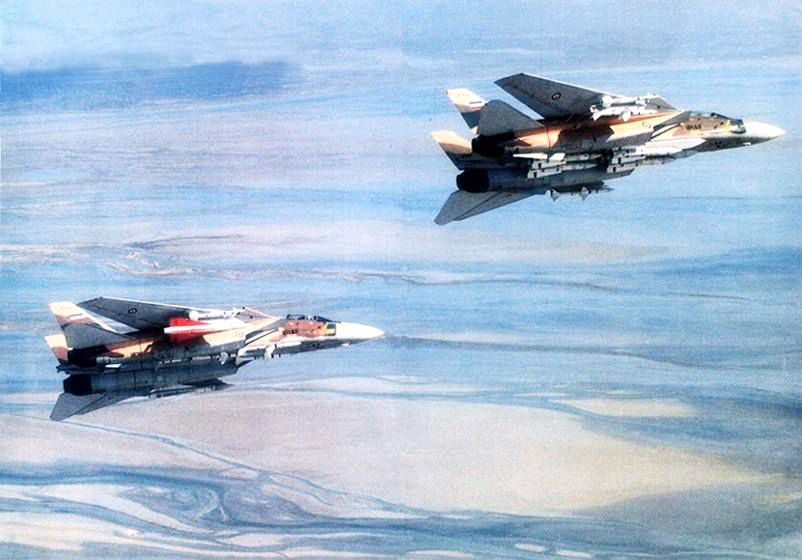
Two F-14 Tomcats equipped with multiple missiles, circa 1986

A series of purges and forced retirements, as a consequence of the 1979 Iranian Revolution, resulted in the manpower of the service being halved between February 1979 and July 1980, leaving the IRIAF ill-prepared for the Iran–Iraq War (also called the "1st Persian Gulf War"). The sudden Iraqi air strikes against six Iranian airfields and four other military installations, launched on the afternoon of 22 September 1980, came as a complete surprise and caused a shock in the renamed "IRIAF", which was in the midst of reorganizing following the Iranian revolution which had ended one year earlier. Nevertheless, the Islamic Republic of Iran Air Force retaliated, flying strikes involving up to 146 fighter-bombers against Iraqi airfields, oil industry installations, and communications sites. In addition to striking Iraqi airfields, the IRIAF succeeded in damaging Iraqi oil-producing and exporting facilities; resulting in Baghdad's decision to stop all oil exports for several years.

Following a one-week-long counter-air campaign, and due to a critical situation on the ground in Khuzestan Province, the IRIAF was thrown into the land-battle, mainly in the areas of Khorramshahr, Ahvaz, and Dezful. Here, the IRIAF's performance surprised most informed observers, with air strikes against armour and supply columns. Due to heavy losses in troops and armour, Iranian air superiority and an interruption of supply systems, the Iraqis had to stop their offensive, and then became involved in extremely bitter land-battles against Iranian ground forces.

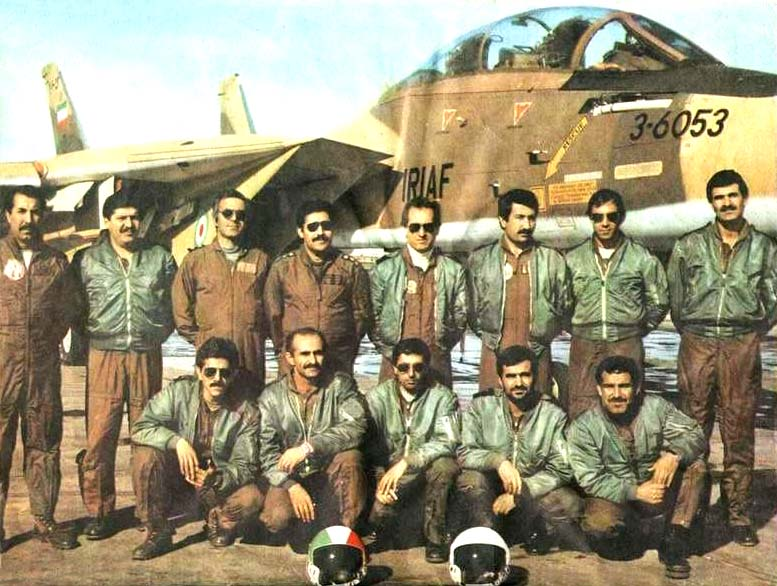
The first squadron of Islamic Republic of Iran Air Force F-14 Tomcat pilots, at Shiraz Air Base.

However, the IRIAF paid a heavy price for this success, losing dozens of its best pilots and aircraft in the period between September and December 1980. Although the readiness rates of the IRIAF significantly increased in the following months, its overall role and influence declined, as the clerical government searched to put the emphasis in fighting on the Islamic Revolutionary Guard Corps (IRGC) militias, but also attempted to develop a separate air arm for this service.

After the successful liberation of most Iranian areas captured by the Iraqis, in late spring 1982, the situation of the IRIAF changed completely. From an air arm that was offensive by nature, it was largely relegated to air defense and, relatively seldom, tasks of flying bombing attacks against targets of industrial and military significance inside Iraq. Simultaneously, the IRIAF had to learn to maintain and keep operational its large fleet of U.S.-built aircraft and helicopters without outside help, due to American sanctions. Reaching back on equipment purchased from the U.S.A. in the 1970s, the Iranians began establishing their own aerospace industry; their efforts in this remained largely unrecognized until recently.

However, the IRIAF was able to obtain limited amounts of spare parts and weapons for its American-made aircraft, when Iran was able to buy American spare parts and weapons for its armed forces, during the Iran–Contra affair. Deliveries came via Israel and later, from the USA.

From 1984 and 1985, the IRIAF found itself confronted by an ever-better organized and equipped opponent, as the Iraqi Air force—reinforced by deliveries of advanced fighter-bombers from France and the Soviet Union—launched numerous offensives against Iranian population centres, industrial infrastructures, powerplants, and oil-export hubs. These became better known as "The Tanker War" and "The War of the Cities". To defend against an increasing number of Iraqi air strikes, the IRIAF leaned heavily on its large fleet of F-14 Tomcat air superiority fighters. Tomcats were mainly deployed in defense of the strategically important Kharg Island (main hub for Iranian oil exports), and Tehran. Over 300 air-to-air engagements against IQAF fighters, fighter-bombers, and bombers, were fought in these areas alone between 1980 and 1988.

Confronted with the fact that it could not obtain replacements for equipment lost in what became a war of attrition against Iraq, for the rest of the conflict, the IRIAF remained defence-orientated, conserving its surviving assets as a "force in being". From mid-1987, the IRIAF found itself confronted also with U.S. Navy fighters over the Persian Gulf. A number of confrontations that occurred between July 1987 and August 1988, stretched available IRIAF assets to the limit, exhausting its capability to defend Iranian airspace against Iraqi air strikes.

=== Post Iran–Iraq War ===
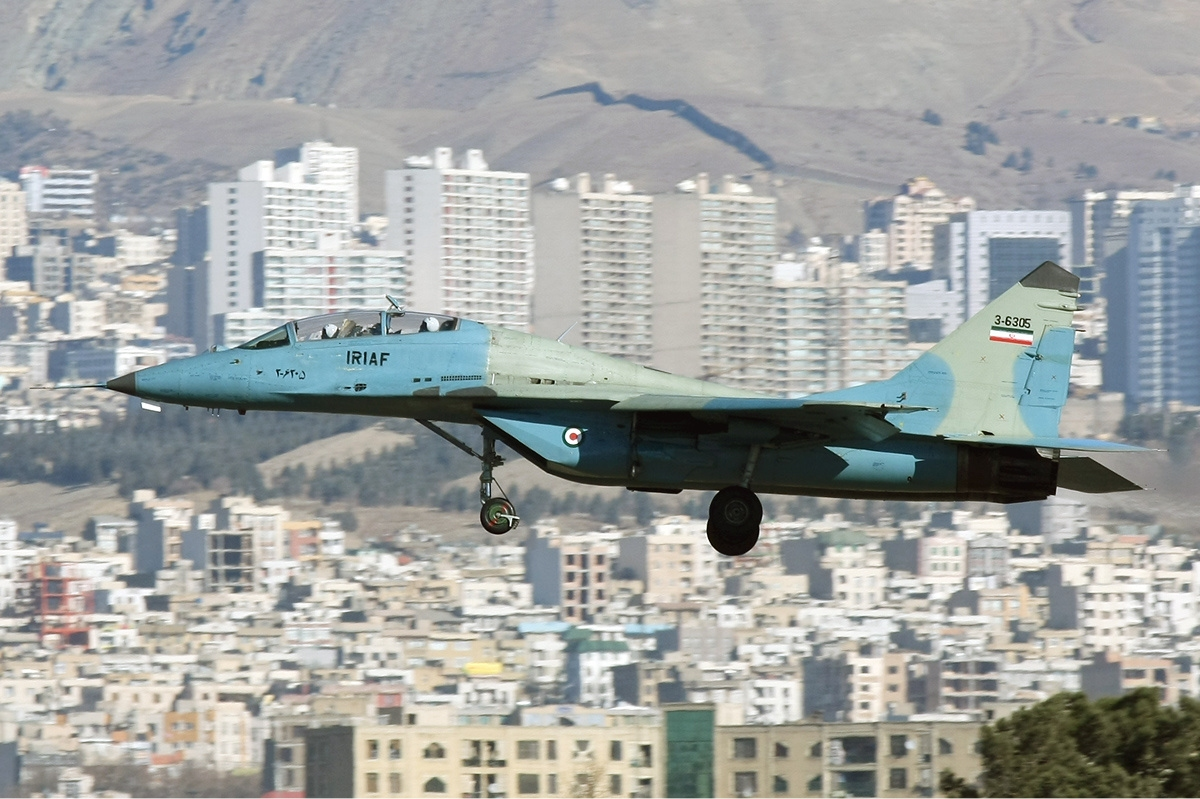
Iranian Air Force MiG-29UB

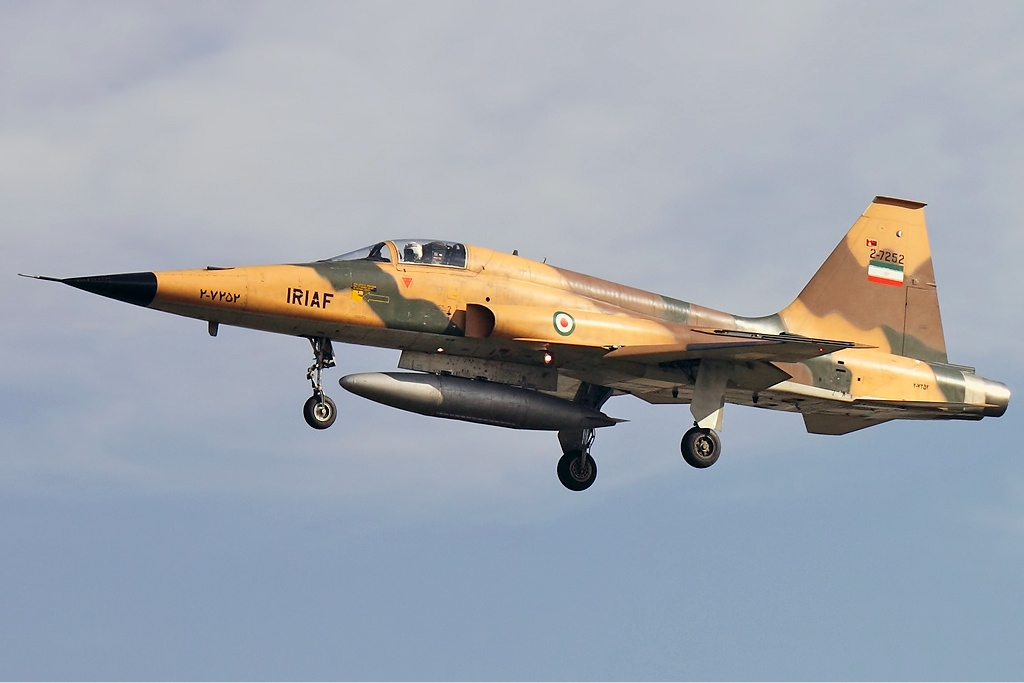
IRIAF Northrop F-5A Freedom Fighter

Immediately after the end of the Iran–Iraq War, the IRIAF was partially re-built by limited purchases of MiG-29 fighters and Su-24 bombers from the Soviet Union, as well as F-7M and FT-7 fighters from China. While a welcome reinforcement, these types never replaced the older, U.S.-built F-4 Phantoms or F-14 Tomcats (now the only air arm in the world to continue using the fighter), or even Northrop F-5 Tiger IIs. Instead, the IRIAF continued efforts to maintain these types in service, and began a number of projects with the intention to refurbish and upgrade them.

A Russian attempt to sell a large number of MiG-27s, MiG-31s, and Tupolev Tu-22Ms to Iran, launched in 1993, was spoiled by a lack of interest and money on the part of Iran.

=== Iraqi aircraft from the Persian Gulf War ===
Following an alleged agreement (no actual proof exists for it) between the regimes in Baghdad and Tehran, in February 1991 a significant number of Iraqi Air Force (IrAF) aircraft were evacuated to Iranian airfields, to avoid destruction in the 1991 Persian Gulf War. The agreement was for Iran to return them after the war, but the Iranians impounded these aircraft instead, claiming them as war reparations for the Iran–Iraq War.

The IRIAF has pressed into service all of the 36 Su-24MKs, 7 SU-25s and 24 Mirage F.1BQs and F.1EQs flown from Iraq, while all the other types—including 40 Su-20/22s and at least ten MiG-23s of various versions—were stored.

=== Present ===
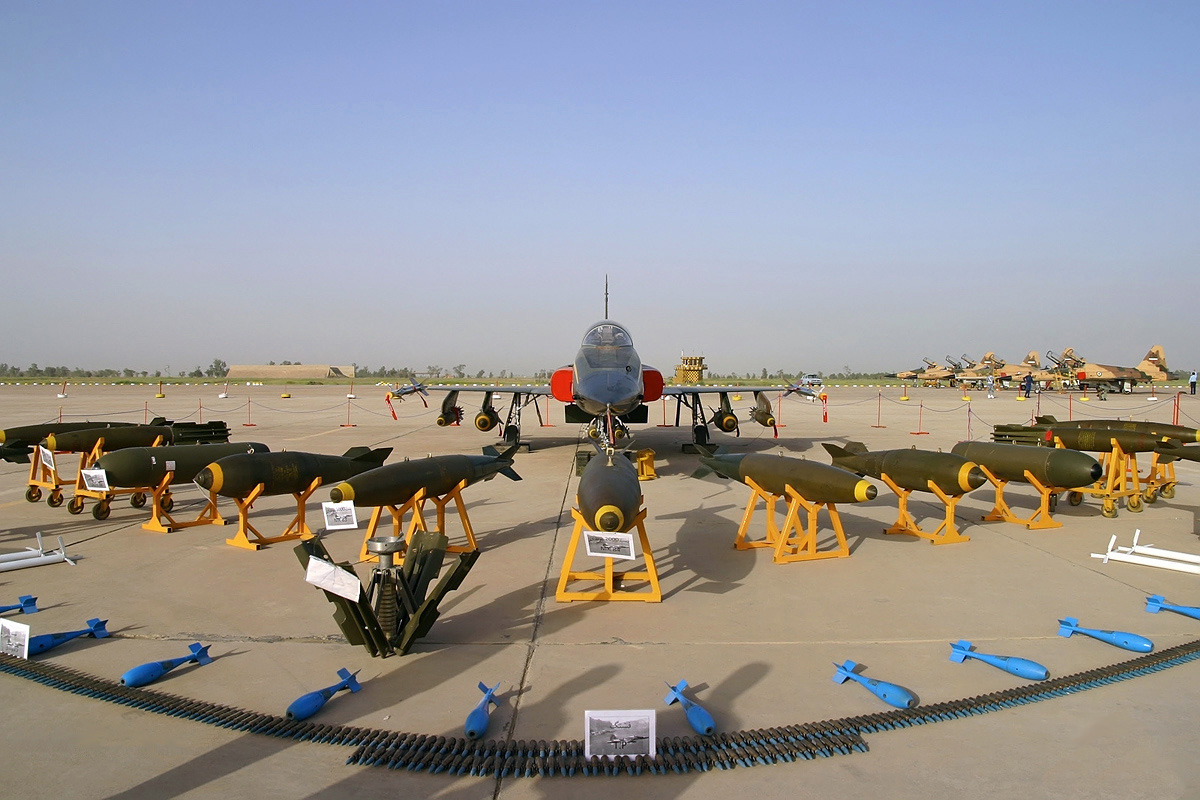
HESA Azarakhsh.

The exact current composition of the IRIAF is hard to determine, but estimates do exist. Due to the continuous spare parts shortages faced by the air force, a decision was made in the late 1980s to develop a local aerospace industry to support the air force.

In 2002, Iran with the co-operation of Ukraine, successfully started the manufacture of the Iran-140; a licence-built version of the Antonov An-140 transport aircraft. Simultaneously, Iran began construction of two 100% domestically produced fighters, upgraded using technology from the F-14 Tomcat and the F-5 Tiger II. The fighters have been named the Azarakhsh and the Shafaq.

Since then the country has also become self-sufficient in the manufacture of helicopters. The country claims that it is capable of producing the old U.S. AH-1 Cobra gunship. Additionally, Iran also produces Bell Helicopter Bell 212 and Bell 206 helicopters in serial production. These are known respectively as the Shabaviz 2-75 and the Shabaviz 206.

=== Iran–Israel War ===
Due to its obsolete equipment, the IRIAF proved to be totally incompetent during the 2025 Twelve-Day War, with no sign of its ageing fighter jets even getting off the ground, giving the Israeli Air Force control over the skies of Iran, which led to the elimination of various targets across the country.

== Notable pilots ==
Iran was engaged in a war with Iraq. The 8 year long conflict with Iraq gave the IRIAF the opportunity to develop fighter pilots. Using Current Knowledge we can find two Iranian fighter aces.

Jalil Zandi is Iran's most successful fighter pilot. Flying the F-14 Tomcat he claimed 11 aerial victories, with 8 of those being confirmed by western sources. These include 4 MiG-23s, 2 Su-22s, 2 MiG 21 and 3 Mirage F1s. These totals make him the most successful Iranian fighter pilot, the most successful F-14 Tomcat pilot, and the most recent (and last man) to claim ace status.

Yadollah Javadpour flew the F-5 and claimed five Iraqi aircraft shot down; two being reliably confirmed. This makes him an ace and the most successful F-5 fighter pilot, but his greatest claim to fame happened on August 6, 1983 when he shot down an Iraqi MiG-25. This was a significant achievement for an F-5 pilot, as the MiG-25 is a much bigger and faster aircraft with a substantial altitude advantage. His other confirmed kill was an Su-20 on October 17, 1980.

== Inventory 1920–1979 ==
Inventory of the Imperial Iranian Air Force (IIAF)
Aircraft	Number	Origin	Image
Avro Anson Mk.I		United Kingdom	
Beechcraft F-33A Bonanza	10	United States	
Beechcraft F-33C Bonanza	39	United States	
Bell 206 JetRanger		United States	
Bell 212		United States	
Bell AH-1J International	202	United States	
Boeing 707-368C		United States	
Boeing 707-3J9C		United States	
Boeing 747-100		United States	
Boeing 747-100F		United States	
Boeing 747-200F		United States	
Boeing-Vertol CH-47C Chinook	100	United States	
Breguet 14		French Third Republic	
Breguet 19 A2	2	French Third Republic	
Canadair CL-13B Sabre		Canada	
Cessna O-2A Skymaster	12	United States	
Curtiss H75A-9		United States	
Dassault Falcon 50		France	
de Havilland Canada DHC-2 Beaver		Canada	
de Havilland Canada DHC-4 Caribou	1	Canada	
de Havilland Tiger Moth	109	Canada	
Fokker F27-400M	2	Netherlands	
Fokker F27-600	25	Netherlands	
General Dynamics F-16A/B Fighting Falcon	A total of 300 aircraft were ordered (240 F-16As and 60 F-16Bs). 160 were ordered, and 140 were ready for shipment, but were not delivered due to the breakdown of relations between Iran and the United States.	United States	
Grumman F-14A Tomcat	79	United States	
Hawker Fury Mk.I		United Kingdom	
Hawker Fury Mk.II		United Kingdom	
Hawker Hart		United Kingdom	
Hawker Hind	55	United Kingdom	
Hawker Audax	66	United Kingdom	
Hawker Hurricane Mk.I		United Kingdom	
Hawker Hurricane Mk.II		United Kingdom	
Hawker Hurricane Mk T.IIC	2	United Kingdom	
Kaman HH-43 Huskie	12	United States	
Lockheed C-130E Hercules	28	United States	
Lockheed C-130H Hercules	32	United States	
Lockheed RC-130 Hercules		United States	
Lockheed P-3F Orion	6	United States	
Lockheed JetStar 8	3	United States	
Lockheed T-33 Shooting Star		United States	
McDonnell Douglas F-4D Phantom II	32	United States	
McDonnell Douglas F-4E Phantom II	177	United States	
McDonnell Douglas RF-4E Phantom II	16	United States	
Northrop F-5A Freedom Fighter	104	United States	
Northrop F-5B Freedom Fighter	23	United States	
Northrop F-5E Tiger II		United States	
F/A-18A/B Hornet	Up to 250 aircraft (240 F/A-18As and 10 F/A-18Bs) were on the purchase list, but the deal remained unfinished due to the breakdown of relations between Iran and the United States.	United States	
Northrop F-5F Tiger II		United States	
North American F-86F Sabre		United States	
De Havilland DH.4		United Kingdom of Great Britain and Ireland	
Airco DH.9A		United Kingdom of Great Britain and Ireland	
Polikarpov R-11		United Kingdom of Great Britain and Ireland	
Pilatus PC-7 Turbo Trainer		Switzerland	
Polikarpov R-5		Soviet Union	
Republic P-47D Thunderbolt	60	United States	
Republic F-84F Thunderstreak		United States	
Republic RF-84F Thunderstreak		United States	
Republic F-84G Thunderjet		United States	
Rockwell 681		United States	
Rockwell 690A		United States	

== Gallery ==
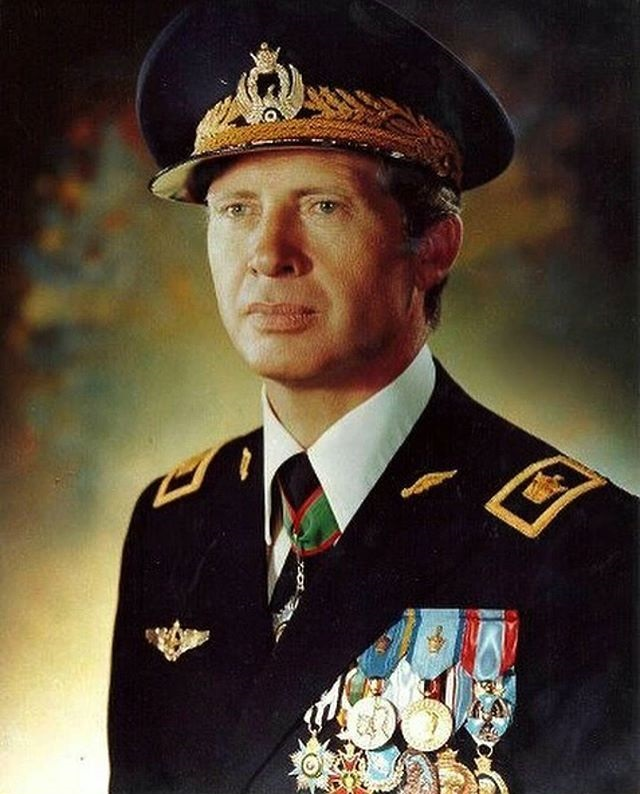
IIAF general Nader Jahanbani is considered one of the best pilots of his era.

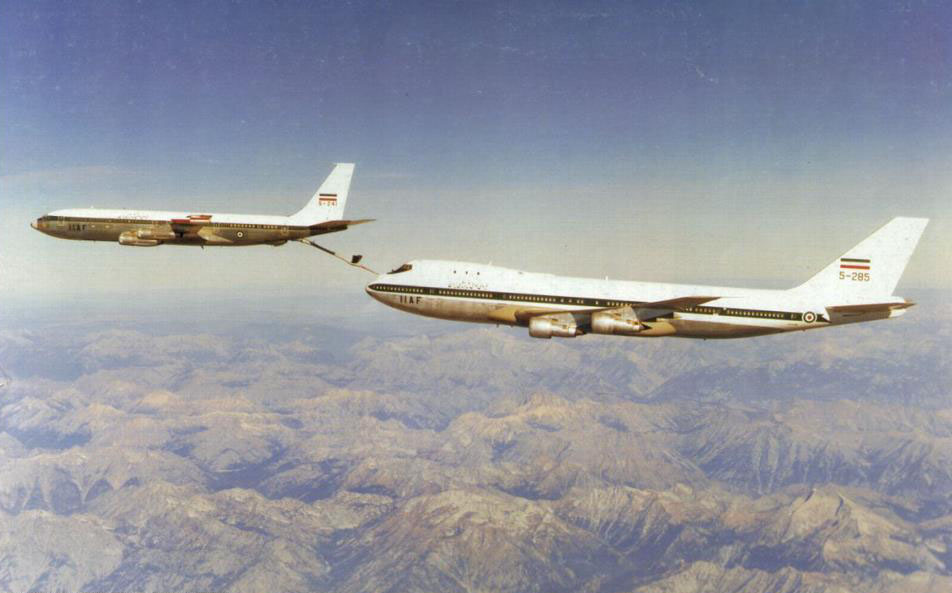
A Boeing 707 of the Imperial Iranian Air Force refuels a Boeing 747 of the IIAF.

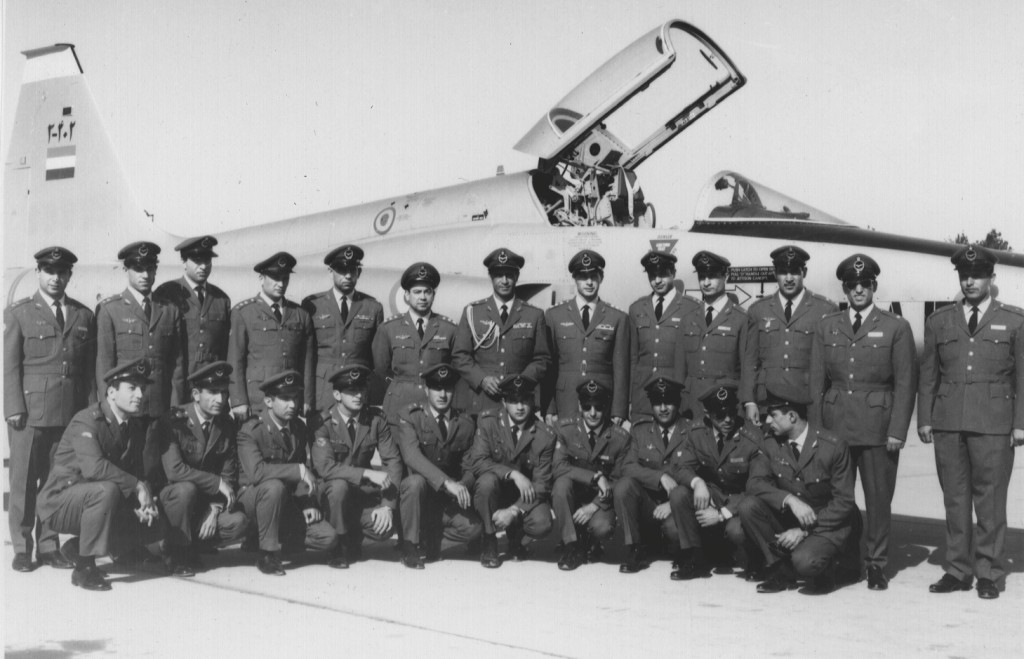
IIAF officers in front of an F-5E.

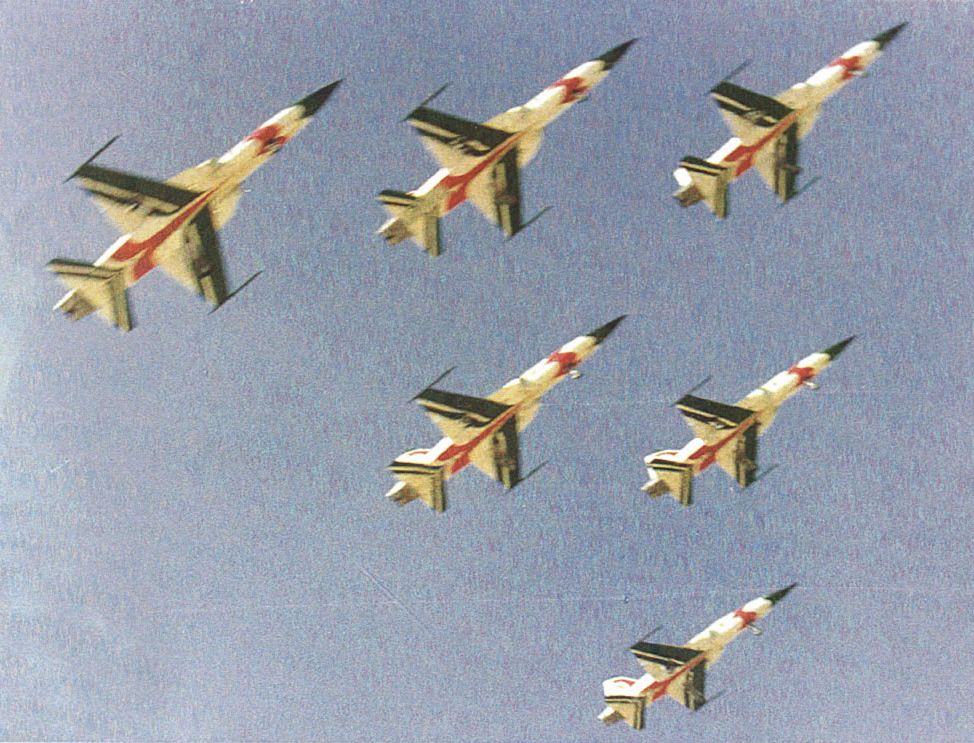
6 Imperial Iranian Air Force F-5Es of the Golden Crown aerobatic display team in an aerobatic exhibit.

== Bibliography ==
- Andersson, Lennart (July 1998). "Histoire de l'aéronautique persane, 1921–1941: La première aviation du Chah d'Iran" [History of the Persian Air Force, 1921–1941: The First Aircraft of the Shah of Iran]. Avions: Toute l'aéronautique et son histoire (in French) (76): 2–12. ISSN 1243-8650.
