= Teymur bey Makinsky =

Azerbaijani Minister of Justice 1918 - 1919

Teymur bey Makinsky Teymur bəy Makinski

Minister of Justice of Azerbaijan Democratic Republic (ADR)
- In office 26 December 1918 – 14 March 1919
- Preceded by: Fatali Khan Khoyski
- Succeeded by: Aslan bey Safikurdski

Deputy Minister of Justice of Azerbaijan Democratic Republic (ADR)
- In office 17 June 1918 – 6 October 1918
- Minister: Fatali Khan Khoyski

Representative to Armenia
- In office 20 October 1918 – 6 November 1918
- Preceded by: Abdurrahim bey Hagverdiyev
- Succeeded by: Vacant
- In office 20 March 1920 – 28 May 1920
- Preceded by: Vacant
- Succeeded by: Office abolished

Personal details
- Born: 18 April [O.S. 6 April] 1874 Malaklu, Surmalu uezd, Erivan Governorate, Russian Empire
- Education: University of Warsaw

Teymur bey Makinsky (Russian: Теймур бек Макинский) was an Azerbaijani nobleman who served as Minister of Justice of the Azerbaijan Democratic Republic between 1918 and 1919.

== Background and early life ==
He was born on 18 April 1874 in Malaklu, Surmalu uezd of the Erivan Governorate (modern Melekli, Iğdır) to Muhammadquli bey who was from Makinsky family —a family that originally hailed from Bayat tribe of Maku. His grandfather Mehdiquli bey (fl. 1806) was a militia praporschik serving in Erivan Governorate. While his great-grandfather was Hasan khan who ruled Maku Khanate between 1778–1822. He had two younger brothers—Zulfuqar bey Makinsky who served as a parliamentarian in the national assembly of the First Republic of Armenia, and Aga bey Makinski who also tried to run in the Armenian election, though unsuccessfully.

== Education and career under Russian Empire ==
He graduated from the Erivan Male Gymnasium with a silver medal on 23 July [O.S. 11 July] 1890, after which he entered the law faculty of the Imperial Moscow University. In 1896, he transferred to the Faculty of Law of the Imperial Warsaw University, from which he graduated with a diploma of the 1st degree and on 7 September [O.S. 26 August] 1897, appointed as a junior candidate for a judicial position at the Erivan District Court.

In 1899 he was promoted to the rank of collegiate secretary (a civil rank corresponding to the rank of lieutenant in the army). A year later he became titular adviser (corresponding to captain). In 1901, after serving different uyezds of Erivan Governorate for 4 years, he was assigned to the Ministry and sent serve as judicial investigator of the 1st section of the Blagodarnensky district of the Stavropol district court. In 1903, Makinsky was promoted to the rank of collegiate assessor. 3 years later he was reassigned as assistant prosecutor of the Yekaterinodar District Court and in 1909 became court councillor. He was again promoted to collegiate councillor in 1912. He became a member of the Yekaterinodar District Court in 1916 but was transferred to Tbilisi Court Chamber in 1917 as member.

== Career under Azerbaijan Democratic Republic ==
After moving to Tiflis, just in 6 months he became a member of the Muslim faction of the Transcaucasian Seim, and after its self-dissolution, he became a member of the National Council of Azerbaijan. According to the law of the National Council of November 19, 1918 "On the formation of the Azerbaijani Parliament", he was included in the Parliament of the Azerbaijan Democratic Republic without elections. On December 26, 1918 he was elected to the Parliamentary Commission for elections to the Constituent Assembly. From June to October 1918 worked as Deputy Minister of Justice in the Second Cabinet, and from October 20 to the end of December he was the diplomatic representative of Azerbaijan to Armenia. He was elected chairman of the board of the Muslim community of the Erivan province, which was established in January 1919 in Baku. From December 26, 1918 to March 14, 1919 he served as Minister of Justice in the Third Cabinet. On July 7, 1919, he was transferred to the post of chairman of the Azerbaijan Military Court. And in March 1920, he was again appointed to the post of diplomatic representative of the Azerbaijan Democratic Republic to the Armenian government.

After the fall of the Azerbaijan Democratic Republic on May 15, 1920, the activities of the diplomatic mission in Yerevan were terminated by the Armenian government. The Prosecutor's Office of Armenia opened a criminal case against Makinsky because he, being the head of the diplomatic mission, provided material assistance to Azerbaijani rebels in Zangibasar. However, with the assistance of the permanent representation of Georgia in Armenia, he was able to secretly leave Yerevan and arrived in Tiflis on May 28. There is no reliable information about the further fate of Teymur bey Makinsky.

== Awards ==
- Order of St. Anna 3rd class (12 January [O.S. 1 January] 1912)
- Bronze medal in memory of Romanov Tercentenary (6 March [O.S. 21 February] 1913)
- Order of St. Stanislav 2nd class. (3 December [O.S. 20 November] 1914)
