= Vsevolod Starosselsky =

Vsevolod Starosselsky (Vsevolod Dmitriyevich Staroselsky, Russian: Все́волод Дми́триевич Старосе́льский; 7 March 1875 – 29 June 1935) was a Russian military officer of Russian and Georgian noble background, known for his role in the aftermath of the Persian Constitutional Revolution as a commander of the Persian Cossack Brigade from 1918 to 1920.

== Career in Russia and Iran ==
Vsevolod Starosselsky was born into the family of Russian general Dmitry Staroselsky and Georgian princess Ekaterina Guramishvili (Guramova). He was raised in the liberal aristocratic milieu in Tiflis and trained at the Page Corps. He fought in the Savage Division during World War I and was given command of the Kabarda Cavalry Regiment and promoted to the rank of colonel in 1916. After the Russian Revolution of 1917, he entered the service of Qajar Iran. In 1918, he became commander of the Persian Cossack Brigade, the only organized military unit in Iran, as a result of an internal coup within the brigade against its commander, Colonel Georgy Klerzhe, a suspected Bolshevik sympathizer. In this role, Starosselsky was helped by the Iranian officer Reza Khan, the future shah of Iran, and tacitly supported by the United Kingdom. As historian Stephanie Cronin states, Staroselsky's primary objective in seizing command of and consolidating the Brigade after the chaos of 1917 was to preserve an instrument of Imperial Russian power in Iran while awaiting the victory of the Whites in the civil war. He exerted significant influence on the politics of Iran as he fought a military campaign against the Jangalis and their Bolshevik allies in Gilan, acceding to a dictatorial power in northern Iran. Around the same time, his relations with the British increasingly soured as Starosselsky sought to decrease British influence in Tehran.

== Downfall and emigration ==
By August 1920, Starosselsky's initially successful campaign against the Soviet-backed revolutionaries in Gilan suffered a setback. Having retaken Rasht, the Cossack Brigade had to retreat in the face of the Soviet reinforcements landing at Enzeli. In October 1920, Starosselsky's positions were further undermined by the arrival of Edmund Ironside, who took command of the British forces in Iran. Starosselsky was soon removed from his position by the shah Ahmad Shah Qajar through the efforts of the British agents, who accused him of appropriating part of the soldiers' pay, bribing the shah in order to advance his ambitions, and of being ready to betray the interests of Iran for Soviet Russia. Starosselsky emigrated to the United States, where he owned a ranch at Riverside, California, and died there of a stroke in 1935. He was buried at the Hollywood Forever Cemetery. Starosselsky owned a collection of Georgian and Oriental coins, which later passed into possession of the American Numismatic Society.
