= Haji Ismaeil Khan Bayat =

- Khan of Maku
- Reign: 1866 – 1899
- Predecessor: Ali Khan Bayat
- Successor: Teymur Pasha Khan
- Dynasty: Bayat dynasty
- Religion: Islam

Haji Ismaeil Khan Bayat was the fifth khan of the Maku Khanate from 1866 to 1899.

Preceded by Ali Khan Bayat	Khan of Maku; 1822—1866	Succeeded by Teymur Pasha Khan
