= Zulfugar bey Makinski =

Armenian politician (1885–1923)

Zulfugar bey Makinski Zülfüqar bəy Makinski

Member of Armenian Parliament
- In office June 1919 – 1920
- Succeeded by: office terminated

Representative of the Ministry of Protection (Azerbaijan)
- In office 1919–1920
- Preceded by: office established
- Succeeded by: Teymur bey Makinski
- Succeeded by: '

Personal details
- Born: 1885 Erivan
- Died: Unknown

Zulfugar bey Mahammadgulu bey oglu Makinski (b. 1885; Erivan, Erivan province, Russian Empire - d. after 1923) — representative of the Azerbaijan Democratic Republic in Armenia, a member of the Parliament of the Democratic Republic of Armenia, head of the financial department of the Ministry of Food of the Azerbaijan SSR, a member of the Makinsky family and the brother of Teymur bey Makinsky.

== Life ==
Zulfugar bey started studying at the Faculty of Law of Saint Petersburg State University in 1904 and graduated from it in 1911. After completing his university studies, he started working as a lawyer.

The origin of his family lies in the Maku Khanate of Iranian Azerbaijan. A branch of the Maku Khans from the Bayat tribe of the Oghuz Turks settled in Yerevan in the 19th century. Zulfugar was a representative of this family.

== Political activity ==
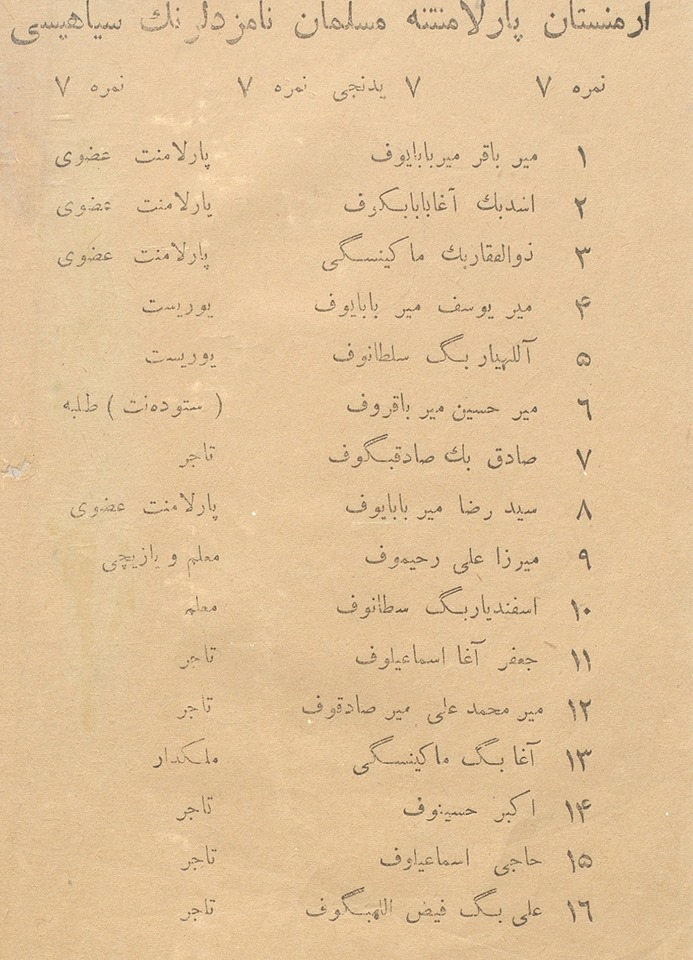
List of Muslim candidates for the Parliament of Armenia (1919)

In 1918, he was one of the 6 deputies (Asad Bey Aghabababeyov, Mirbagir Mirbabayev, Seyid Reza Mirbababeyov, Mirza Jabbar Mammadzadeh, Ashraf Agha Ismayilov, Zulfugar Bey Makinski) who were elected in the Parliament of the Democratic Republic of Armenia.

In 1918–1920, he took an active part in the activities of the Erivan Muslim National Council, the Erivan Muslim Charitable Society, and the Erivan Governorate Compatriots' Organizations, operating in Yerevan and belonging to Azerbaijani Turks. At the meeting of the organization under his leadership held on January 17, 1919, an appeal to the government of Azerbaijan was accepted. In the appeal sent with the signature of Teymur Khan Makinsky, the chairman of the organization, it was mentioned that after the withdrawal of the Turkish troops from the Iravan governorate, the Armenian armed forces captured the entire Surmeli district and the part of Etchmiadzin district inhabited entirely by Muslims, moreover, they attacked to capture the districts of Sharur and Nakhchivan. It was proposed to organize a special conference of representatives of Azerbaijan and Armenia in Tbilisi with the participation of the allied command to save the Muslims of Iravan province, who were condemned to destruction and death.

By the decision of the Azerbaijani government dated August 1, 1919, Zulfugar Bey Makinski was appointed to the position of the representative of the Minister of Protection in Armenia. After that, in the report he sent on November 11, 1919, it was mentioned:

As a result of the massacres that continued since February 1918, 0.5 million people became beggars... The Muslim population in those areas lost everything. The population of the destroyed regions is more than 200,000 people. They perished from disease and hunger, they were repeatedly looted and massacred. Muslims of Erivan city, Goykumbat, Arbat, Aghcagishlaq and Charbakh villages of Zangibasar belong to this category. It can be said with certainty that the number of dead is 100-120 thousand people. 50 thousand people came to Azerbaijan as refugees... Some of them moved to the Maku Khanate and the territory of Turkey. Currently, food aid (in the form of flour, grain and bread) should be provided to 50,000 people. The number of hungry people in Yerevan is 8,000 people.

After him, his brother Teymur bey Makinsky was appointed to this position. After the Soviet occupation, he was appointed as a head of the financial department of the Ministry of Food of the Azerbaijan SSR.

== Literature ==
- Азербайджанская Демократическая Республика: 1918–1920: законодательные акты. Baku: Azərbaycan Nəşriyyatı. 1998. ISBN 978-9952-37-473-5.
- Nazim, Mustafa (2018). Azərbaycan Xalq Cümhuriyyəti işığında: 1918-1920. Baku: Ulu.
- Çingizoğlu, Ənvər (2011). Makinskilər/ Makinskis (PDF). Baku: Soy.
- Xanməmmədova, Nərmin (2019). Transkafkasya'da (Güney Kafkasya) Devletlerarası İlişkiler ve Mülteci Sorunları (1918-1920). Istanbul.
