= Alexander Makinsky =

Former Coca-Cola Company executive (1900–1988)

Prince Alexander Makinsky
- Александр Макинский
- Born: Iskander Khan Makinsky; October 13, 1900; Maku, Qajar Iran
- Died: April 24, 1988 (aged 87); Paris, France
- Resting place: Sainte-Geneviève-des-Bois Russian Cemetery
- Other name: Alexander Gautier
- Spouse: Catherine Melikoff (m. 1925)
- Family: Bayat dynasty

Alexander Makinsky (Russian: Александр Макинский; October 13, 1900 – April 24, 1988) was an American businessman and noble born in Maku, Iran. He was a General Representative for Rockefeller Foundation in France, then assistant vice president of the Foundation in Paris and New York. He also served as vice-president for export of The Coca-Cola Company.

== Early life ==
He was born on 13 October 1900 to Makinsky family of Bayat extraction hailing from Maku. His father Pasha Khan Makinsky (1862–1934) was great-grandson of Hoseyn Khan Bayat. His mother Stefania Antonovna Lubielska (1878–1964) was an ethnic Polish and second wife of Pasha Khan. He was also known as Shura among his family. He was born at the time when his father Pasha was visiting his cousins in Maku. His family later moved to Baku where he was raised by a British nanny, from whom he learnt the language. He studied at Imperial School of Jurisprudence in Saint Petersburg, at the time most prestigious place for boys to study. However he had to leave Russia following October Revolution in 1917 together with his younger brother Karim (Cyril). Family first lived in Warsaw, then moved on to Paris.

In Paris, he quickly become involved with European and White émigré society, often attending their banquets. In one of such meetings, he met Catherine Melikoff, a noblewoman from Melikishvili family and daughter of David Melikishvili and granddaughter of Dmitry Staroselsky, Governor of Baku. Marriage took place on 14 November 1925. He also became acquainted with famous faces of European literature like Antoine de Saint-Exupery and James Joyce throughout his life in Paris.

== Professional life ==
He was involved in American Red Cross in Warsaw before becoming chief secretary of the Medical Sciences Division of Rockefeller Foundation in France in 1924. He quickly rose to be a representative of the foundation, he was recalled to Washington after Nazi Invasion of France in 1941 and became assistant to vice president of Rockefeller Foundation. He was noted as an influential person, securing escape of several scholars from Nazi regime, including Otto Fritz Meyerhof, Jean Wahl, Ernst Honigman and others thanks to his links to intelligence organizations. He further went on to secure permanent placements for the scholars he rescued, meeting Louis Wirth and Everett Hughes as well. He travelled post-war Europe, interviewing scholars to learn how Rockefeller Foundation can get involved in social sciences, making a comprehensive report on his work, forming American approach to European economy.

He was offered work by Robert W. Woodruff and hired by The Coca-Cola Company in 1946 as chief lobbyist in Europe. He particularly met resistance mostly from winemakers and Communists in France while trying to introduce Cola to market. French protests over its contents, including cocaine, phosphoric acid and caffeine became a national topic and a test for Cola's adventure in European market. However, this only made Makinsky much more ambitious, set himself the goal of selling forty bottles of Coke to every French person in 1952. His wife became anxious and afraid that their house might be bombed by communists, to which Makinsky answered "the best barometer of the relationship between the United States and any country" was "the way Coca-Cola is treated". Makinsky was also active in lobbying for Coca-Cola factory establishment in Egypt, Israel, Denmark, Portugal, Bulgaria and eventually USSR.

Having befriended President Eisenhower in 1954, Makinsky often reported to his assistant Charles Douglas Jackson and consulted government on post-Nazi Europe policy. Thanks to this links managed to get in the party accompanying Richard Nixon and Milton S. Eisenhower on their trip to open American National Exhibition in Moscow in 1959. After this, Makinsky made frequent visits to USSR, however he was accused by Pravda of being CIA spy in 1968 after his last visit. He was claimed to be a spy working for Poland and later Britain before World War II. Apart his lobbying and promoting work, he was also professor of social sciences at Sorbonne University. He was awarded Legion of Honour on 25 July 1957.

== Death ==
He died on 24 April 1988 and was buried in Sainte-Geneviève-des-Bois Russian Cemetery, Paris. He was survived by his wife Catherine who died two years later and his brother Cyril Makinsky (1910–1991) who died three years later.
