= Abdollah Amir-Tahmasebi =

Iranian senior military commander 1881–1928

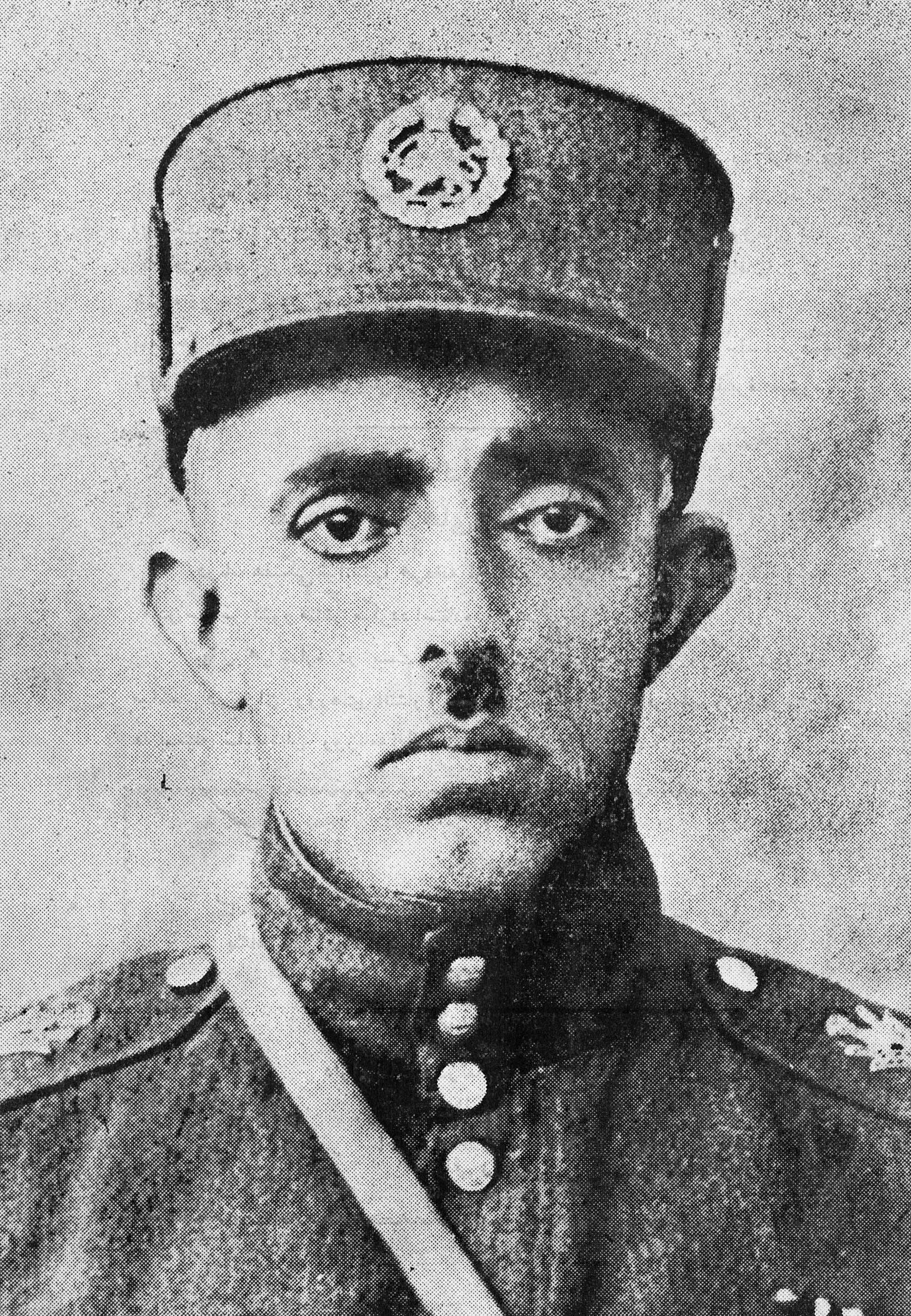
- Abdollah Amir-Tahmasebi in 1925
- Born: 1881; Tehran, Qajar Iran
- Died: 1928 (aged 47); Borujerd, Pahlavi Iran
- Military career
- Allegiance: Qajar Iran (?–1925); Pahlavi Iran (1925–1928)
- Branch: Imperial Iranian Army
- Rank: Major general

Abdollah Amir-Tahmasebi (Persian: عبدالله امیرطهماسبی; 1881–1928) was a high-ranking Iranian officer during the Qajar and Pahlavi periods.

Educated at the Cossack Staff School in Tehran, he rose rapidly through the ranks of the Iranian Cossack Brigade, becoming the lieutenant general (amir tuman) and head of the personal guard of Ahmad Shah Qajar (r. 1909–1925) in 1919. Following the 1921 military coup, Amir-Tahmasebi earned the trust of Reza Khan (the future Reza Shah Pahlavi), who promoted him to major general (amir lashkar) and appointed him governor-general and army commander of the Azerbaijan province. During this tenure, Amir-Tahmasebi restored central government authority, disarmed the autonomous Shahsevan tribes, ousted the powerful local ruler Mortezaqoli Eqbal al-Saltaneh Makui, and spearheaded extensive public works and modernization programs.

His growing popularity in Azerbaijan alarmed Reza Khan, leading to his recall to Tehran, where he was appointed military governor of the city and oversaw the transition of power away from the Qajar dynasty. Following the establishment of the Pahlavi dynasty in late 1925, Amir-Tahmasebi served briefly as Minister of War and from 1927 as Minister of Public Utilities and Commerce, launching several modernization projects. In early 1928, while inspecting road construction in the Lorestan province, he was fatally shot by bandits.

== Background and education ==
Amir-Tahmasebi was from an Iranian family in Tehran that had lived to the north of the Aras river prior to its conquest by the Russian Empire during the reign of Fath-Ali Shah Qajar (r. 1797–1834). Amir Tahmasebi's father was an officer of the Iranian Cossack Brigade. Amir-Tahmasebi attended the Cossack Staff School in Tehran after completing primary school. He completed six years of military instruction to graduate as an officer and subsequently started serving in the Cossack Division.

== Career ==
=== Under the Qajar dynasty ===
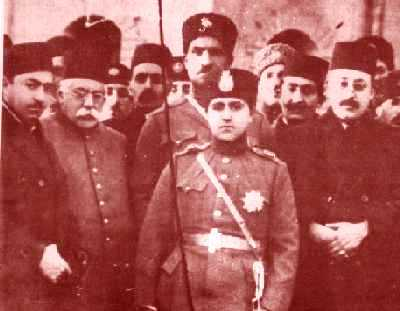
Reza Khan (later Reza Shah Pahlavi) behind Ahmad Shah Qajar in 1918

Amir-Tahmasebi saw swift promotions due to his talent and courage. In 1919, he was appointed as lieutenant general (amir tuman) and head of the personal guard of Ahmad Shah Qajar (r. 1909–1925).

In February 1921, a military coup was orchestrated by Colonel Reza Khan (the future Reza Shah Pahlavi) and Zia ol Din Tabatabaee against the cabinet of prime minister Fathollah Khan Akbar and the ruling oligarchy of landowners and officials. The ruling Qajar dynasty was not the target of the coup. Ahmad Shah been convinced by Amir-Tahmasebi to stay in Tehran. After the coup, many members of the oligarchy were arrested, while Ahmad Shah appointed Zia ol-Din Tabatabaee as the prime minister and Reza Khan as the commander of the army.

In 1922, the army was substantially reorganized by Reza Khan, who reduced numerous ranks that had been previously awarded. Amir-Tahmasebi was therefore reduced in rank to brigadier general (sartip) and was placed in charge of the cavalry brigade. However, Reza Khan quickly noticed Amir-Tahmasebi's professionalism and diligence, and thus promoted him to major general (amir lashkar), the highest military rank available during that period. Sent to the Azerbaijan province as governor-general and army commander, Amir-Tahmasebi put the most distant Iranian regions in the west and northwest under the rule of the new cabinet through skillful leadership and communication tactics.

He collaborated with the local communities to start numerous developmental programs and vastly improve towns and villages. His efforts resulted in the establishment of schools, hospitals, arterial roads, libraries, orphanages, and barracks. The tribal groups in Azerbaijan were disarmed by Amir-Tahmasebi, which brought order back to the region. He heavily focused on the zones of Ardabil, Ahar, and Meshginshahr, which had been for years oppressed by autonomous Shahsevan tribes without intervention.

Amir-Tahmasebi gained strong support in Azerbaijan due to his operations and likable character. This alarmed Reza Khan, who considered ordering his return to Tehran. Amir-Tahmasebi's final duty in Azerbaijan was to reduce the local power of Mortezaqoli Eqbal al-Saltaneh Makui, who possessed substantial authority in the area. By gaining the trust of Eqbal al-Saltaneh, Amir-Tahmasebi successfully convinced him to leave his fortified base and travel to Tabriz, the capital of Azerbaijan. Eqbal al-Saltaneh was arrested upon arrival and died shortly thereafter in prison from a heart attack. His massive wealth and lands were permanently seized, and the revenue was dispatched to Reza Khan in Tehran.

At the beginning of 1925, Reza Khan, who was now also the prime minister, went to Azerbaijan to seemingly review and praise the advancements achieved by Amir-Tahmasebi. However, his actual objective was to guarantee that Amir-Tahmasebi was removed from his post. Reza Khan had Amir-Tahmasebi accompany him back to Tehran, where he was appointed as the Parliamentary Under-Secretary within the Ministry of War. Amir-Tahmasebi was soon installed as the military governor of Tehran to setup the dethronement of Ahmad Shah, a plan which had recently begun.

=== Under the Pahlavi dynasty ===
The Majles (parliament) voted on 1 November 1925 to abolish the Qajar dynasty and install a provisional government led by Reza Khan. The next night, Amir-Tahmasebi was given the duty of accompanying the Qajar crown Prince Mohammad-Hasan Mirza from the Golestan Palace to the frontier with Iraq. On December 19, 1925, the new Pahlavi dynasty established its first cabinet, which remained active for a brief six months with Mohammad-Ali Foroughi acting as Prime Minister and Amir-Tahmasebi acting as Minister of War. In 1927, Amir-Tahmasebi obtained an appointment as Minister of Public Utilities and Commerce, which occurred a few months after Mehdi Qoli Hedayat set up a new cabinet. Amir-Tahmasebi quickly launched various modernization plans. In early 1928, he was shot by bandits while he was inspecting roads under construction in the Lorestan province. Though several surgeons were brought by plane from Tehran to assist him, he died from his wounds at a hospital in Borujerd at the age of 47. Reza Shah quickly went to Borujerd to attend the funeral, and declared a national day of mourning.

Amir-Tahmasebi is known to have written a historical narrative recording the transfer of leadership to Reza Shah.

== Sources ==
- Aqeli, Baqer (2002). "Amir-Ṭahmāsebi, ʿAbd-Allāh". In Yarshater, Ehsan (ed.). Encyclopædia Iranica (Online ed.). Encyclopædia Iranica Foundation. ISBN 978-0710090904.
- Shambayati, Niloofar (1993). "Coup D'etat of 1299/1921". In Yarshater, Ehsan (ed.). Encyclopædia Iranica (Online ed.). Encyclopædia Iranica Foundation. ISBN 978-1568590073.
