= Ahmad Khan Bayat =

- Khan of Maku
- Reign: 1747 – 1778
- Successor: Hassan Khan Bayat & Hoseyn Khan Bayat
- Dynasty: Bayat dynasty
- Religion: Islam

Ahmad Khan Bayat was the first khan of the Maku Khanate from 1747 to 1778.

Preceded by	Khan of Maku; 1747—1778	Succeeded by Hassan Khan & Hoseyn Khan
