= Hassan Khan Bayat =

- Khan of Maku
- Reign: 1778 – 1822
- Predecessor: Ahmad Khan Bayat
- Successor: Ali Khan Bayat
- Dynasty: Bayat dynasty
- Religion: Islam

Hassan Khan Bayat was the second khan of the Maku Khanate from 1778 to 1822. He and his brother were the khan jointly.

Preceded by Ahmad Khan Bayat	Khan of Maku; 1778—1822	Succeeded by Ali Khan Bayat
