= Mortezaqoli Eqbal al-Saltaneh Makui =

Khan of Maku
- Reign: 1895–1923
- Predecessor: Teymur Pasha Khan
- Born: 1863
- Died: 10 May 1924 (aged 60 or 61); Tehran, Qajar Iran
- Religion: Shia Islam

Mortezaqoli Eqbal al-Saltaneh Makui (Persian: مرتضی‌قلی اقبال‌السلطنه ماکویی) was the seventh khan of the Maku Khanate from 1895 to 1923. Born in 1863, he was the son and successor of Teymur Pasha Khan.

He initially persisted in the khanate's policies of isolation and growth, but this made every faction distrust him. This included the Russians, who forced him to stay in Tiflis at the start of World War I. Maku eventually found itself in the combat zone. Its station became an active center when Russian troops constructed a light railway from Shah-takhti (on the Aras river) to Bayazad.

Despite continuous orders from the Iranian government to remain neutral and stop aggressors from passing through his territory, Eqbal al-Saltaneh permitted Turkish nationalist forces access to his territory in November 1920 in order to attack Armenian nationalists.

The governor-general of Azerbaijan, Abdollah Amir-Tahmasebi convinced Eqbal al-Saltaneh to leave his fortified base and travel to the provincial capital Tabriz. In January 1924, Eqbal al-Saltaneh was imprisoned there by the commander-in-chief Reza Khan, who had his possessions seized. Ten camel loads of gold, twenty camel loads of silver, and three locked Russian safes with unidentified contents were among his seized belongings. An officer was installed as the governor of Maku. Eqbal al-Saltaneh was soon moved to a prison in Tehran, where he was killed on 10 May 1924, reportedly under the orders of Reza Khan.

== Sources ==
- Aqeli, Baqer (2002). "Amir-Ṭahmāsebi, ʿAbd-Allāh". In Yarshater, Ehsan (ed.). Encyclopædia Iranica (Online ed.). Encyclopædia Iranica Foundation. ISBN 978-0710090904.
- Kia, Mehrdad (2023). The Clash of Empires and the Rise of Kurdish Proto-Nationalism, 1905–1926: Ismail Agha Simko and the Campaign for an Independent Kurdish State. Springer Nature. ISBN 978-3031449727.
- Minorsky, Vladimir (1991). "Mākū". In Bosworth, C. E.; van Donzel, E. & Pellat, Ch. (eds.). The Encyclopaedia of Islam, Second Edition. Volume VI: Mahk–Mid. Leiden: E. J. Brill. ISBN 978-90-04-08112-3.
- Rahnema, Ali (2023). The Political History of Modern Iran: Revolution, Reaction and Transformation, 1905 to the Present. Bloomsbury Publishing. ISBN 978-0755643998.

Preceded by Teymur Pasha Khan	Khan of Maku; 1895–1923	Succeeded by
