= Ali Khan Bayat =

Fourth khan of the Maku Khanate

- Khan of Maku
- Reign: 1822 – 1866
- Predecessor: Hassan Khan Bayat & Hoseyn Khan Bayat
- Successor: Haji Ismaeil Khan Bayat
- Dynasty: Bayat dynasty
- Religion: Islam

Ali Khan Bayat was the fourth khan of the Maku Khanate from 1822 to 1866.

Preceded by Hassan Khan Bayat & Hoseyn Khan Bayat	Khan of Maku; 1822—1866	Succeeded by Haji Ismaeil Khan Bayat
