= Hoseyn Khan Bayat =

- Khan of Maku
- Reign: 1778 – 1822
- Predecessor: Ahmad Khan Bayat
- Successor: Ali Khan Bayat
- Dynasty: Bayat dynasty
- Religion: Islam

Hoseyn Khan Bayat was the second khan of the Maku Khanate from 1778 to 1822. He and his brother were the khan jointly. His great-grandson was Alexander Makinsky.

Preceded by Ahmad Khan Bayat	Khan of Maku; 1778—1822	Succeeded by Ali Khan Bayat
