= Teymur Pasha Khan =

- Khan of Maku

Iqbal ul-Saltaneh
- Reign: 1866 – 1895
- Predecessor: Haji Ismaeil Khan Bayat
- Successor: Mortezaqoli Eqbal al-Saltaneh Makui
- Born: Maku, Iranian Azerbaijan, Qajar Iran
- Died: Maku, Iranian Azerbaijan, Qajar Iran
- Issue: Mortezaqoli Eqbal al-Saltaneh Makui(Sardar-e Maku)
- Dynasty: Bayat dynasty
- Religion: Islam

Muqarrab ul-Khaqan; Teymur Pasha Khan; Iqbal ul-Saltaneh Maku'i (The Will of the Empire) Also known as "Teymur Teymori" was the sixth khan of the Maku Khanate from 1866 to 1895.

Preceded by Haji Ismaeil Khan Bayat	Khan of Maku; 1866—1895	Succeeded by Murtuzaqulu Khan Bayat
