= Dmitry Staroselsky =

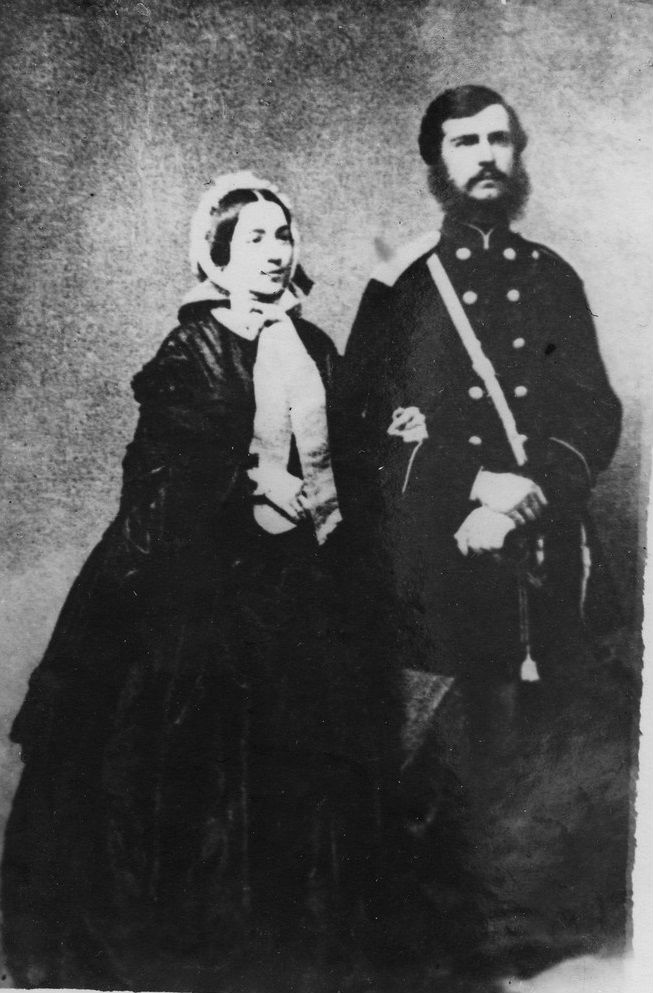
- Dmitry with Princess Guramishvili

Governor of Baku
- In office 10 April 1872 – 13 June 1876
- Preceded by: Mikhail Kolyubakin
- Succeeded by: Valeriy Pozen

Personal details
- Born: May 27, 1832 Chernigov Governorate, Russian Empire
- Died: March 23, 1884 (aged 51) Tiflis, Tiflis Governorate, Russian Empire

Military service
- Rank: Lieutenant general
- Unit: Noble Regiment; Moscow Guard Regiment; 2nd Guards Infantry Division; 14th Georgian Grenadier Regiment
- Battles/wars: Caucasian War

Dmitry Semyonovich Staroselsky (Russian: Дмитрий Семенович Старосельский) (1832 – 1884) was a Russian general and bureaucrat who served as a Governor of Baku from 1872 to 1875 and Chief of the Administration of the Viceroy of the Caucasus from 1878 to 1884. He was the Great-Grandfather of General John Shalikashvili, Chairman of the Joint Chiefs of Staff.

== Early education and career ==
He was brought up at first in the Poltava Petrovsky Cadet Corps, and in 1848 he finished the course first place with his name was entered on the gold plaque. After completing the course in the corps, he was transferred to the Noble Regiment, from which in August 1850 he was released as an ensign in the Moscow Guard Regiment, where he served for six years. In October 1856, Lieutenant Staroselsky was appointed senior adjutant of the 2nd Guards Infantry Division.

== Service in Caucasus ==
He was transferred as an adjutant to the Governor-General of Kutaisi, Baron Alexander Wrangel, with the rank of captain, to the Georgian Grenadier Regiment in December 1857. With the appointment of Baron Wrangel as the commander of the troops in the Caspian region, Staroselsky went with him to Temir-Khan-Shura. In 1859, under the personal command of the commander-in-chief, Prince Baryatinsky, several detachments were formed for simultaneous action from different sides against Shamil. The most important and difficult operations fell to the lot of the detachment of Baron Wrangel. Overcoming high mountain ranges, making the famous Sagrytlo crossing over the Andi Koisu and pursuing the opponent, the detachment approached Gunib, the last stronghold of Shamil, who, after negotiations, surrendered on terms of honor for him.

Staroselsky was posted for military service in the Caucasus in the 1850s and rose to rank of major general in 1868. During his tenure in the Caucasus, Staroselsky maintained good relations with the Georgian and Azeri intelligentsia, and supported their cultural endeavors. He was appointed as Governor of Baku and established Bakinskiye Izvestiya ("Baku News") in 1872 and helped Hasan bey Zardabi to publish Akinchi ("The Ploughman"), the first Azeri-language newspaper, in 1875. He helped compile reports about the life of Caucasian mountaineers published in Tiflis between 1868 and 1875.

In 1875, when a terrible monetary crisis broke out over the oil industry and the question of abolishing the excise system arose, Staroselsky took the side of the industrialists, arguing that the narrow-fiscal attitude of the excise administration to this matter put the latter in an abnormally difficult position.

Staroselsky was appointed to a higher administrative post - director of the Department of the Main Directorate of the Caucasus Viceroyalty on June 1, 1876. The city duma of Baku unanimously elected him an honorary citizen of Baku before he left. On January 1, 1878, he was promoted to lieutenant general, and on August 23, he was appointed head of the Main Directorate of the Viceroy of the Caucasus for the civil part, which he remained until the abolition of the viceroyalty.

== Governing policy ==
He was described as an energetic and humane person who tried to carry out all his reforms peacefully, without resorting to weapons. In his opinion, state interests in relation to the Caucasus required the widest possible development and application of the basic principles of civilization, of which the following seemed to him the most urgent and expedient for the success of the Caucasus and its early merger with Russia:

1. Laying along the edge of the railways and connecting them with a common network of those in the state
2. The widest possible spread and consolidation of public education among the natives; the establishment for this purpose of teachers' seminaries, and before their introduction - the founding of the largest possible number of primary schools with teaching in them in native languages
3. The expansion of methods for the earliest and satisfactory arrangement of the population and land relations
4. Improvement of the personnel and the nature of the activities of the lower administration.

These views also determine the nature of Staroselsky's extensive activities as the head of the main department and the closest collaborator of the Grand Duke Mikhail Nikolaevich, and it was by them that he was always guided in his direct or indirect participation in resolving issues related to the civil administration of the Caucasian viceroyalty.

== Later years and death ==
With the transformation of the region and the abolition of the viceroyalty, Staroselsky was appointed senator. He died suddenly, returning home from a dinner party, from heart failure, in Tiflis, 1884.

== Family ==
He was married to Katerina, Princess Guramishvili (1834-1901), who was a sister-in-law of Prince Ilia Chavchavadze, a leading Georgian intellectual of that time. The couple had four sons – Simon, Givi, Nicholas and Vsevolod – and five daughters – Tamara, Nina, Elizabeth, Rusudan and Ketevan. Of these, Vsevolod became a White Russian general and commander of the Persian Cossack Brigade (1918-1920). Nina married Prince Ioseb Shalikashvili; they became grandparents of the American general John Shalikashvili. Givi served in Caucasus Grenadier Artillery Brigade, his granddaughter Irina married, in 1951, Prince Burhaneddin Cem, great-grandson of the last Ottoman Caliph Abdülmecid II. His granddaughter through Rusudan - Catherina (Inna) later married to Alexander Makinsky (1900-1988), vice-president of The Coca-Cola Company. His son Simon was the fiancé of Vera Tolstaya (daughter of Ilya Tolstoy) in the 1930s.
