= Reza Shah =

Shah of Iran from 1925 to 1941

Reza Shah Pahlavi
- King of Kings
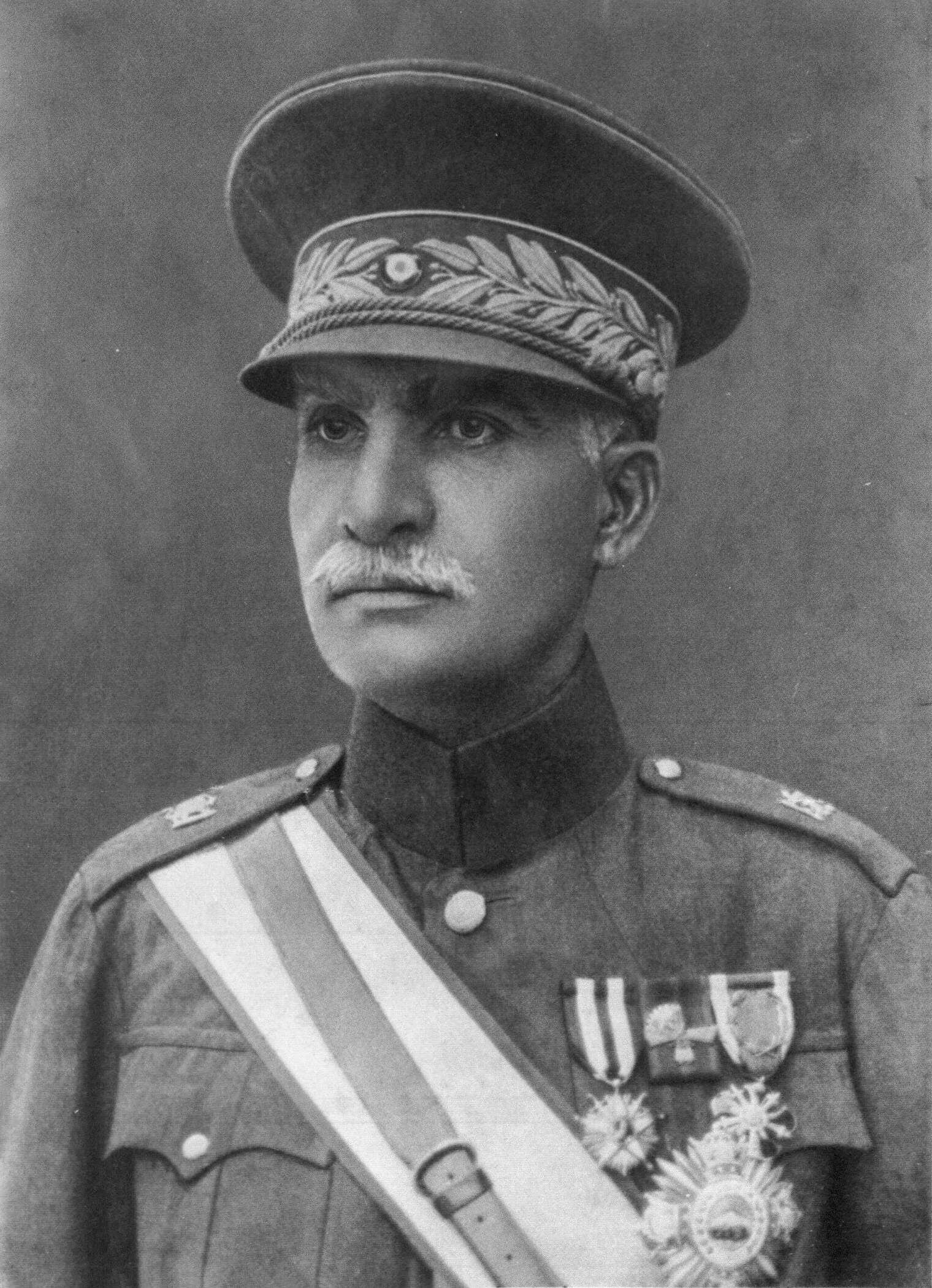
- Formal portrait, c. 1931

Shah of Iran
- Reign: 15 December 1925 – 16 September 1941
- Coronation: 25 April 1926
- Predecessor: Ahmad Shah Qajar
- Successor: Mohammad Reza Pahlavi
Pre-royal positions
President of the Provisional Government
In office 31 October 1925 – 15 December 1925
Preceded by	Ahmad Shah Qajar
Succeeded by	Himself (as Shah of Iran)
16th Prime Minister of Iran
In office 28 October 1923 – 1 November 1925
Monarch	Ahmad Shah Qajar
Preceded by	Hassan Pirnia
Succeeded by	Mohammad Ali Foroughi (Acting); Mostowfi ol-Mamalek
Minister of War
In office 24 April 1921 – 1 November 1925
Monarch	Ahmad Shah Qajar
Prime Minister	Zia ol Din Tabatabaee; Ahmad Qavam; Hassan Pirnia; Ahmad Qavam; Mostowfi ol-Mamalek; Hassan Pirnia; Himself
Preceded by	Masoud Kayhan
Succeeded by	Abdollah Amir-Tahmasebi
Commander of the Persian Cossack Brigade
In office 14 January 1921 – 6 December 1921
Monarch	Ahmad Shah Qajar
Prime Minister	Fathollah Khan Akbar; Zia ol Din Tabatabaee; Ahmad Qavam
Preceded by	Ghassem Khan Vali
Succeeded by	Office Abolished
- Born: 15 March 1878; Alasht, Iran
- Died: 26 July 1944 (aged 66); Johannesburg, South Africa
- Burial: 1944; Al-Rifa'i Mosque, Cairo, Egypt; 7 May 1950; Mausoleum of Reza Shah, Rey, Iran
- Spouse: Maryam Savadkoohi (m. 1895; died 1911) Tadj ol-Molouk Ayromlu (m. 1916) Turan Amirsoleimani (m. 1922; div. 1923) Esmat Dowlatshahi (m. 1923)
- Issue: Princess Hamdam al-Saltaneh; Princess Shams; Mohammad Reza Shah; Princess Ashraf; Prince Ali Reza; Prince Gholam Reza; Prince Abdul Reza; Prince Ahmad Reza; Prince Mahmoud Reza; Princess Fatemeh; Prince Hamid Reza
Names
- Reza Pahlavi; Persian: رضا پهلوی
Posthumous name
- Reza Shah the Great; Persian: رضا‌شاه بزرگ
- House: Pahlavi
- Father: Abbas-Ali Khan
- Mother: Noush-Afarin
- Religion: Twelver Shia Islam
- Military career
- Allegiance: Qajar Iran (1894–1925); Pahlavi Iran (1925–1941)
- Branch: Persian Cossack Brigade (1894–1921); Imperial Iranian Army (1921–1941)
- Service years: 1894–1941
- Rank: Brigadier General (1921–1925); Sardar Sepah (Commander-in-Chief) (1925–1941)
- Conflicts: Persian Constitutional Revolution; World War I; Persian campaign; Jungle Movement of Gilan; Kurdish separatism in Iran; Simko Shikak revolt (1918–1922); Lakestan incident; Battle of Miandoab; Simko Shikak revolt (1926); Mohammad Khiabani's uprising; Pessian's Khorasan Revolt; 1921 Persian coup d'état; Luri tribal insurgency in Pahlavi Iran; Arab separatism in Khuzestan; Sheikh Khazal rebellion; Turkoman Rebellion in Eastern Iran (1924–1926); Persian conquest of West Baluchistan (1928–1935); Persian tribal uprisings of 1929; Jafar Sultan revolt; Goharshad Mosque rebellion; World War II; Anglo-Soviet invasion of Iran

Reza Shah Pahlavi (Note: Persian: رضاشاه پهلوی [ɾeˈzɒː ˈʃɒːhe pʰæhlæˈviː].) (previously Reza Khan; 15 March 1878 – 26 July 1944) was Shah of Iran from 1925 to 1941 and founder of the Pahlavi dynasty. Originally an army officer, he became a politician, serving as minister of war and prime minister of Iran, and was elected shah following the deposition of Ahmad Shah, the last monarch of the Qajar dynasty.

Joining the Persian Cossack Brigade at age 14, he rose through the ranks, becoming a brigadier-general by 1921. In February 1921, as leader of the entire Cossack Brigade based in Qazvin province, he marched towards Tehran and seized the capital. He forced the dissolution of the government and installed Zia ol Din Tabatabaee as the new prime minister. Reza Khan's first role in the new government was commander-in-chief of the army and the minister of war. Two years after the coup, Reza Pahlavi became Iran's prime minister, backed by the compliant national assembly of Iran. In 1925, the constituent assembly deposed Ahmad Shah and amended Iran's 1906 constitution to allow the election of Reza Pahlavi as the Shah of Iran. He founded the Pahlavi dynasty that lasted until it was overthrown in 1979 by the Iranian Revolution.

In an effort to reduce British and Russian influence, Reza Shah initially sought partnerships with the United States and Weimar Germany until 1931. Thereafter, he turned to the First Republic of Czechoslovakia and Denmark, drawing on the Czech industrial firm Škoda Works and Scandinavian engineering consortium Kampsax to advance the development of Iran’s infrastructure, military, and industry during the 1930s. Reza Shah's reign ended when he was forced to abdicate after the Anglo-Soviet invasion of Iran in 1941, during the Second World War; he was succeeded by his eldest son, Mohammad Reza Shah. A modernizer, Reza Shah clashed with the Shia clergy and introduced social, economic, and political reforms during his reign, ultimately laying the foundations of the modern Iranian state. Therefore, he is regarded by many as the founder of modern Iran.

His legacy remains controversial to this day. His defenders say that he was an essential reunifying and modernising force for Iran, while his detractors (particularly the Islamic Republic of Iran) assert that his reign was often despotic, with his failure to modernise Iran's large peasant population eventually sowing the seeds for the Iranian Revolution nearly four decades later, which ended over 2,500 years of Iranian monarchy. Moreover, his insistence on ethnic nationalism and cultural unitarism, along with forced detribalisation and sedentarisation, resulted in the suppression of several ethnic and social groups. Although he was of Iranian Mazanderani descent, his government carried out an extensive policy of Persianization trying to create a single, united and largely homogeneous nation, similar to Mustafa Kemal Atatürk's policy of Turkification in Turkey after the fall of the Ottoman Empire. In the spring of 1950, he was posthumously named as Reza Shah the Great (رضا شاه بزرگ) by Iran's National Consultative Assembly.

== Early life ==
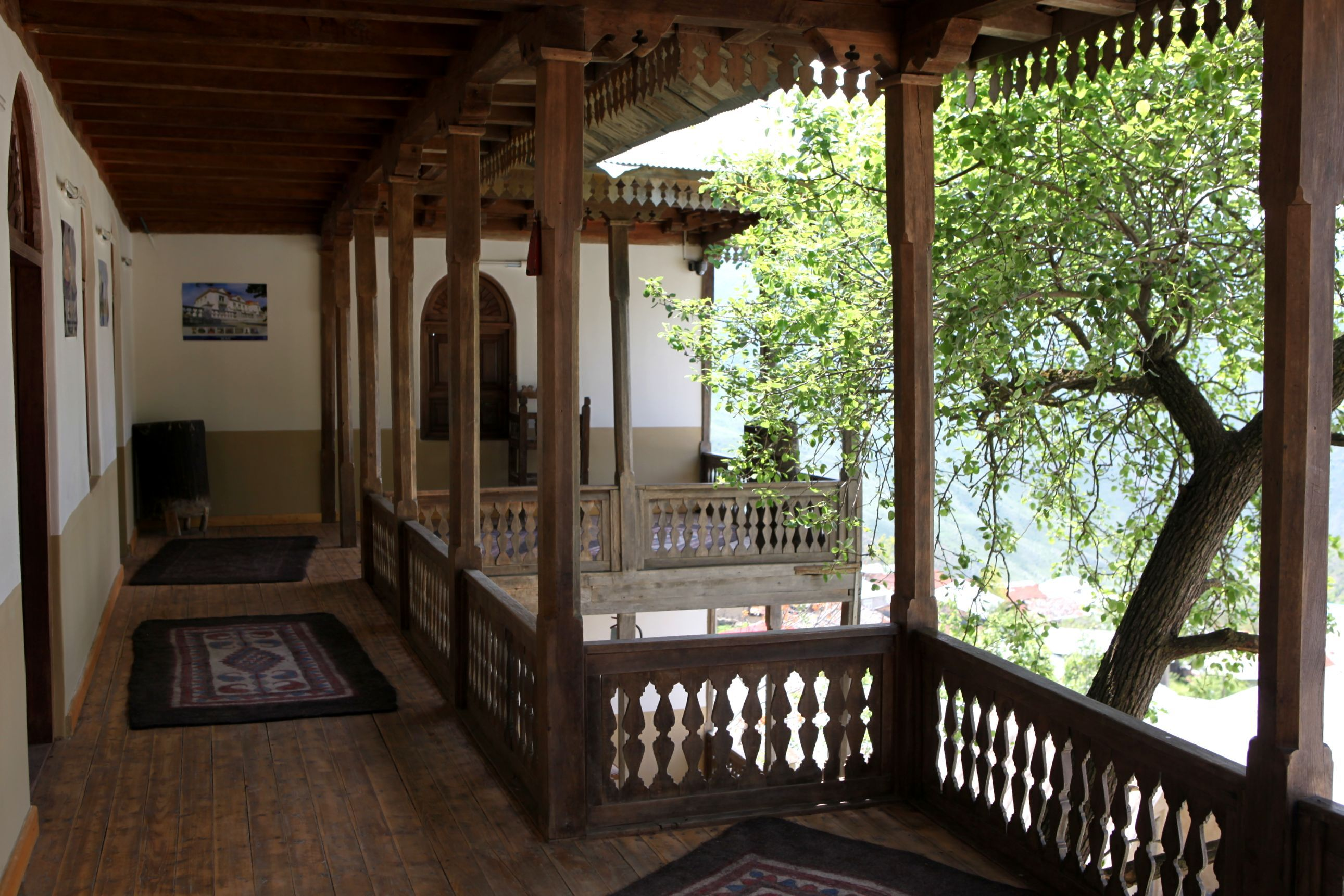
Museum of Reza Shah Pahlavi, the house where he was born, in Alasht

Reza Khan was born on 15 March 1878 in the town of Alasht in Savadkuh County, Mazandaran province, to Major Abbas-Ali Khan and his wife Noush-Afarin. His mother, Noush-Afarin Ayromlu, was an immigrant from Georgia or Yerevan (then part of the Russian Empire), whose family had emigrated to Qajar Iran when it was forced to cede all of its territories in the Caucasus following the Russo-Persian Wars several decades prior to Reza Shah's birth. His father was a Mazanderani, and a member of the Palani clan, who was commissioned in the 7th Savadkuh Regiment, and served in the Second Herat War of 1856.

Abbas-Ali died suddenly on 26 November 1878, when Reza was 8 months old. Upon his father's death, Reza and his mother moved to her brother's house in Tehran. She remarried in 1879 and left Reza to the care of his uncle. In 1882, his uncle in turn sent Reza to a family friend, Amir Tuman Kazim Khan, an officer in the Persian Cossack Brigade, in whose home he had a room of his own and a chance to study with Kazim Khan's children with the tutors who came to the house. When Reza was sixteen years old, he joined the Persian Cossack Brigade. In 1903, when he was 25 years old, he is reported to have been a guard and servant to the Dutch consul general Fridolin Marinus Knobel. Maurits Wagenvoort, who met and spoke to Reza at a meeting of the "Babi-circle of Hadsji Achont" in Tehran in 1903, in a publication from 1926 speaks of him as the "gholam of His Presence the Dutch Consul" and noted his very keen interest in Western politics.

Reza served in the Imperial Army. His career started as a private under Qajar Prince Abdol-Hossein Farman Farma's command. Farman Farma noted that Reza had potential and sent him to military school where he gained the rank of gunnery sergeant. In 1911, he gave a good account of himself in later campaigns and was promoted to First Lieutenant. His proficiency in handling machine guns elevated him to the rank equivalent to captain in 1912. By 1915, he was promoted to the rank of Colonel. His record of military service eventually led him to a commission as a Brigadier General in the Persian Cossack Brigade. In November 1919, he chose the last name Pahlavi, which later became the name of the dynasty he founded.

== Rise to power ==
=== 1921 coup ===
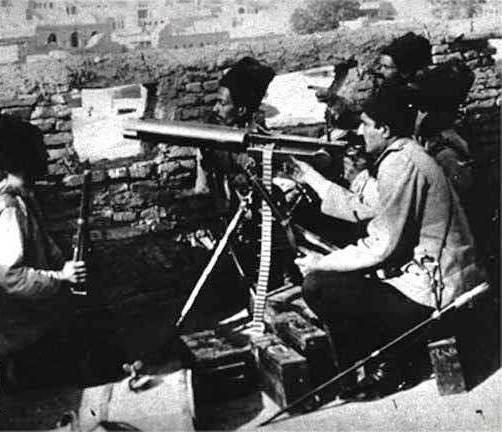
Reza Pahlavi behind a machine gun

In the aftermath of the Russian Revolution, Persia had become a battleground. In 1917, Britain used Iran as the springboard to launch an expedition into Russia as part of their intervention in the Russian Civil War on the side of the White movement. The Soviet Union responded by annexing portions of northern Persia, creating the Persian Socialist Soviet Republic. The Soviets extracted ever more humiliating concessions from the Qajar government, whose ministers Ahmad Shah was often unable to control. By 1920, the government had lost virtually all power outside its capital: British and Soviet forces exercised control over most of the Iranian mainland. In late 1920, the Soviets in Rasht prepared to march on Tehran with "a guerrilla force of 1,500 Jangalis, Kurds, Armenians, and Azerbaijanis", reinforced by the Soviet Red Army. This, along with various other unrest in the country, created "an acute political crisis in the capital".

On 14 January 1921, the commander of the British Forces in Iran, General Edmund "Tiny" Ironside, promoted Reza Khan, who had been leading the Tabriz battalion, to lead the entire brigade. About a month later, under British direction, Reza Khan led his 3,000-4,000-strong detachment of the Cossack Brigade, based in Niyarak, Qazvin, and Hamadan, to Mehrabad (then on the outskirts of Tehran). As negotiations with the Qajar representatives broke down and the Cossacks advanced toward the capital, Sardar Homayoun ordered the artillery units to fire on the approaching forces in an attempt to halt the uprising. A young officer named Mahmud Mir-Djalali, who was serving as the artillery unit commander at the old gates of Tehran, controlling access to the city, made the ultimate decision to disobey these orders. Instead of opening fire on the Cossacks, he commanded that the gates of Tehran be opened, allowing Reza Khan and his forces to enter the city unchallenged and seize the capital. Additionally, Mir-Djalali personally had two cannon rounds fired over Golestan Palace, serving as a signal that the coup had reached the heart of the city. The sound of the cannon fire reportedly terrified Ahmad Shah Qajar, breaking his already wavering resolve to resist. He retreated to the Farahabad Palace, where he ultimately surrendered to Reza Khan.

He forced the dissolution of the previous government and demanded that Zia ol Din Tabatabaee be appointed prime minister. Reza Khan's first role in the new government was as commander of the Iranian Army, which he combined with the post of Minister of War. He took the title Sardar Sepah (Persian: سردار سپاه), or Commander-in-Chief of the Army, by which he was known until he became Shah. While Reza Khan and his Cossack brigade secured Tehran, the Persian envoy in Moscow negotiated a treaty with the Bolsheviks for the removal of Soviet troops from Persia. Article IV of the Russo-Persian Treaty of Friendship allowed the Soviets to invade and occupy Persia, should they believe foreign troops were using it as a staging area for an invasion of Soviet territory.

The coup d'état of 1921 was partially assisted by the British government, which wished to halt the Bolsheviks' penetration of Iran, particularly because of the threat it posed to the British Raj. It is thought that the British provided "ammunition, supplies and pay" for Reza's troops. On 8 June 1932, a British Embassy report states that the British were interested in helping Reza Shah create a centralizing power. General Ironside gave a situation report to the British War Office saying that a capable Persian officer was in command of the Cossacks and this "would solve many difficulties and enable us to depart in peace and honour". Reza Khan spent the rest of 1921 securing Iran's interior, responding to a number of revolts that erupted against the new government. The Kucheck Khan government called itself the "Persian Soviet Socialist Republic."

=== Overthrow of the Qajar dynasty ===
After the coup Seyyed Zia ol Din Tabatabaee was appointed prime minister with the support of Reza Khan, but his premiership quickly faced resistance. Provincial governors such as Mohammad Mossadegh in Fars and Ahmad Qavam in Khorasan refused to recognize his government, while the aristocracy turned against him after the arrest of around eighty grandees on corruption charges. He also failed to shed his reputation as a British mouthpiece, yet increasingly lost British enthusiasm by not fully meeting their demands. Relations with Ahmad Shah were equally hostile, with each seeking the other’s removal.

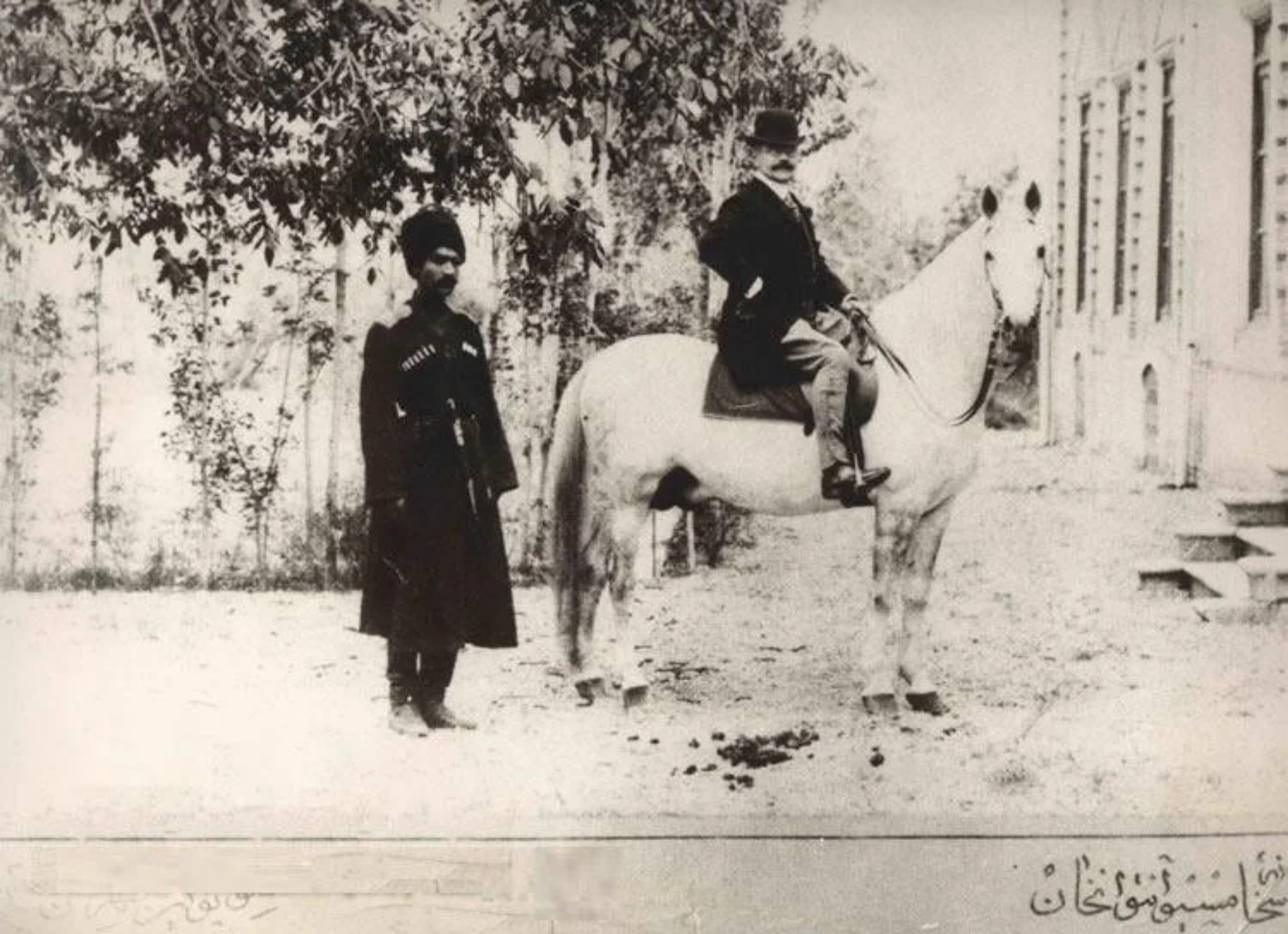
Reza Shah and Fridolin Marinus Knobel, Dutch Consul General in Tehran

The final rupture came when Seyyed Zia tried to appoint about twenty British officers to military posts at Qazvin without consulting Reza Khan, whom the Shah had confirmed as minister of war and commander of the Cossack Brigade. Reza Khan objected, demanded the officers’ removal, and forced Seyyed Zia to transfer control of the Gendarmerie from the Interior Ministry to him, effectively placing most of Iran’s armed forces under his authority. With Seyyed Zia politically isolated, Reza Khan coerced him to resign and leave Tehran despite British objections, worsening relations between Britain and the new minister of war.

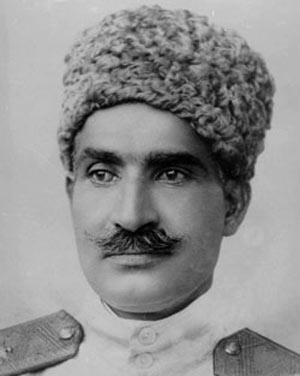
Reza Pahlavi portrait during his time as war minister

Although Tehran had been secured, much of Iran remained outside effective central control. Mirza Kuchak Khan held Gilan, the Turkmen chiefs dominated Astarabad, Eqbal al-Saltaneh Makoui controlled northwestern Azarbaijan, the Shahsevan tribe ruled Ardabil and the Mughan plain, tribal Kurdish leaders held parts of western Iran, the Sanjabi and Kalhori tribes dominated Kermanshah, the Qashqai held sway in the south, Baluchi khans such as Bahram Khan and Dost Mohammad Khan controlled the southeast, Sheikh Khaz’al ruled Khuzestan, and the Bakhtiaris remained powerful in central Iran. Even the countryside around Tehran was plagued by banditry at night.

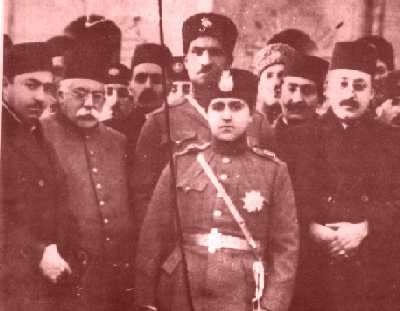
Reza Khan behind Ahmad Shah Qajar, with Abdol-Hossein Farman Farma to the left of Reza Khan

As “Sardar Sepah”, Reza Khan used his control of the army and police in Tehran as the foundation for a broader centralization campaign. He expanded the new army, defeated provincial challengers, and extended government authority through newly established military administrations across the provinces. These methods were often heavy-handed, provoking resentment among political elites and repeated accusations in the Majlis that he was acting dictatorially. In October 1923, Reza Khan became prime minister after implicating his powerful rival and former premier Ahmad Qavam in a plot against his life and forcing him into exile. His first major effort to mobilize popular support for constitutional change came with the republican movement of early 1924. Although public opinion was broadly hostile to Ahmad Shah and receptive to republicanism, Reza Khan sought to present the movement as spontaneous while discreetly encouraging its organization and using popular demonstrations to pressure the Majlis.

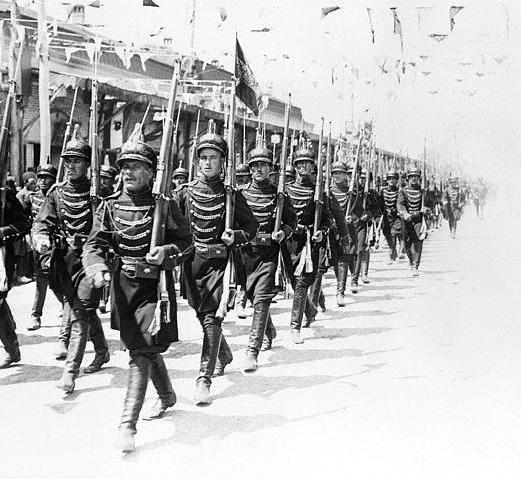
Military parade in Tehran on the occasion of the coronation of Reza Shah, 1926

Radical republicans pressed for the establishment of a republic before Nowruz, and Reza Khan eventually agreed to force the issue. This strategic miscalculation strengthened the opposition led by Seyyed Hassan Modarres and the Reformist Party. After a pro-republican deputy slapped Modarres during debate on 17 March, the dispute spilled into the streets, where rival crowds contested control of the Majlis grounds. By 19 March, clerically led opposition had denied the republicans a parliamentary majority, forcing Reza Khan to abandon the project. He briefly resigned in April, but pressure from provincial army commanders quickly secured his return.

Reza Khan nevertheless remained determined to remove Ahmad Shah. His restoration of central authority over Khuzestan in late 1924 strengthened his political position, although he rejected a premature proposal by supporters to proclaim him shah by popular acclaim. The anti-Qajar campaign then gained momentum in Tabriz, from where agitation spread to other provincial cities and generated increasing pressure for dynastic change. On 28 October 1925, Pahlavist activists in Tabriz issued an ultimatum threatening to raise a volunteer army and march on Tehran if the Majlis continued to resist demands for the removal of the Qajars, and three days later, on 31 October, amid strong government and provincial pressure, the Majlis voted to abolish the Qajar dynasty and place Reza Khan at the head of a provisional government, but having learned from the failure of the republican campaign, Reza Khan did not attempt to force the constitutional change directly through the Majlis, instead, the matter was referred to a constituent assembly, through which the required constitutional formalities were observed without interference. While Tabriz was central to the provincial mobilization behind the change of dynasty, support in Tehran was more limited, and in the following Majlis elections, the capital returned none of the deputies who had voted for the dynastic change.

== Rule as the Shah ==
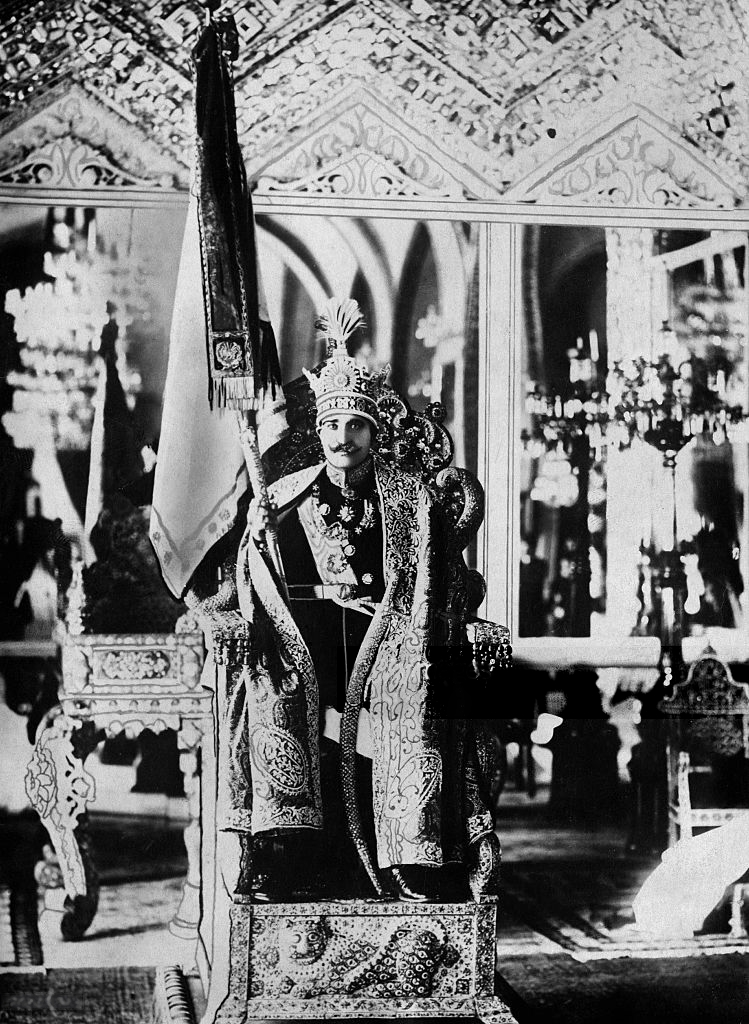
Coronation of Reza Shah Pahlavi

While the Shah left behind no major thesis, or speeches giving an overarching policy, his reforms indicated a striving for an Iran which—according to scholar Ervand Abrahamian—would be "free of clerical influence, nomadic uprisings, and ethnic differences", on the one hand, and on the other hand would contain "European-style educational institutions, Westernized women active outside the home, and modern economic structures with state factories, communication networks, investment banks, and department stores." Reza is said to have avoided political participation and consultation with politicians or political personalities, instead embracing the slogan "every country has its own ruling system and ours is a one man system". He is also said to have preferred punishment to reward in dealing with subordinates or citizens.

Reza Shah's reign has been said to have consisted of "two distinct periods". From 1925 to 1933, figures such as Abdolhossein Teymourtash, Nosrat ol Dowleh Firouz, and Ali-Akbar Davar and many other western-educated Iranians emerged to implement modernist plans, such as the construction of railways, a modern judiciary and educational system, and the imposition of changes in traditional attire, and traditional and religious customs and mores. In the second half of his reign (1933–1941), which the Shah described as "one-man rule", strong personalities like Davar and Teymourtash were removed, and secularist and Western policies and plans initiated earlier were implemented.

=== Modernization ===
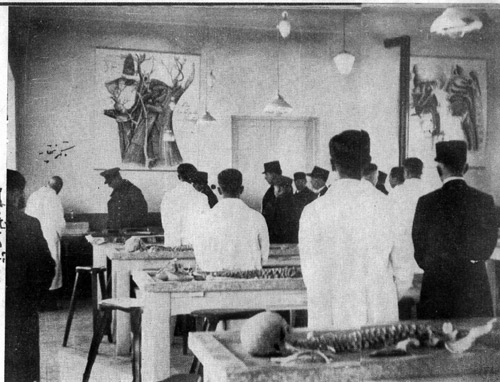
Reza Shah at the opening ceremony of the University of Tehran's Faculty of Medicine.

During Reza Shah's sixteen years of rule, major developments, such as large road construction projects and the Trans-Iranian Railway were built, modern education was introduced and the University of Tehran, the first Iranian university, was established. The number of modern industrial plants increased 17-fold under Reza Shah (excluding oil installations), and the number of miles of highway increased from 2,000 to 14,000. He founded a 100,000-man army (previously, the shah had relied on tribal forces who were rewarded with plunder from the enemy) and a 90,000-man civil service. He set up free, compulsory education for both males and females and shut down private religious schools—Islamic, Christian, Jewish, etc. He confiscated land and real estate from the wealthy shrine endowments at Mashhad and Qom, etc. In Mashhad, the revenues of the sanctuary of Imam Reza helped finance secular education, build a modern hospital, improve the water supply of the city, and underwrite industrial enterprises."

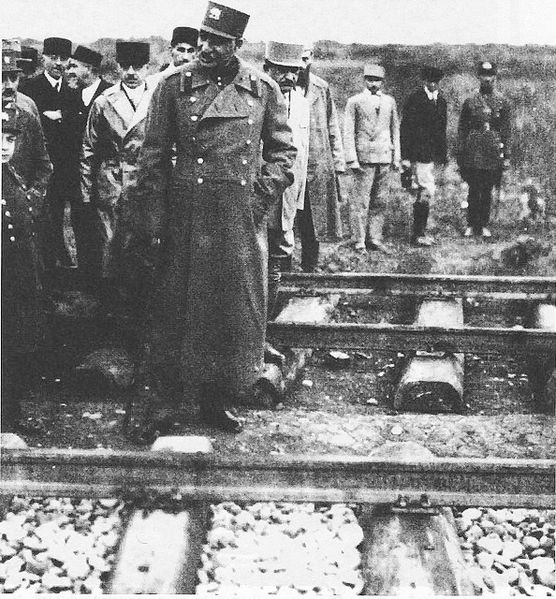
Reza Shah opening a railway station

In 1923, Reza Khan, then Sardar Sepah (Commander in Chief), visited Susa, the main site of French excavation in Iran. Enraged by the sight of a large European castle with a French flag, he remarked, "Did they intend to position an army there up on the hill?" He also received multiple reports of French looting of Susa's antiquities and taking them to France. When Reza Khan ascended the throne in 1925, his court minister, Teymourtash, suggested ending the French monopoly on excavation granted by the Qajar government and appointing a Frenchman as the director of a new archaeological institute. Consequently, the French monopoly was abolished in 1927, and André Godard was appointed director of the archaeological service as a compromise. The Iranian Parliament voted on 29 April 1928, to hire Godard for five years starting from 18 November 1928. Reza Shah preferred Iranian architects. When his favorite daughter, Princess Shams, wanted a garden, she chose a design by French architect André Godard; however, the shah's approval was required for construction within the royal compound. Upon seeing a Latin name on the plans, Reza Shah became visibly angry. Despite assurances that Godard had lived in Iran long enough to be considered virtually Iranian, the shah tore up the plans and insisted that an Iranian architect design the garden.

Along with the modernization of the nation, Reza Shah was the ruler during the time of the Women's Awakening (1936–1941). This movement sought the elimination of the chador from Iranian working society. Supporters held that the veil impeded physical exercise and the ability of women to enter society and contribute to the progress of the nation. This move met opposition from the Mullahs in the religious establishment. The unveiling issue and the Women's Awakening are linked to the Marriage Law of 1931 and the Second Congress of Eastern Women in Tehran in 1932. Reza Shah was the first Iranian Monarch in 1,400 years who paid respect to the Jews by praying in the synagogue when visiting the Jewish community of Isfahan; an act that boosted the self-esteem of the Iranian Jews and made Reza Shah their second most respected Iranian leader after Cyrus the Great. Reza Shah's reforms opened new occupations to Jews and allowed them to leave the ghetto. Contradicting this are claims that he was behind anti-Jewish incidents in parts of Tehran during September 1922. He forbade photographing aspects of Iran he considered backwards such as camels, and he banned clerical dress and chadors in favor of Western dress.

=== Parliament and ministers ===
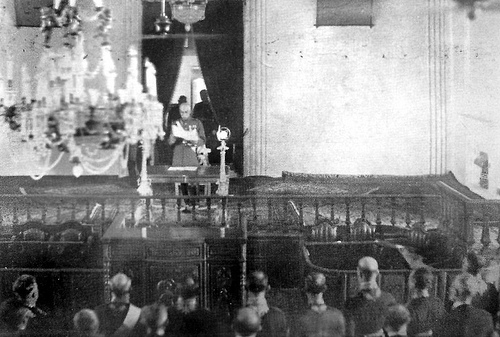
Reza Shah addressing Iranian parliament, 1939

Parliamentary elections during the Shah's reign were not democratic. The general practice was to "draw up, with the help of the police chief, a list of parliamentary candidates for the interior minister. The interior minister then passed the same names onto the provincial governor-general. ... [who] handed down the list to the supervisory electoral councils that were packed by the Interior Ministry to oversee the ballots. Parliament ceased to be a meaningful institution, and instead became a decorative garb covering the nakedness of military rule."

Reza Shah discredited and eliminated a number of his ministers. His minister of Imperial Court, Abdolhossein Teymourtash, was accused and convicted of corruption, bribery, misuse of foreign currency regulations, and plans to overthrow the Shah. He was removed as the minister of court in 1932 and died under suspicious circumstances while in prison in September 1933. The minister of finance, Prince Firouz Nosrat-ed-Dowleh III, who played an important role in the first three years of his reign, was convicted on similar charges in May 1930, and also died in prison, in January 1938. Ali-Akbar Davar, his minister of justice, was suspected of similar charges and committed suicide in February 1937. The elimination of these ministers "deprived" Iran "of her most dynamic figures ... and the burden of government fell heavily on Reza Shah" according to historian Cyrus Ghani.

Mirza Ali Asghar Khan Hekmat funded the construction of key cultural and educational sites in Iran, including the University of Tehran, the Ancient Iran Museum (later the Iran National Museum), and the tombs of Ferdowsi, Hafez, and Saadi. His account of building the university and the medical school's first dissection hall reveals the cultural challenges faced during Iran's modernization. In a 1934 ministerial meeting, Hekmat pointed out that Tehran lacked a university. Reza Shah immediately tasked Hekmat with establishing one, allocating a budget of 250,000 Toman. Before, Shah had ordered ten students annually to study in Europe and the United States. Reza Shah advised against sending more students abroad, suggesting the establishment of a university in Tehran instead. From 1937, the University of Tehran admitted both men and women to study law, medicine, pharmacology, and literature.

Ali Asghar Hekmat enlisted Godard to design the University of Tehran, using the 200,000-square-meter Jalaliyah Garden for the project. In 1935, the Ebne Sina Medical School opened first, adorned with calligraphy from Nezami's poems praising knowledge. Despite strong opposition from conservative clerics who opposed the dissection hall, efforts by figures like Hekmat ensured the school's opening. Dr. Bakhtiar, a surgeon and deputy, had to discreetly visit hospitals, retrieve corpses, load them into his car, and transport them to the dissection hall.

=== Replacement of Persia with Iran ===
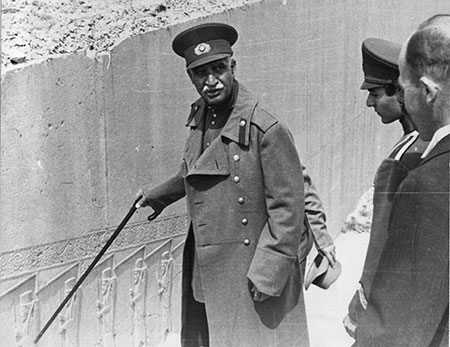
Reza Shah at Persepolis

In the Western world, Persia (or its cognates) was historically the common name for Iran. In 1935, Reza Shah asked foreign delegates and League of Nations to use the term Iran ("Land of the Aryans"), the endonym of the country, used by its native people, in formal correspondence. Since then, the use of the word "Iran" has become more common in the Western world. This also changed the usage of the names for the Iranian nationality, and the common adjective for citizens of Iran changed from Persian to Iranian. In 1959, the government of Shah Mohammad Reza Pahlavi, Reza Shah Pahlavi's son and successor, announced that both "Persia" and "Iran" could officially be used interchangeably, nonetheless use of "Iran" continued to supplant "Persia", especially in the West. Although the predominant and official language of the country was the Persian language, many did not consider themselves ethnic Persians, whereas "Iranians" made for a much more neutral and unifying reference to all the ethnic groups of Iran; furthermore, "Persia" (locally known as Pars) was geographically confusing at times as it was also the name of one of Iran's significant cultural provinces. Although internally the country had been referred to as Iran throughout much of its history since the Sasanian Empire, many countries including the English-speaking world knew the country as Persia, largely a legacy of the Ancient Greeks’ name for the Achaemenid Empire.

=== Support and opposition ===
Support for the Shah came principally from three sources. The central "pillar" was the military, where the shah had begun his career. The annual defense budget of Iran "increased more than fivefold from 1926 to 1941." Officers were paid more than other salaried employees. The new modern and expanded state bureaucracy of Iran was another source of support. Its ten civilian ministries employed 90,000 full-time government workers. Patronage controlled by the Shah's royal court served as the third "pillar". This was financed by the Shah's considerable personal wealth which had been built up by forced sales and confiscations of estates, making him "the richest man in Iran". On his abdication Reza Shah "left to his heir a bank account of some three million pounds sterling and estates totaling over 3 million acres".

Although the landed aristocracy lost most of their influence during Reza Shah's reign, his regime aroused opposition not from them or the gentry but from Iran's "tribes, the clergy, and the young generation of the new intelligentsia. The tribes bore the brunt of the new order." Among the tribes forcibly settled were the Bakhtiari, Qashqai, Lur, Kurd, Baluchi. According to Sandra Mackey, the settling "shattered tribal economic and undermined the traditional social structure. ... people and herds, ill adapted to a sedentary lifestyle and dependent for hygiene and health on moving campsites from time to time, died in terrible numbers. None have forgotten."

=== Clash with the clergy ===
As his reign became more secure, Reza Shah clashed with Iran's clergy and devout Muslims on many issues. In March 1928, he violated the sanctuary of Qom's Fatima Masumeh Shrine to beat a cleric who had angrily admonished Reza Shah's wife for temporarily exposing her face a day earlier while on pilgrimage to Qom. In December of that year he instituted a law requiring everyone (except Shia jurisconsults who had passed a special qualifying examination) to wear Western clothes. This angered devout Muslims because it included a hat with a brim which prevented the devout from touching their foreheads on the ground during salat as required by Islamic law. The Shah also encouraged women to discard hijab. He announced that female teachers could no longer come to school with head coverings. One of his daughters reviewed a girls' athletic event with an uncovered head. Reza Shah confiscated some religious madrasas from clerics. Esmail Meraat, the Minister of Culture, converted the Marvi Madrasa into a new art college (Honar Kadeh) in Tehran, where Andre Godard and Maxime Siroux were among the teachers; however, the second Pahlavi king, Mohammad Reza Shah, later relocated the art college to the basement of the faculty of engineering at the University of Tehran, returning the madrasa to the clerics.

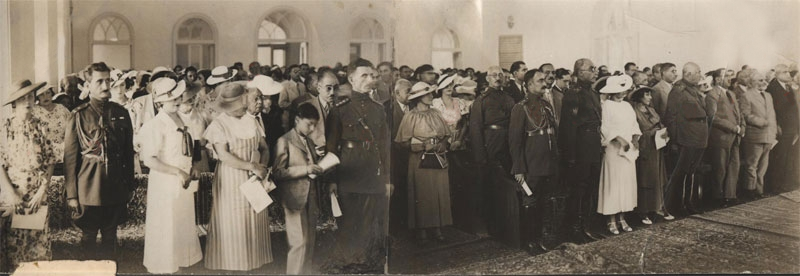
Military commanders of the Iranian armed forces, government officials, and their wives commemorating the abolition of the chadors in 1936

The devout were also angered by policies that allowed mixing of the sexes. Women were allowed to study in the colleges of law and medicine, and in 1934 a law set heavy fines for cinemas, restaurants, and hotels that did not open their doors to both sexes. Doctors were permitted to dissect human bodies, in defiance of the Quranic ban on necropsy (the Shah even forced his cabinet members to "accompany him to the university's pathology lab to view two cadavers in a vat"). He restricted public mourning observances to one day, banned self-flagellation during Ashura, and required mosques to use chairs instead of the traditional sitting on the floors of mosques. By the mid-1930s, Reza Shah's rule had caused intense dissatisfaction with the Shia clergy throughout Iran. In 1935, a rebellion erupted in the Imam Reza Shrine in Mashhad. Responding to a cleric who denounced the Shah's "heretical" innovations, corruption and heavy consumer taxes, many bazaaris and villagers took refuge in the shrine, chanting slogans such as "The Shah is a new Yezid". For four full days local police and army refused to violate the shrine. The standoff was ended when troops from Iranian Azerbaijan arrived and broke into the shrine, killing dozens and injuring hundreds, and marking a final rupture between the clergy and the Shah. Some of the Mashhad clergy even left their jobs, such as the Keeper of the Keys of the shrine Hassan Mazloumi, later named Barjesteh, who stated he did not want to listen to the orders of a dog. From 1925 to 1941, enrollment of "theology students in the traditional madresehs"—roughly the equivalent in age level of secondary schools—declined from 5,984 to 785. The Shah also intensified his controversial changes following the incident with the Kashf-e hijab decree, banning the chador and ordering all citizens, rich and poor, to bring their wives to public functions without head coverings.

=== Foreign affairs and influence ===
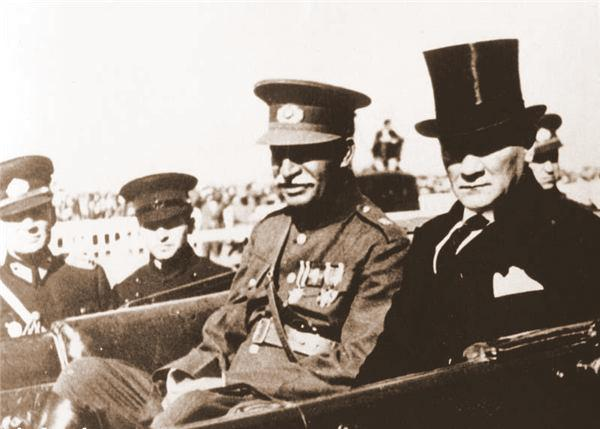
Reza Shah with president Mustafa Kemal Atatürk of Turkey

Reza Shah initiated change in foreign affairs as well. He worked to balance British influence with other foreigners and generally to diminish foreign influence in Iran. One of the first acts of the new government after the 1921 entrance into Tehran was to tear up the treaty with the Soviet Union. In 1934, he made an official state visit to Turkey and met Turkish President Mustafa Kemal Atatürk. During their meeting Reza Shah spoke in Azerbaijani, and Atatürk in Turkish. In 1931, Reza Shah refused to allow Imperial Airways to fly in Persian airspace, instead giving the concession to German-owned Lufthansa Airlines. The next year, 1932, he surprised the British by unilaterally canceling the oil concession awarded to William Knox D'Arcy (and the Anglo-Persian Oil Company), which was slated to expire in 1961. The concession granted Persia 16% of the net profits from APOC oil operations. The Shah wanted 21%. The British took the dispute before the League of Nations. Before a decision was made by the League, the company and Iran compromised and a new concession was signed on 26 April 1933.

Reza Shah previously hired American consultants to develop and implement Western-style financial and administrative systems. Among them was U.S. economist Arthur Millspaugh, who acted as the nation's finance minister. Reza Shah also purchased ships from Italy and hired Italians to teach his sailors the intricacies of naval warfare. He also imported hundreds of German technicians and advisors for various projects. Mindful of Persia's long period of subservience to British and Russian authority, Reza Shah was careful to avoid giving any one foreign nation too much control. He also insisted that foreign advisors be employed by the Persian government, so that they would not be answerable to foreign powers. This was based upon his experience with Anglo-Persian, which was owned and operated by the British government. In his campaign against foreign influence, he annulled the 19th-century capitulations to Europeans in 1928. Under these, Europeans in Iran had enjoyed the privilege of being subject to their own consular courts rather than to the Iranian judiciary. The right to print money was moved from the British Imperial Bank to his National Bank of Iran (Bank-i Melli Iran), as was the administration of the telegraph system, from the Indo-European Telegraph Company to the Iranian government, in addition to the collection of customs by Belgian officials. He eventually fired Millspaugh, and prohibited foreigners from administering schools, owning land or traveling in the provinces without police permission.

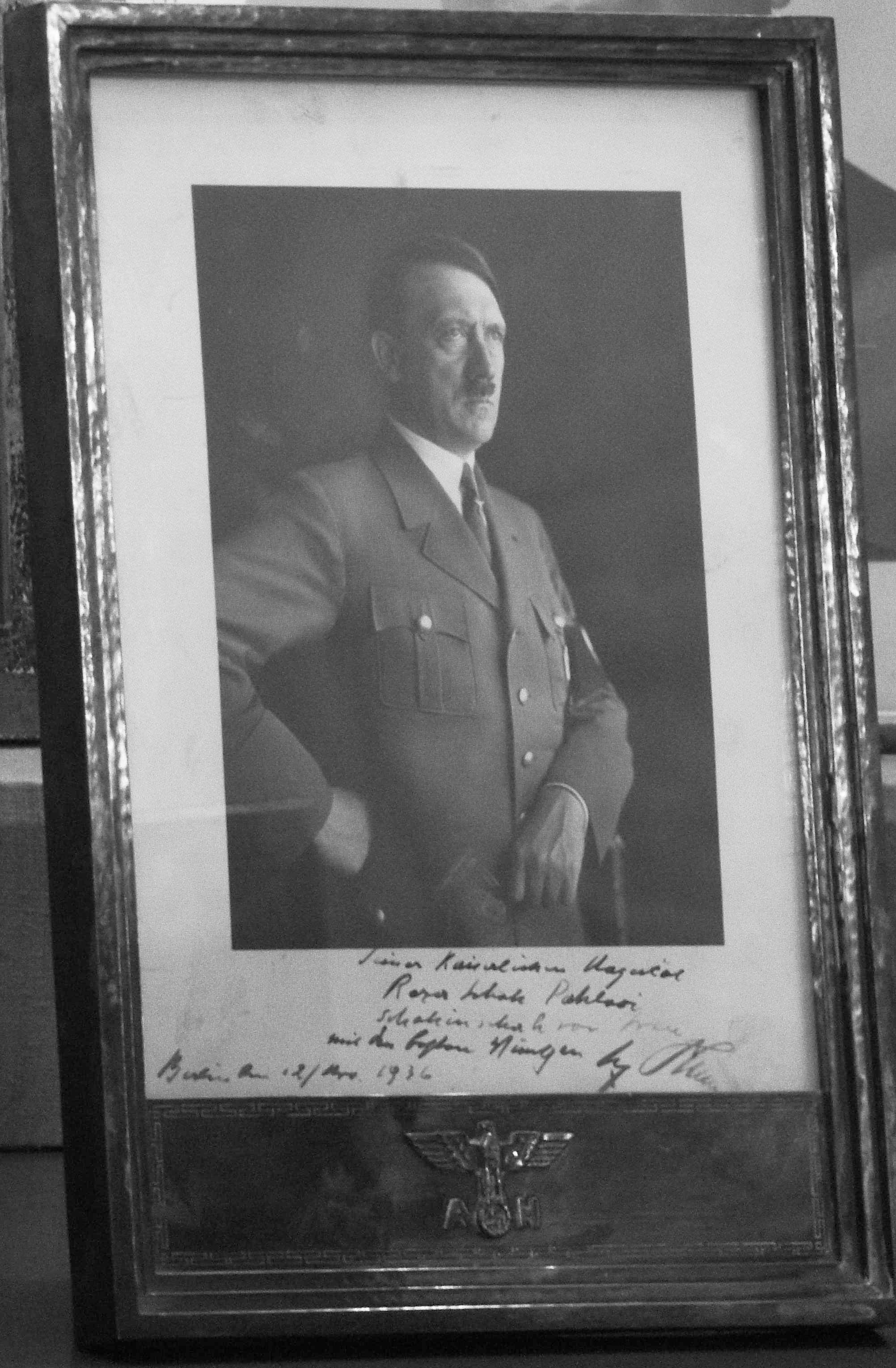
This photograph's inscription reads "His Imperial Majesty – Reza Shah Pahlavi – Shahanshah of Iran – With the Best Wishes – Berlin, 12 Nov. 1936 – Adolf Hitler".

Not all observers agree that the Shah minimized foreign influence. Reza Shah built a 1392 km-long rail line connecting the Persian Gulf with the Caspian Sea, using foreign technicians from countries with no historic interest in Iran—principally Germany, Scandinavia, and the United States—and not using foreign loans. According to Makki Hossein, this north–south railway line was uneconomical, only serving the British, who had a military presence in the south of Iran and desired the ability to transfer their troops north to Russia, as part of their strategic defence plan. Instead, the Shah's government should have developed what critics believe was an economically justifiable east–west railway system. In the decades that followed and continuing into the present, north-south transit is considered far more economically vital in comparison to west–east transit.

On 21 March 1935, Reza Shah issued a decree asking foreign delegates to use the term Iran in formal correspondence, as Persia is a term used for a country identified as Iran in the Persian language. It was attributed more to the Iranian people than others, as Iran means "Land of the Aryans". This wisdom of this decision continues to be debated. Tired of the opportunistic policies of both Britain and the Soviet Union, the Shah circumscribed contacts with foreign embassies. Relations with the Soviet Union had already deteriorated because of that country's commercial policies, which in the 1920s and 1930s adversely affected Iran. In 1932, the Shah cancelled the agreement under which the Anglo-Persian Oil Company produced and exported Iran's oil. Although a new and improved agreement was eventually signed, it did not satisfy Iran's demands and left bad feeling on both sides. Unlike the British and Soviets, Germany was always on good terms with Iran. On the eve of World War II, Germany was Iran's largest ally and trading partner. The Germans agreed to give the Shah the steel factory he coveted and considered a sine qua non of progress and modernity. They began to form a stronger alliance as Iran started helping the Axis forces and Adolf Hitler's cabinet declared Iranians to be immune to the Nuremberg Laws, as they were considered to be the only people besides Germans to be "pure Aryans". In 1939, Hitler provided Iran with their German Scientific Library, which contained over 7,500 books on eugenics "to convince the Persians of the kinship between Germans and the Persians, the modern Aryans and the ancient Aryans". In various pro-Nazi publications, lectures, speeches, and ceremonies, parallels were drawn between the Shah and Hitler, and praises were given to the charisma and the virtue of the Führerprinzip.

Reza Shah's foreign policy, which had consisted largely of playing the Soviet Union off against the United Kingdom, failed when the German invasion of the Soviet Union in 1941 resulted in those two powers becoming sudden allies in the fight against the Axis powers. Seeking to scold this new Axis ally, and to guarantee the continued supply for the United Kingdom and in order to secure a route of supply to provide Soviet forces with war material, the two allies jointly launched a surprise invasion in August 1941. Caught off guard, outgunned, and diplomatically isolated, Reza Shah was defeated by the Anglo-Soviet invasion, ordering his forces to surrender to prevent the world war from reaching Iran, and was forced to abdicate the throne in favor of his son. Reza Shah then was banished into exile while Iran would remain under Allied occupation until 1946.

=== Later years of reign ===
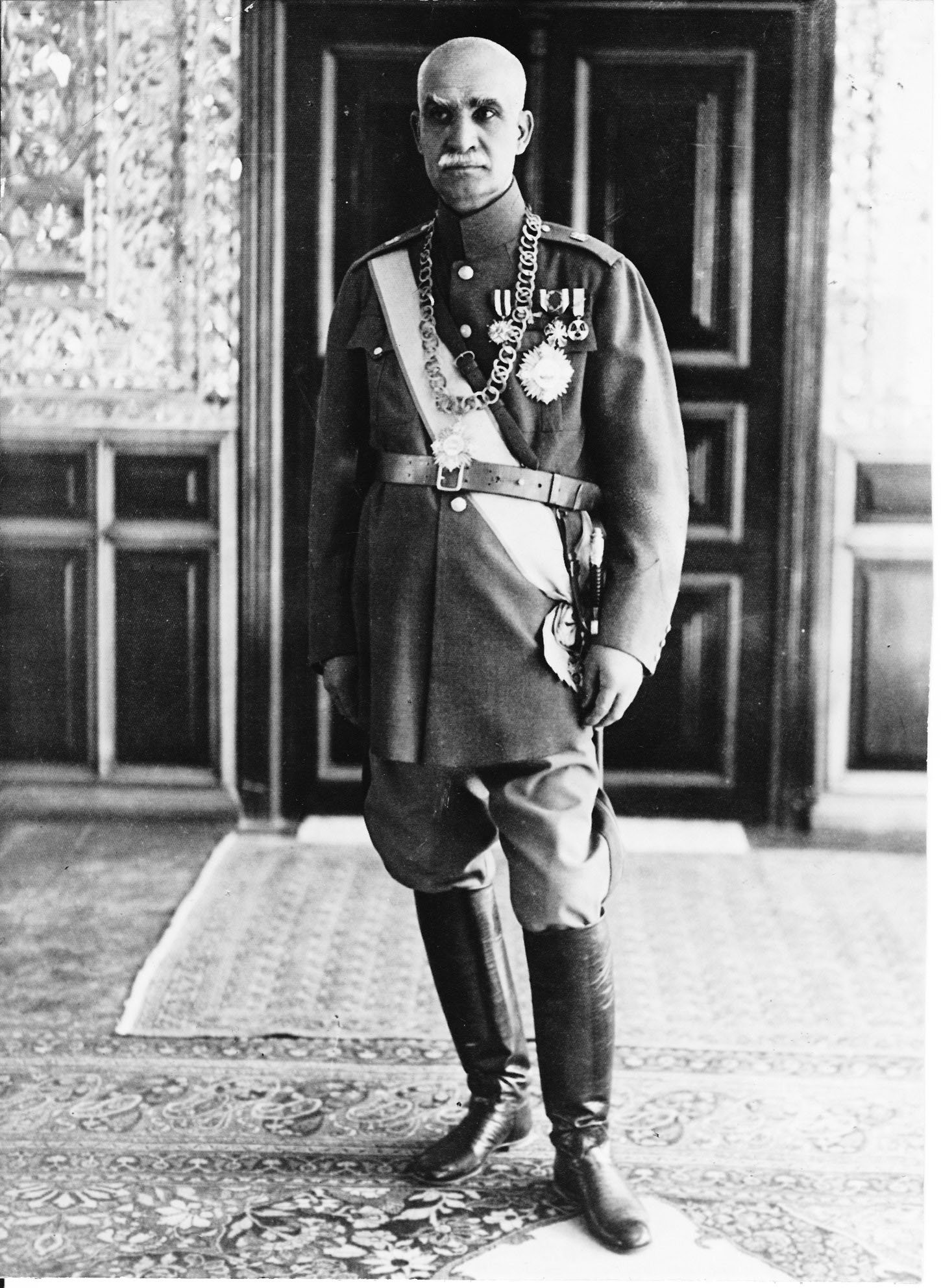
Reza Shah in his office (Green Palace) at Saadabad Palace complex, 1941

The Shah's reign is sometimes divided into periods. All the efforts of Reza Shah's reign were either completed or conceived in the 1925–1938 period. Abdolhossein Teymourtash assisted by Farman Farma, Ali-Akbar Davar and a large number of modern educated Iranians, proved adept at masterminding the implementation of many reforms demanded since the failed constitutional revolution of 1905–1911. The preservation and promotion of the country's historic heritage, the provision of public education, construction of a national railway, abolition of capitulation agreements, and the establishment of a national bank had all been advocated by intellectuals since the tumult of the constitutional revolution. The later years of his reign were dedicated to institutionalizing the educational system of Iran and also to the industrialization of the country. He knew that the system of the constitutional monarchy in Iran after him had to stand on a solid basis of the collective participation of all Iranians, and that it was indispensable to create educational centers all over Iran. Reza Shah attempted to forge a regional alliance with Iran's Middle Eastern neighbors, particularly Turkey. The death of Ataturk in 1938, followed by the start of World War II shortly thereafter, prevented these projects from being realized.

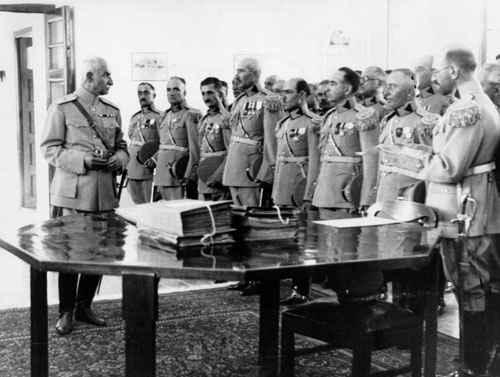
Reza Shah meeting officials in Saadabad Palace, 1940

The parliament assented to his decrees, the free press was suppressed, and the swift incarceration of political leaders like Mossadegh, the murder of others such as Teymourtash, Sardar Asad, Firouz, Modarres, Arbab Keikhosro and the suicide of Davar, ensured that any progress towards democratization was stillborn and organized opposition to the Shah, impossible. Reza Shah treated the urban middle class, the managers, and technocrats with an iron fist; as a result his state-owned industries remained underproductive and inefficient. The bureaucracy fell apart, since officials preferred sycophancy, when anyone could be whisked away to prison for even the whiff of disobeying his whims. He confiscated land from the Qajars and from his rivals and into his own estates. The corruption continued under his rule and even became institutionalized. Progress toward modernization was spotty and isolated as it could only take place with Shah's approval. Eventually, the Shah became totally dependent on the military and secret police to retain power; in return, these state organs regularly received funding up to 50 percent of available public revenue to ensure their loyalty.

=== World War II and forced abdication ===
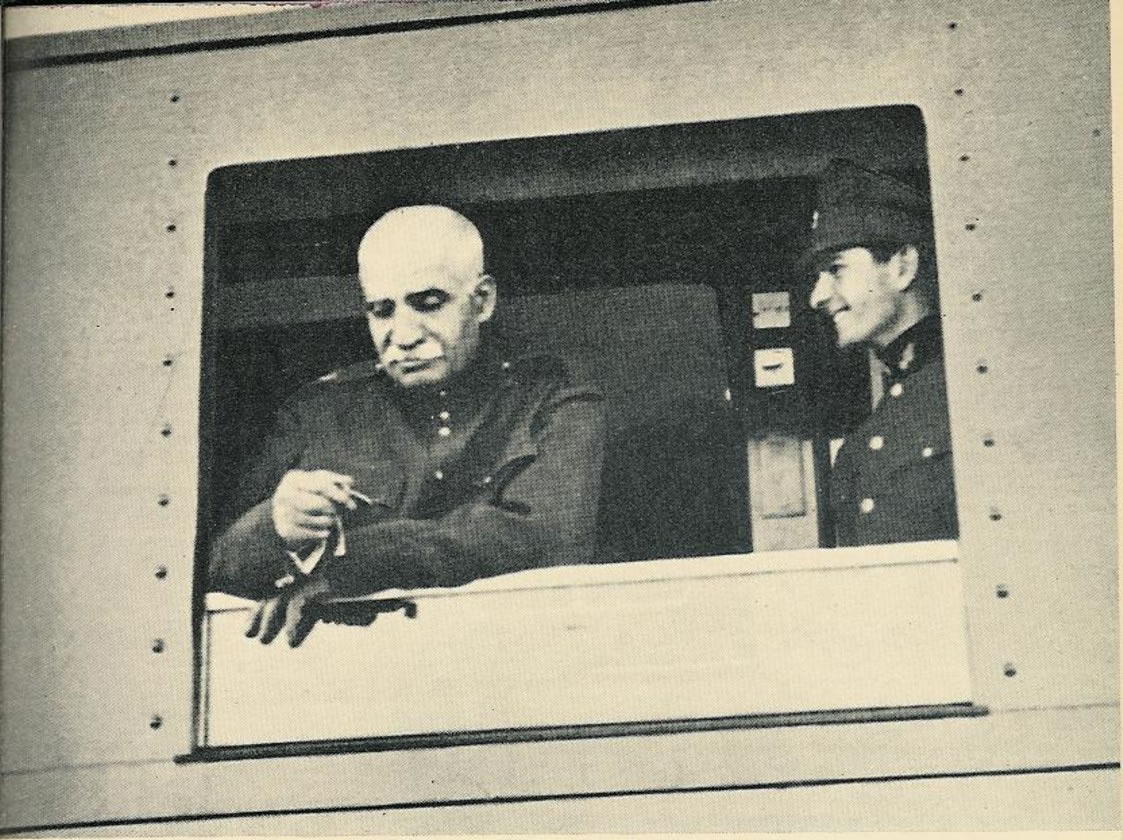
Reza Shah and Crown Prince Mohammad Reza in a train

In August 1941 the Allied powers (United Kingdom and the Soviet Union) invaded and occupied neutral Iran by a massive air, land, and naval assault without a declaration of war. By 28–29 August, the Iranian military situation was in complete chaos. The Allies had complete control over the skies of Iran, and large sections of the country were in their hands. Major Iranian cities (such as Tehran) were suffering repeated air raids. In Tehran itself, the casualties had been light, but the Soviet Air Force dropped leaflets over city, warning the population of an upcoming massive bombing raid and urging them to surrender before they suffered imminent destruction. Tehran's water and food supply had faced shortages, and soldiers fled in fear of the Soviets killing them upon capture. Faced with total collapse, the royal family (except the Shah and the Crown Prince) fled to Isfahan. The collapse of the army that Reza Shah had spent so much time and effort creating was humiliating. Many Iranian commanders behaved incompetently, others secretly sympathized with the British and sabotaged Iranian resistance. The army generals met in secret to discuss surrender options. When the Shah learned of the generals' actions, he beat armed forces chief General Ahmad Nakhjavan with a cane and physically stripped him of his rank. Nakhjavan was nearly shot by the Shah on the spot, but at the insistence of the Crown Prince, he was sent to prison instead.

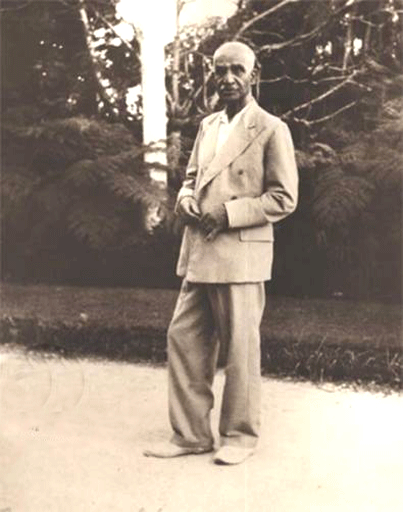
Reza Shah in exile

The Shah ordered pro-British Prime Minister Ali Mansur, whom he blamed for demoralising the military, to resign, replacing him with former prime minister Mohammad Ali Foroughi. Within days, Reza Shah ordered the military to cease resistance and entered into negotiations with the British and Soviets. Foroughi was disobliged towards Reza Shah, having been previously forced into retirement years earlier for political reasons with his daughter's father-in-law being executed by firing squad. When he entered into negotiations with the British, instead of negotiating a favorable settlement, Foroughi implied that both he and the Iranian people wanted to be "liberated" from the Shah's rule. The British and Foroughi agreed that for the Allies to withdraw, Iran would have to expel the German minister and his staff should leave Tehran; the German, Italian, Hungarian and Romanian legations would be closed; and all remaining German nationals (including all families) would be handed over to the British and Soviet authorities. The last order would mean almost certain imprisonment. Reza Shah stalled on the last demand, choosing instead to secretly evacuate German nationals from the country. By 18 September, most of the German nationals had escaped via the Turkish border.

In response to the Shah's defiance, the Red Army on 16 September moved to occupy Tehran. Fearing execution by the Communists, many people (especially the wealthy) fled the city. Reza Shah, in a letter handwritten by Foroughi, announced his abdication, as the Soviets entered the city on 17 September. The British wanted to restore the Qajar dynasty to power, but the heir to Ahmad Shah Qajar since that last Qajar Shah's death in 1930, Hamid Hassan Mirza, was a British subject who spoke no Persian. Instead (with the help of Foroughi), Crown Prince Mohammad Reza Pahlavi took the oath to become the Shah of Iran.

The British left the Shah a face-saving way out: "Would His Highness kindly abdicate in favor of his son, the heir to the throne? We have a high opinion of him and will ensure his position. But His Highness should not think there is any other solution." The Anglo-Soviet invasion was instigated in response to Reza for having denied the request to remove the German residents, who could threaten the Abadan refinery. Reza Shah further refused the Allies' requests to expel German nationals residing in Iran and denied the use of the railway to the Allies. According to the British embassy reports from Tehran in 1940, the total number of German citizens in Iran from technicians to spies was no more than one thousand. Because of its strategic importance to the Allies, Iran was subsequently called "The Bridge of Victory" by Winston Churchill. Reza Shah was forced by the invading British to abdicate in favor of his son Mohammad Reza Pahlavi who replaced his father as Shah on the throne on 16 September 1941.

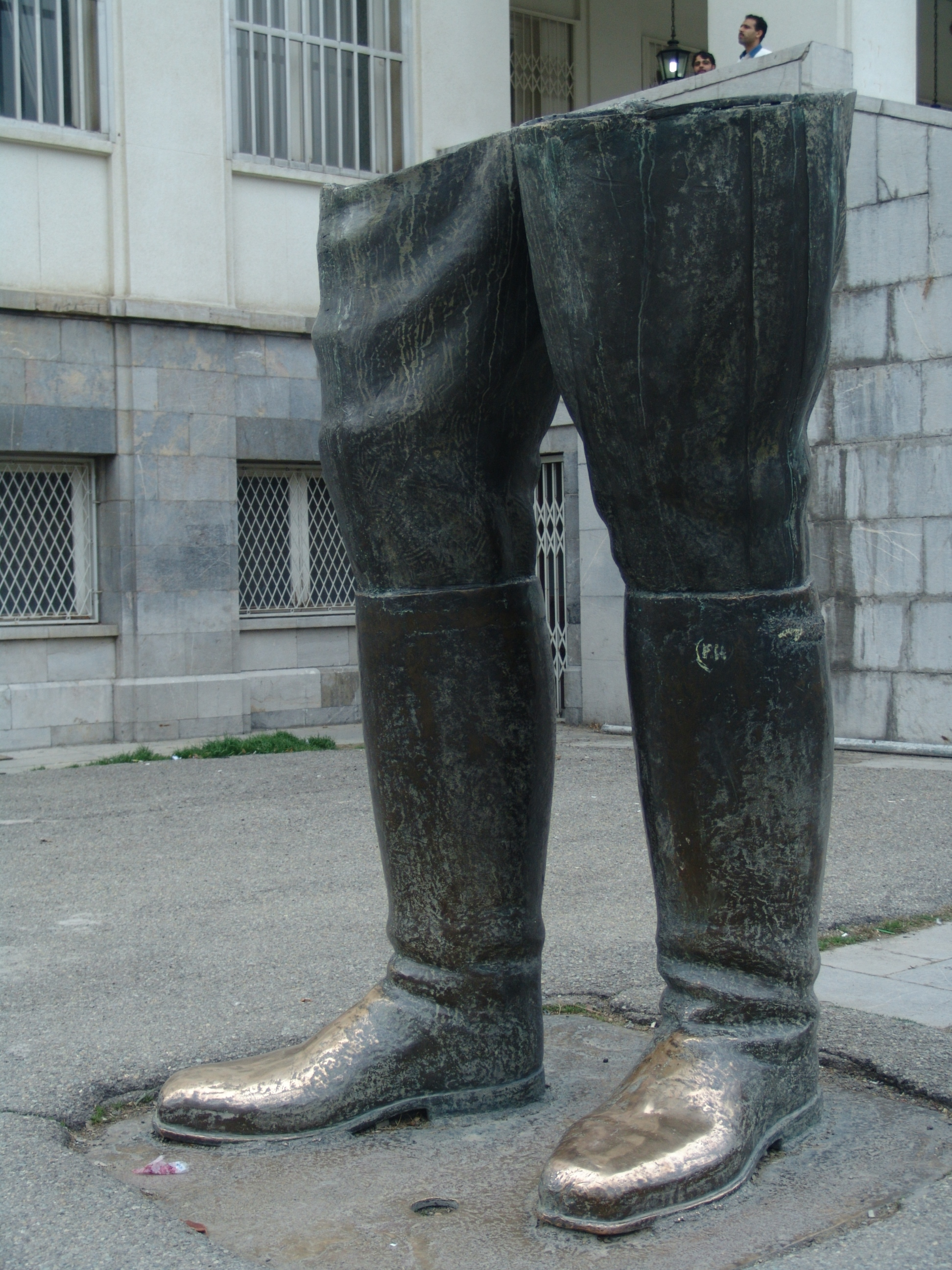
Reza Shah's legs statue after the original statue was destroyed after the 1979 Revolution

=== Critics and defenders ===
Reza Shah's main critics were the "new intelligentsia", often educated in Europe, for whom the Shah "was not a state-builder but an 'oriental despot' ... not a reformer but a plutocrat strengthening the landed upper class; not a real nationalist but a jack-booted Cossack trained by the Tsarists and brought to power by British imperialists." His defenders included Ahmad Kasravi, a contemporary intellectual and historian of constitutional movement, who had strongly criticized participation of Reza Shah in the 1909 siege of Tabriz. When he accepted the unpleasant responsibility of acting as defense attorney for a group of officers accused of torturing political prisoners, he stated: "Our young intellectuals cannot possibly understand and cannot judge the reign of Reza Shah. They cannot because they were too young to remember the chaotic and desperate conditions out of which arose the autocrat named Reza Shah."

Clarmont Skrine, a British civil servant who accompanied Reza Shah on his 1941 journey to British Mauritius, writes in his book World War in Iran: "Reza Shah Pahlavi, posthumously entitled 'The Great' in the annals of his country was indeed, if not the greatest, at any rate one of the strongest and ablest men Iran has produced in all the two and a half millennia of her history."

== Final years ==
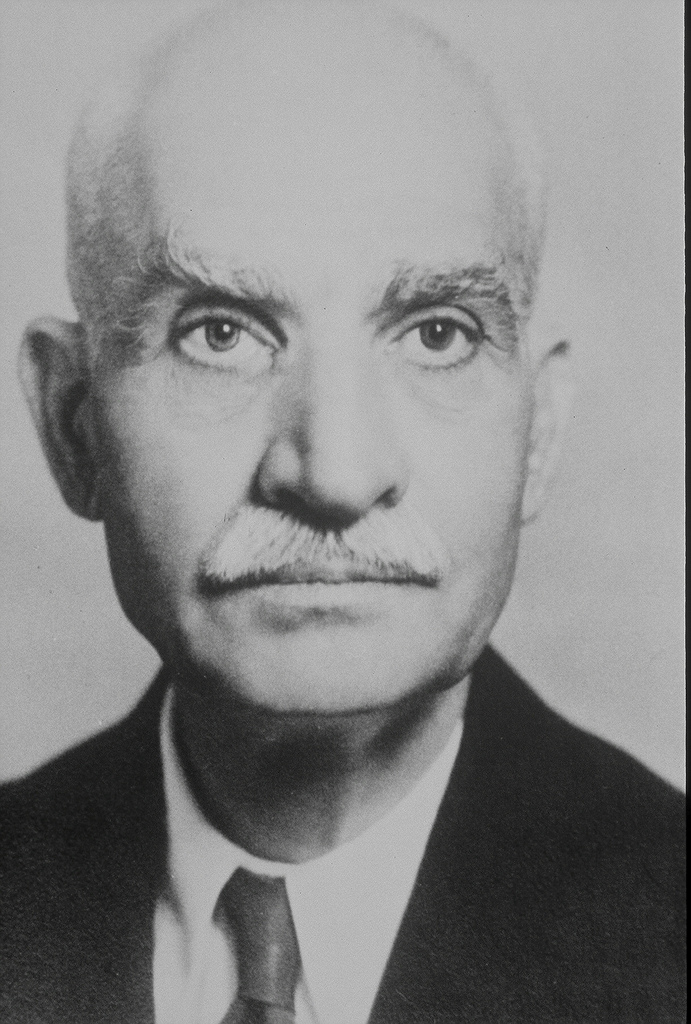
Reza Shah Pahlavi after abdication in South Africa in 1942

=== Exile in Mauritius ===
After the United Kingdom and the Soviet Union invaded and occupied Iran on 25 August 1941, the British offered to keep his family in power if Reza Shah agreed to a life of exile. He was transported from Iran on SS Bandra, believing he would be able to choose his place of exile and intending to take up residence in Argentina. However, when the ship arrived in Bombay he was refused permission to disembark by the British authorities and was instead sent to the colony of Mauritius, which the British government had used for other pro-Axis exiles including Serbian nationalist Milan Stojadinović.

Reza Shah spent seven months in Mauritius, accompanied by 19 others including members of his family, staff and servants. The British governor Bede Clifford accommodated him at Valory, a historic three-storey villa in the Moka neighbourhood of the capital Port Louis. The governor's wife and her friends sewed an Iranian flag to be flown above the château. Other members of the royal household were provided with residences nearby. Reza Shah was given full freedom of movement while in Mauritius, but left Valory only on two occasions. He was not placed under guard but the Mauritian authorities supervised his activities and censored his correspondence.

Reza Shah intensely disliked Mauritius, particularly its climate, and was said to have been visibly despondent during his exile. He regularly complained to the British authorities and regarded himself as a prisoner, comparing himself to Napoleon in St. Helena. As of 2023 the decrepit château was still an Iranian property, which the Iranian government has refused to sell.

=== Death ===
Following the signing of the Tripartite Treaty Alliance in early 1942, the Canadian government agreed to accept Reza Shah and his family. While awaiting transport to Canada, he was sent to Durban, South Africa, and then to a house at 41 Young Avenue in the Parktown neighborhood of Johannesburg. He died at the age of sixty-six on 26 July 1944 of a heart ailment about which he had been complaining for many years. His personal doctor had boosted the King's morale in exile by telling him that he was suffering from chronic indigestion and not heart ailment. He lived on a diet of plain rice and boiled chicken in the last years of his life.

After his death, his body was carried to Egypt, where it was embalmed and kept at the royal Al-Rifa'i Mosque in Cairo (also the future burial place of his son, the exiled Mohammad Reza Pahlavi). In May 1950, the remains were flown back to Iran where the embalming was removed, and buried in a mausoleum built in his honor in the town of Ray, in the southern suburbs of the capital, Tehran.

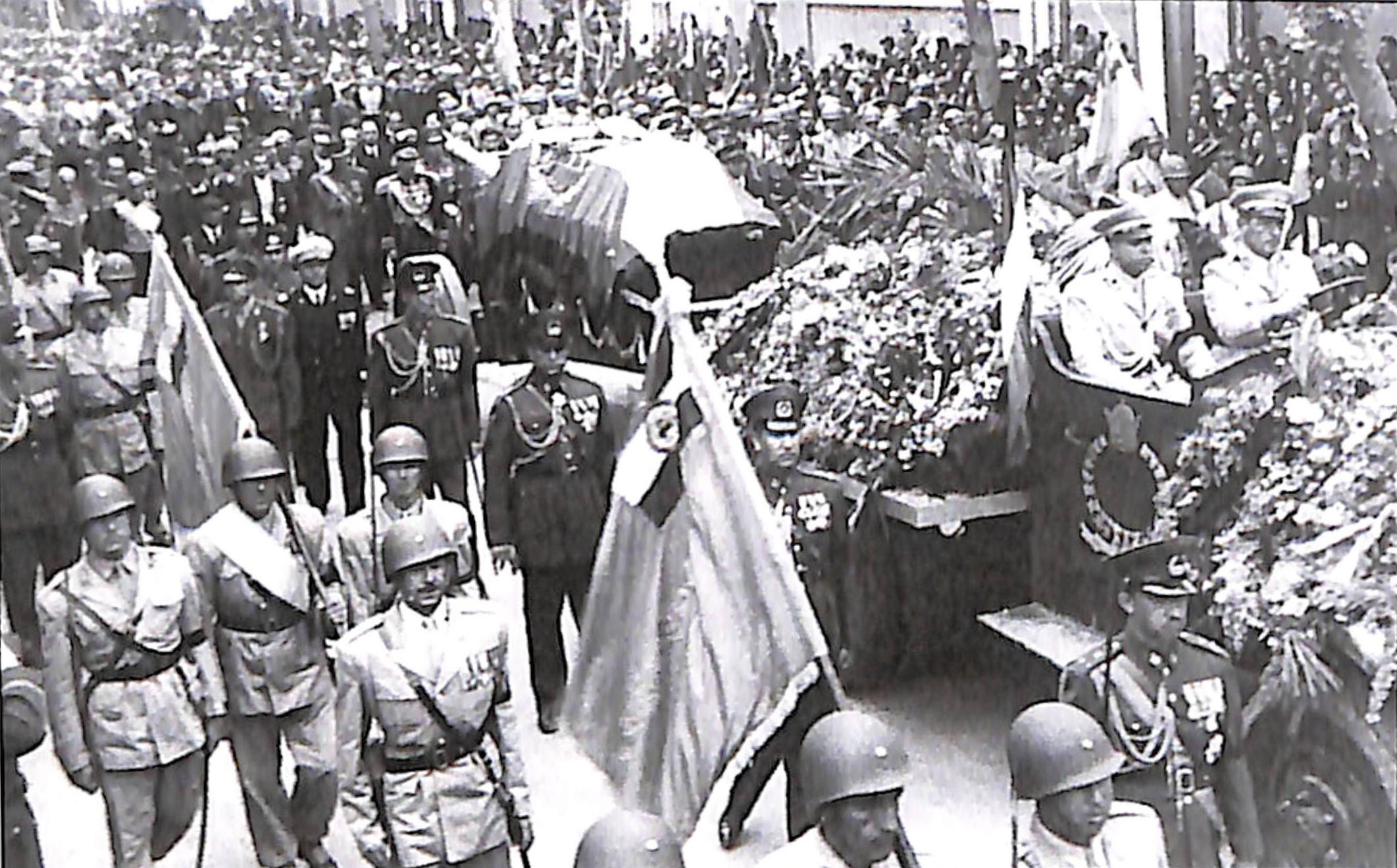
Reza Shah's funeral in Tehran

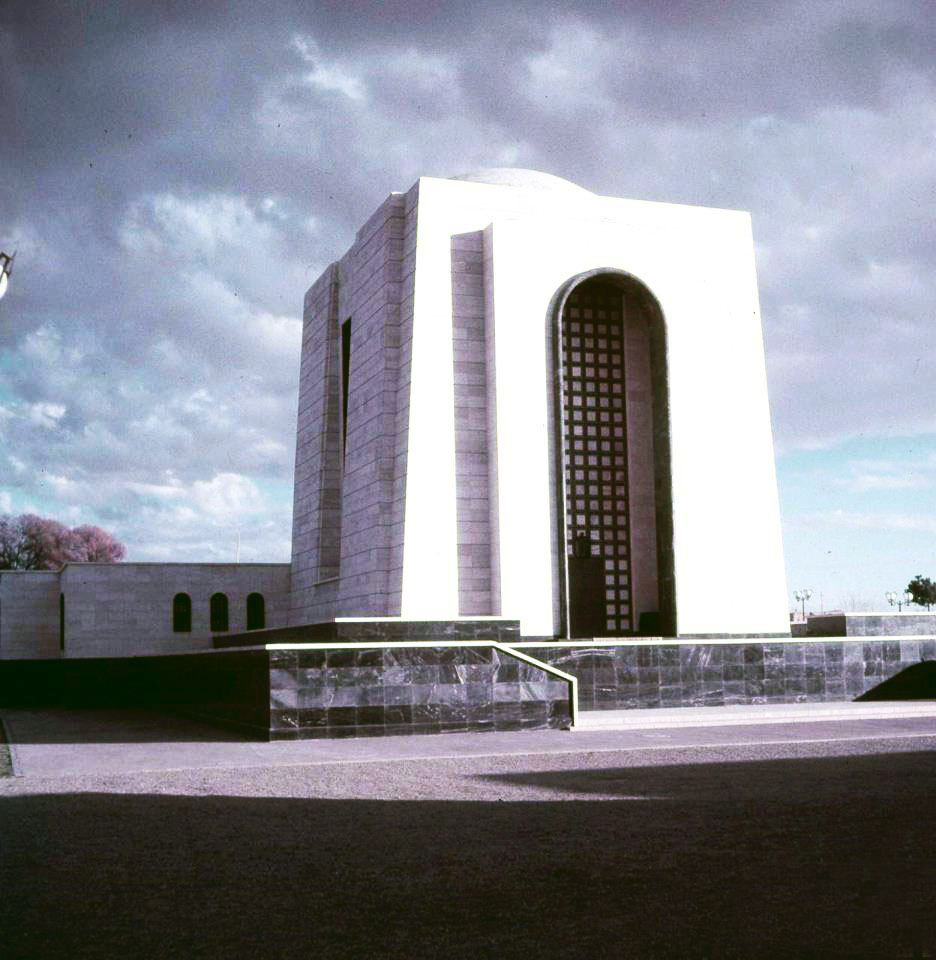
Mausoleum of Reza Shah in Ray, Tehran, Iran

The Iranian parliament (Majlis) later designated the title "the Great" to be added to his name. There were reports that on 14 January 1979, shortly before the Iranian Revolution, the remains were moved back to Egypt and buried in the Al-Rifa'i Mosque in Cairo. In a 2015 documentary From Tehran to Cairo, his daughter-in-law, Empress Farah, claimed that the remains of the late Reza Shah remain in the town of Ray. After the 1979 revolution and during the period of the Interim Government of Iran, Iran faced a series of rampages at the hand of an extremist mob led by the cleric Sadeq Khalkhali. During this rampage, happening all over the nation, any construction depicting or even citing the name of the Shah and his family was destroyed. This included the destruction of Reza Shah's mausoleum but were unable to find his dead body. In 2018, a mummified body believed to be Reza Shah's was found in the vicinity of his former mausoleum site in Tehran. An official said that the body belonged to Reza Shah and was buried in the same area.

== Accomplishments ==
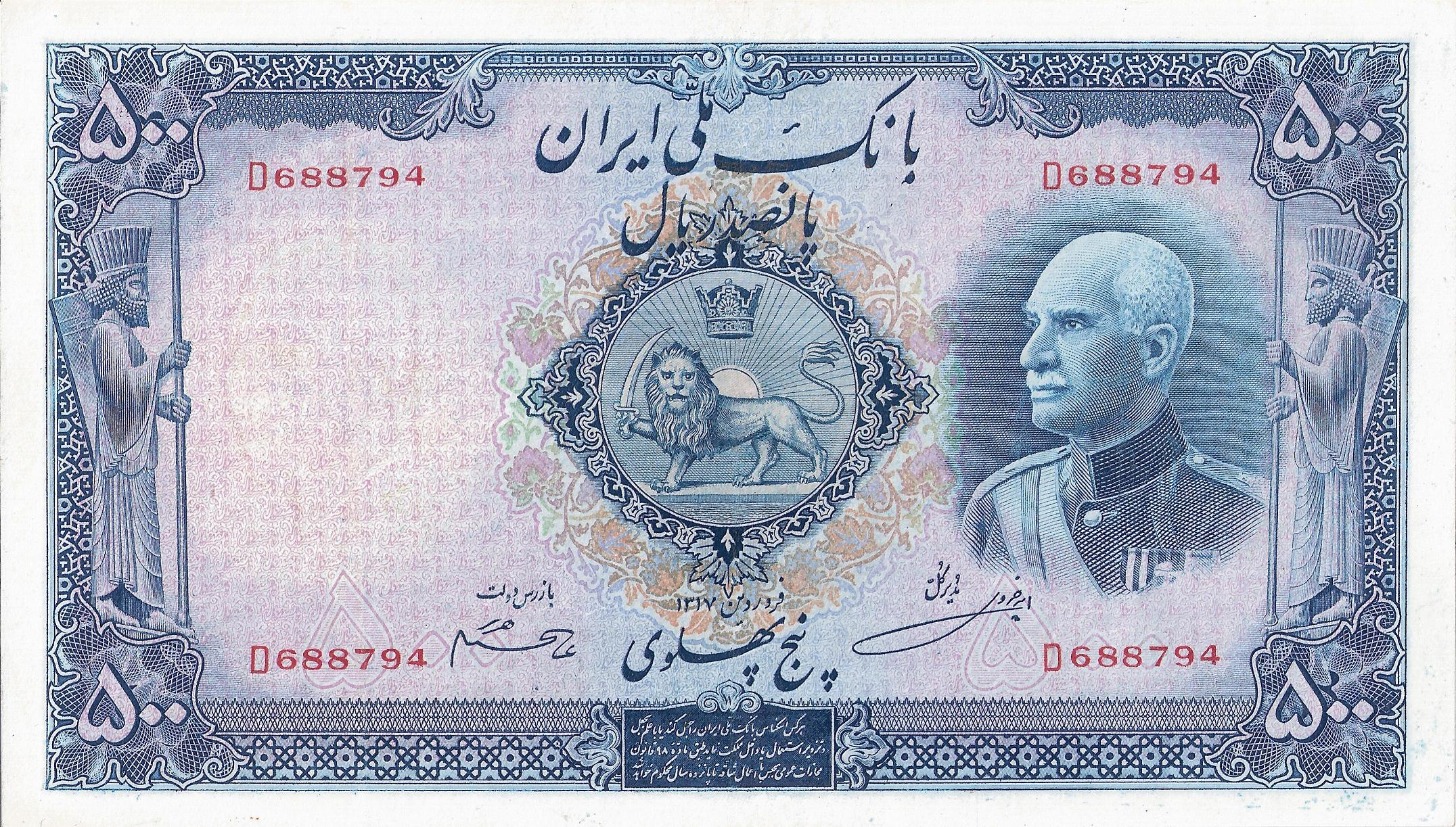
500 Rials Iranian banknote depicting Reza Shah

Under Reza Shah's reign, a number of new concepts were introduced between 1923 and 1941. Some of these significant changes, achievements, concepts, and laws included:

- Successful suppression of separatist movements and reunification of Iran under a powerful central government.
- Foundation of the first judicial system of Iran.
- Foundation of the first national health care system and public hospitals across the country.
- Reestablishment of Iranian Gendarmerie and Shahrbani in order to enforce law and order.
- Foundation of Trans-Iranian Railway which connected Caspian Sea to Persian Gulf.
- Nationalizing Iranian forests and jungles.
- Creation of an Iranian modern military.
- Creation of Iran's first radio stations.
- Founding of the national Museum of Iran.
- Rebuilding Iran's historical sites, including the tombs of Ferdowsi and Hafez.
- Organizing the Ferdowsi Millenary Celebrations to commemorate the thousandth anniversary of Ferdowsi's birth as the savior of Persian language and Iranian identity.
- Creation of Iran's Academy of Persian Language and Literature in order to protect Iran's official language.
- The first scientific excavations at Persepolis, the ancient capital of the Achaemenid Empire, were carried out by the initiative of Reza Shah. Ernst Herzfeld and Erich Schmidt representing the Oriental Institute of the University of Chicago conducted excavations for eight seasons, beginning in 1930, and included other nearby sites.
- Creation of Iran's first national bank known as Bank Melli Iran (with German advice) and other Iranian banks such as Bank Sepah and Keshavarzi Bank.
- Creation of the first university in Iran which is known as University of Tehran.
- Transferring and providing full scholarships for the Iranian students to European countries for studying abroad.
- Ordering all educational institutions in Iran to admit women.
- Eradication of corruption of civil servants, paying wages on time so people did not have to rely on bribes.
- Creation of the first national school system and schoolbooks in Iran; before Reza Shah Pahlavi, the Islamic madreseh and Quran was the only form of schooling available.
- Establishment of the first Iranian kindergarten and school for deaf people.
- Creation of the Iran Scout Organization.
- Creation of birth certificates and identification cards for all Iranians.
- Creation of the first Iranian airplane factory by purchasing a license from Junkers.
- Building the first Iranian airport known as Mehrabad airport.
- Changing Iranian currency from Toman to Rial.
- Restoring the Persian calendar and making it the official calendar of Iran.
- Ordering all men other than ulama to wear Western clothes.
- Kashf-e hijab (Unveiling). On 8 January 1936, Reza Shah issued a decree banning all veils (headscarf and chador), an edict that was swiftly and forcefully implemented. The government also banned many types of male traditional clothing.
- In the Western world, Persia (or one of its cognates) was historically the common name for Iran. In 1935, Reza Shah asked foreign delegates to use the term Iran, the historical name of the country, used by its native people, in formal correspondence.
- Reconstruction of old cities.
- Abolition of slavery.
- Abolition of the harem.

== Family and personal life ==
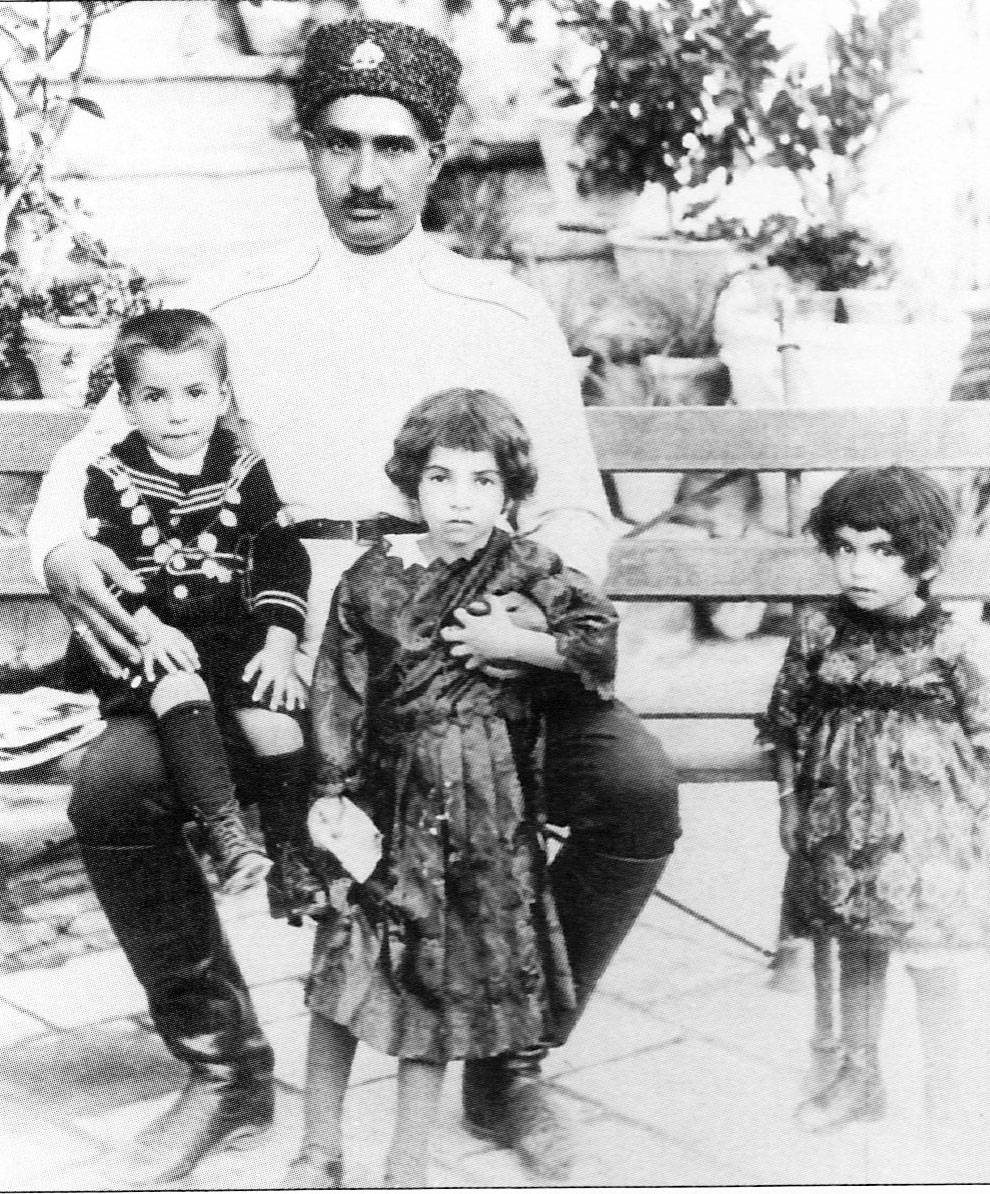
Reza Shah and his children (from left to right: Mohammad Reza, Shams, and Ashraf), 1920s

Reza Shah married, for the first time, Maryam Savadkoohi, who was his cousin, in 1895. The marriage lasted until Maryam's death in 1911. the couple had a daughter:

- Princess Hamdam al-Saltaneh Pahlavi (1903–1992)

Reza Shah's second wife was Nimtaj Ayromlou, later Tadj ol-Molouk (1896–1982). The couple married in 1916 and when Reza Khan became king, Queen Tadj ol-Molouk was his official wife. They had four children together:

- Princess Shams Pahlavi (1917–1996)
- Mohammad Reza Shah Pahlavi (1919–1980)
- Princess Ashraf Pahlavi (1919–2016)
- Prince Ali Reza Pahlavi (1922–1954).

The third wife of Reza Shah was Turan Amirsoleimani (1905–1994), who was from the Qajar dynasty. The couple married in 1922 but divorced in 1923 and together they had a son:

- Prince Gholam Reza Pahlavi (1923–2017)

Reza Shah's fourth and last wife, Esmat Dowlatshahi (1905–1995), was a member of the Qajar dynasty. She married Reza Shah in 1923 and accompanied him to his exile. Esmat was Reza Shah's favorite wife, who resided at Marble Palace. The couple had five children:

- Prince Abdul Reza Pahlavi (1924–2004)
- Prince Ahmad Reza Pahlavi (1925–1981)
- Prince Mahmoud Reza Pahlavi (1926–2001)
- Princess Fatemeh Pahlavi (1928–1987)
- Prince Hamid Reza Pahlavi (1932–1992).

== List of prime ministers ==
- Mohammad Ali Foroughi (first term, 1 November 1925 – 13 June 1926), was a close colleague and friend of Reza Shah before he became king who was probably also Reza Shah's favorite prime minister
- Mostowfi ol-Mamalek (sixth term, 13 June 1926 – 2 June 1927)
- Mehdi Qoli Hedayat (2 June 1927 – 18 September 1933)
- Mohammad Ali Foroughi (second term, 18 September 1933 – 3 December 1935)
- Mahmoud Djam (3 December 1935 – 26 October 1939), Mahmoud Jam's son Fereydoun Jam marries Reza Shah's daughter, Princess Shams. 1937
- Ahmad Matin-Daftari (26 October 1939 – 26 June 1940). Reza Shah removed him from office and imprisoned him in 1940 for spying on the UK and Winston Churchill on behalf of Adolf Hitler and Nazi Germany.
- Ali Mansur (26 June 1940 – 27 August 1941)

== Titles, styles, and honours ==
Following the overthrow of the Qajar dynasty and becoming the Shahanshah of Iran, he commanded all offices of Iran to address him with his surname and title, "Reza Shah Pahlavi". In the spring of 1950, after the foundation of the National Consultative Assembly, he was given the title "Reza Shah the Great".

=== Honours ===
- Czechoslovakia:
  - Czechoslovakia: Collar 1st Class of the Order of the White Lion, 1935.
- Denmark:
  - Denmark: Knight of the Order of the Elephant, 20 January 1937.
- Sweden:
  - Sweden: Knight of the Royal Order of the Seraphim, 10 November 1934.

== Notes ==
Reza Shah House of Pahlavi Born: 15 March 1878 Died: 26 July 1944
Regnal titles
Preceded by Ahmad Shah Qajar	Shah of Iran; 15 December 1925 – 16 September 1941	Succeeded by Mohammad Reza Pahlavi
Political offices
Preceded by Hassan Pirnia	Prime Minister of Iran; 28 October 1923 – 1 November 1925	Succeeded by Mohammad-Ali Foroughi
Preceded by Masoud Kayhan	Minister of War; 24 April 1921 – 13 June 1926	Succeeded by Abdollah Amir-Tahmasebi
Military offices
Preceded by Ahmad Shah Qajar	Commander-in-Chief of the Iranian Armed Forces; 14 February 1925 – 16 September 1941	Succeeded by Mohammad Reza Pahlavi
Preceded by Ghassem Khan Vali	Commander of the Persian Cossack Brigade; 14 January 1921–6 December 1921	Succeeded by Office Abolished
Non-profit organization positions
Preceded by Mostowfi ol-Mamalek	Chairman of the Iranian Red Lion and Sun Society; 1931–1941	Succeeded by Mohammad Reza Pahlavi
