= Maku Khanate =

18th-20th century khanate

Maku Khanate خانات ماکو
- 1747–1923
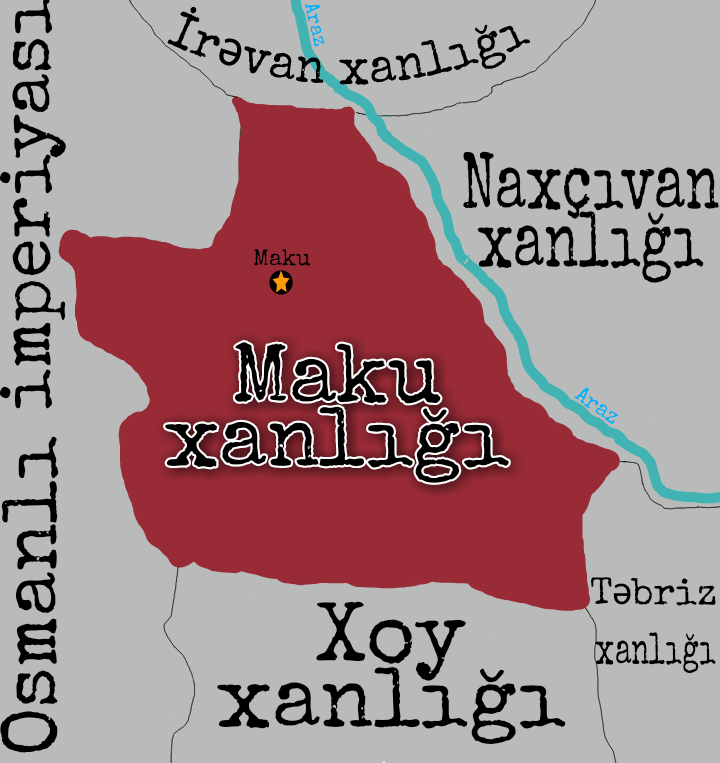
- Status: Khanate
- Capital: Maku
- Common languages: Persian (official), Azerbaijani (Majority), Kurdish & Armenian
- Ethnic groups: Azerbaijanis; Kurds; Armenians; Yazidis
- Religion: Shia Islam; Sunni Islam; Christianity; YarsanismYazidism
- History
  - Established: 1747
  - Independence from Afsharids: 1747
  - Disestablished: 1923
Preceded by	Succeeded by
Afsharid Iran	Qajar Iran

The Khanate of Maku (Persian: خانات ماکو, romanized: Khānāt-e Mākū) was an 18th–20th century khanate based in Maku, ruled by a family of Bayat origin.

== History ==
It came into existence after the death of Nader Shah in 1747. Ahmad Khan Bayat, according to oral tradition, served with Nader Shah in Khorasan. After Nader Shah's assassination, Ahmad Khan Bayat seized some of his treasure and returned to Maku. The Donbolis were the main powers in the region at this time, and it is probable that their dissolution opened the way for the Bayats to gain preeminence.

Very little is known about Ahmad Khan Bayat or his son, Hoseyn Khan Bayat. He was succeeded in 1835 by 'Ali Khan Bayat, who hosted The Bab in 1847 and benefited from Maku's strategic position and neutrality during the Russo-Turkish War. After 'Ali Khan Bayat died in 1865, he was succeeded by his son, Teymur Pasha Khan. Teymur Pasha Khan also benefited during the next Russo-Turkish War, and his cavalry helped crush the rebellion of Sheikh Ubaidullah. He was hailed as the savior of Azerbaijan and gained the nickname Mākū Pādshāhī (ماکو پادشاهی).

After he died in 1895, he was succeeded by his son, Mortezaqoli Eqbal al-Saltaneh Makui, also known as Eqbal al-Soltaneh. He initially continued the khanate's isolation, but this resulted in distrust from other powers. During the Persian Constitutional Revolution, he supported Mohammad 'Ali Shah and opposed the formation of anjomans in Maku. His nephew, Ezzat Allah Khan Salar Mokram led a revolt against his authority, setting up an anjoman, and forcing Eqbal al-Soltaneh to flee to the Caucasus. Eqbal al-Soltaneh returned, supporting royalist forces during the Siege of Tabriz. Eventually, Eqbal al-Soltaneh earned the ire of the Russians, who exiled him to Tiflis in 1914. During World War I, the Russians built a train station in Maku along the Shah Takhti - Bayezid route. In 1917, Eqbal al-Soltaneh returned to his position as khan of Maku.

After Reza Khan came to power, Mortezaqoli Eqbal al-Saltaneh Makui was accused of conspiracy and arrested on October 17, 1923. He died while in prison in Tabriz, and Captain Hasan Khan (commander of the troops of Khoi) took over administration of Maku, abolishing the khanate.

== Population ==
The Maku Khanate was very heterogenous in population. The main ethnic groups were Turks (in the majority) and Kurds. The Turks occupied the river valleys and were the remnants of older tribes, such as the Bayat and Pornäk. A group of Yarsanid Turks inhabited the foot of the Sokkar. They referred to themselves as the Qara Qoyunlu and their neighbors as Aq Qoyunlu.

The Kurds were semi-nomadic, and consisted of the Jalali (living near the Ararat and in Tambat), the Milan (living between the Aras River and the massif of Sokkar), and the Heydaranlu (located at Qarah 'Ayni). Maku also had small populations of Armenians (around 1,200 before the First World War), who constructed churches in the area like St. Thaddeus's Monastery and Surp-Stephanos. Lastly, there was a small Yezidi population that inhabited the village of Jabbarlu.

== The Khans of Maku ==
- Ahmad Khan Bayat احمد خان بیات (1747 - ?)
- Hoseyn Khan Bayat حسین خان بیات (? - 1835)
- Ali Khan Bayat علی خان بیات (1835 - 1865)
- Teymur Pasha Khan Bayat تیمور پاشا خان بیات (1865 - 1895)
- Mortezaqoli Eqbal al-Saltaneh Makui مرتضی قلی خان بیات "اقبال السلطنه (1895 - 1923)

== Sources ==
- Kia, Mehrdad (2023). The Clash of Empires and the Rise of Kurdish Proto-Nationalism, 1905–1926: Ismail Agha Simko and the Campaign for an Independent Kurdish State. Springer Nature. ISBN 978-3031449727.
- Minorsky, Vladimir (1991). "Mākū". In Bosworth, C. E.; van Donzel, E. & Pellat, Ch. (eds.). The Encyclopaedia of Islam, Second Edition. Volume VI: Mahk–Mid. Leiden: E. J. Brill. ISBN 978-90-04-08112-3.
- Rahnema, Ali (2023). The Political History of Modern Iran: Revolution, Reaction and Transformation, 1905 to the Present. Bloomsbury Publishing. ISBN 978-0755643998.
