= Pahlavi family tree =

Tree of the former Iranian dynasty

Khosrow Khan	Ramezan Khan Pahlevan
Jahanbakhsh Khan Pahlevan	Soleyman Khan Pahlevan
Molla Abbasali	Haji Mohammadhasan Khan
Cheraghali Khan Amir Akram	Fakhrollah Khan	Cheraqali Khan	First Wife	Moradali Soltan
Abolhasan Khan Samsam	Aqa Fazlollah
Khorshid Khanum	First Wife	Abbasali Khan	Second Wife
Duder Khanum
Nabat Khanum
Fourth Wife; Noushafrain Ayromlu
Amirreza Atabay	Husband; Hadi Atabay	Hamdamsaltaneh Pahlavi	First Wife; Maryam Savadkuhi	Reza Pahlavi; Shah 1925–1941
Cyrus Atabay
Simin Atabay
Temporary Marriage; Safie Hamedani
Mahnaz Zahedi	Ardeshir Zahedi	Shahnaz Pahlavi	First Wife; Fawzia bint Fuad	Mohammad Reza Pahlavi; Shah 1941–1979	Second Wife; Tadj ol-Molouk Ayromlu
Keykhosrow Jahanbani	Second Husband; Khosrow Jahanbani
Fuzie Jahanbani	Second Wife; Soraya Esfandiary-Bakhtiary
Noor Pahlavi	Wife; Yasmine Etemad-Amini	Reza Pahlavi II	Third Wife; Farah Diba; Queen Consort 1959–1967; Shahbanu 1967–1979
Iman Pahlavi
Farah Pahlavi
Farahnaz Pahlavi
Iryana Pahlavi	Partner; Raha Didevar	Ali-Reza Pahlavi
Leila Pahlavi
Shahram Pahlavinia	First Husband; Alimohammad Qavam	Ashraf Pahlavi
Nader Shafiq	Wife; Maryam Eqbal	Shahryar Shafiq	Second Husband; Ahmad Shafiq
Dara Shafiq
Kamran Vahid	Husband; Farshad Vahid	Azadeh Shafiq
Ashkan Vahid
Third Husband; Mahdi Bushehri
First Husband; Fereydoun Djam	Shams Pahlavi
Shahnaz Pahlbod	Second Husband; Mehrdad Pahlbod
Sharyar Pahlbod
Shahrazad Pahlbod
Ali Patrick Pahlavi	Wife; Christiane Cholewski	Ali Reza Pahlavi I
Mehrnaz Pahlavi	First Wife; Homa Alam	Gholamreza Pahlavi	Third Wife; Turan Amirsoleimani
Bahman Pahlavi
Azardokht Pahlavi	Second Wife; Manizhe Jahanbani
Maryam Pahlavi
Bahram Pahlavi
Kamyar Pahlavi	Wife; Parisima Zand	Abdul Reza Pahlavi	Fourth Wife; Esmat Dowlatshahi
Sarvenaz Pahlavi
Shahrokh Pahlavi	First Wife; Simin Tajbahrami	Ahmad Reza Pahlavi
Shahla Pahlavi
Shahin Pahlavi	Second Wife; Roza Bozorgnia
Sharnaz Pahlavi
Parinaz Pahlavi
First Wife; Mehrdokht Azam Zangane	Mahmoud Reza Pahlavi
Second Wife; Maryam Eqbal
Keyban Hillyer	First Husband; Vincent Lee Hillyer	Fatemeh Pahlavi
Daryush Hillyer
Rana Hillyer
Pari Khatami	Second Husband; Mohammad Amir Khatami
Kambiz Khatami
Ramin Khatami
Nilufar Pahlavi	First Wife; Minu Dolatshahi	Hamid Reza Pahlavi
Nazok Pahlavi	Second Wife; Homa Khameneh
Behzad Pahlavi
