= Khatami (surname) =

Khatami is an Iranian surname. Notable people with the surname include:

- Khatami family:
  - Ali Khatami (born 1953), Chief of Staff of President of Iran (2001–2005) and brother of Mohammad and Mohammad Reza Khatami
  - Mohammad Khatami (born 1943), Iranian reformist President, former President of Iran (1997–2005)
  - Mohammad-Reza Khatami (born 1959), Iranian reformist politician, vice speaker of Iranian Parliament (2001–2004) and brother of Mohammad Khatami
  - Ruhollah Khatami (1906–1988), father of Mohammad, Mohammad Reza, and Ali Khatami, and former Friday prayer Imam at the city of Yazd
- Sharif al-Ulama family:
  - Mohammad Amir Khatami (1920–1975), former commander of the Iranian air force
- Other:
  - Ahmad Khatami (born 1960), Iranian conservative cleric, one of the scribes of the Iranian Assembly of Experts who has no relationship with the former president, Mohammad Khatami
