= Abdul Reza Pahlavi =

Iranian royal (1924–2004)

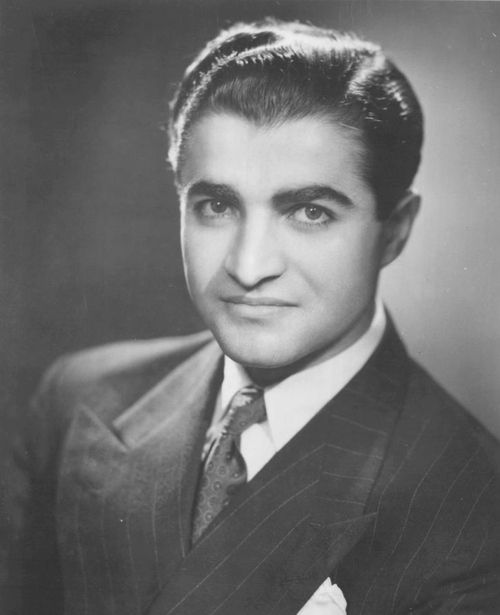
- Prince Abdulreza in 1949
- Born: 19 August 1924; Tehran, Sublime State of Iran
- Died: 11 May 2004 (aged 79); Florida, U.S.
- Spouse: Pari Sima Zand (m. 1950)
- Issue: Kamyar Pahlavi; Sarvenaz Pahlavi
- House: Pahlavi
- Father: Reza Shah
- Mother: Esmat Dowlatshahi
- Education: Harvard University

Abdul Reza Pahlavi (Persian: عبدالرضا پهلوی; 19 August 1924 – 11 May 2004) was a member of Iran's Pahlavi dynasty. He was a son of Reza Shah and a half-brother of Mohammad Reza Pahlavi.

== Early life and education ==
Abdul Reza Pahlavi was born on 19 August 1924 in Tehran. His parents were Reza Pahlavi and Princess Esmat Dowlatshahi, the daughter of Prince Mojalal-e Dowleh Dowlatshahi Qajar. She was a member of the Qajar dynasty and the fourth as well as last wife of Reza Pahlavi. They married in 1923. Abdul Reza had three brothers and a sister: Ahmad Reza, Mahmoud Reza, Fatemeh and Hamid Reza Pahlavi. They lived in the Marble palace in Tehran with their parents. During his father's exile he accompanied him in Mauritius and then in Johannesburg, South Africa, from 1941 to 1944. During this period there were rumors that the Allies had been planning to install Abdul Reza as king instead of his elder brother Mohammad Reza.

He studied business administration at Harvard University.

== Career and views ==
During the reign of his half-brother, Mohammad Reza Pahlavi, Abdul Reza headed different institutions. He was one of the prominent members of the royal court. On 3 September 1949 he was named honorary head of the supreme planning board of Iran's seven-year plan. Following the overthrow of the cabinet of Mohammad Mosaddegh in August 1953 there were proposals to depose the Shah Mohammad and to replace him with Abdul Reza in the post.

Abdul Reza was the head of the planning organization between 1954 and 1955. He served as the chairman of the Harvard-affiliated Iran centre for management studies from 1969 to 1979. He also headed the wildlife conservation high council and international council for game and wildlife conservation. He was also part of the Royal Council that ruled Iran during the international visits of Mohammad Reza Pahlavi. Following the assassination of a court minister by the Fada'iyan-e Islam in 1949, he suggested that the Shah should crush religious elements as did Reza Shah. He argued that this assassination could be used as a legitimate reason for the adoptation of their father's iron fist policy against them. He also believed that such a strategy is a must for the development of Iran. Prince Abdul Reza was one of the critics of the Shah in the late 1950s.

Abdul Reza also dealt with business, being wholly or partly the owner of factories, mining operations and agricultural firms. In addition, he dealt with environmental affairs during that time. He left Iran before the 1979 revolution together with other relatives.

== Hunting and wildlife conservation ==
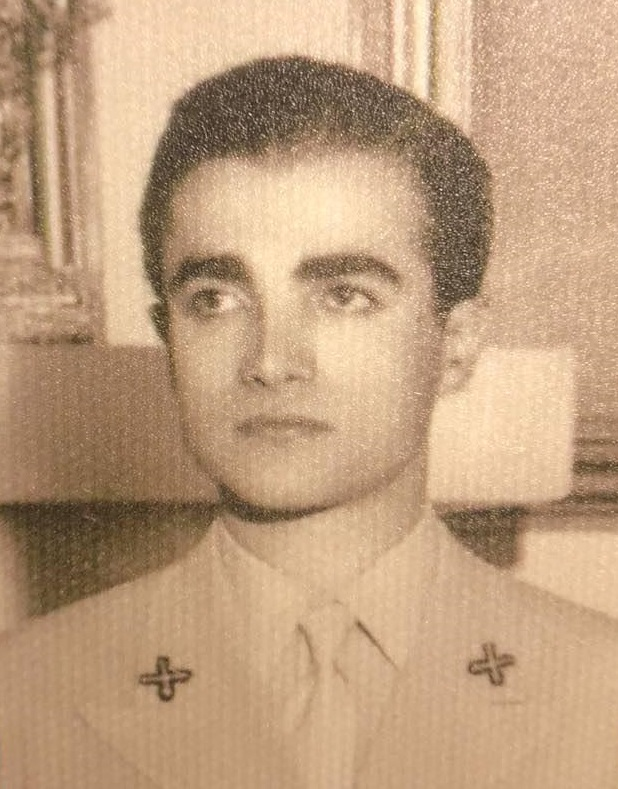
In his youth

Pahlavi was an enthusiastic hunter and sportsman throughout his life. He was the founder and president of the International Foundation for the Conservation of Game (IGF) in Paris, a group promoting wildlife conservation and responsible hunting in developing countries.

Pahlavi assisted in the creation of Iran's first game laws and game enforcement agency, and helped establish more than 20 million acres of reserves and parks in Iran. While criticized for promoting trophy hunting for himself and friends, Pahlavi aggressively pursued poachers while head of the Iranian Department of the Environment, establishing one of the most extensive and successful big-game management programs in the developing world. He was also responsible for enacting law protecting endangered species such as the gazelle, Caspian tiger, wild ass, cheetah, and the Persian fallow deer from extinction, imposing stiff fines for game law violators. In 1978, he approved the transfer of four Persian fallow deer from Iran to Israel before the fall of the Shah. According to a survey by an Iranian environmentalist, Hoshang Zeaee, overhunting and environmental destruction since 1978 has resulted in the extinction of several species once native to the Iranian plateau, including the jebeer gazelle (Gazella dorcas fuscifrons), Persian wild ass (Equus hermionus), Alborz red sheep (Ovis ammon orientaliss), Asian cheetah (Acinonyx jubatus), Persian fallow deer (Dama mesopotamica) and goitered gazelle (Gazella subgutturosia).

=== Awards for hunting ===
Pahlavi was the recipient of several awards for his hunting-related activities. He was awarded the Weatherby Award in 1962. In 1984 the Safari Club International honored him with the Hunting Hall of Fame and in 1988 he received the International Hunting Award.

== Personal life ==
Pahlavi married Pari Sima Pahlavi (née Zand, daughter of Ibrahim Zand, Governor-General of Azerbaijan and Minister for War) in Tehran on 12 October 1950. He had two children from this marriage: Kamyar (born 1952) and Sarvenaz Pahlavi (born 1955). His family resided in Florida, the US, and in Paris, France.

Before his marriage he had a relationship with actress Yvonne De Carlo, whom he met when he visited Beverly Hills in 1947. A week later, they traveled to New York and spent some time together. After the completion of her film Casbah, on De Carlo's first trip to Europe, he reunited with her in Paris. They vacationed in Switzerland and Italy, and, several months later, De Carlo also visited the royal palace in Tehran.

== Death ==
Abdul Reza Pahlavi died in Florida on 11 May 2004.

== Honours ==
In addition to national honours, i.e., Grand Cross of the Order of Pahlavi, Pahlavi is the recipient of several foreign honours, including:

- Knight Grand Cordon of the Supreme Order of the Renaissance (28 February 1949)
- Knight Grand Cross of the Order of Merit of the Italian Republic (15 December 1974)
- Knight Grand Cross of the Order of the Supreme Sun (First Class)
- Knight of the Royal Order of the Seraphim (24 November 1970)
- Knight Grand Cross of the Royal Order of Isabella the Catholic (9 February 1978)
