= Hamid Reza Pahlavi =

Iranian royal

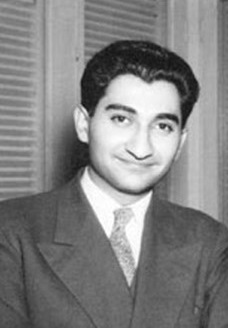
- Born: 4 July 1932; Tehran, Imperial State of Iran
- Died: 12 July 1992 (aged 60); Tehran, Iran
- Burial: Behesht-e Zahra
- Spouse: Minou Dowlatshahi (m. 1951, divorced) Homa Khameneh (m. 1959, divorced) Houri Khameneh (m. 1974)
- Issue: Niloufar Pahlavi; Behzad Pahlavi; Nazak Pahlavi; Ja'afar Pahlavi
- House: Pahlavi
- Father: Reza Shah
- Mother: Esmat Dowlatshahi

Hamid Reza Pahlavi (Persian: حمیدرضا پهلوی; 4 July 1932 – 12 July 1992) was Reza Shah's eleventh and last born child, and a half-brother of Mohammad Reza Pahlavi, the last shah of Iran.

== Early life and education ==
Hamid Reza Pahlavi was born on 4 July 1932. He was the youngest son of Reza Shah and his fourth and favourite wife, Esmat Dowlatshahi. His parents married in 1923. His mother was a member of the Qajar dynasty. Of both his parents he had four siblings: Abdul Reza Pahlavi, Ahmad Reza Pahlavi, Mahmoud Reza Pahlavi and Fatemeh Pahlavi. They lived in the Marble Palace in Tehran with their parents.

He studied in the United States and in Tehran. While attending high school in Washington, D.C., (the Honeywell Foundation) in September 1947, he skipped school to take a train to Hollywood, California, to visit his brother, Mahmoud, who was studying at UCLA. He stated that he did so because his high school did not have girl students and he was homesick. He had acted similarly three months previously, leaving his high school in Newport, Rhode Island, to travel to Paris and Provincetown.

== Personal life ==
Hamid Reza married three times and had four children. He first married Minou Dowlatshahi (daughter of Shahzada ‘Abdu’l Fath Mirza, of the Dowlatshahi family, Governor-General of Fars) in Tehran in March 1951. Of this marriage he had a daughter, born 1953. In 1959 he married Homa Khameneh, by whom he had two more children. In 1974 Hamid Reza married Houri Khameneh, by whom he had one child, born 1975.

One of his sons lived in the United Kingdom, but was brought by Shah Mohammad Reza to Iran and attended a military school in Tehran.

Due to his scandalous lifestyle, Hamid Reza's title of prince was removed and the Shah banned him from the court. In the 1960s he became known as a leading figure in opium trafficking business.

== Later years and death ==
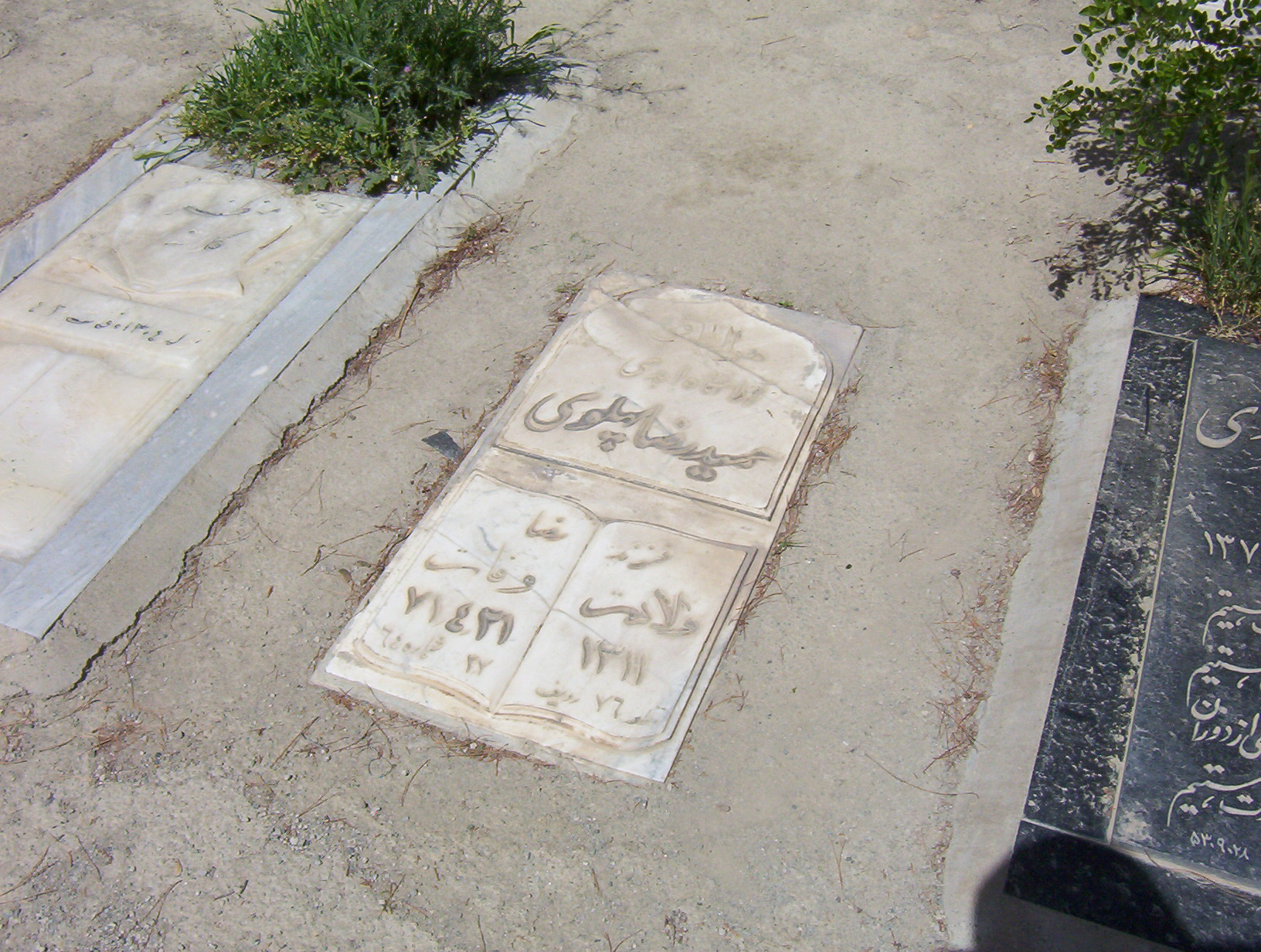
Pahlavi's grave in Behesht-e Zahra

After the Iranian Revolution that overthrew Shah Mohammad Reza Pahlavi, Hamid Reza stayed in Iran and changed his name to FaFar Islami. However, he was arrested as a vagrant in 1986. He received a sentence of ten years in Evin prison on drug charges. In an interview held in prison in 1989, Pahlavi however stated that he was sentenced for his family connections. He also said that he was not treated badly in prison and "things could be worse". Inmates in his prison cell included a former general and senior officials of the Shah's regime. In July 1992, while serving his sentence, he died of a heart attack.
