= Kiumars Saghafi =

Iran retired military commander

Timsar Kiumars Saghafi
- کیومرث ثقفی
- Military career
- Allegiance: Pahlavi Iran (?–1979); Iran (1979)
- Branch: Air Force
- Service years: ?–1979
- Rank: Brigadier General
- Commands: Iranian Air Force (1979)

Kiumars Saghafi (Persian: کیومرث ثقفی) was an Iranian military officer who held office as the acting commander of the Air Force for a short period of time in early 1979. In the wake of revolutionary retirements, he was appointed to the position by Mohammad-Vali Gharani on 12 February 1979, but resigned a few days later.

Military offices
Preceded by Amir Hossein Rabii as Commander of the Imperial Iranian Air Force	Commander of the Iranian Air Force; 11 February 1979–12 February 1979	Succeeded by Saeed Mehdiyoun
