= Fatemeh Pahlavi =

Iranian princess (1928–1987)

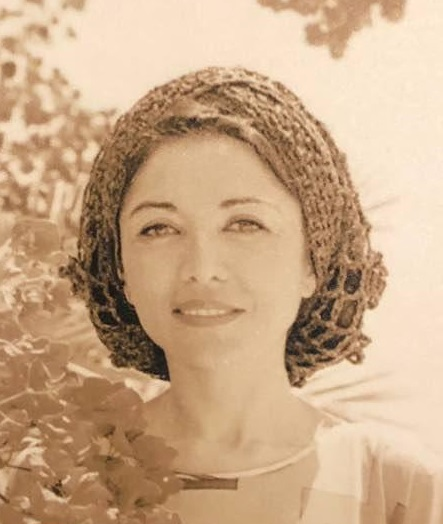
- Princess Fatemeh, circa 1950
- Born: 30 October 1928; Tehran, Imperial State of Iran
- Died: 27 May 1987 (aged 58); London, England
- Spouse: Vincent Lee Hillyer (m. 1950; div. 1959) Mohammad Amir Khatami (m. 1959; died 1975)
- Issue: List: Kayvan Hillyer Rana Hillyer Dariush Hillyer Kambiz Khatami Pari Khatami Ramin Khatami
- House: Pahlavi
- Father: Reza Shah
- Mother: Esmat Dowlatshahi

Fatemeh Pahlavi (Persian: فاطمه پهلوی; 30 October 1928 – 27 May 1987) was an Iranian princess of the Pahlavi dynasty. She was the tenth child of Reza Shah, and the half-sister of Mohammad Reza Pahlavi. Born in Tehran, she left Iran prior to the 1979 Iranian Revolution. In 1987, Fatemeh died of cancer in London.

== Early life and education ==
Fatemeh Pahlavi was born in Tehran, Iran on 30 October 1928. She was the tenth child of Reza Shah, and the fourth of his fourth and last wife, Esmat Dowlatshahi. Her mother was from the Qajar dynasty and married Reza Shah in 1923. Fatemeh was the younger full-sister of Abdul Reza Pahlavi, Ahmad Reza Pahlavi and Mahmoud Reza Pahlavi, and the older full-sister of Hamid Reza Pahlavi.

Fatemeh attended Converse College (now Converse University) in Spartanburg, South Carolina. She attended the college with her lady-in-waiting, Kokab Moarefi, in the 1947–1948 school year, but did not return any following years or obtain her degree. However, Moarefi stayed behind and graduated from Converse in 1950. She and her brothers lived at the Marble Palace in Tehran with their parents.

== Activities ==
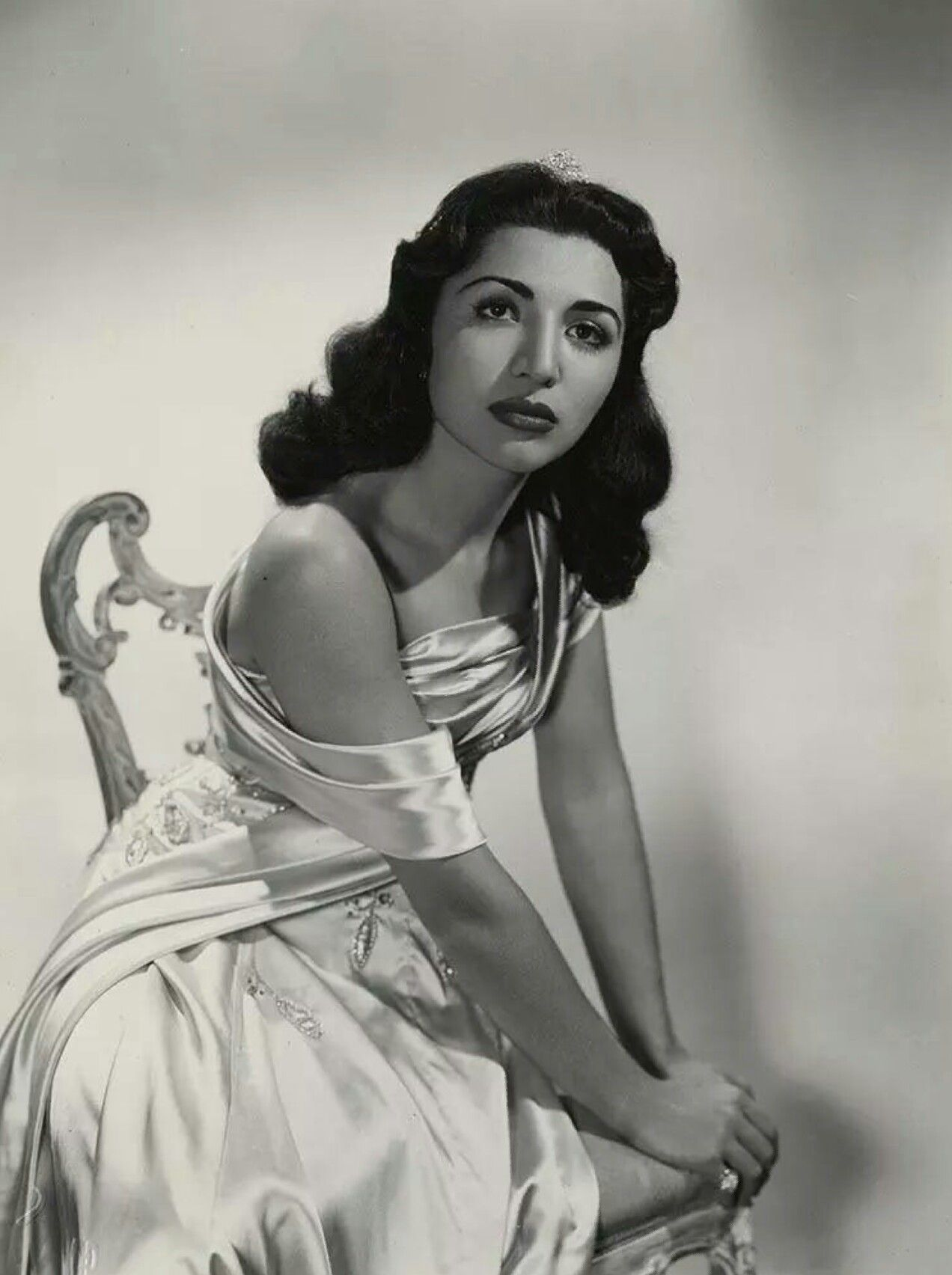
Princess Fatemeh in the 1950s

During the reign of her half-brother, Mohammad Reza Pahlavi, Fatemeh Pahlavi owned a bowling club and dealt with business, having shares in the firms involved in construction, vegetable oil production and engineering. She also had a fortune of some $500 million during that time. Her fortune came from the "commissions" extracted from military contractors by her second husband, commander of the Imperial Iranian Air Force Mohammad Amir Khatami. Pahlavi was also involved in activities concerning higher education in Iran and had shares in an Iranian football team, Persepolis F.C.

Fatemeh took courses from a British pilot to learn to fly a helicopter, becoming the first Iranian woman with a helicopter license. After she completed her first solo flight, she gifted her trainer with a watch, an Omega Speedmaster, which had been given to the Shah by the Apollo 11 astronauts in 1969 when they visited Iran as part of a tour to celebrate the first Moon landing. In early 2021 the watch was sold for £18,000 at auction.

== Personal life ==
Fatemeh Pahlavi married twice. She married American Vincent Lee Hillyer (1924 – 7 July 1999) in a civil ceremony in Civitavecchia, Italy, on 13 April 1950. Hillyer was a friend of her brother Abdul Reza Pahlavi. Fatemeh and Hillyer met in Iran during the latter's visit to the country. Hillyer converted from Roman Catholicism to Islam. On 10 May, they wed in a religious ceremony at Iran's embassy in Paris. The marriage was not fully endorsed by Shah Mohammad Reza, probably due to negative reactions in Iran. They had three children, two sons, Kayvan and Dariush, and one daughter, Rana, who died in an accidental fall in infancy in 1954. They divorced in September 1959.

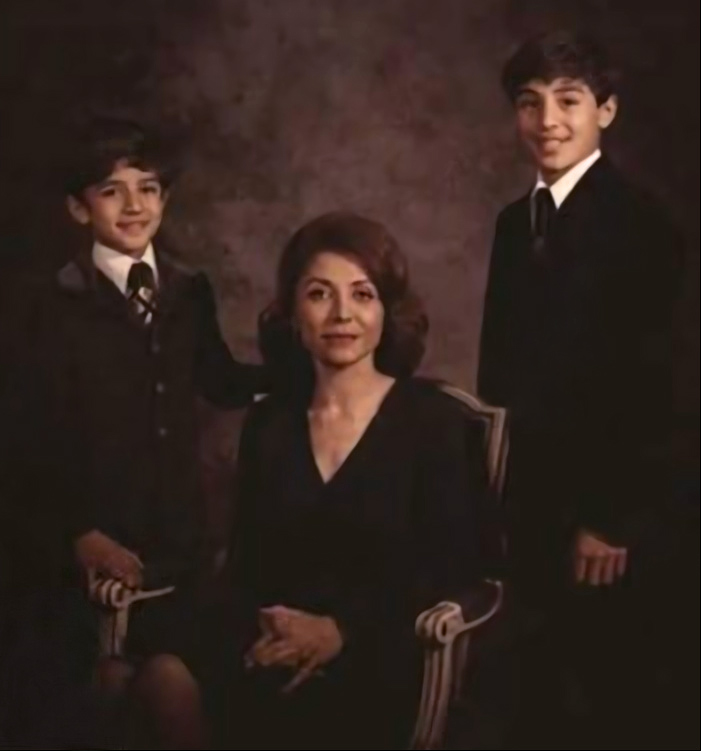
Princess Fatemeh with her sons Kambiz (right) and Ramtin (left), 1970s

After divorcing Hillyer, she married Mohammad Amir Khatami, the commanding general of Iran's air force, on 22 November 1959. The shah and his then fiancée Farah Diba attended the wedding ceremony. They had two sons, Kambiz (born 1961) and Ramin (born 1967), and a daughter, Pari (born 1962).

== Later years and death ==
Fatemeh left Iran before the Iranian Revolution in 1979. During her last years, she lived in London. She died at her London home on 27 May 1987 of cancer. She was 58 years old and was survived by her four sons.

== Honours ==
=== National ===
- Dame Grand Cordon Imperial Order of the Pleiades, 2nd Class

=== Foreign ===
- Grand Cross of the Order of Merit of the Federal Republic of Germany (21 October 1965).

== See also ==
- List of Iranian women royalty
