= Shapour Azarbarzin =

Iranian airforce general (1930–2015)

Timsar Shapour Azarbarzin
- شاپور آذربرزین
- Born: Abdollah Shapour Azarbarzin عبدالله شاپور آذربرزین; March 1930; Khorramabad, Pahlavi Iran
- Died: November 2015 (aged 85); Los Angeles, California, United States
- Military career
- Allegiance: Pahlavi Iran (1950s–1979); Iran (1979)
- Branch: Imperial Iranian Air Force (1950s–1979); Islamic Republic of Iran Air Force (1979)
- Service years: 1950s–1979
- Rank: Lieutenant General
- Commands: Iranian Air Force (1979); Deputy Commander of the Air Force (1977–1979); Deputy for Operations of the Air Force; 4th Tactical Air Base (Dezful)

Shapour Azarbarzin (Persian: شاپور آذربرزین; 1930–2015) was an Iranian fighter pilot.

The deputy commander to Amir Hossein Rabii before the Iranian Revolution, he was appointed as the commander of Air Force in 16 February 1979, and served in the capacity for 9 days. In April 1979, Prime Minister Mehdi Bazargan offered him to hold office as the defense minister, however he refused it. Shortly after, he was briefly imprisoned by the revolutionary forces but was released after efforts made by Bazargan and left Iran in late November 1980.

== Early life and career ==
Shapur Azarbarzin was born in 1929 into a military family in Khorramabad. He completed his advanced pilot and flight instructor training in the United States. During his military career, he held several senior positions, including:

- Commander of 4th Tactical Air Base (Dezful)
- Deputy for Operations of the Air Force
- Deputy Commander of the Air Force

After the revolution, he was appointed Commander of the Air Force for a brief period. He was later imprisoned but was released on the recommendation of Mehdi Bazargan, after which he left Iran.

In 1979, together with retired Lieutenant General Qasem Khazaei, he was appointed to the Supreme Council of Defense and National Security upon the recommendation of then-Minister of Defense Mostafa Chamran.

== Toufanian's opinion of Azarbarzin ==
According to a report by U.S. Ambassador William H. Sullivan dated 4 February 1979, General Hassan Toufanian believed that Azarbarzin had reached an understanding with Ayatollah Ruhollah Khomeini under which he would succeed Lieutenant General Amir Hossein Rabii as Commander of the Air Force.

In an interview for the Harvard University Iranian Oral History Project, Toufanian also stated that Azarbarzin had developed close ties with Ayatollah Mahmoud Taleghani and often echoed his views.

== Death ==
He died on November 2015 in the United States at the age of 85, after a long illness.

Military offices
Preceded by Saeed Mehdiyoun	Commander of the Iranian Air Force; 16 February 1979–25 February 1979	Succeeded by Asghar Imanian
