= Mohammad Amir Khatami =

Iranian airforce commander (1920–1975)

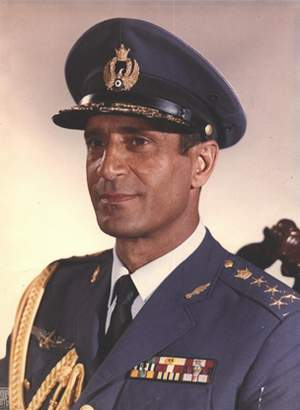
- General Kahatami, c. 1970s

Commander of the Imperial Iranian Air Force 7 October 1958 – 12 September 1975
- Monarch: Mohammad Reza Pahlavi
- Prime Minister: Manouchehr Eghbal; Jafar Sharif-Emami; Ali Amini; Asadollah Alam; Hassan Ali Mansur; Amir-Abbas Hoveyda
- Preceded by: Hedayatollah Gilanshah
- Succeeded by: Fazael Tadayon
- Born: 9 March 1920; Rasht, Qajar Iran
- Died: 12 September 1975 (aged 55); Dez Dam, Andimeshk, Pahlavi Iran
- Burial: Mausoleum of Reza Shah
- Spouse: Parvindokht Khadivi (m. 1945; died 1947) Princess Fatemeh Pahlavi (m. 1960)
- Issue: List: Sabrieh Khatami; Kambiz Khatami; Ramin Khatami; Pari Khatami
- House: Sharif al-Ulama family; Pahlavi dynasty (by marriage)

Military service
- Allegiance: Pahlavi Iran
- Branch/service: Imperial Iranian Air Force
- Years of service: 1939–1975
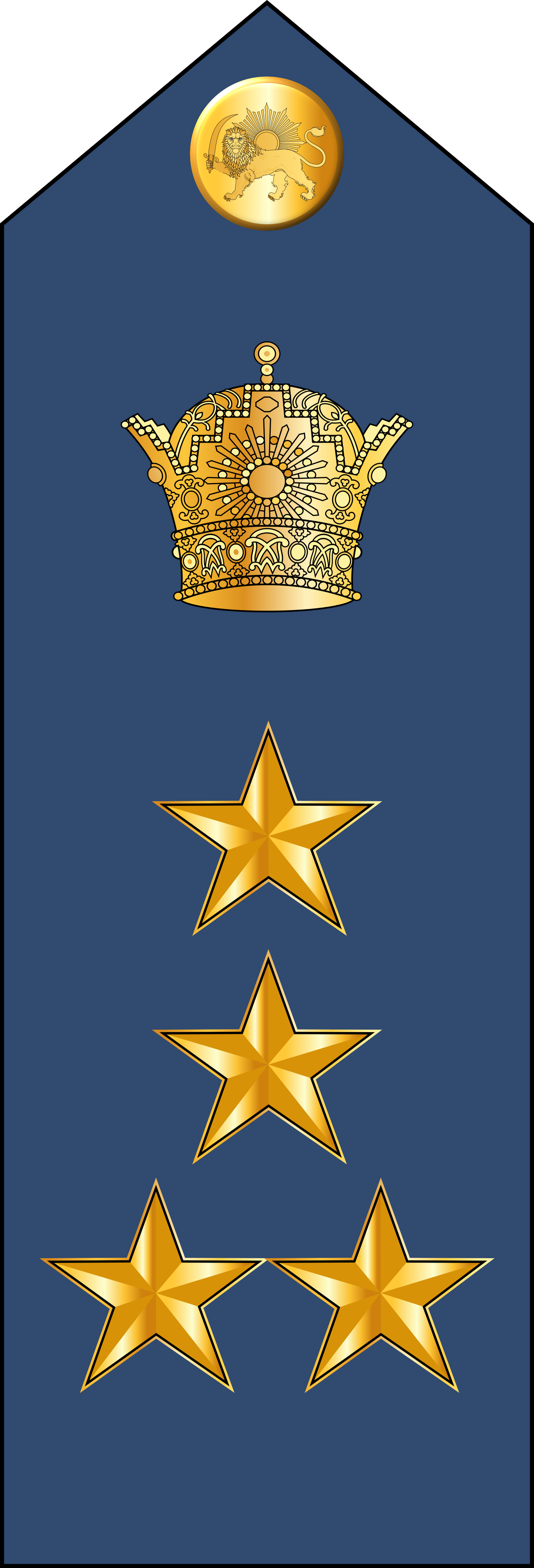
- Rank: General
- Battles/wars: 1962–1964 Tribal Rebellion of Fars; Joint Operation Arvand; Dhofar rebellion; Second Iraqi–Kurdish War; 1974–1975 Shatt al-Arab conflict

Mohammad Amir Khatami
Personal information
- Position: Midfielder

Senior career*
Years	Team	Apps	(Gls)
1946–1949	Sarbaz Tehran		
1949–1952	Tâj		

International career
1947–1950	Iran	4	(1)
- * Club domestic league appearances and goals

Mohammad Amir Khatami (Persian: محمدامیر خاتمی; 9 March 1920 – 12 September 1975), CVO, was the commander of the Imperial Iranian Air Force, advisor to Mohammad Reza Shah and the second husband of Fatemeh Pahlavi, half-sister of the Shah.

== Early life and education ==
Khatami was born in Rasht in 1920. His father was a tea house owner and later dealt with real estate. His mother was a relative of Imam Jomeh, a significant religious figure in Tehran and a relative of Naser al-Din Shah Qajar.

After graduating from the Alborz High School in Tehran, Khatami attended the military high school. In 1939, he began to study at the air force branch of the military college and graduated as a second lieutenant. Next, he took pilot training courses in the United Kingdom and graduated from the Royal Air Force College Cranwell. He was also trained at Fürstenfeldbruck Air Base, Germany, in the 1950s on jets as part of a group of 15 IIAF pilots including Capt. (later Lt. General) Nader Jahanbani, Lt. (later Lt. General) Amir Hossein Rabii, Lt. (later Lt. General) Mohammad H. Mehrmand, and Lt. (later Major General) A. Minusepehr.

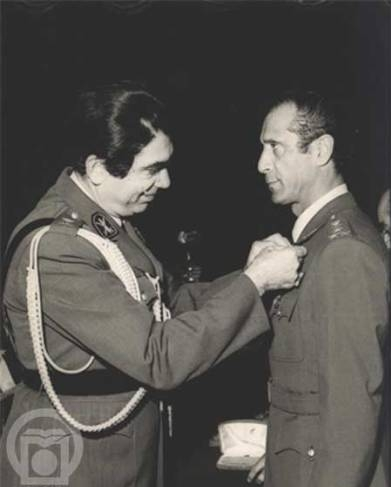
Shahpour Gholam Reza Pahlavi (left) and Mohammad Khatami

== Career ==
In 1946, Khatami was named personal pilot of the Shah. Days before the coup on 16 August 1953, the Shah, accompanied by his second wife Soraya Esfandiary-Bakhtiary and Aboul Fath Atabay, escaped from Iran to Iraq and then to Italy by a plane flown by Khatami. Khatami was also one of the military advisers of the Shah.

Later Khatami became a four-star general. In 1957, he was appointed commander of the Imperial Air Force. He succeeded Hedayatollah Gilanshah in the post. Khatami served in this post until his death in 1975. During Khatami's long tenure, the Imperial Iranian Air Force was modeled on the U.S. Air Force and became Iran’s main striking arm. Its transport and tactical airlift capabilities were significantly expanded between 1965 and 1968. Khatami's successor was Fazael Tadayon who was appointed to the post on 14 September 1975.

In addition, Khatami served as the chairman of the board of the Iranian National Airlines and chief of the council of the Civil Aviation Department. He also had some business activities. He was co-owner of a construction company and had shares in the aviation and real estate companies.

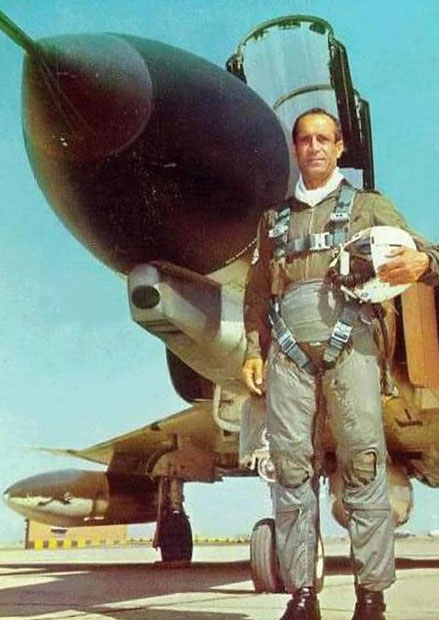
Khatami in Fighter pilot uniform

== Rank ==
Second Lieutenant	First Lieutenant	Captain	Major	Lieutenant Colonel
1939	1942	1944	1946	1951
19	22	24	26	31

Colonel	Brigadier General	Major General	Lieutenant General	General
1953	1957	1958	1962	1968
33	37	38	42	48

== Personal life ==
Khatami married twice. His first spouse was his cousin with whom he had a daughter. She was killed in an accident in 1954.

Thereafter on 22 November 1959, Khatami married Princess Fatemeh Pahlavi, the half-sister of the Shah. The Shah and his fiancée Farah Diba attended the wedding ceremony. They had two sons, Kambiz (born 1961) and Ramin (born 1967), and a daughter, Pari (born 1962).

In 1947 Khatami was the captain of the Iranian national football team. A declassified CIA report argues that Khatami was close to Hossein Fardoust and Taqi Alavikia, and that they were part of a dowreh, or social-political circle of associates. The dowreh, along with familial relations, was a significant element in the political functioning of Iran in the Pahlavi era. The Americans regarded Khatami as a pro-American official who might assume the role of successor to the Shah.

At the time of his death, Khatami's wealth was estimated to be nearly $100 million.

== Death ==
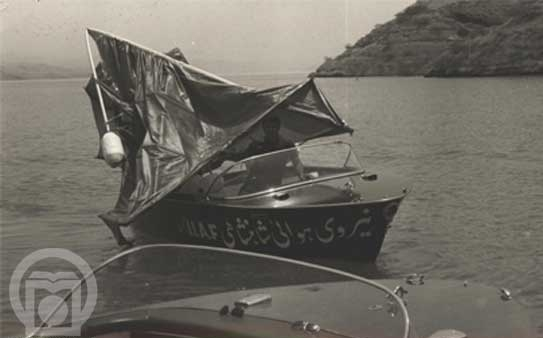
Khatami's kite

Khatami died in a hang gliding accident on 12 September 1975 in Dezful.
