= Mehrangiz Dowlatshahi =

Iranian women politician and royal (1919–2008)

- مهرانگیز دولتشاهی
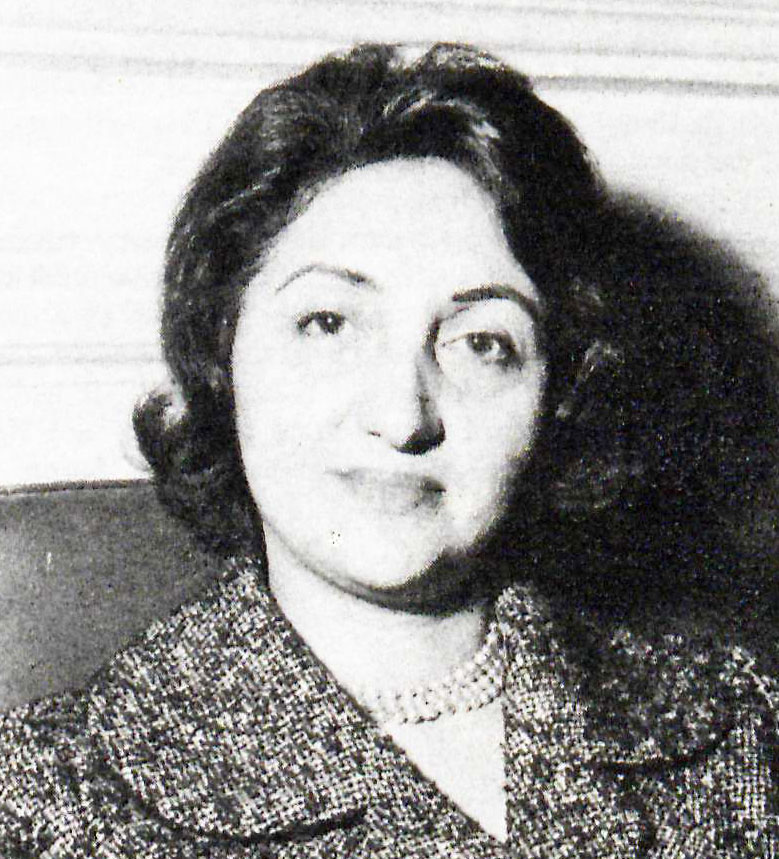

Iranian Ambassador to the Denmark
- In office 1 March 1975 – 1 March 1979
- Preceded by: Parviz Sepahboudi
- Succeeded by: Abbas Amir-Entezam

Member of the Parliament of Iran
- In office 15 January 1963 – 14 January 1975
- Constituency: Kermanshah

Personal details
- Born: 13 December 1919 Esfahan, Sublime State of Persia
- Died: 1 October 2008 (aged 88) Paris, France
- Party: Resurgence Party (1975–1978); New Iran Party (1963–1975)
- Parents: Akhtar ol-Mulk (mother); Mohammad Ali Mirza (father)
- Education: Berlin University; Heidelberg University

Mehrangiz Dowlatshahi (Persian: مهرانگیز دولتشاهی; 13 December 1919 – 11 October 2008) was an Iranian social activist and politician, who held significant positions, including ambassador of Iran to Denmark during the Pahlavi era. She also served as a member of the Majlis for three terms.

== Early life and education ==
Her family were major land owners based in Kermanshah and were progressive aristocrats. Her father was Mohammad Ali Mirza (also known as Meshkout Al Dowleh), majlis member and land owner. He was a member of the Qajar dynasty. Her mother was Akhtar ol-Molk, daughter of Hidayat Qoli Khan. Mehrangiz was the cousin of Esmat Dowlatshahi, fourth wife of Reza Shah.

Concerning the birth date and birthplace of Dowlatshahi there are some conflicting reports which were stated by herself. Abbas Milani states that she gave two different birth years, 1917 and 1919. The same is also reported by Abbas Milani in regard to her birth city, which was given as both Tehran and Isfahan.

Mehrangiz was one of the first Iranian girls who attended a co-education kindergarten. Then she graduated from the Zoroastrian School in Tehran. She held a bachelor's degree from Berlin University. She received a PhD in social and political sciences from Heidelberg University.

== Career ==
Dowlatshahi worked at the social services organization and at the organization for support of prisoners. She established Jama’at-i Rah-i Naw (Persian: The New Path Society) in 1954, which later became part of the International Women's Syndicate. The society offered training to women and advocated equal rights for them. She also launched adult literacy programs in southern Tehran. In 1951, she and activist Safeyeh Firouz met Mohammad Reza Pahlavi to discuss the electoral rights of women in Iran. She was the director of the advisory committee on international affairs of the Women's Organization of Iran (WOI). In 1973, she was appointed president of the International Council of Women and her term ended in 1976.

Dowlatshahi was elected to the Majles in 1963, being one of six female deputies. She served there until 1975. She represented Kermanshah at the Majlis for three terms. She significantly contributed to the passing of the family protection law in 1967 and to its expansion in 1974. She also served as the first minister of women affairs. She became the first woman ambassador of Imperial Iran to Denmark when she was appointed to the post in 1975.

== Later years and death ==
Dowlatshahi was serving as the Iranian ambassador in Denmark when the 1979 revolution occurred. Soon after this incident she left the country and settled in Paris. She had a house in Great Falls, Fairfax County, Virginia, USA, which was sold in 2016. She published a book entitled Society, Government, and Iran’s Women’s Movement in 2002. She died in Paris in October 2008.

== Awards and honors ==
- Grand Cross of the Order of the Dannebrog (Denmark; 14 February 1979)

In 1997, Dowlatshahi was named as the woman of the year by the Iranian Women's Studies Foundation in the United States.
