= Fazael Tadayon =

Imperial Iran's air force commander (1908–1976)

Timsar Fazael Tadayon
- Born: 29 January 1908; Tabriz, Qajar Iran
- Died: 8 February 1977 (aged 69) Lavizan, Tehran, Pahlavi Iran
- Allegiance: Pahlavi Iran
- Branch: Imperial Iranian Air Force
- Service years: 1938–1977
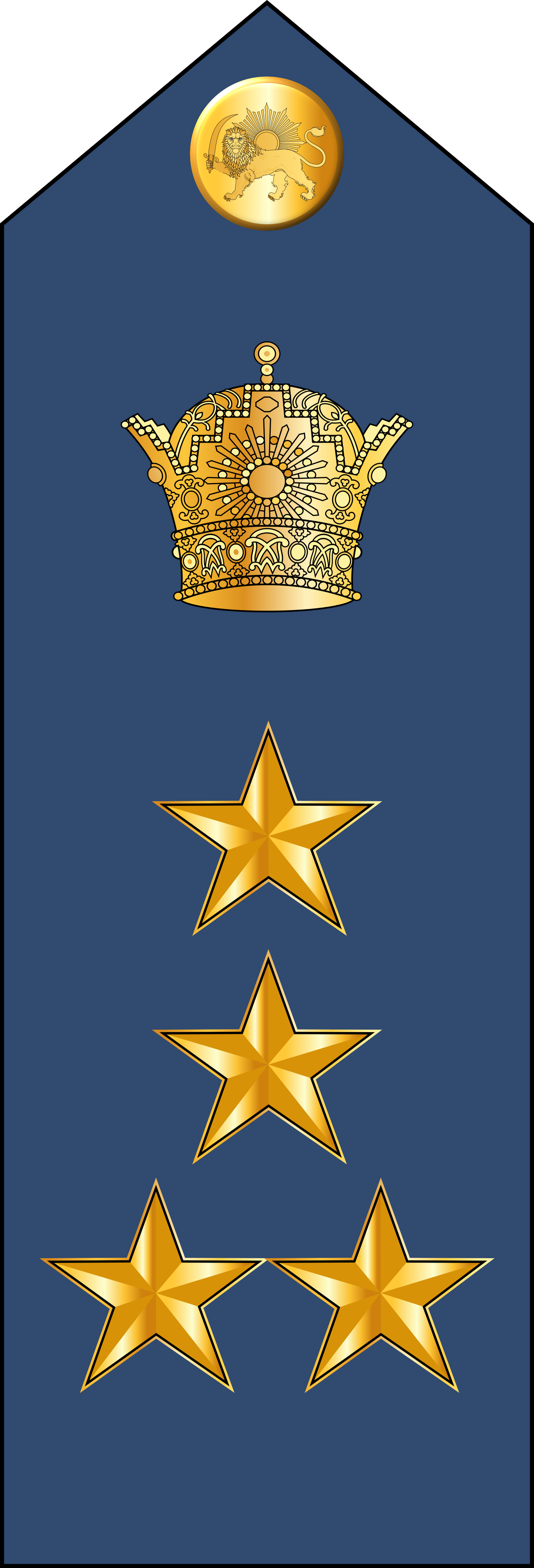
- Rank: General
- Commands: Imperial Iranian Air Force (1975–1977)
- Education: Officers' Academy; War University; Air Command and Staff College

Fazael Tadayon (Persian: فضائل تدین; 29 January 1908 – 7 February 1977) was a full general at the Pahlavi Iran's air force and served as the chief of the staff of the Imperial Iranian Air Force. He was made the commander of the air force on 12 September 1975 replacing Mohammad Amir Khatami who died a day before in a kiting accident. Tadayon's tenure was brief and lasted until 8 February 1977 when he was killed in a helicopter accident. He was succeeded by Amir Hossein Rabii as the chief of Imperial Iranian Air Force.
