= Sharif al-Ulama family =

Iranian family

The Sharif al-Ulama family are descendants of Mir Abd al-Baqi Musavi who was one of the greatest religious scholars of Rasht. He was known as Hujjat al-Islam (the title of the highest ranking scholars at that time) and he was granted the title Sharif al-Ulama by the shah of the time.

He was the son of Sayyid Alireza son of Mir Idris son of Sayyid Husain of the Musavi Sadat of Ziabar in the Gilan province. He is therefore related to scholars such as Ayatollah Sayyid Mahmoud Ziabari, Ayatollah Mir Nejat Ziabari and Ayatollah Sayyid Abd al-Wahab Saleh Ziabari. Being the first of the Sadat of Ziabar to move to Rasht he is also known as Mir Abd al-Baqi Rashti.

His lineage goes back 15 generations to the famous mystic and poet Sayyid Sharafshah Dulabi also known as Pir Sharafshah. Sayed Sharafshah Dulabi was himself a descendant of Imam Musa al-Kazim. He was living in the time around 1390 at the same time of Amir Sasan Gaskari. Sayyid Sharafshah Dulabi was buried near Rezvanshahr. The poetry of Sayyid Sharafshah Dulabi is the first recorded poetry in Gilaki.

When two of Sayyid Sharafshah Dulabis descendants, Sayyid Mohammad Jan and Sayyid Moula Jan, returned to Gilan from Najaf they were given the area of Ziabar by the ruler of the time. At that time Ziabar was very close to the centre of power of the local ruler. This shows the significance of the family in the eyes of the local ruler. The Sadat of Ziabar are all descendants of Sayyid Mohammad Jan and Sayyid Moula Jan.

Because of the family's origin as a Hashimite family it has always been a noble family. Most family members have been important and influential Islamic scholars in their local area.

== Members ==
- Mir Abd al-Baqi Musavi Sharif al-Ulama (d. 1893) m. the daughter of Sayyid Ali Bahrululoom, the author of Al-Burhan Al-Qati’ who was the grandson of Allameh Sayyid Mohammad Mahdi Bahruruloom
  - Ayatollah Aqa Sayyid Murtaza Sharif al-Ulama (d. 1921), m. Maryam Khanum Dor al-Saltaneh, the daughter of Sayyid Ahmad Sadri Qavam al-Islam
    - Sayyid Hassan Khan “Mujahid” (d. 1921) commander of Mirza Kuchak Khan m. Asieh Khanum Rajabi, the daughter of the khan of Jafarabad
      - Mohmmad Husain Khan Rezaei
      - Asadollah Khan Alizadeh
    - Sayyid Zain al-Abedin Khatami Fakhr al-Sultan
      - Sayyid Husain Khatami
    - Mir Mahmoud Khatami Ajlal al-Sultan m. Fatima Imami, the sister of Ayatollah Sayyid Hassan Imami
      - Mohammad Amir Khatami (1918–1975) general of the Iranian airforce – m. Princess Fatimeh Pahlavi
        - Kambiz Khatami (1961)
        - Ramtin Khatami (1967)
    - Sayyid Mohammad Reza Roshan
    - Sharif al-Saltanah, she was the only daughter of Sayyid Murtaza Sharif al-Ulama
  - Ayatollah Sayyid Husain Aqa Mujtahid Musavi
    - Ayatollah Mir Abdulbaqi Sadr al-Shari’ah m. the daughter of Kamran Mirza Nayeb al-Saltaneh
      - Sayyid Naser Musavi
      - Sayyid Musa Musavi
    - Sayyid Mohammad Reza “Aziz”
      - Sayyid Husain “Ata” Musavi, lawyer and a famous poet
      - Sayyid Abd al-Ali “Rahmat” Musavi, a famous poet
  - Ayatollah Sayyid Husain Aqa Bahrululoom Rashti (1850–1909) m. Naz Bigam, the daughter of Sayyid Husain Bahrululoom
    - Ayatollah Sayyid Hassan Bahrululoom Rashti (1899–1977) m. the daughter of Ayatollah Sayed Husain Qommi
      - Sayyid Mohammad Taqi Musavi Bahrululoom
      - Sayyid Mohammad Ali Musavi Bahrululoom
      - Sayyid Mohammad Husain Musavi Bahrululoom
      - Sayyid Abd al-Amir Musavi Bahrululoom
    - Sayyid Javad Bahrululoom
    - Mir Mohammad Ali Ale Bahrululoom, leader of the prayer in the Mola Mohammad Ali mosque in Rasht
    - Mir Mahdi Bahrululoom
    - Mir Jafar Bahrululoom
    - Mir Sayyid Mohammad Baqir Bahrululoom
  - Ayatollah Aqa Sayyid Ahmad Iftikhar al-Fuqaha
  - Ayatollah Aqa Sayyid Sadeq Sadr al-Fuqaha m. the daughter of Sayyid Mohammad Taqi Ziabari
    - Sayyid Saleh Musavi
    - Sayyid Husain Musavi
  - Bibi Khanum m. Sheikh Javad Rashti. Their daughter married Ayatollah Sayyid Abd al-Wahab Saleh Ziabari
