= Hugo-Jacobi-Preis =

- Awarded for: Literary prize
- Country: Germany

Hugo-Jacobi-Preis is a literary prize of Germany.

== Recipients ==
- 1955 Rainer Brambach
- 1956 Hans Magnus Enzensberger
- 1957 Cyrus Atabay
- 1958 Peter Rühmkorf
- 1959 John Poethen
- 1960 Helmut Heißenbüttel
- 1964 Walter Gross
- 1967 Michael Ende
