= Hamdam al-Saltaneh Pahlavi =

First child and daughter of Reza Shah

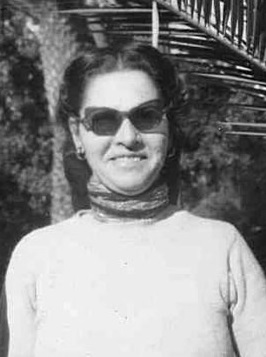
- Born: Fatemeh Pahlavi; 22 February 1903; Tehran, Sublime State of Iran
- Died: 5 April 1992 (aged 89); Tehran, Iran
- Burial: Emamzadeh Taher
- Spouse: Hadi Atabay
- Issue: Amir Reza Atabay; Cyrus Atabay; Simin Atabay
- Father: Reza Shah
- Mother: Maryam (Tajmah) Savadkoohi

Hamdam al-Saltaneh Pahlavi (Persian: همدم‌السلطنه پهلوی; 22 February 1903 – 5 April 1992) was the first child and daughter of Reza Shah of Iran and Maryam Savadkoohi.

== Biography ==
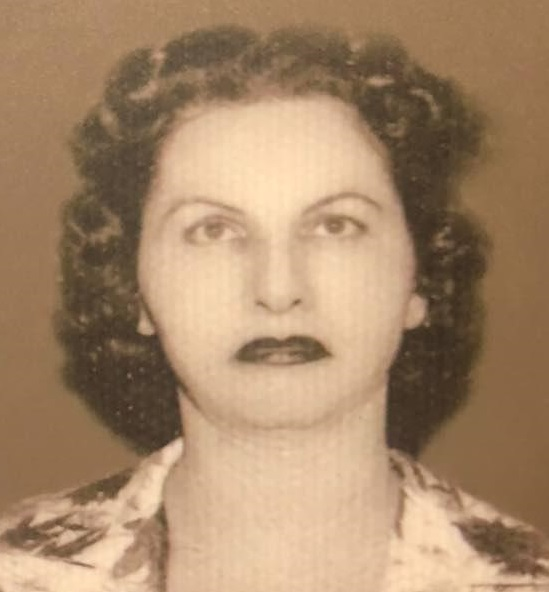
Hamdam al-Saltaneh Pahlavi in 1930

She was born on 22 February 1903 in Tehran and died in 1992. Her mother, Maryam Savadkoohi (also known as Tajmah), died when she was only one year old. Other sources mention Safiye Hamadani as her mother, a woman to whom Reza Khan was married briefly while serving in Hamadan, Iran.

Hamdam al-Saltaneh married Hadi Atabay, and in 1925 bore her first child, a son, Amir Reza Atabay. Later, she gave birth to two more children, a son, Cyrus Atabay and a daughter, Simin (or Simine).

=== Honours ===
- Order of the Pleiades (Neshaan-e haft peikar), 2nd Class, (1957, Iran)
- Order of Aryamehr (Neshān-e Āryāmehr), 2nd Class, (26 September 1967, Iran)

== See also ==
- List of Iranian women royalty
