= Mohammad H. Mehrmand =

Iranian Air Force pilot (1928–2024)

Lieutenant General Mohammad Hossein Mehrmand
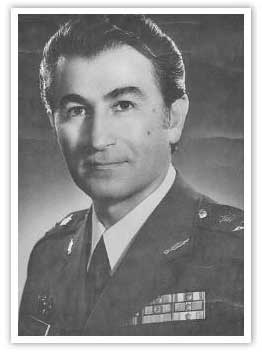
- Native name: محمد حسین مهرمند
- Born: 9 September 1928; Tehran, Iran
- Died: 9 September 2024 (aged 96) US
- Branch: Imperial Iranian Air Force (IIAF)
- Service years: 1949–1979
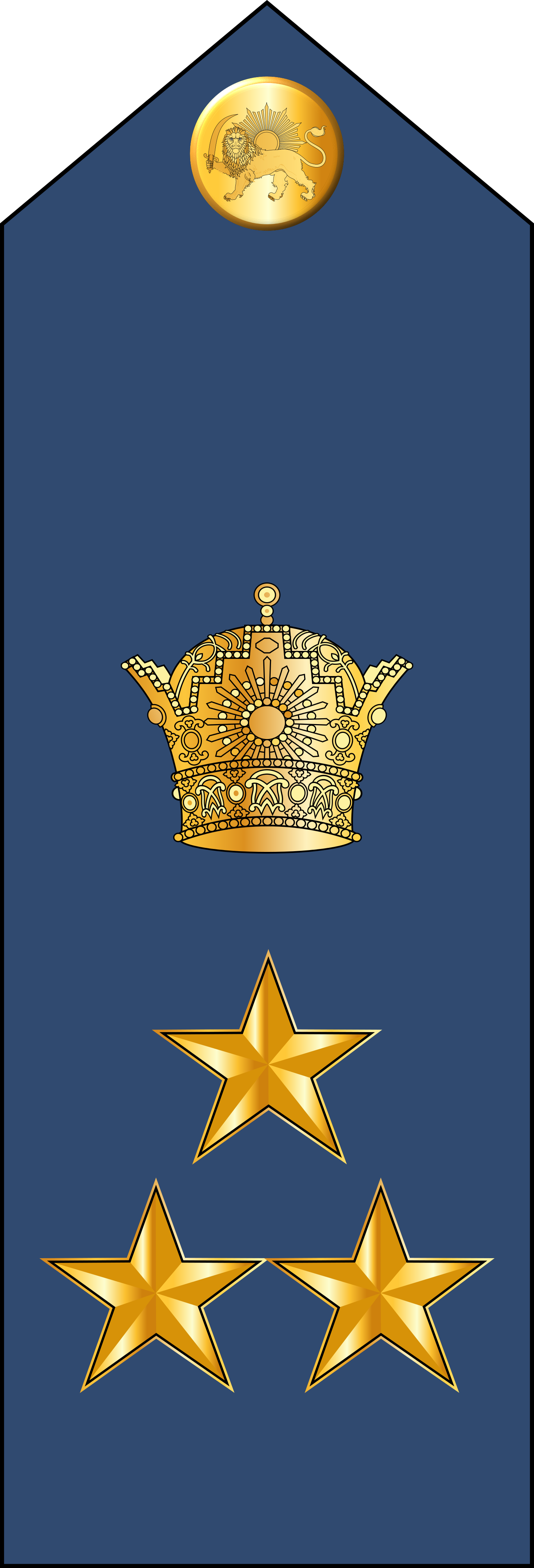
- Rank: Lieutenant general(Sepahbod)
- Commands: IIAF: 204th TFS, Vahdati AFB (Dezful) (F-86); Deputy Commander Operations, Mehrabad AFB (Tehran); Deputy Commander, Vahdati AFB (Dezful); Wing Commander, Shahrokhi AFB (Hamedan) (F-5/F-4); Deputy Commander, Tactical Air Command (TAC) (Shiraz); Commander, TAC (Shiraz)
- Known for: Last commander of IIAF Tactical Air Command

Lieutenant General Mohammad Hossein Mehrmand (9 September 1928 – 9 September 2024) was a senior fighter pilot and commander in the Imperial Iranian Air Force(IIAF) who served from 1949 to 1979. He held multiple commands, the last one being the Tactical Air Command (TAC).

== Early life ==
Mohammad H. Mehrmand was born in 1928 in Tehran, where he attended elementary school, and later a military boarding school for secondary studies. In 1949 he was accepted into the Iranian Army military academy as an officer cadet.

== Career ==
In his first year at the academy, he transferred to the newly established IIAF academy to become a pilot cadet and trained on various propeller planes like the De Havilland Tiger Moth, North American T-6 Harvard, and the Republic P-47 Thunderbolt. He earned his commission as a second lieutenant in 1952. The following year, Lieutenant Mehrmand was deployed at the US Air Force base in Furstenfeldbruck in West Germany to train as a jet instructor. After returning to Iran he was stationed at the new Tactical Fighter Base (TFB) 1 at Mehrabad in Tehran, flying F-84 Thunderjets, followed by Vahdati air force base in Dezful, flying the more advanced F-86 Sabres as a squadron leader, then deputy commander of the base. He continued further jet instructor trainings in the US and officer courses, as well as several command capacities including deputy wing commander.

In 1972 he took command of the recently established 3rd TFB, known as Shahrokhi, in Hamedan, initially flying Northrop F-5 Freedom Fighters, then the F-4 Phantom II. Shahrokhi become an important base, and played a significant role in the Iran Iraq war of the 1980s.

== Last command ==
By the mid-1970s, the IIAF established the Tactical Air Command (TAC) to better manage its operations and command of all ten of the IIAF's tactical bases. Major General Mehrmand became its deputy commander. One year later, he was promoted to Lieutenant General and became commander of TAC. He remained in this capacity until the 1979 Islamic revolution, and oversaw initiatives and joint exercises with the United States and allies, including live fire demonstrations in front of US and Iranian dignitaries.

As the 1979 Islamic revolution unfolded, thousands of US military and civilian personnel and their families in Iran needed to be evacuated. Unrest had spread throughout the cities and into some of the military ranks, where some elements threatened to block the exit of the Americans. Lieutenant General Mehrmand personally intervened and directly negotiated with those elements and convinced them to not follow through, thus ensuring the safe evacuation of the American personnel.

Lieutenant General Mehrmand retired from the IIAF when it ceased to exist in 1979, and ultimately resettled with his family in the United States where he was active among the Iranian opposition and veterans' community. He has issued statements in support of popular opposition in Iran, and in 2023 he published his memoirs, "High Sky is my Place". He died in southern California on 9 September 2024, his 96th birthday.
