= Saeed Mehdiyoun =

Iranian army officer (1928–1980)

Timsar Saeed Mehdiyoun
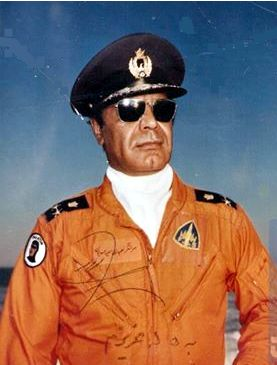
- Born: Seyyed Saeed Mehdiyoun; 17 April 1928; Zanjan, Imperial State of Iran
- Died: 15 August 1980 (aged 52); Iran
- Military career
- Allegiance: Imperial State of Iran
- Branch: Imperial Iranian Air Force
- Service years: 1949–1979
- Rank: Lieutenant general

Saeed Mehdiyoun (Persian: سعید مهدیون; 1928 – 15 August 1980) was an Iranian fighter pilot. He was appointed as the commander of Imperial Iranian Air Force in mid-February 1979 replacing Amir Hossein Rabii in the post. However, he was ousted two days later for lack of popularity among the subordinate personnel. While trying to flee the country, he was arrested for taking part in Nojeh coup plot and subsequently executed for it on 15 August 1980.

Military offices
Preceded by Amir Hossein Rabii	Commander of the Imperial Iranian Air Force; 1979	Succeeded by Shapour Azarbarzin
