= Cyrus Atabay =

Iranian-German poet

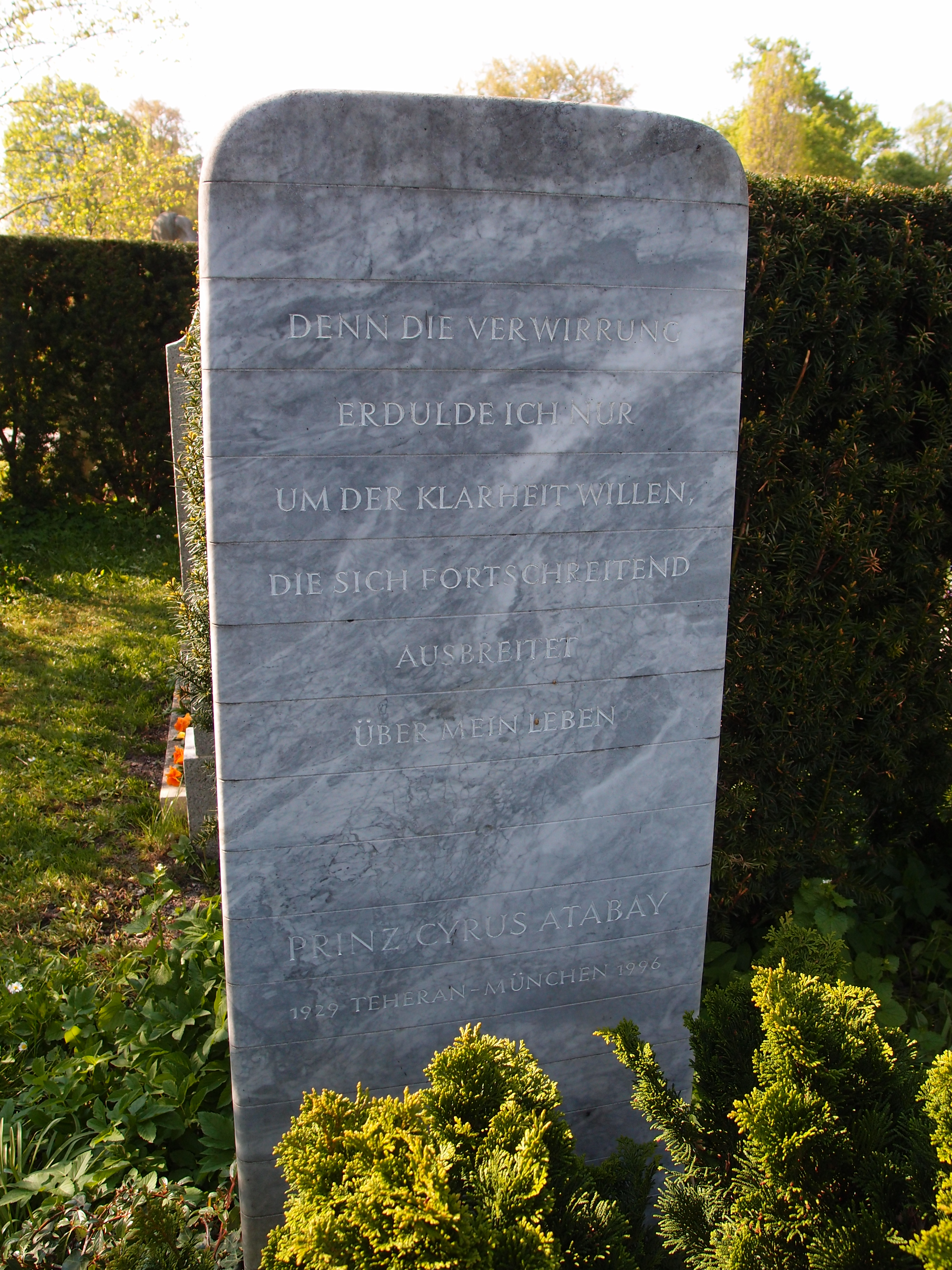
- Grave tomb of Cyrus Atabay in Munich
- Born: 6 September 1929; Sa'dabad Complex, Tehran, Iran
- Died: 26 January 1996 (aged 66); Munich, Germany
- Parents: Hadi Atabay (father); Hamdam Saltaneh Pahlavi (mother)
- Relatives: Reza Shah (grandfather); Mohammad Reza Pahlavi (uncle)
- Family: Pahlavi dynasty
- Awards: 1957: Hugo-Jacobi-Preis; 1990: Adelbert von Chamisso Prize

Cyrus Atabay (Persian: سیروس آتابای, 6 September 1929 – 26 January 1996) was a Persian-German poet. He mostly wrote in German and also translated works of Persian literature into German. Atabay was decorated on numerous occasions for his literary efforts, including the Adelbert von Chamisso Prize in 1990 and the Hugo-Jacobi-Preis in 1957.

== Biography ==
Cyrus Atabay was born in Tehran as the son of Hadi Atabay and Hamdam Saltaneh Pahlavi, the first daughter of Reza Shah. Before turning 8 years old, Cyrus was sent to Berlin by his father to attend school; he lived in Germany during World War II. After the war, he lived in Iran and Switzerland. In Switzerland, Cyrus's talent for poetry was noted by author Max Rychner, and in Germany by Gottfried Benn; both wrote positively about him. His works were published for the first time in 1948 in Die Tat ("The deed"), a Swiss journal. In 1951, Cyrus returned to Germany from Switzerland and studied literature at Ludwig-Maximilians-Universität München (LMU) (1952–1960). As a student in Munich, his "first three poetry collections" were published, in 1956, 1958 and 1960 respectively. In 1965, Cyrus published his first work of translation, consisting of a selection of ghazals originally written by the Medieval Persian poet Hafez. In 1978, Cyrus moved to London where he met Elias Canetti and Erich Fried. He moved back to Germany in 1983 where he lived until his death.

== Awards ==
- 1957: Hugo-Jacobi-Preis
- 1983: full member of the Bayerische Akademie der Schönen Künste (Bavarian Academy of Fine Arts))
- 1990: Adelbert von Chamisso Prize
- 1993: Member of Deutsche Akademie für Sprache und Dichtung (the German Academy for Language and Literature)

== Publications ==
- Die Worte der Ameisen. Düsseldorf: Classen Verlag, 1971, 100 pp.
- Gesange von Morgen: Neue Iranische Lyrik. Hamburg: Classen Verlag, 1968, 126 pp.
- Hafis, Rumi, Omar Chajjam; übertragen von Cyrus Atabay: Die schönsten Gedichte aus dem klassischen Persien. Herausgegeben und mit einem Nachwort Versehen von Kurt Scharf. 4th ed. Munich: C. H. Beck, 2015.

== Sources ==
- Rezvani, Saeid (2014). "ATABAY, CYRUS". In Yarshater, Ehsan (ed.). Encyclopædia Iranica (Online ed.). Encyclopædia Iranica Foundation.
