= Esmat Dowlatshahi =

Iranian royal and Reza Shah's fourth wife (1905–1995)

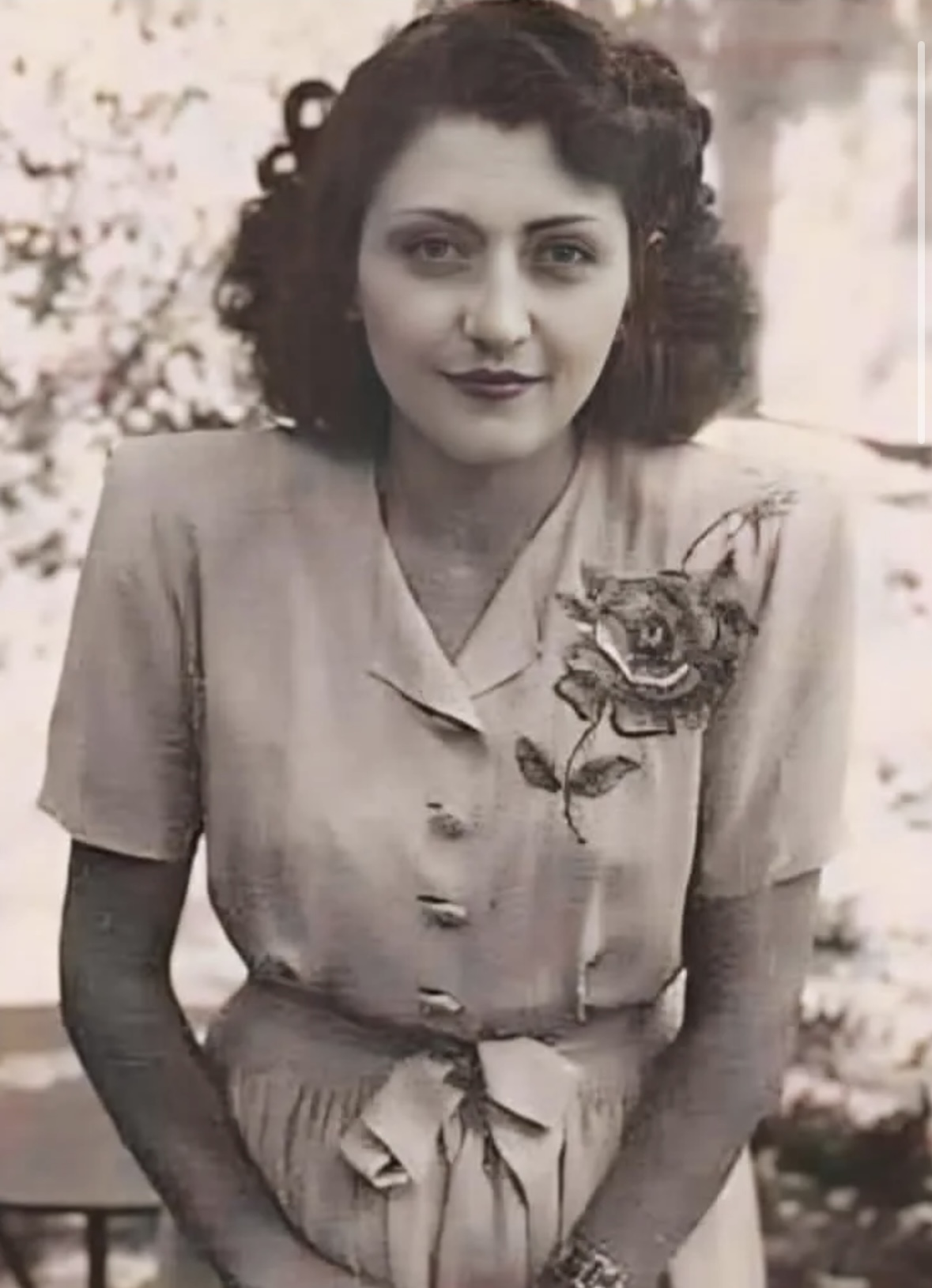
- Born: Esmat ol-Molouk Dowlatshahi; 1905; Kermanshah, Qajar Iran
- Died: 25 July 1995 (aged 89–90); Tehran, Iran
- Burial: Behesht-e Zahra, Tehran
- Spouse: Reza Shah (m. 1923; died 1944)
- Issue: Prince Abdul Reza; Prince Ahmad Reza; Prince Mahmoud Reza; Princess Fatemeh; Prince Hamid Reza
- House: Qajar dynasty (by birth); Pahlavi dynasty (by marriage)
- Father: Prince Gholam Ali Mirza Dowlatshahi
- Mother: Mobtahej Od-dowlah Morad

Esmat ol-Molouk Dowlatshahi (Persian: عصمت‌الملوک دولتشاهی; 1905 – 25 July 1995) was an Iranian royal and the fourth and last wife of Reza Shah.

== Early life ==
Dowlatshahi was born in 1905. She was a member of the Qajar dynasty. Her father was Gholam Ali Mirza "Mojalal od-Dowleh" Dowlatshahi (1878–1934). Her mother was Mobtahedj od-Dowleh, daughter of Ebtehadj Saltaneh and Abou Nasr Mirza Hessam Saltaneh II. Her paternal grandfather was Hessam-Saltaneh I. She had two brothers and one sister, Ashraf Saltaneh II. Mehrangiz Dowlatshahi, member of the Majlis and Iranian ambassador, was her cousin.

== Marriage ==
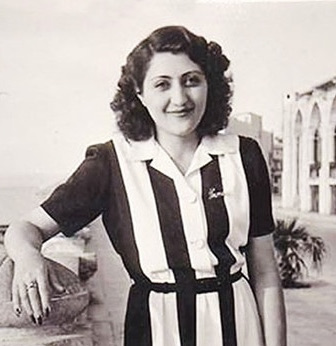
In her youth

Dowlatshahi and Reza Shah wed in 1923. She was his fourth, last and favourite wife. Reza Shah was the minister of war when they married. From this marriage five children were born: Abdul Reza, Ahmad Reza, Mahmoud Reza, Fatemeh and Hamid Reza Pahlavi. Her husband became Shah of Iran in 1925. However, it was her husband's second wife Tadj ol-Molouk who was given a public role as queen. Tadj ol-Molouk was unhappy in this situation due to her jealousy of Dowlatshahi, as she revealed in her memoirs.

Dowlatshahi and Reza Shah lived in the Marble Palace in Tehran with their children. She accompanied her husband to Mauritius when he was exiled there in September 1941, but she returned to Iran after a few months.

== Later life and death ==
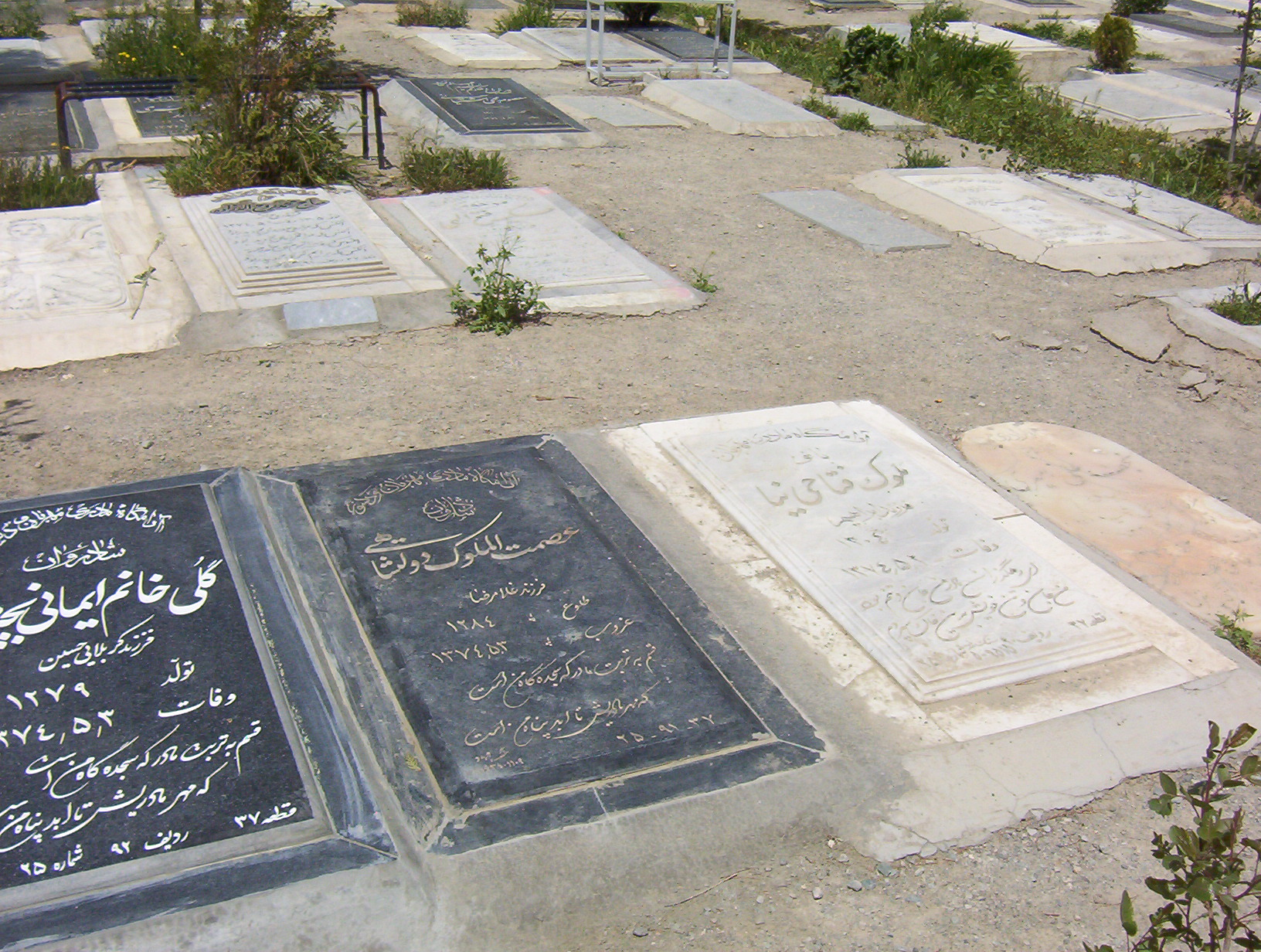
Grave of Esmat Dolatshahi (2nd from the left) in Behesht-e Zahra

Dowlatshahi stayed in Iran after the 1979 Islamic Revolution. She visited the Museum of Reza Shah Pahlavi in Johannesburg, South Africa, on 16 June 1980.

She died on 25 July 1995. She was buried in the Behesht-e Zahra cemetery, Tehran.

== See also ==
- List of Iranian women royalty
