= Amir Hossein Rabii =

Commander in chief of Imperial Iranian Air Force (1930–1979)

Timsar Amir Hossein Rabii
- امیرحسین ربیعی
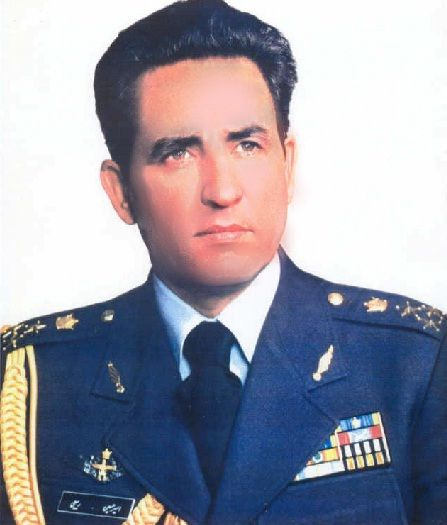
- General Rabii, c. 1970s

Commander of the Imperial Iranian Air Force
- In office 8 February 1977 – 11 February 1979
- Monarch: Mohammad Reza Pahlavi
- Prime Minister: Amir-Abbas Hoveyda; Jamshid Amouzegar; Jafar Sharif-Emami; Gholam Reza Azhari; Shapour Bakhtiar
- Preceded by: Fazael Tadayon
- Succeeded by: Kiumars Saghafi

Minister of Housing
- In office 6 November 1978 – 22 November 1978
- Monarch: Mohammad Reza Pahlavi
- Prime Minister: Gholam Reza Azhari
- Preceded by: Parviz Avini
- Succeeded by: Manouchehr Behravan

Personal details
- Born: 18 October 1930 Kermanshah, Pahlavi Iran
- Died: 9 April 1979 (aged 48) Qasr Prison, Tehran, Iran
- Resting place: Behesht-e Zahra
- Spouse: Gerda Rabii

Military service
- Allegiance: Pahlavi Iran
- Branch/service: Imperial Iranian Air Force
- Years of service: 1949–1979
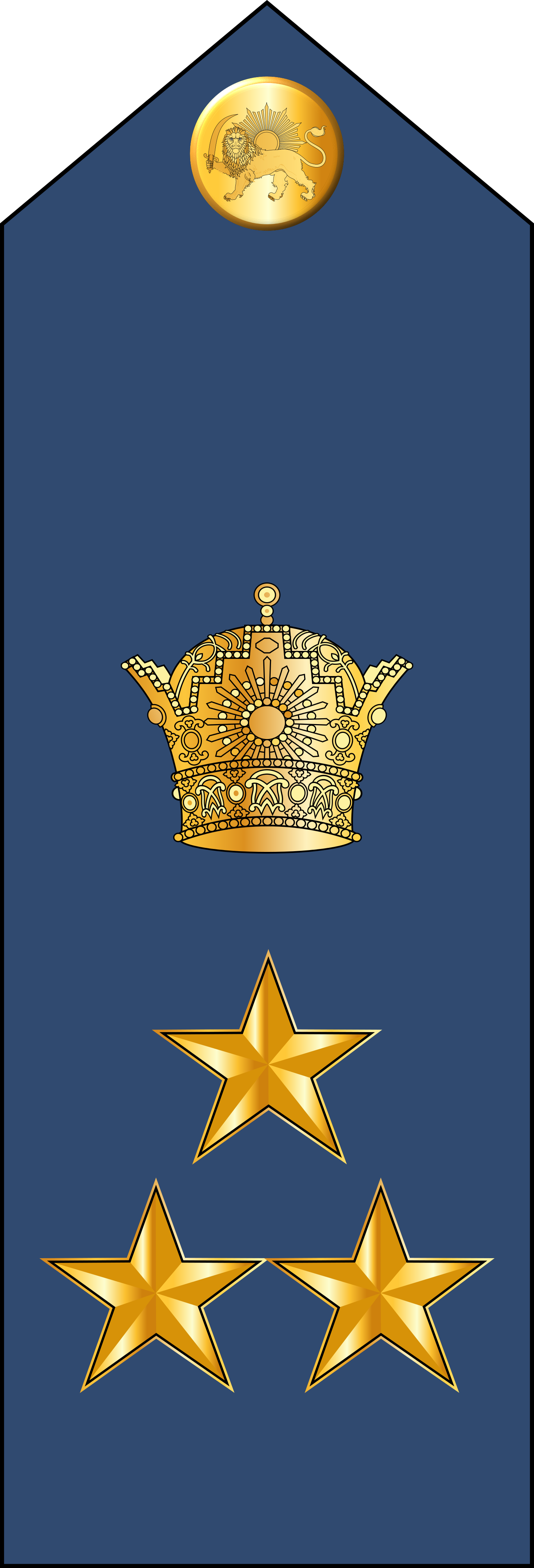
- Rank: Lieutenant General

Amir Hossein Rabii (Persian: امیرحسین ربیعی; 18 October 1930 – 9 April 1979) was an Iranian senior military officer who served as the commander in chief of Imperial Iranian Air Force from 1977 to 1979. He was the last commander of the force.

== Education ==
Rabii was among the first military officers of the Imperial Iranian Air Force who were trained at Fürstenfeldbruck air base in West Germany during the 1950s and later at Reese Air Force Base in the United States. He and other military officers including Nader Jahanbani also took the jet pilot instructor course.

== Career and activities ==
Rabii was a fighter pilot on the F-84G Thunderjet, F-86 Sabre, F-5A Freedom Fighter and later on the F-4 Phantom II. After returning to Iran he contributed to the foundation of the acrobat team in the air force, named the Golden Crown, in 1958. He served as the commander of the first fighter base in Tehran.

Rabii was the commander of the Tactical Air Command in Shiraz until 1977. He served as commander in chief of Imperial Iranian Air Force (IIAF) from Spring 1977 to 1979 with the rank of lieutenant general. He succeeded Fazael Tadayon in the post. When he was in command, there were forty-eight thousand men in the air force. Barry Rubin, a veteran Middle East expert, described him as possibly "the most able officer in the top circles of the armed forces."

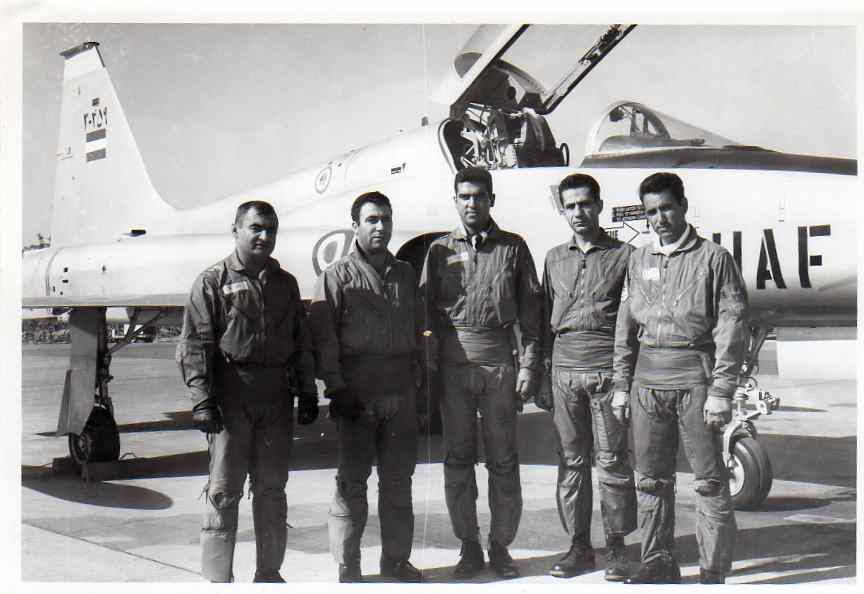
Rabii, right, with other Golden Crown pilots

In August 1978, Rabii indirectly urged Moshe Dayan, the foreign minister of Israel, to meet the Shah, Mohammad Reza Pahlavi, and to tell him the increasing tension in Iran. Rabii complained that the Shah had been ignoring his and others' remarks. The visit was paid by Dayan in the following days.

In the military cabinet formed by Gholam Reza Azhari Rabii served as an acting minister of housing briefly from November to December 1978. However, Hassan Toufanian, deputy defense minister, and Rabii did not cooperate with Azhari arguing that the prime minister had assigned mostly army officers as cabinet members. In addition, both Toufanian and Rabii tended to carry out a coup to stabilize the turmoil in the country, but their idea was not backed by other senior military officials, including General Abbas Gharabaghi. Rabii himself was not so enthusiastic to materialize his hardliner views without getting support from the Shah.

Rabii was one of the military officials who met Robert Huyser, the deputy commander of US forces in Europe, during the latter's visit to Iran from 4 January to 3 February 1979. Three days before leaving the country on 13 January, the Shah told all commanders, including Rabii, that they should support the government of Shapour Bakhtiar. Following the 1979 revolution clashes occurred between supporters of Ayatollah Khomeini and people loyal to the Shah regime. Rabii instructed his men not to kill anyone on the other side. When Prime Minister Bakhtiar ordered him to bomb the arms factory in central Tehran, he refused to carry out this order. Rabii did not support the revolution, but a significant portion of the air force cadets and young skilled military technical personnel did.

Ayatollah Khomeini asked Rabii to submit his resignation at his residence, and he submitted it there. Saeid Mahdioun replaced Rabii as commander of the air force.

== Personal life ==
Rabii married a German woman, Gerda, and had two sons, Arian and Arman.

Rabii had a good command of English. In an intelligence report by the USA Defense Department dated 13 February 1975 Rabii was described as a warm, open and humorous Muslim, but not a strict religious person. He was also regarded in the same report as a very handsome and well-educated military official who was much ahead of his colleagues.

== Death ==
Rabii was arrested in February 1979 along with Tehran martial law governor Mehdi Rahimi, air force general Ayat Mahaghghi (Mohagheghi) and Isfahan martial law governor Reza Naji, and they were all taken to Alawi school in Tehran. Special press conferences were organized by the Islamic regime to publicly display these officials, including former Prime Minister Amir-Abbas Hoveyda, former SAVAK chief Nematollah Nasiri and Rabii, which were broadcast nationally. During the initial interrogations, Rabii stated that the air force purchased advanced warplanes and other military equipment from the US, which were all in the country, and that the air force of Iran was intact and the second most powerful force in the world.

Rabii was secretly tried and in the court, he stated "General Huyser threw the Shah out of the country like a dead mouse." He was sentenced to death on charges of corruption on earth and treason among the others. Local dailies reported that the verdict was based on the confessions of other Shah-period officials. He and nine other civil and military officials were executed by the security forces of the Islamic Republic of Iran in Qasr prison of Tehran on 9 April 1979.
