= Marble Palace (Tehran) =

Royal palace in Tehran, Iran

Coordinates: 35.689072°N 51.401789°E

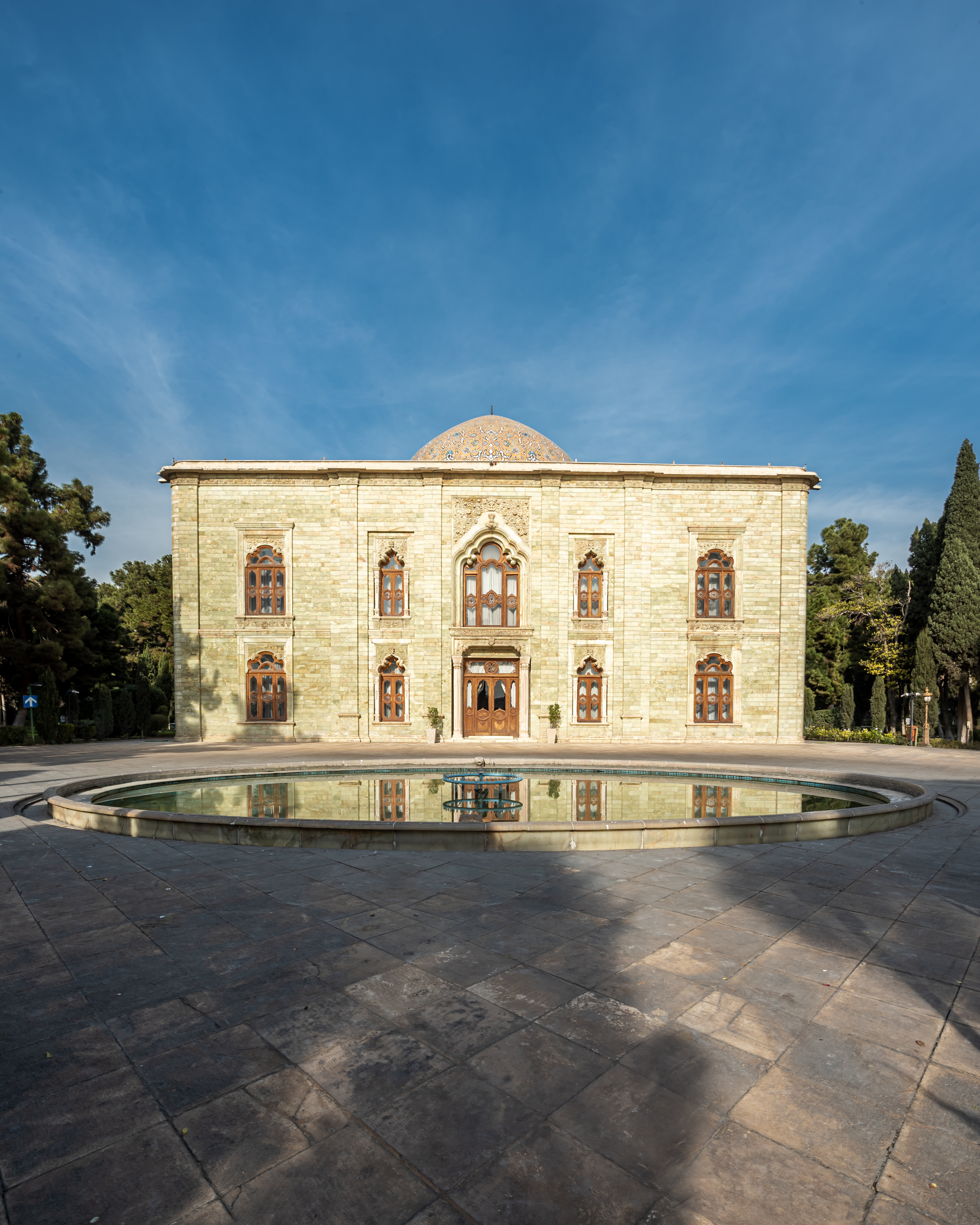
- Interactive map of the Marble Palace area

General information
- Architectural style: Eclectic architecture, combining Eastern and Western architectural features
- Location: Tehran, Iran
- Construction started: 1933
- Completed: 1937; 89 years ago
- Client: Reza Shah Pahlavi

Technical details
- Size: 35,462 square meters (land area)

Design and construction
- Architect: Fathallah Firdaws
- Engineer: Joseph Leon

The Marble Palace (Persian: کاخ مرمر, romanized: Kākh-e Marmar) is a historic building and former royal residence in Tehran, Iran. It was built in 1933 under the Pahlavi dynasty, located in the city centre. After the Iranian Revolution, the palace was used for nearly four decades by various state institutions.

Initially, it served as the headquarters of the Revolutionary Committees, later becoming the office of senior judiciary officials, and subsequently the office of former President Akbar Hashemi Rafsanjani as well as a venue for meetings of the Expediency Discernment Council.

In 2018, the palace was transferred by the Expediency Council to the Mostazafan Foundation. Following extensive restoration in 2020, it opened to the public for the first time as the Museum of Iranian Art.

== History ==
The land on which the Marble Palace stands originally belonged to Qajar princes, including members of the Farmanfarmaian family. The palace was commissioned by Mohammad Reza Tavaziyashvili Khan, the Elder of Karaj, and designed by architect Levon Tadosian. It was initially built as Mohammad Reza Pahlavi's private residence, but after being gifted to the Pahlavi dynasty, it became the office and winter residence of his father, Reza Shah Pahlavi. Before the enactment of the National Treasury Law, Iranian National Jewels were transferred from Golestan Palace to this palace and kept in its basement.

Reza Shah intended to construct a marble building on the site of the present Marble Palace. After receiving a golden canopy inspired by the dome of Sheikh Lotfollah Mosque in Isfahan, he decided to begin construction and to crown the building with a dome modeled after that mosque. Construction began in 1933 and continued until 1937. During the production of the dome’s tiles, craftsmen faced difficulties achieving the cream-colored background glaze; this was resolved by a master tile-maker named Izadi, who used a mixture containing gold. The interior wall decorations (tazhib) were carried out by Hossein Taherzadeh Behzad. Reza Shah and his fourth spouse Esmat Dowlatshahi lived at the palace with their five children until Reza Shah's exile in 1941. Reza Shah signed his letter of abdication at the palace in September 1941.

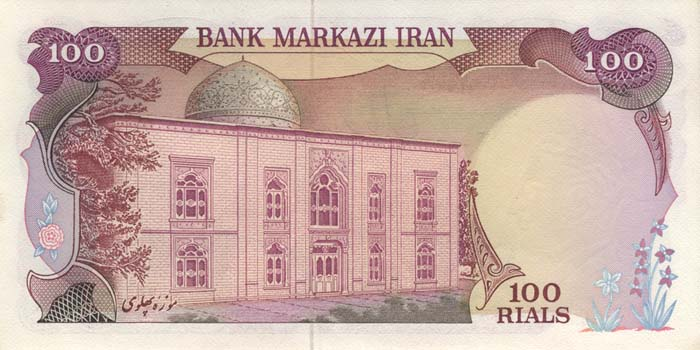
The image of the Marble Palace on a 100 Iranian rial banknote dated 1974

In the early years of Mohammad Reza Shah's reign, the palace served as the official royal office and a venue for state meetings, receptions, and audiences. Mohammad Reza Shah and Queen Fawzia lived in the palace, and the Shah's marriage to Soraya Esfandiary, as well as his engagement to Farah Diba, took place there. Following the attempted assassination of the Shah in the palace grounds by Reza Shams-Abadi, the royal office was moved to Sahebgharaniyeh Palace.

After the Iranian Revolution, the palace was closed and it was temporarily used as the headquarters of the Revolutionary Committees. It was later assigned to senior officials of the judiciary, housing offices of judiciary figures such as Yousef Sanei, Mousavi Ardabili, and Mohammad Yazdi. In 1995, the judiciary vacated the palace and moved to Shapour Gholamreza Palace. The building remained unused for some time until the end of Hashemi Rafsanjani’s presidency, and it became the headquarters of the Expediency Discernment Council and Rafsanjani’s office. Council meetings continued there until two years after Rafsanjani’s death, after which they moved to the former Senate building. In 2018, the palace was transferred by the Expediency Council to the Mostazafan Foundation. Following restoration, it was reopened in 2020 for the first time to the public as the Museum of Iranian Art.

== Architecture ==
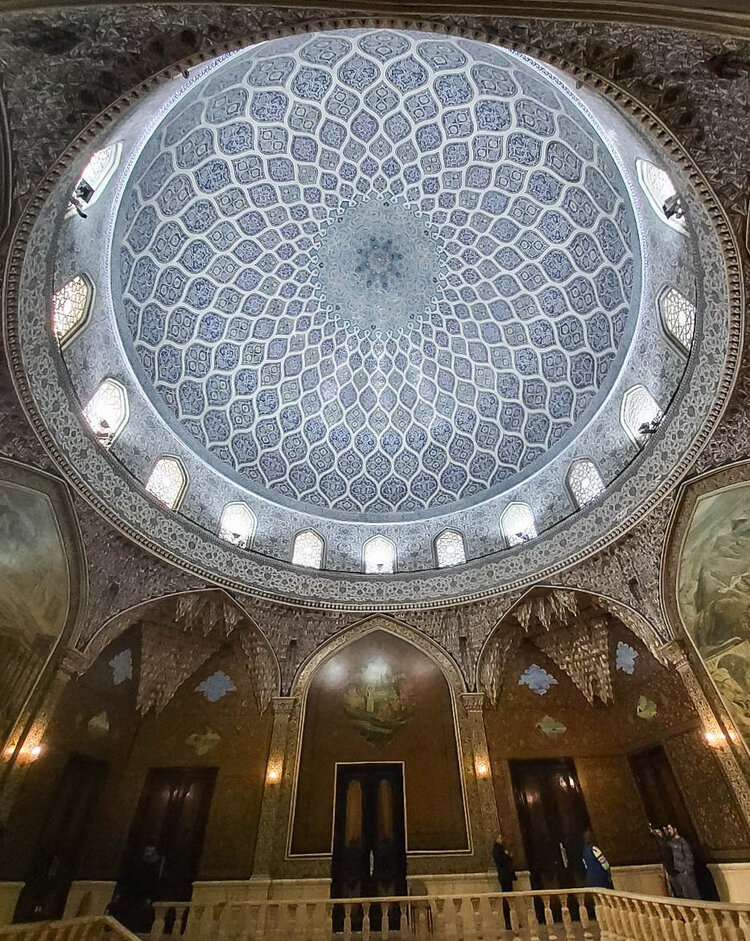
Inside the dome, inspired from Sheikh Lotfollah Mosque in Isfahan.

The design of the two story palace was first developed by Ostad Jafar Khan. However, the final sketch was produced by Ostad Haidar Khan. The overall architectural style of the palace is eclectic, combining Eastern, including Qajar architectural features, and Western architectural styles.

The palace is surrounded by a garden. The external surface of the palace is of white marble. The stone entrance of the palace where two statues of Achaemenid soldiers holding arrows were erected particularly reflects eclectic architectural style. These statues were carved by Iranian artist Jafar Khan. The palace has other gates which were made by local craftsmen from different provinces. The palace is covered by a huge dome that is a replica of the Sheikh Lotfollah mosque in Isfahan. The dome is covered by arabesque tiles with scroll-like patterns.

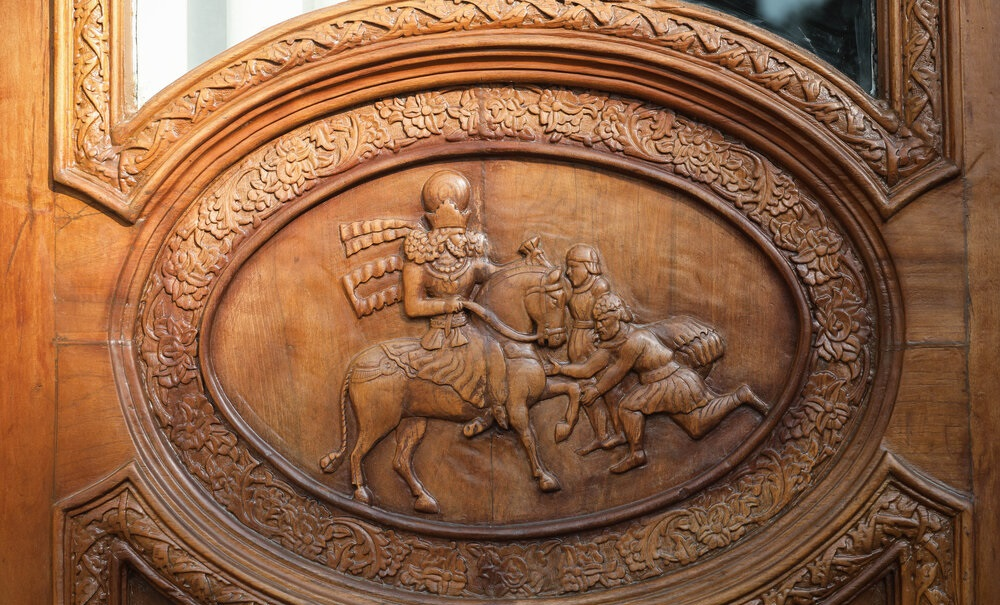
One of the palace’s wooden doors depicts Shapur I's victory relief at Naqsh-e Rostam, showing the Roman emperor Valerian kneeling before Shapur after Rome's defeat in 260 AD. The palace contain dozens of wooden doors, each featuring unique designs distinct from the others.

The internal area of the palace is highly formal with heavily carved doors and extremely high ceilings. The palace has a very large reception room featuring ayeneh-kari similar to many mosques and holy shrines in the country. The room is known as the "Hall of Mirrors". The interior of the palace was furnished by rich fabrics and rugs. Decorations were made by the Iranian architect Hossein Lorzadeh. The tiles used at the palace were produced by Ostad Yazdi and paintings by Ostad Behzad. The land area of the palace is 35,462 square metres (3.5 ha; 8.8 acres), 2,870 square metres (0.3 ha; 0.7 acres) of which is used for residence.

== Visit ==
After more than four decades, the Palace was opened to the public for the first time on the morning of 26 January 2020. The palace is located at the intersection of Imam Khomeini Street and Valiasr Street, within Tehran’s governmental complex. Visitors are required to present their ID card or Passport to enter the museum.

== Gallery ==
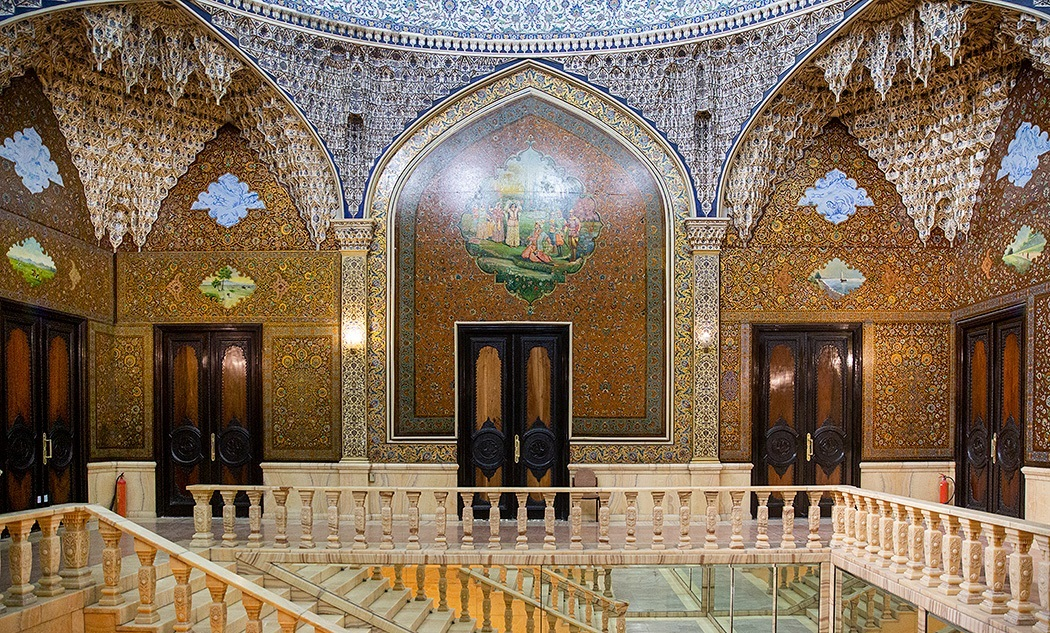

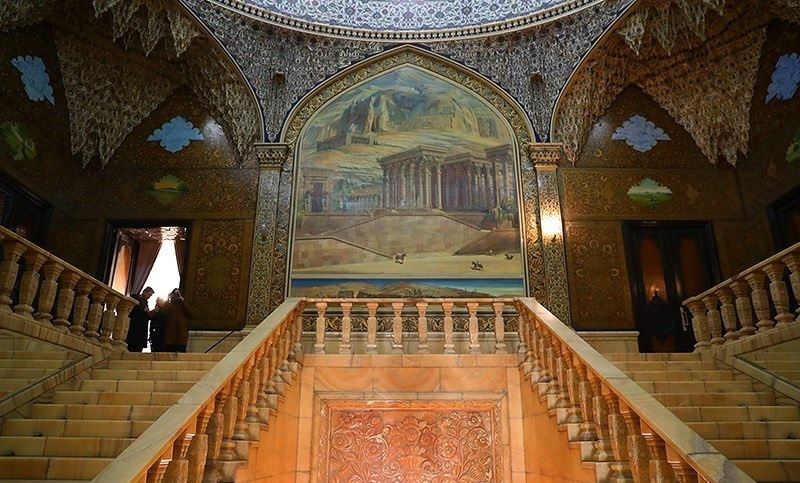

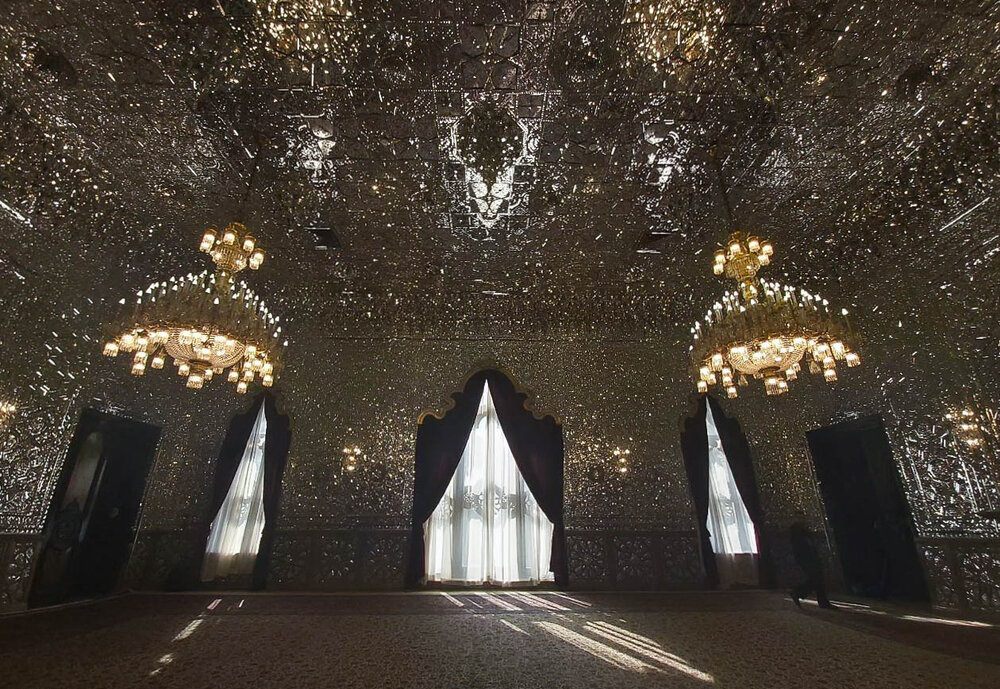

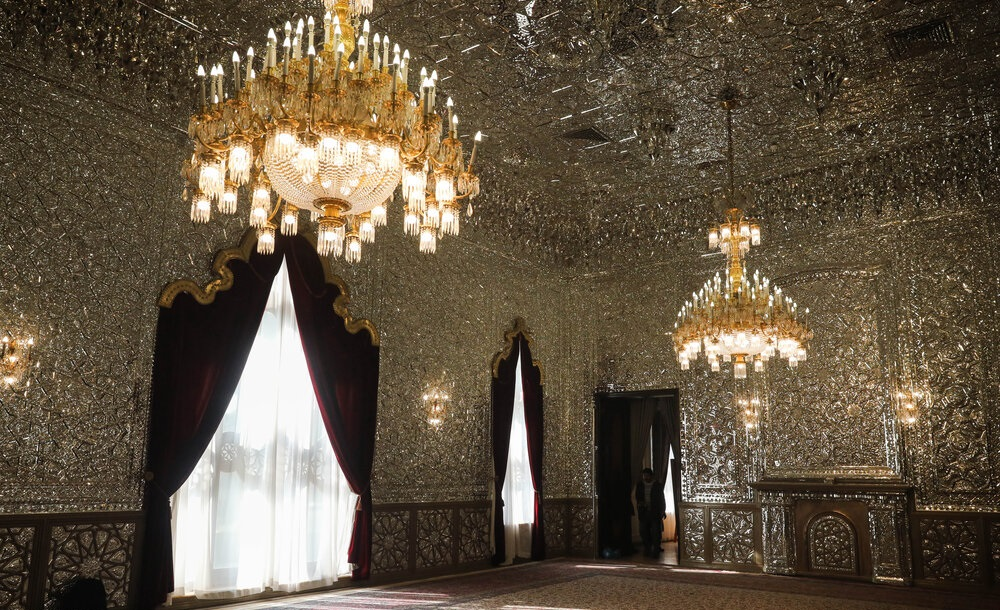

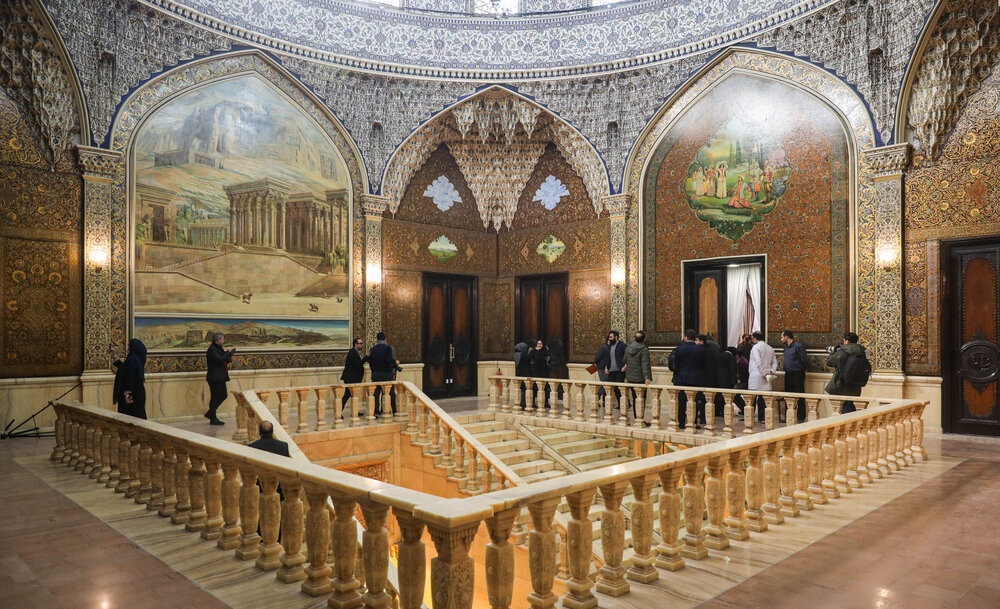

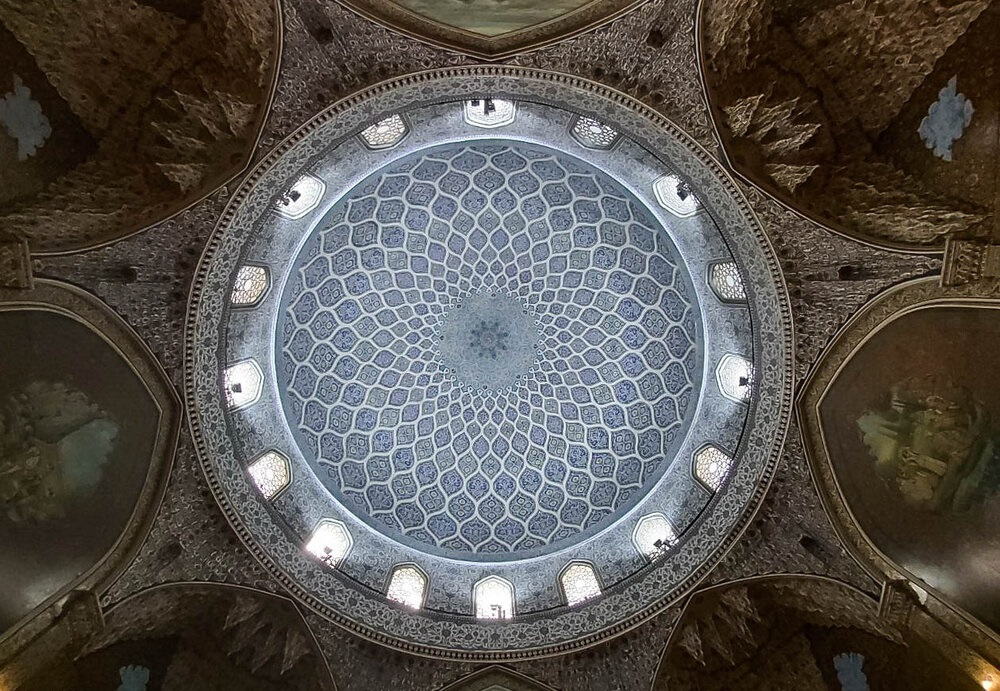

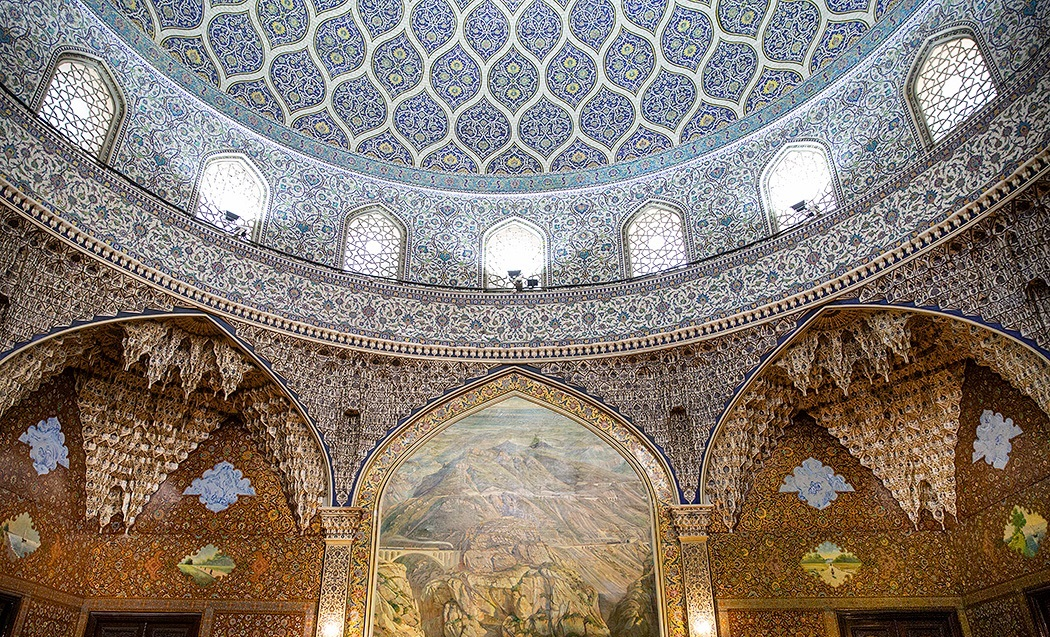

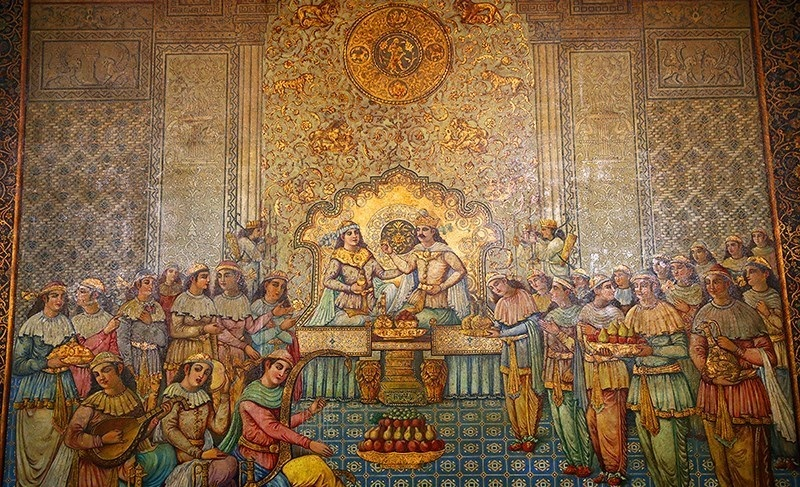

== See also ==
- Ekhtesassi Palace was constructed nearby in the 1930s
