= Mahmoud Reza Pahlavi =

Iranian royal (1926–2001)

- Born: 5 October 1926; Tehran, Imperial State of Iran
- Died: 15 March 2001 (aged 74); Los Angeles, California, U.S.
- Spouse: Mehrdokht Azam Zangeneh (m. 1954; div. 1957) Maryam Eghbal (m. 1964, divorced)
- House: Pahlavi
- Father: Reza Shah
- Mother: Esmat Dowlatshahi

Mahmoud Reza Pahlavi (Persian: محمودرضا پهلوی; 5 October 1926 – 15 March 2001) was a member of Iran's Pahlavi dynasty. He was a son of Reza Shah and a half-brother of Mohammad Reza Pahlavi.

== Biography ==
Pahlavi was born on 5 October 1926 as the third child of Reza Shah and Esmat Dowlatshahi. He received primary education in Iran and then went to Switzerland for secondary education. He enrolled in Tehran's military school but following his father's abdication in 1941 he moved with him to South Africa. After his father's death, he temporarily returned to Iran before moving to the United States to study business and industrial management at the University of California and University of Michigan.

Upon his return to Iran, he married Mehrdokht Azam Zangeneh (daughter of Colonel Yadu’llah Khan Azam Zanganeh, sometime Air ADC to the Shah), in 1954 but the couple divorced after three years. In 1964, he married Maryam Eghbal, the 18-year-old daughter of Manouchehr Eghbal. This marriage also ended in divorce and Eghbal later married Pahlavi's nephew Shahriar Shafiq.

Mahmoud Reza Pahlavi had activities in the agricultural sector and rural development in Iran during the Pahlavi era. His relations with his half-brother and the Shah, Mohammed Reza Pahlavi, became strained due to his involvement in opium trafficking business. Thus, he was banned from participating in royal events by the Shah.

After the Iranian Revolution, Mahmoud Reza Pahlavi moved to the United States. In May 1992, he was arrested in Beverly Hills due to allegations of possessing and selling opium. He died on 15 March 2001 at the age of 74.
