= Ahmad Reza Pahlavi =

Iranian prince (1925–1981)

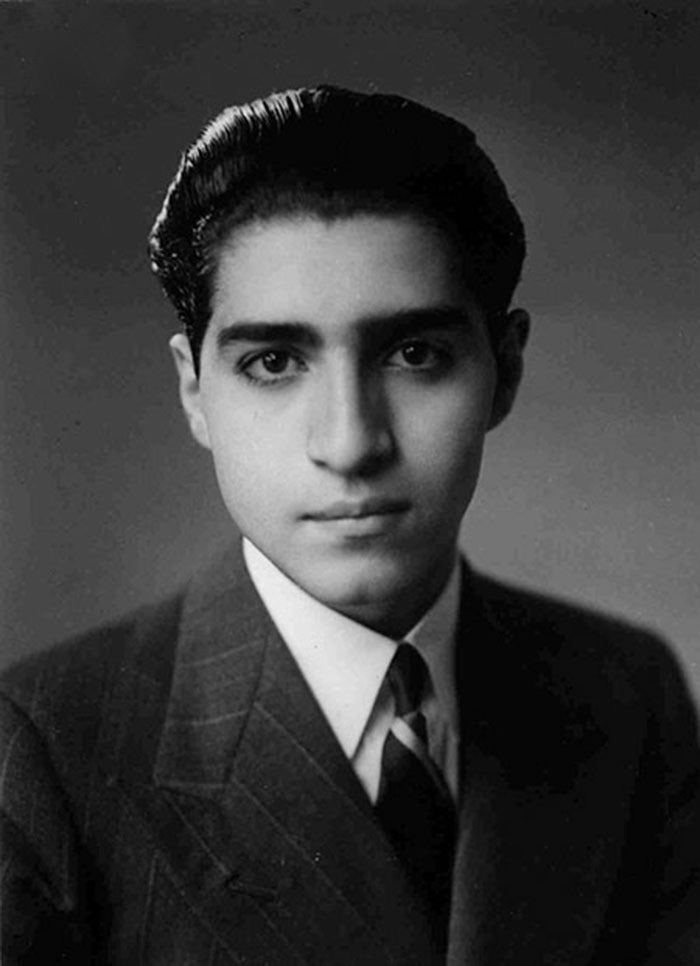
- Prince Ahmad Reza in 1947
- Born: 27 September 1925; Tehran, Sublime State of Iran
- Died: 1981 (aged 55–56); France
- Burial: Petit-Saconnex Cemetery, Geneva, Switzerland
- Spouse: Simintaj Bahrami (m. 1946; div. 1954) Rosa Bozorgnia (m. 1958)
- Issue: Shahrokh Pahlavi; Shahla Pahlavi; Shahin Pahlavi; Shahrnaz Pahlavi; Parinaz Pahlavi
- House: Pahlavi
- Father: Reza Shah
- Mother: Esmat Dowlatshahi

Ahmad Reza Pahlavi (Persian: احمدرضا پهلوی; 27 September 1925 – 1981) was an Iranian prince of the Pahlavi dynasty. He was a son of Reza Shah and a half-brother of Mohammad Reza Pahlavi.

== Biography ==
Ahmad Reza Pahlavi was born on 27 September 1925. He received primary education in Iran and then went to Switzerland for secondary education. He enrolled in Tehran's military school but following his father's abdication in 1941 he moved with him to South Africa. Three years later, he went to Beirut to continue his education and following his father's death he returned to Iran.

Upon his return to Iran in 1946, he married Simintaj Bahrami, the daughter of Hossein-Khan Bahrami, a physician and politician known for his feud with Hassan Modarres. The couple had two children, Shahrokh (born 1947) and Shahla (born 1948), before divorcing in 1954. In 1958, he married Rosa Bozorgnia, the daughter of writer, poet and politician Mohammad Bozorgnia (known under the pen name "Danesh"). The couple had three children: Shahin, Shahrnaz, and Parinaz.

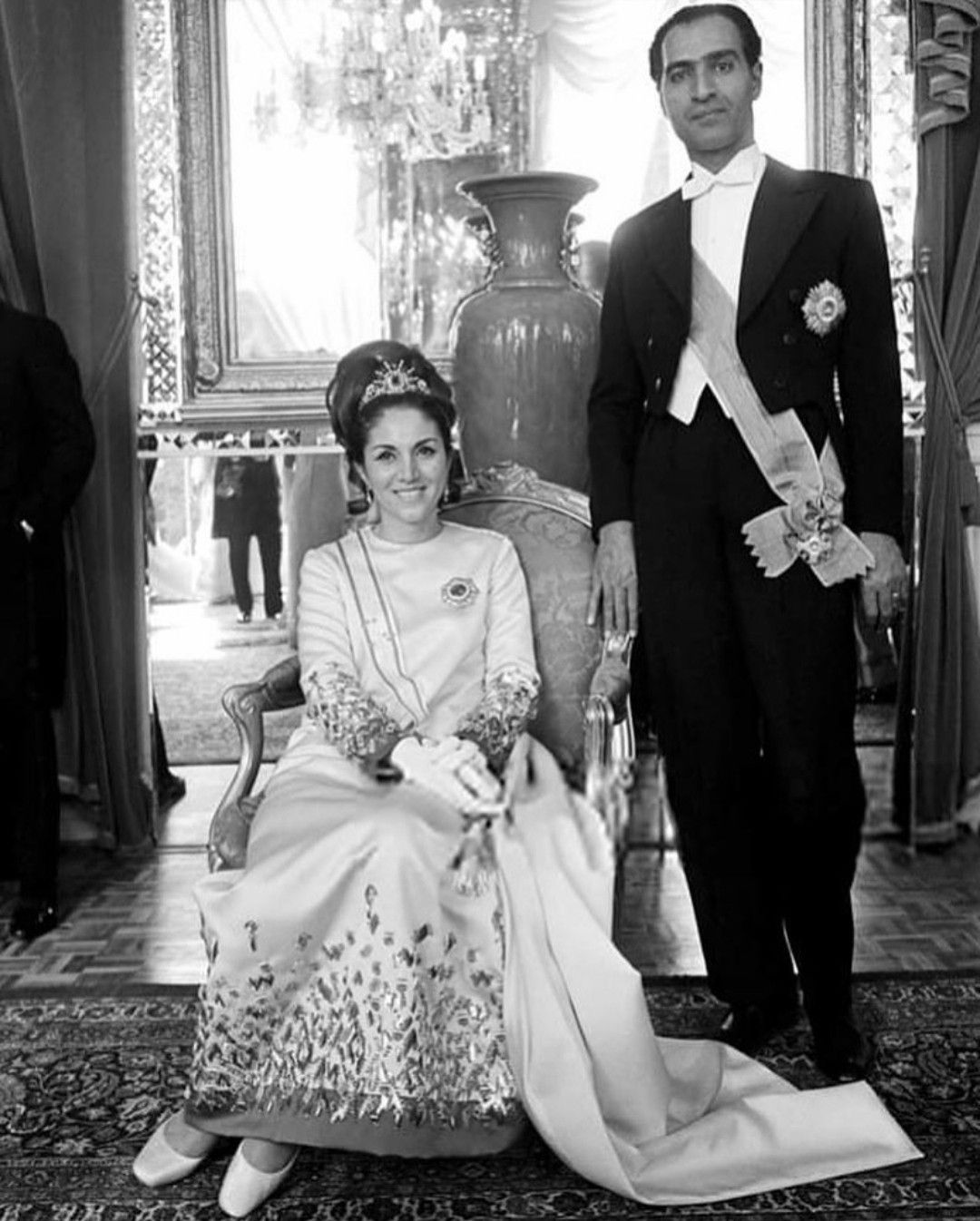
Prince Ahmad Reza and Rosa Bozorgnia on their wedding day in Tehran, 1958

Ahmad Reza was not active in economical, political or social arenas and rarely appeared in court. His residence on the north side of the Sa'dabad Complex and near the gate of Darband was built during his father's reign. Unlike other structures within the Sa'dabad Complex, which have more prominent architecture both in the facade and interior, it is a simple building with two floors and a private garage and lacks special architectural decorations. Based on the historical documents in the Sa'dabad Documentation Center, it seems that Ahmad Reza lived a distant and somewhat isolated life in this building compared to other members of the Pahlavi family.

In the first years after the Iranian Revolution, the residence was handed over to government and presidential institutions and after renovation, part of it was turned into a library and a collection of books from the General Directorate of Museums, the Sa'dabad Complex and various offices of the Cultural Heritage Organization were transferred there. Another part of the building on the east side was given to the Cultural Heritage News Agency for some time, but shortly after the transfer of this news agency to Niavaran Palace, the building changed its use again. The Cultural Heritage Guard is located in this building.

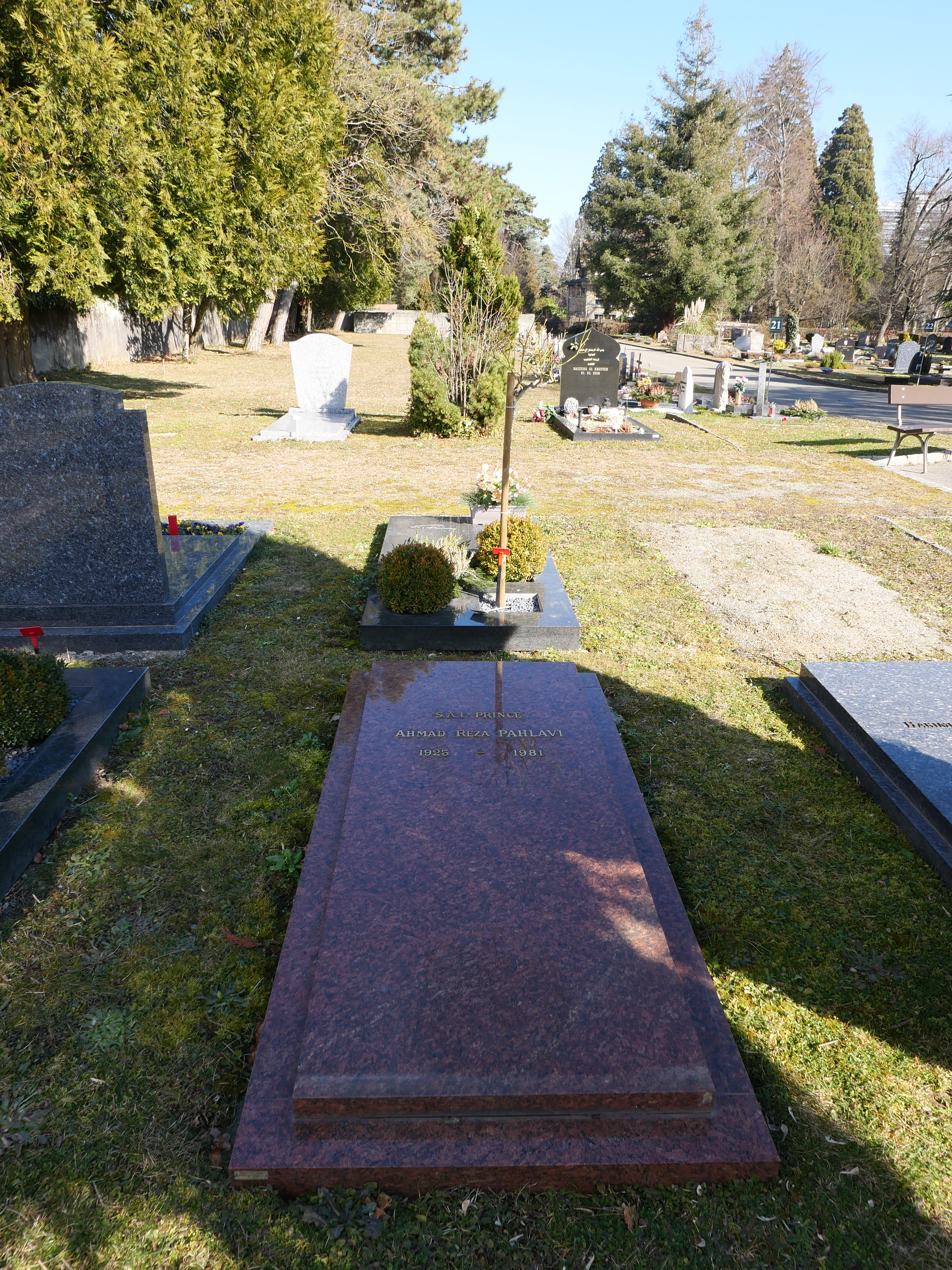
The grave of Prince Ahmad Reza at the Petit-Saconnex Cemetery in Geneva, Switzerland

Declassified government documents indicate that he underwent psychotherapy in England between June and July 1963 due to anxiety. After the Iranian Revolution, he and his family left Iran. He died in 1981 after suffering from leukemia.
