= Bijan Assem =

Iranian Air Force Commander

- Born: 1944; Shiraz, Iran
- Allegiance: Imperial Air Force; Islamic Republic of Iran Air Force
- Branch: Imperial Iranian Air Force, Iran Air Force
- Service years: 1963–1988
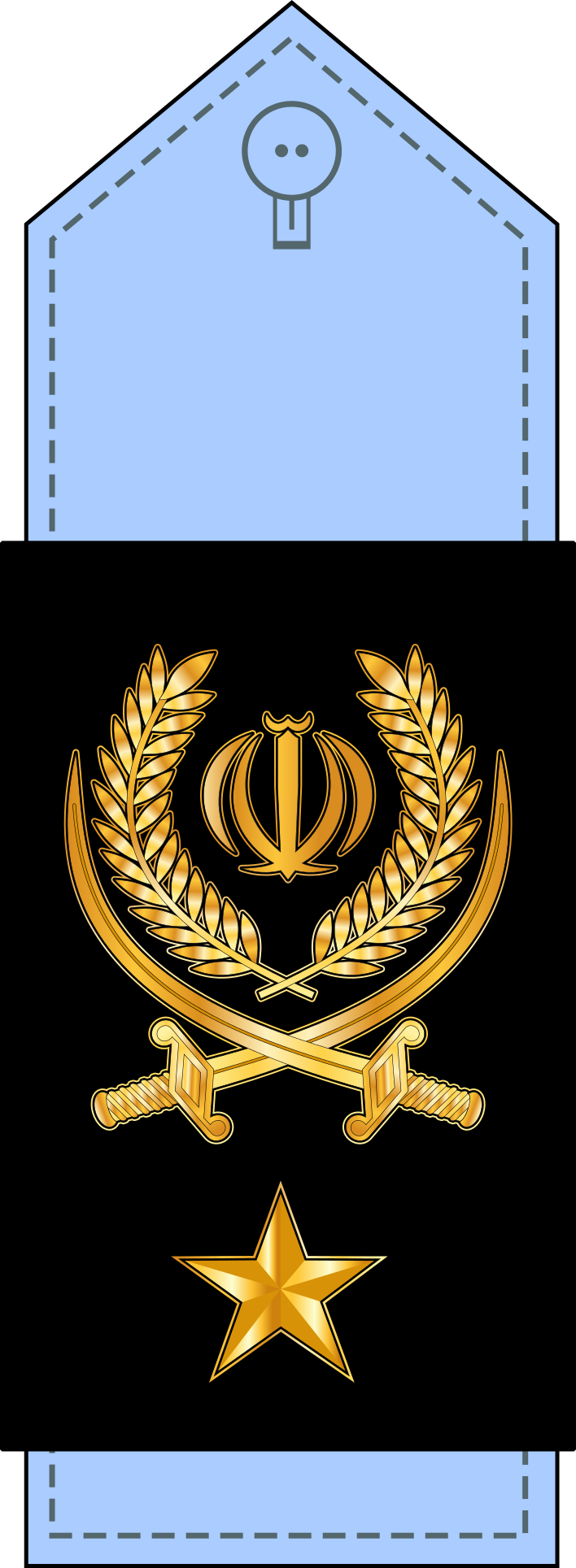
- Rank: Brigadier General
- Conflicts: Dhofar Rebellion Iran–Iraq War (Operation Kaman 99, Attack on H3, Operation Scorch Sword)

Brigadier General Bijan Assem (Persian: بیژن عاصم; born 1944) was an acclaimed Iranian َAir Force commander and a national hero serving for the full duration of the Iran-Iraq War. His record qualifies him as an ace and one of the most successful commander of that conflict. He served the IIAF (1963–1979), and stayed on to serve in the IRIAF(1980–1988) when it was somewhat dangerous for high-ranked officers and pilots to continue their military service.

== Education ==
- University of Tehran, BSME.
- Imperial Iranian Air Force Academy
- RAF: Special Training
- USAF: Special Training

== Career ==
- TAB1 - Mehrabad International Airport
- TAB2 - Tabriz International Airport
- TAB3 - Shahrokhi Air Base
- TAB4 - Dezful Vahdati Air Base
- TAB5 - Omidiyeh Air Base
- TAB6 - Bushehr Airport
- TAB7 - Shiraz International Airport
- TAB8 - Khatami Air Base
- TAB11 - Doshan Tappeh Air Base
- TAB12 - Ghale Morghi Air Base

== Missions ==
- Kaman 99
- Operation Scorch Sword
- Morvarid
- Liberation of Khorramshahr
- Attack on H3
- ...
