= Farajollah Baratpour =

Iranian fighter pilot

- فرج‌الله براتپور
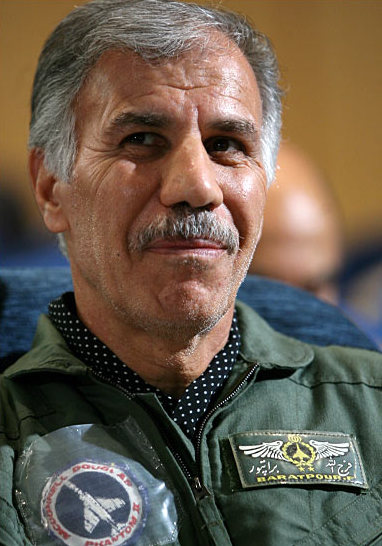
- Born: 30 August 1945 (age 81); Kangavar, Iran
- Military career
- Allegiance: Iran
- Branch: Islamic Republic of Iran Air Force Imperial Iranian Air Force
- Service years: 1967–1997
- Rank: brigadier general
- Known for: commanded the flight squadrons of H-3 airstrike
- Conflicts: Iran–Iraq War
- Awards: Iranian Army Dedication Medal

Farajollah Baratpour (Persian: فرج‌الله براتپور),(born 30 August 1945, in Kangavar, Iran) is a retired Brigadier General and McDonnell Douglas F-4 Phantom II Fighter pilot in the Islamic Republic of Iran Air Force, who was the head of the force's Flight Inspection Department from 1994 to 1998. In 1988, he commanded the flight squadrons of H-3 airstrike. he was the commander of the third group in the operation. he is considered one of the legends of the Iran–Iraq War.

== Biography ==
He was born in 1945 in Kangavar, Kermanshah Province. At the age of 2, he moved to Kermanshah with his family and studied there until his high school diploma. In October 1968, after completing his education in Iran and the United States, he was promoted to the rank of second lieutenant. In October 1978, he went to the United States for management training and returned to Iran 2 months before the Iranian Revolution. In October 1983, he was appointed as the successor to the 6th Bushehr Fighter Base, and in 1983, he went to the General Staff Command School, and then became the commander of Hamadan Airbase in Hamadan for 2 years. He also served as the commander of the Shiraz Air Region for 5 and a half years, and then as the head of the Air Force Flight Inspection Department for 4 and a half years.

== Book ==
His biography, titled Blue Sky, was written by Mohsen Sanjabi and unveiled at a special ceremony.

During the revolution, when the US Air Force asked Farajollah Baratpour to stay and serve in the country, the Iranian pilot said that he would prefer nothing, not even a comfortable and safe life in America, to his country.

== Award ==
He received the Supreme Medal of Dedication from Ali Khamenei on Thursday, February 13, 2025.
