= Aerial refueling =

Procedure in which flying aircraft receive fuel from another aircraft

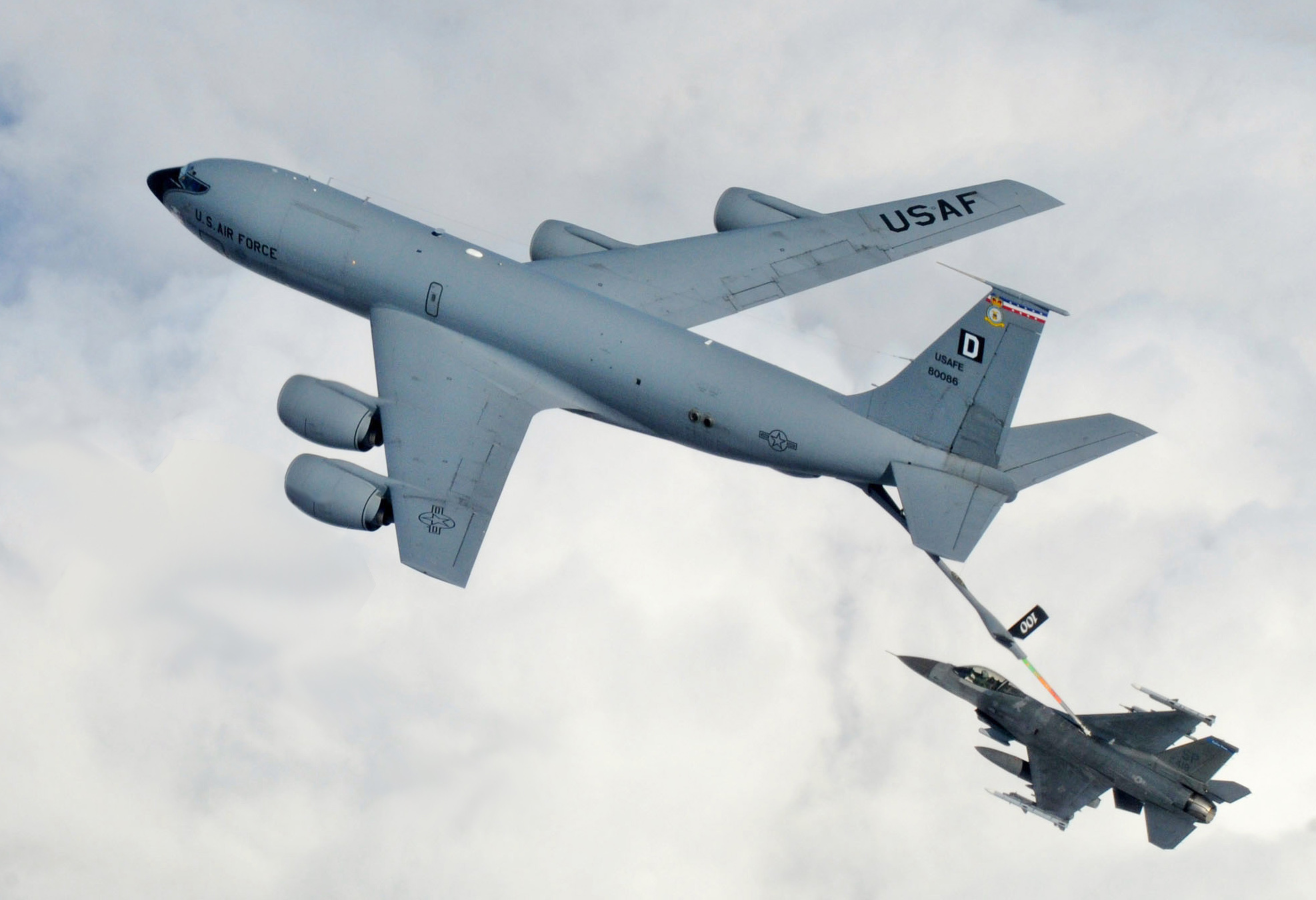
A KC-135 Stratotanker refuels an F-16 Fighting Falcon using a flying boom

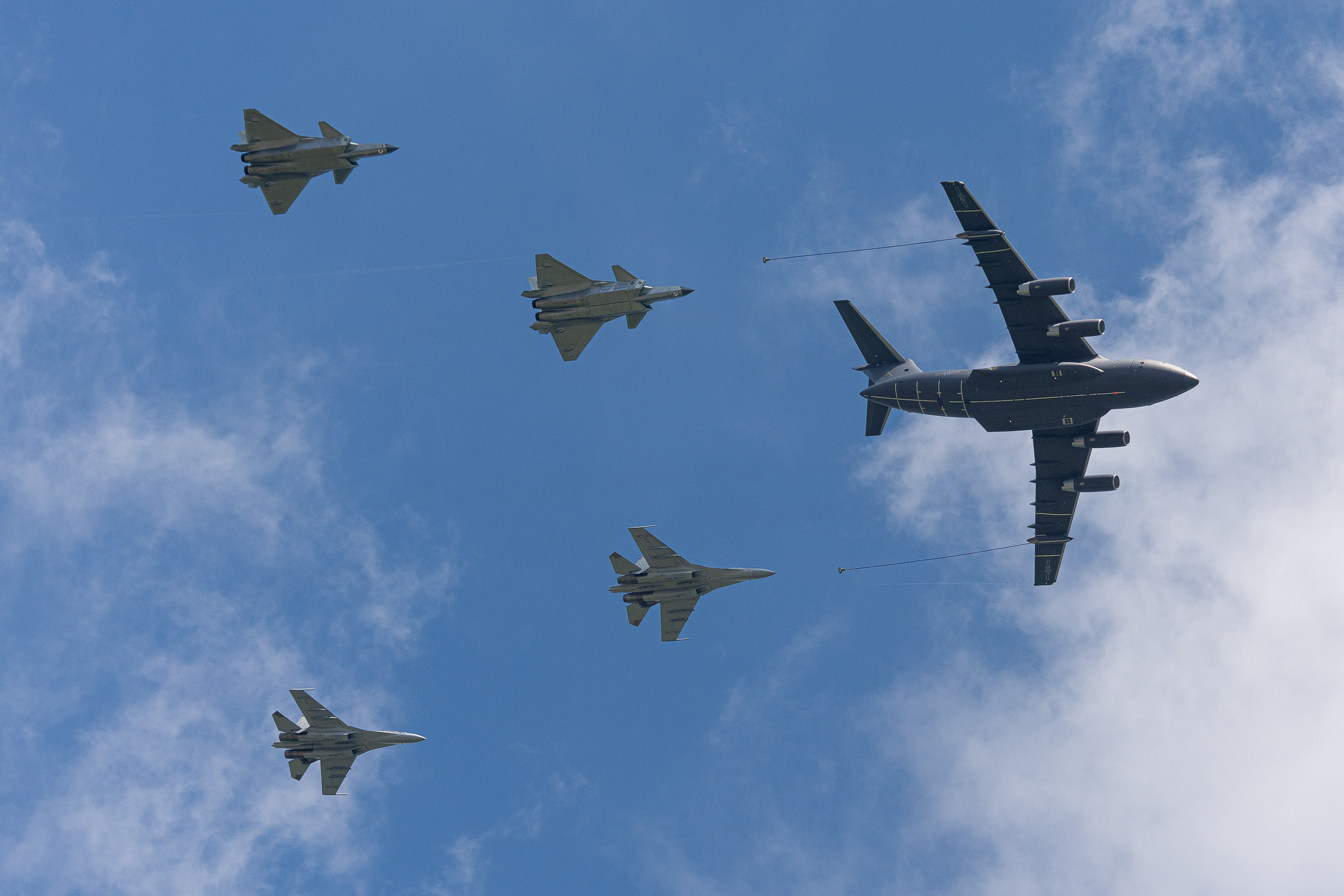
Chinese Chengdu J-20, Shenyang J-16, and Xian YY-20 in an aerial refueling formation

Aerial refueling, also referred to as air refueling, in-flight refueling (IFR), air-to-air refueling (AAR), and tanking, is the process of transferring aviation fuel from one aircraft (the tanker) to another (the receiver) while both aircraft are in flight. (Note: "AAR" can also stand for After Action Review (i.e. debriefing); "IFR" also stands for Instrument Flight Rules.) The two main refueling systems are probe-and-drogue, which is simpler to adapt to existing aircraft, and the flying boom, which offers faster fuel transfer but requires a dedicated boom operator station.

The procedure allows the receiving aircraft to remain airborne longer, extending its range or loiter time. A series of aerial refuelings can give range limited only by crew's physiological needs (like fatigue) and engineering factors such as engine oil consumption. Because the receiver aircraft is topped-off with extra fuel in the air, aerial refueling can allow a takeoff with a greater payload which could be weapons, cargo, or personnel: the maximum takeoff weight is maintained by carrying less fuel and topping up once airborne. Aerial refueling has also been considered as a means to reduce fuel consumption on long-distance flights greater than 3,000 nautical miles (5,600 km; 3,500 mi). Potential fuel savings in the range of 35–40% have been estimated for long-haul flights (including the fuel used during the tanker missions).

Usually, the aircraft providing the fuel is specially designed for the task, although refueling pods may be fitted to existing aircraft designs in the case of "probe-and-drogue" systems. The cost of the refueling equipment on both tanker and receiver aircraft and the specialised aircraft handling of the aircraft to be refuelled (very close "line astern" formation flying) has resulted in the activity only being used in military operations; there are no regular civilian in-flight refueling activities. Originally tried shortly before World War II on a limited scale to extend the range of British civilian transatlantic flying boats, and then employed after World War II on a large scale to extend the range of strategic bombers, aerial refueling since the Vietnam War has been extensively used in large-scale military operations.

== Development history ==
=== Early experiments ===
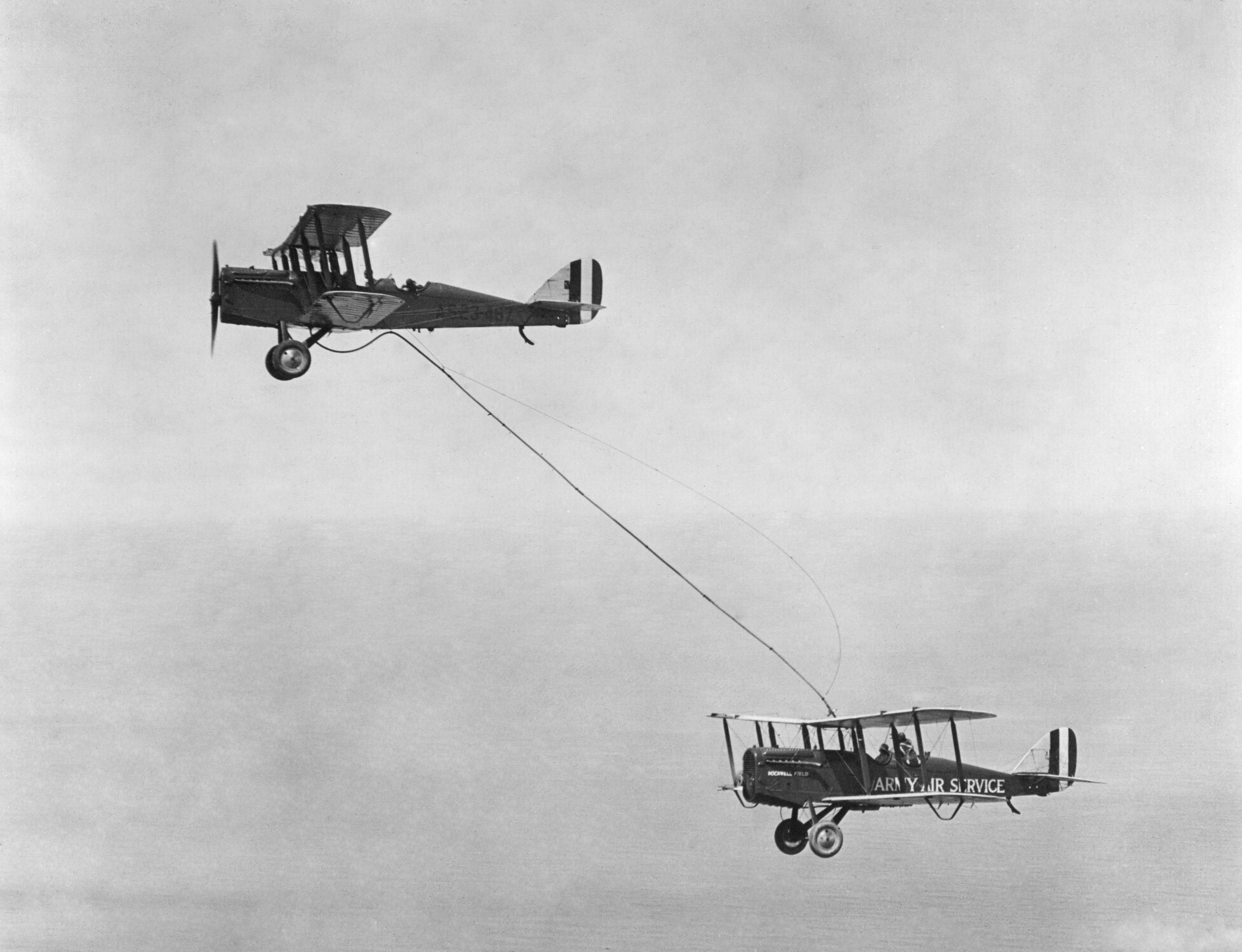
Capt. Lowell Smith and Lt. John P. Richter receiving the first mid-air refueling on 27 June 1923

Some of the earliest experiments in aerial refueling took place in the 1920s; two slow-flying aircraft flew in formation, with a hose run down from a hand-held fuel tank on one aircraft and placed into the usual fuel filler of the other. The first mid-air refueling, based on the development of Alexander P. de Seversky, between two planes occurred on 25 June 1923, between two Airco DH-4B biplanes of the United States Army Air Service. An endurance record was set by three DH-4Bs (a receiver and two tankers) on 27–28 August 1923, in which the receiver airplane remained aloft for more than 37 hours using nine mid-air refuels to transfer 687 US gallons (2,600 L) of aviation gasoline and 38 US gallons (140 L) of engine oil. The same crews demonstrated the utility of the technique on 25 October 1923, when a DH-4 flew from Sumas, Washington, on the Canada–United States border, to Tijuana, Mexico, landing in San Diego, using mid-air refuelings at Eugene, Oregon, and Sacramento, California.

Similar trial demonstrations of mid-air refueling technique took place at the Royal Aircraft Establishment in England and by the Armée de l'Air in France in the same year, but these early experiments were not yet regarded as a practical proposition, and were generally dismissed as stunts.

As the 1920s progressed, greater numbers of aviation enthusiasts vied to set new aerial long-distance records, using inflight air refueling. One such enthusiast, who would revolutionize aerial refueling was Sir Alan Cobham, member of the Royal Flying Corps in World War I, and a pioneer of long-distance aviation. During the 1920s, he made long-distance flights to places as far afield as Africa and Australia and he began experimenting with the possibilities of in-flight refueling to extend the range of flight.

Cobham was one of the founding directors of Airspeed Limited, an aircraft manufacturing company that went on to produce a specially adapted Airspeed Courier that Cobham used for his early experiments with in-flight refueling. This craft was eventually modified by Airspeed to Cobham's specification, for a non-stop flight from London to India, using in-flight refueling to extend the plane's flight duration.

Meanwhile, in 1929, a group of US Army Air Corps fliers, led by then Major Carl Spaatz, set an endurance record of over 150 hours with a Fokker C-2A named the Question Mark over Los Angeles. Between 11 June and 4 July 1930, the brothers John, Kenneth, Albert, and Walter Hunter set a new record of 553 hours 40 minutes over Chicago using two Stinson SM-1 Detroiters as refueler and receiver. Aerial refueling remained a very dangerous process until 1935, when brothers Fred and Al Key demonstrated a spill-free refueling nozzle, designed by A. D. Hunter. They exceeded the Hunters' record by nearly 100 hours in a Curtiss Robin monoplane, staying aloft for more than 27 days.

The US was mainly concerned about transatlantic flights for faster postal service between Europe and America. In 1931 W. Irving Glover, the second assistant postmaster, wrote an extensive article for Popular Mechanics concerning the challenges and the need for such a regular service. In his article he even mentioned the use of aerial refueling after takeoff as a possible solution.

At Le Bourget Airport near Paris, the Aéro-Club de France and the 34th Aviation Regiment of the French Air Force were able to demonstrate passing fuel between machines at the annual aviation fete at Vincennes in 1928. The UK's Royal Aircraft Establishment was also running mid-air refueling trials, with the aim to use this technique to extend the range of the long-distance flying boats that serviced the British Empire. By 1931 they had demonstrated refueling between two Vickers Virginias, with fuel flow controlled by an automatic valve on the hose which would cut off if contact was lost.

Royal Air Force officer Richard Atcherley had observed the dangerous aerial-refueling techniques in use at barnstorming events in the US and determined to create a workable system. While posted to the Middle East he developed and patented his 'crossover' system in 1934, in which the tanker trailed a large hooked line that would reel in a similar dropped line from the receiver, allowing the refueling to commence. In 1935, Cobham sold off the airline Cobham Air Routes Ltd to Olley Air Service and turned to the development of inflight refueling, founding the company Flight Refuelling Ltd. Atcherly's system was bought up by Cobham's company, and with some refinement and continuous improvement through the late '30s, it became the first practical refueling system.

==== Grappled-line looped-hose ====
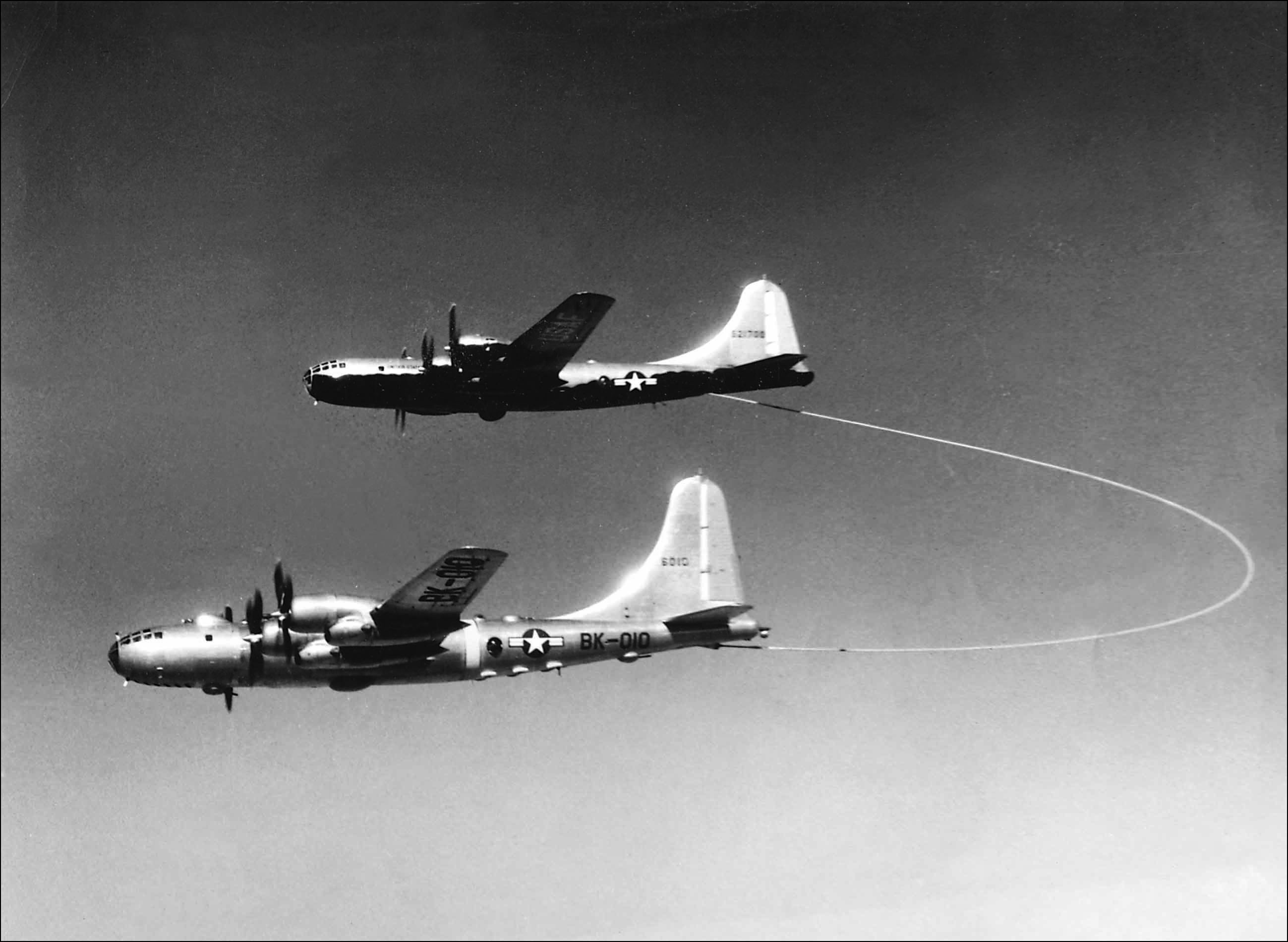
The US Air Force Boeing B-50 Superfortress Lucky Lady II being refueled by grappled-line looped-hose during the first non-stop circumnavigation of the world by air (1949)

Sir Alan Cobham's grappled-line looped-hose air-to-air refueling system borrowed from techniques patented by David Nicolson and John Lord, and was publicly demonstrated for the first time in 1935. In the system the receiver aircraft, at one time an Airspeed Courier, trailed a steel cable which was then grappled by a line shot from the tanker, a Handley Page Type W10. The line was then drawn back into the tanker where the receiver's cable was connected to the refueling hose. The receiver could then haul back in its cable bringing the hose to it. Once the hose was connected, the tanker climbed sufficiently above the receiver aircraft to allow the fuel to flow under gravity.

When Cobham was developing his system, he saw the need as purely for long-range transoceanic commercial aircraft flights, but modern aerial refueling is used exclusively by military aircraft.

In 1934, Cobham had founded Flight Refuelling Ltd (FRL) and by 1938 had used its looped-hose system to refuel aircraft as large as the Short Empire flying boat Cambria from an Armstrong Whitworth AW.23. Handley Page Harrows were used in the 1939 trials to perform aerial refueling of the Empire flying boats for regular transatlantic crossings. From 5 August to 1 October 1939, sixteen crossings of the Atlantic were made by Empire flying boats, with fifteen crossings using FRL's aerial refueling system. After the sixteen crossings further trials were suspended due to the outbreak of World War II.

During the closing months of World War II, it had been intended that Tiger Force's Lancaster and Lincoln bombers would be in-flight refueled by converted Halifax tanker aircraft, fitted with the FRL's looped-hose units, in operations against the Japanese homelands, but the war ended before the aircraft could be deployed. After the war ended, the USAF bought a small number of FRL looped-hose units and fitted a number of B-29s as tankers to refuel specially equipped B-29s and later B-50s. The USAF made only one major change in the system used by the RAF. The USAF version had auto-coupling of the refueling nozzle, where the leader line with the refueling hose is pulled to the receiver aircraft and a refueling receptacle on the belly of the aircraft, allowing high-altitude air-to-air refueling and doing away with the aircraft having to fly to a lower altitude to be depressurized so a crew member could manually do the coupling.

This air-to-air refueling system was used by the B-50 Superfortress Lucky Lady II of the 43rd Bomb Wing to make its famous first non-stop around-the-world flight in 1949. From 26 February to 3 March 1949, Lucky Lady II flew non-stop around the world in 94 hours and 1 minute, a feat made possible by four aerial refuelings from four pairs of KB-29M tankers of the 43d ARS. Before the mission, crews of the 43rd had experienced only a single operational air refueling contact. The flight started and ended at Carswell Air Force Base in Fort Worth, Texas with the refuelings accomplished over the Azores, Saudi Arabia, the Pacific Ocean near Guam, and between Hawaii and the West Coast.

==== Probe-and-drogue system ====
Cobham's company FRL (now part of Cobham plc) soon realized that their looped-hose system left much to be desired and began work on an improved system that is now commonly called the probe-and-drogue air-to-air refueling system and today is one of the two systems chosen by air forces for air-to-air refueling, the other being the flying-boom system. In post-war trials the RAF used a modified Lancaster tanker employing the much improved probe-and-drogue system, with a modified Gloster Meteor F.3 jet fighter, serial EE397, fitted with a nose-mounted probe. On 7 August 1949, the Meteor flown by FRL test pilot Pat Hornidge took off from Tarrant Rushton and remained airborne for 12 hours and 3 minutes, receiving 2,352 imperial gallons (10,690 L) of fuel in ten refuelings from a Lancaster tanker. Hornidge flew an overall distance of 3,600 mi (5,800 km), achieving a new jet endurance record.

Modern specialized tanker aircraft have equipment specially designed for the task of offloading fuel to the receiver aircraft, based on drogue and probe, even at the higher speeds modern jet aircraft typically need to remain airborne.

In January 1948, General Carl Spaatz, then the first Chief of Staff of the new United States Air Force, made aerial refueling a top priority of the service. In March 1948, the USAF purchased two sets of FRL's looped-hose in-flight refueling equipment, which had been in practical use with British Overseas Airways Corporation (BOAC) since 1946, and manufacturing rights to the system. FRL also provided a year of technical assistance. The sets were immediately installed in two Boeing B-29 Superfortresses, with plans to equip 80 B-29s.

Flight testing began in May 1948 at Wright-Patterson Air Force Base, Ohio, and was so successful that in June orders went out to equip all new B-50s and subsequent bombers with receiving equipment. Two dedicated air refueling units were formed on 30 June 1948: the 43d Air Refueling Squadron at Davis-Monthan Air Force Base, Arizona, and the 509th Air Refueling Squadron at Walker Air Force Base, New Mexico. The first ARS aircraft used FRL's looped-hose refueling system, but testing with a boom system followed quickly in the autumn of 1948.

The first use of aerial refueling in combat took place during the Korean War, involving F-84 fighter-bombers flying missions from Japanese airfields, due to Chinese-North Korean forces overrunning many of the bases for jet aircraft in South Korea, refueling from converted B-29s using the drogue-and-probe in-flight refueling system with the probe located in one of the F-84's wing-tip fuel tanks.

== Systems ==
=== Flying boom ===
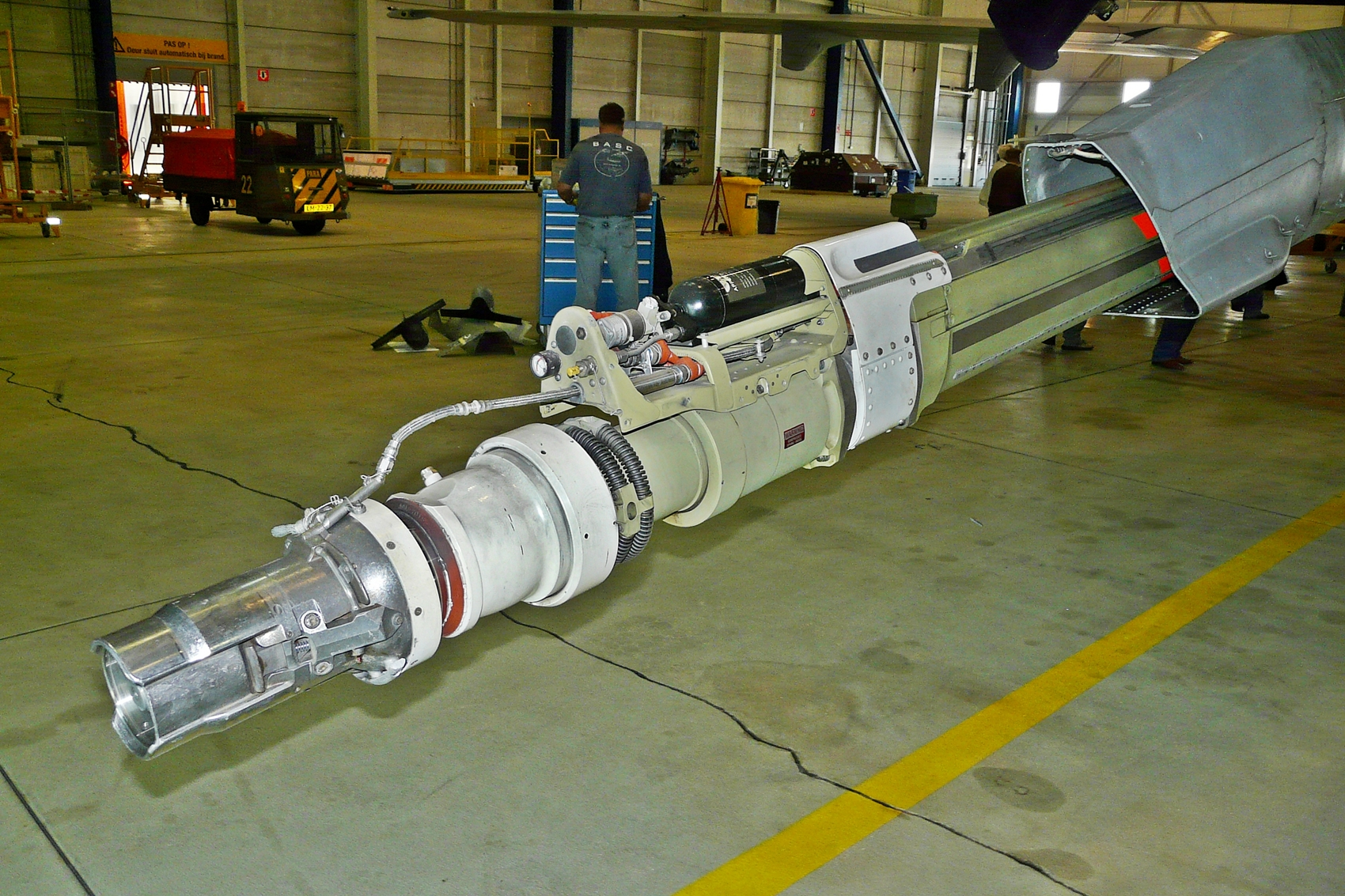
Dutch Air Force KDC-10 refueling boom

The flying boom is a rigid, telescoping tube with movable flight control surfaces that a boom operator on the tanker aircraft extends and inserts into a receptacle on the receiving aircraft. All boom-equipped tankers (e.g. KC-135 Stratotanker, KC-10 Extender, KC-46 Pegasus) have a single boom and can refuel one aircraft at a time with this mechanism.

==== History ====
In the late 1940s, General Curtis LeMay, commander of the Strategic Air Command (SAC), asked Boeing to develop a refueling system that could transfer fuel at a higher rate than had been possible with earlier systems using flexible hoses, resulting in the flying boom system. The B-29 was the first to employ the boom, and between 1950 and 1951, 116 original B-29s, designated KB-29Ps, were converted at the Boeing plant at Renton, Washington. Boeing went on to develop the world's first production aerial tanker, the KC-97 Stratofreighter, a piston-engined Boeing Stratocruiser (USAF designation C-97 Stratofreighter) with a Boeing-developed flying boom and extra kerosene (jet fuel) tanks feeding the boom. The Stratocruiser airliner itself was developed from the B-29 bomber after World War II. In the KC-97, the mixed gasoline/kerosene fuel system was clearly not desirable and it was obvious that a jet-powered tanker aircraft would be the next development, having a single type of fuel for both its own engines and for passing to receiver aircraft. The 230 mph (370 km/h) cruise speed of the slower, piston-engined KC-97 was also a serious issue, as using it as an aerial tanker forced the newer jet-powered military aircraft to slow down to mate with the tanker's boom, a highly serious issue with the newer supersonic aircraft coming into service at that time, which could force such receiving aircraft in some situations to slow down enough to approach their stall speed during the approach to the tanker. It was no surprise that, after the KC-97, Boeing began receiving contracts from the USAF to build jet tankers based on the Boeing 367-80 (Dash-80) airframe. The result was the Boeing KC-135 Stratotanker, of which 732 were built.

The flying boom is attached to the rear of the tanker aircraft. The attachment is gimballed, allowing the boom to move with the receiver aircraft. The boom contains a rigid pipe to transfer fuel. The fuel pipe ends in a nozzle with a flexible ball joint. The nozzle mates to the "receptacle" in the receiver aircraft during fuel transfer. A poppet valve in the end of the nozzle prevents fuel from exiting the tube until the nozzle properly mates with the receiver's refueling receptacle. Once properly mated, toggles in the receptacle engage the nozzle, holding it locked during fuel transfer.

The "flying" boom is so named because flight control surfaces, small movable airfoils that are often in a V-tail configuration, are used to move the boom by creating aerodynamic forces. They are actuated hydraulically and controlled by the boom operator using a control stick. The boom operator also telescopes the boom to make the connection with the receiver's receptacle.

To complete an aerial refueling, the tanker and receiver aircraft rendezvous, flying in formation. The receiver moves to a position behind the tanker, within safe limits of travel for the boom, aided by director lights or directions radioed by the boom operator. Once in position, the operator extends the boom to make contact with the receiver aircraft. Once in contact, fuel is pumped through the boom into the receiver aircraft.

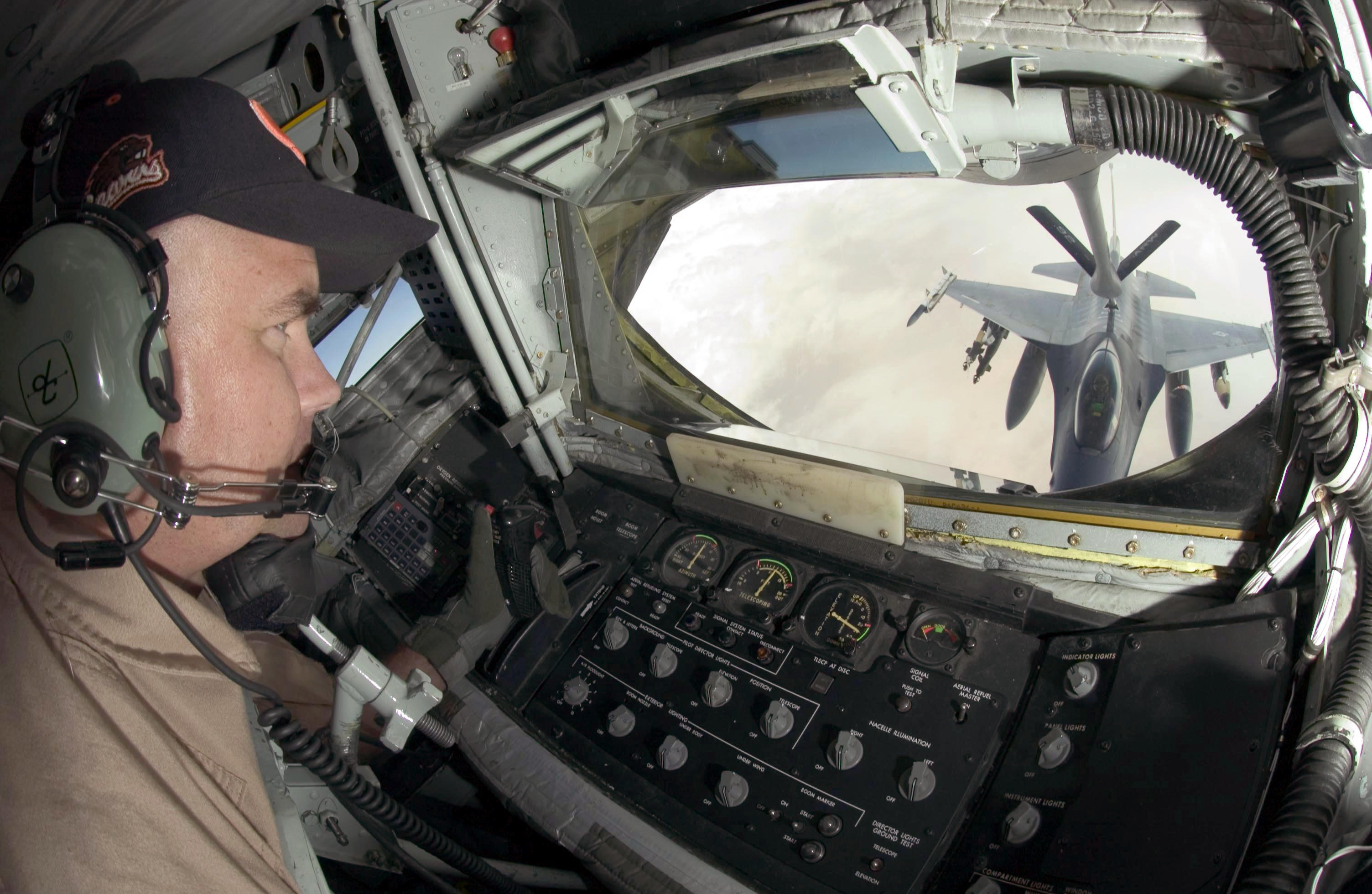
USAF KC-135 boom operator view from the boom pod.

While in contact, the receiver pilot must continue to fly within the "air refueling envelope", the area in which contact with the boom is safe. Moving outside of this envelope can damage the boom or lead to mid-air collision, for example the 1966 Palomares B-52 crash. If the receiving aircraft approaches the outer limits of the envelope, the boom operator will command the receiver pilot to correct their position and disconnect the boom if necessary.

When the desired amount of fuel has been transferred, the two aircraft disconnect and the receiver aircraft departs the formation. When not in use, the boom is stored flush with the bottom of the tanker's fuselage to minimize drag.

In the KC-97 and KC-135 the boom operator lies prone, while the operator is seated in the KC-10, all viewing operations through a window at the tail. The KC-46 seats two operators at the front of the aircraft viewing camera video on 3D screens.

The US Air Force fixed-wing aircraft use the flying boom system, along with Australia (KC-30A), the Netherlands (KDC-10), Israel (modified Boeing 707), Japan (KC-767), Turkey (KC-135Rs), and Iran (Boeing 707 and 747). The system allows higher fuel flow rates (up to 1,000 US gallons (3,800 L) / 6,500 pounds (2,900 kg) per minute for the KC-135, but does require a boom operator, and can only refuel one aircraft at a time.

=== Probe-and-drogue ===
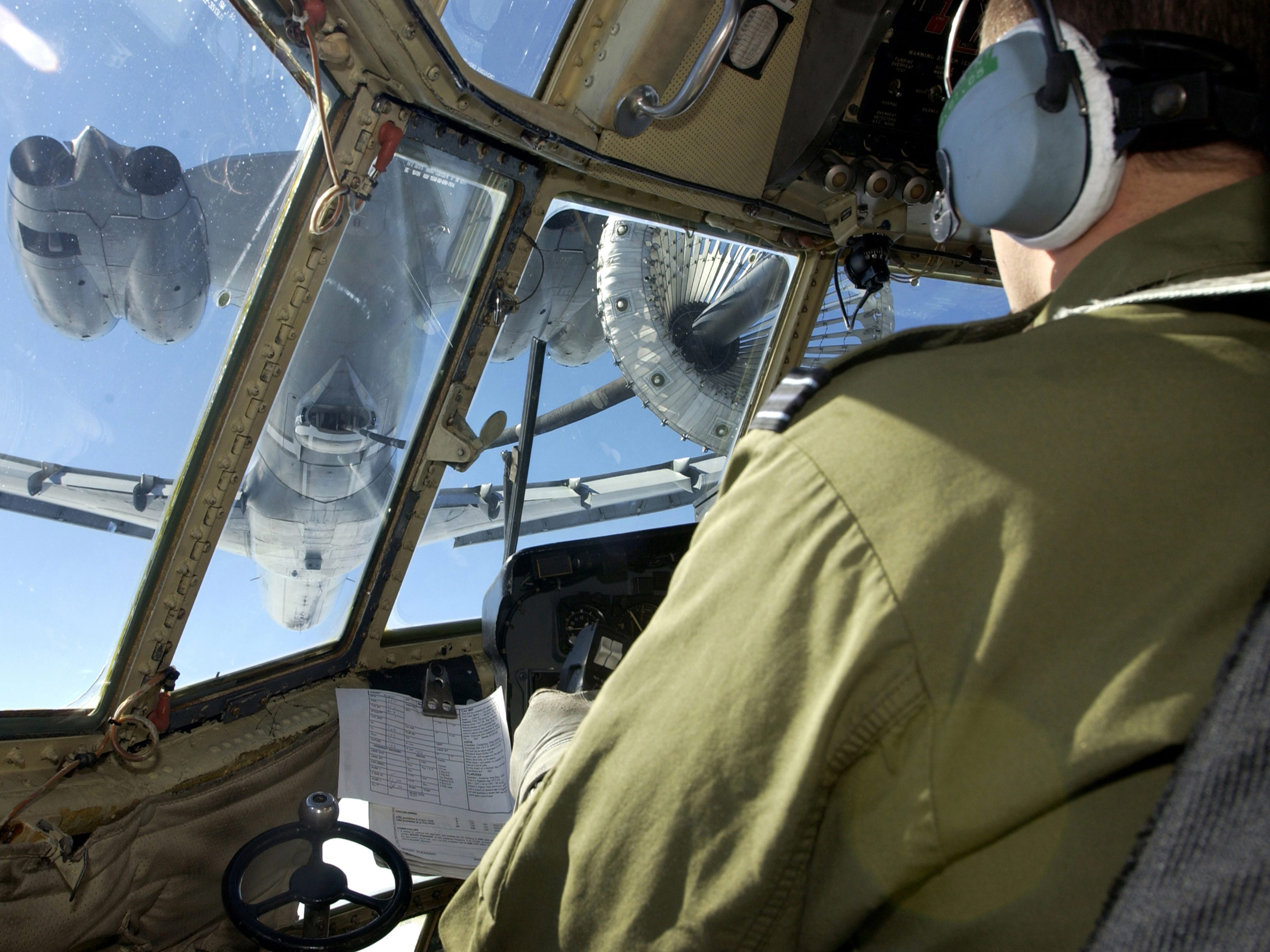
Using a probe-and-drogue, a Royal Air Force C-130K Hercules crew practice refueling from an RAF VC10 tanker over the Falkland Islands, 2005

The probe-and-drogue refueling method employs a flexible hose that trails from the tanker aircraft. The drogue (or para-drogue), sometimes called a basket, is a fitting resembling a shuttlecock, attached at its narrow end (like the "cork" nose of a shuttlecock) with a valve to a flexible hose. The drogue stabilizes the hose in flight and provides a funnel to aid insertion of the receiver aircraft probe into the hose. The hose connects to a hose drum unit (HDU). When not in use, the hose/drogue is reeled completely into the HDU.

The receiver has a probe, which is a rigid, protruding or pivoted retractable arm placed on the aircraft's nose or fuselage to make the connection. Modern probes are usually retractable, for reduced drag on high-speed aircraft.

At the end of the probe is a valve that is closed until it mates with the drogue's forward internal receptacle, after which it opens and allows fuel to pass from tanker to receiver. The valves in the probe and drogue that are most commonly used are to a NATO standard and were originally developed by the company Flight Refuelling Limited in the UK and deployed in the late 1940s and 1950s. This standardization enables drogue-equipped tanker aircraft from many nations to refuel probe-equipped aircraft from other nations.

The NATO-standard probe system incorporates shear rivets that attach the refueling valve to the end of the probe. This is so that if a large side or vertical load develops while in contact with the drogue, the rivets shear and the fuel valve breaks off, rather than the probe or receiver aircraft suffering structural damage. A so-called "broken probe" (actually a broken fuel valve, as described above) may happen if poor flying technique is used by the receiver pilot, or in turbulence. Sometimes the valve is retained in the tanker drogue and prevents further refueling from that drogue until removed during ground maintenance.

==== Buddy store ====
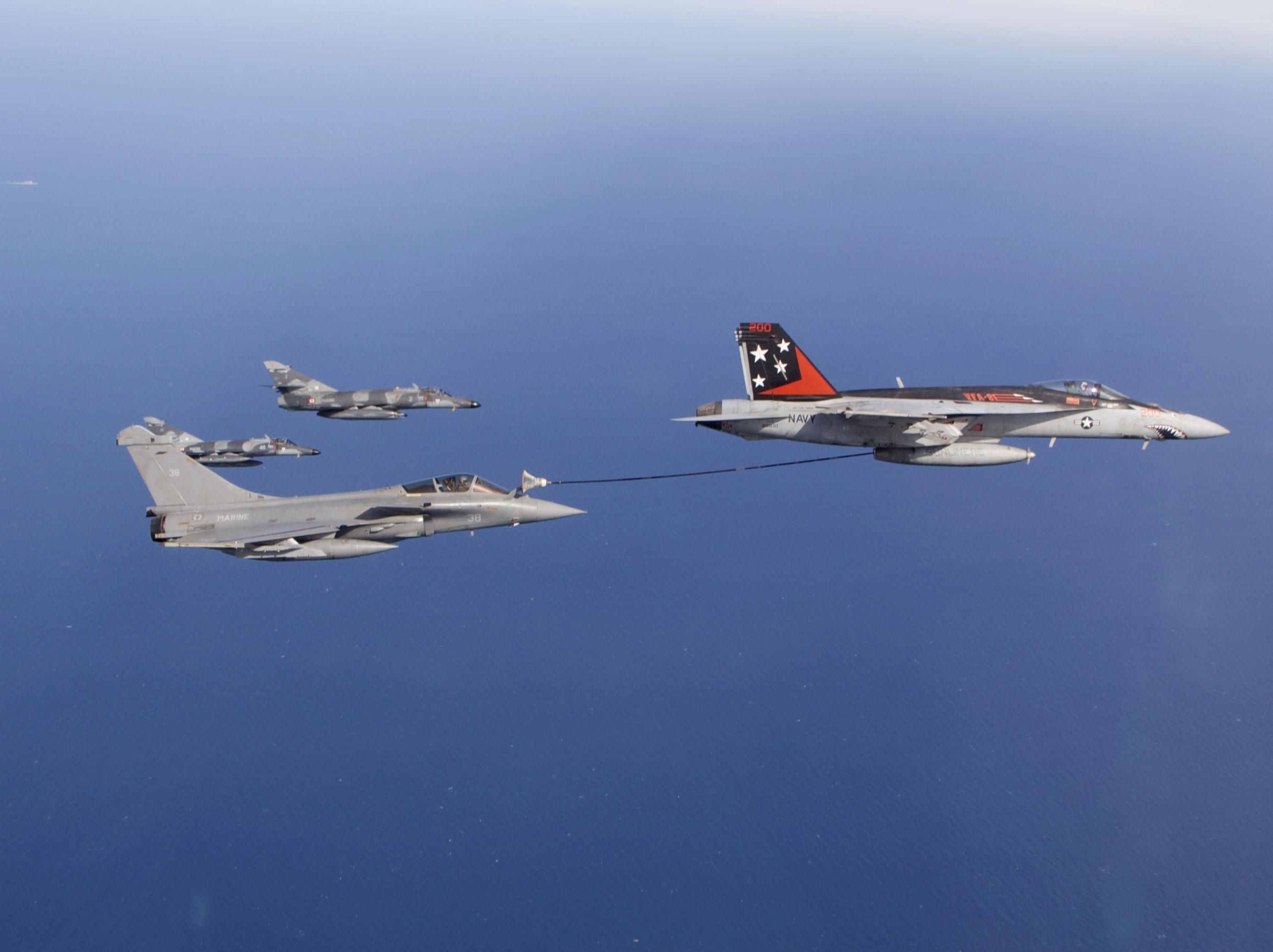
An F/A-18E Super Hornet of the US Navy acts as a buddy tanker for a Rafale of the French Navy over the Arabian Sea, 2015

A "buddy store" or "buddy pod" is an external pod loaded on an aircraft hardpoint that contains a hose and drogue system (HDU). Buddy stores allow fighter / bomber aircraft to be reconfigured for "buddy tanking" other aircraft. This allows an air combat force without dedicated/specialized tanker support (for instance, a carrier air wing) to extend the range of its strike aircraft. In other cases, using the buddy store method allows a carrier-based aircraft to take-off with a heavier than usual weapon load, but less fuel than might be necessary for its tasking. The aircraft would then be topped-up with fuel from an HDU-equipped "buddy" tanker, a method previously used by the Royal Navy in operating its Supermarine Scimitar, de Havilland Sea Vixen, and Blackburn Buccaneers; in the Buccaneer's case using a bomb-bay-mounted tank and HDU.

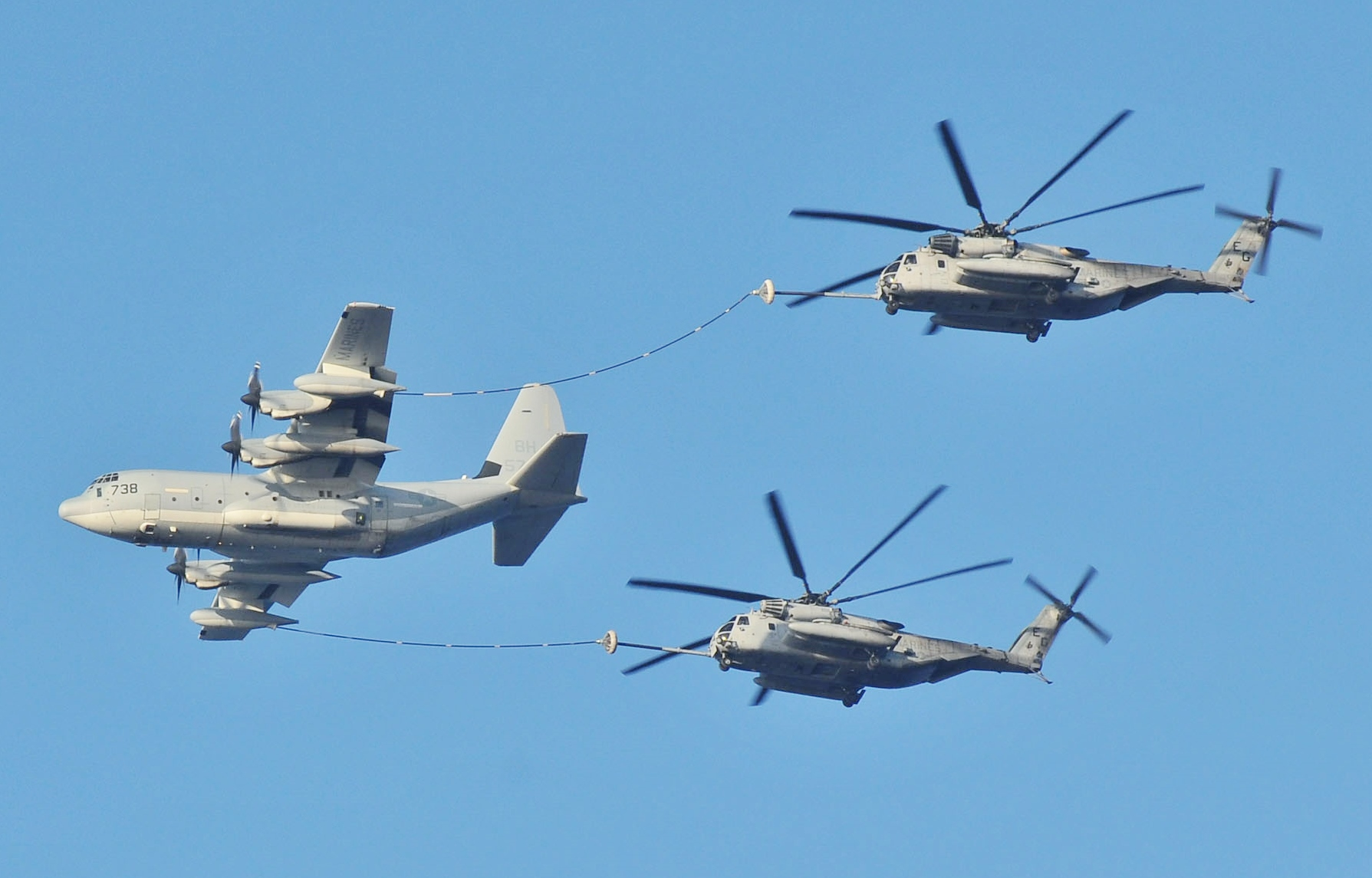
A USMC KC-130 Hercules refuels a pair of USMC CH-53E Super Stallions, 2011

The tanker aircraft flies straight and level and extends the hose/drogue, which is allowed to trail out behind and below the tanker under normal aerodynamic forces. The pilot of the receiver aircraft extends the probe (if required) and uses normal flight controls to "fly" the refueling probe directly into the basket. This requires a closure rate of about two knots (walking speed) to push the hose several feet into the HDU and solidly couple the probe and drogue. Too little closure will cause an incomplete connection and no fuel flow (or occasionally leaking fuel). Too much closure is dangerous because it can trigger a strong transverse oscillation in the hose, severing the probe tip.

The optimal approach is from behind and below (not level with) the drogue. Because the drogue is relatively light (typically soft canvas webbing) and subject to aerodynamic forces, it can be pushed around by the bow wave of approaching aircraft, exacerbating engagement even in smooth air. After initial contact, the hose and drogue is pushed forward by the receiver a certain distance (typically, a few feet), and the hose is reeled slowly back onto its drum in the HDU. This opens the tanker's main refueling valve allowing fuel to flow to the drogue under the appropriate pressure (assuming the tanker crew has energized the pump). Tension on the hose is aerodynamically 'balanced' by a motor in the HDU so that as the receiver aircraft moves fore and aft, the hose retracts and extends, thus preventing bends in the hose that would cause undue side loads on the probe. Fuel flow is typically indicated by illumination of a green light near the HDU. If the hose is pushed in too far or not far enough, a cutoff switch will inhibit fuel flow, which is typically accompanied by an amber light. Disengagement is commanded by the tanker pilot with a red light.

The US Navy, Marine Corps, and some US Army aircraft refuel using the "hose-and-drogue" system, as do most aircraft flown by western European militaries. The Soviet Union also used a hose-and-drogue system, dubbed UPAZ, and thus later Russian aircraft may be equipped with probe and drogue. The Chinese PLAF has a fleet of Xian H-6 bombers modified for aerial refueling, and plans to add Russian Ilyushin Il-78 aerial refueling tankers. Tankers can be equipped with multipoint hose-and-drogue systems, allowing them to refuel two (or more) aircraft simultaneously, reducing time spent refueling by as much as 75% for a four-aircraft strike package.

=== Boom drogue adapter units ===
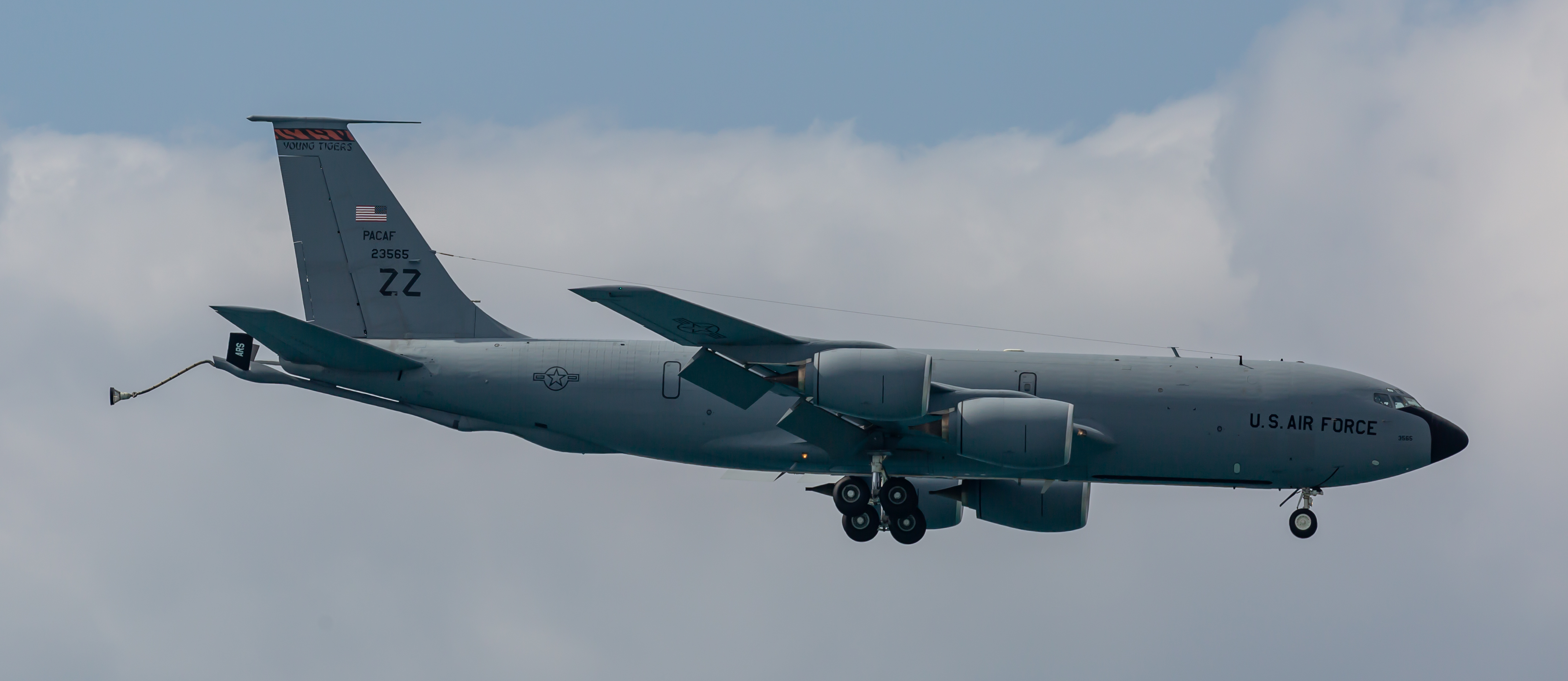
A US Air Force KC-135 with a drogue adapter attached to its boom

USAF KC-135 and French Air Force KC-135FR refueling-boom equipped tankers can be field-converted to a probe-and-drogue system using a special adapter unit. In this configuration, the tanker retains its articulated boom, but has a hose/drogue at the end of it instead of the usual nozzle. The tanker boom operator holds the boom still while the receiver aircraft flies the probe into the basket. Unlike the soft canvas basket used in most drogue systems, the adapter units use a steel basket, grimly known as the "iron maiden" by naval aviators because of its unforgiving nature. Soft drogues can be contacted slightly off center, wherein the probe is guided into the hose receptacle by the canvas drogue. The metal drogue, when contacted even slightly off center, will pivot out of place, potentially "slapping" the aircraft's fuselage and causing damage.

The other major difference with this system is that when contacted, the hose does not "retract" into an HDU. Instead, the hose bends depending on how far it is pushed toward the boom. If it is pushed too far, it can loop around the probe or nose of the aircraft, damage the windscreen, or cause contact with the rigid boom. If not pushed far enough, the probe will disengage, halting fueling. Because of a much smaller position-keeping tolerance, staying properly connected to a KC-135 adapter unit is considerably more difficult than staying in a traditional hose/drogue configuration. When fueling is complete, the receiver carefully backs off until the probe refueling valve disconnects from the valve in the basket. Off center disengagements, like engagements, can cause the drogue to "prang" the probe and/or strike the aircraft's fuselage.

=== Multiple systems ===
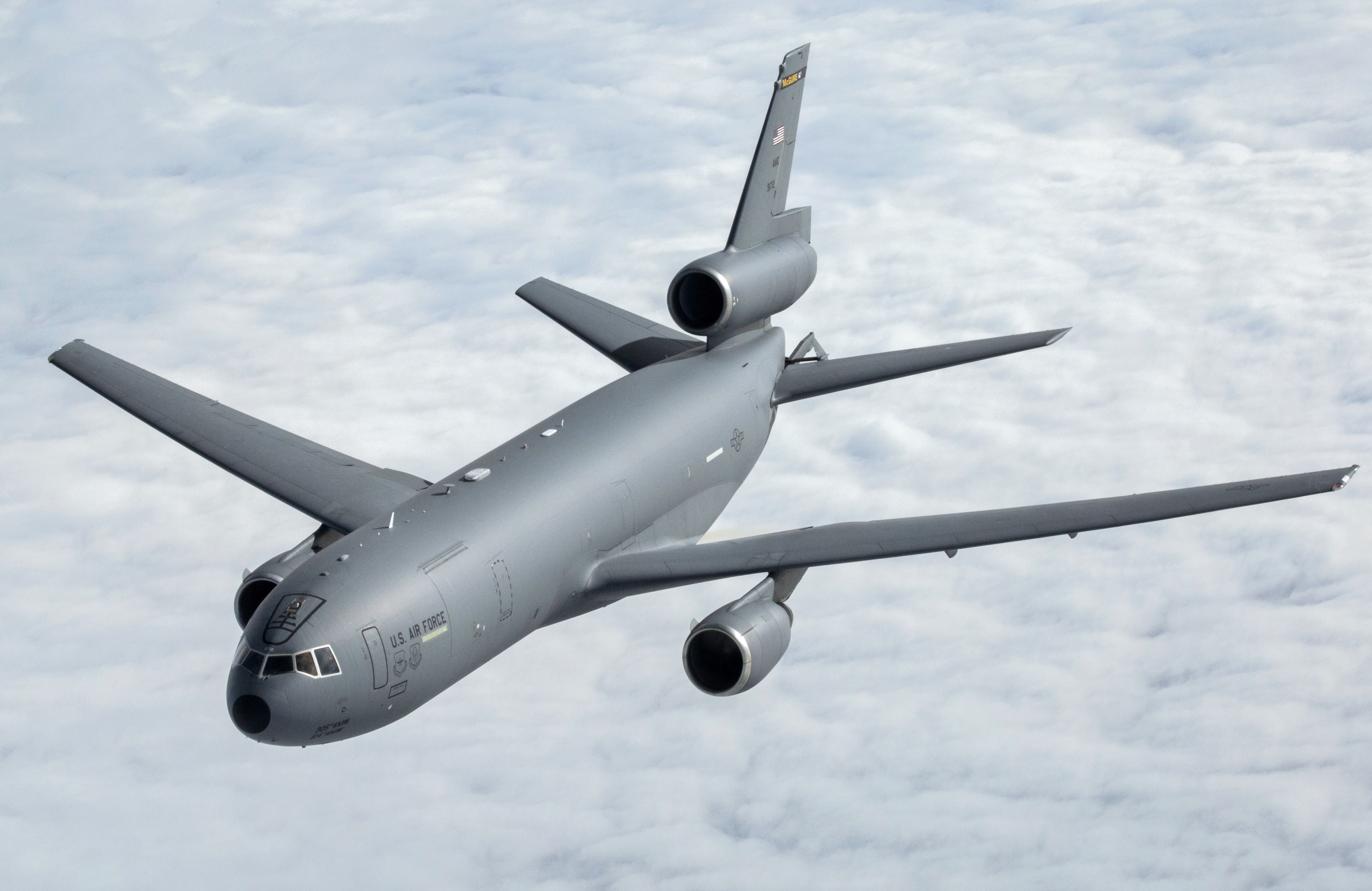
A KC-10 Extender

Some tankers have both a boom and one or more complete hose-and-drogue systems. The USAF KC-10 has both a flying boom and a separate hose-and-drogue system manufactured by Cobham. Both are on the aircraft centerline at the tail of the aircraft, so only one can be used at once. However, such a system allows all types of probe- and receptacle-equipped aircraft to be refueled in a single mission, without landing to install an adapter. Other tankers are equipped with hose-and-drogue attachments that do not interfere with the operation of the centerline boom: many KC-135s are equipped with dual under-wing attachments known as Multi-point Refueling System (MPRSs), while some KC-10s and A330 MRTTs have similar under-wing refueling pods (referred to as Wing Air Refueling Pods or WARPs on the KC-10).

=== Wing-to-wing ===
A small number of Soviet Tu-4s and Tu-16s (the tanker variant was Tu-16Z), used a wing-to-wing method. Similar to the probe-and-drogue method but more complicated, the tanker aircraft released a flexible hose from its wingtip. An aircraft flying alongside had to catch the hose with a special lock under its wingtip. After the hose was locked and the connection was established, the fuel was pumped.

=== Simple grappling ===
Some historic systems used for pioneering aerial refueling used the grappling method, where the tanker aircraft unreeled the fuel hose and the receiver aircraft would grapple the hose midair, reel it in and connect it so that fuel can be transferred either with the assistance of pumps or simply by gravity feed. This was the method used on the Question Mark endurance flight in 1929.

== Compatibility issues ==
The probe-and-drogue system is not compatible with flying boom equipment, creating a problem for military planners where mixed forces are involved. Incompatibility can also complicate the procurement of new systems. The Royal Canadian Air Force currently wish to purchase the F-35A, which can only refuel via the flying boom, but only possess probe-and-drogue refuelers. The potential cost of converting F-35As to probe-and-drogue refueling (as is used on US Navy & Marine Corps F-35Bs and F-35Cs) added to the early-2010s political controversy which surrounded F-35 procurement within the RCAF.

These concerns can be addressed by drogue adapters (see section "Boom drogue adapter units" above) that allow drogue aircraft to refuel from boom-equipped aircraft, and by refuelers that are equipped with both drogue and boom units and can thus refuel both types in the same flight, such as the Boeing MPRS KC-135, KC-10, KC-46, and Airbus A330 MRTT.

=== Strategic ===
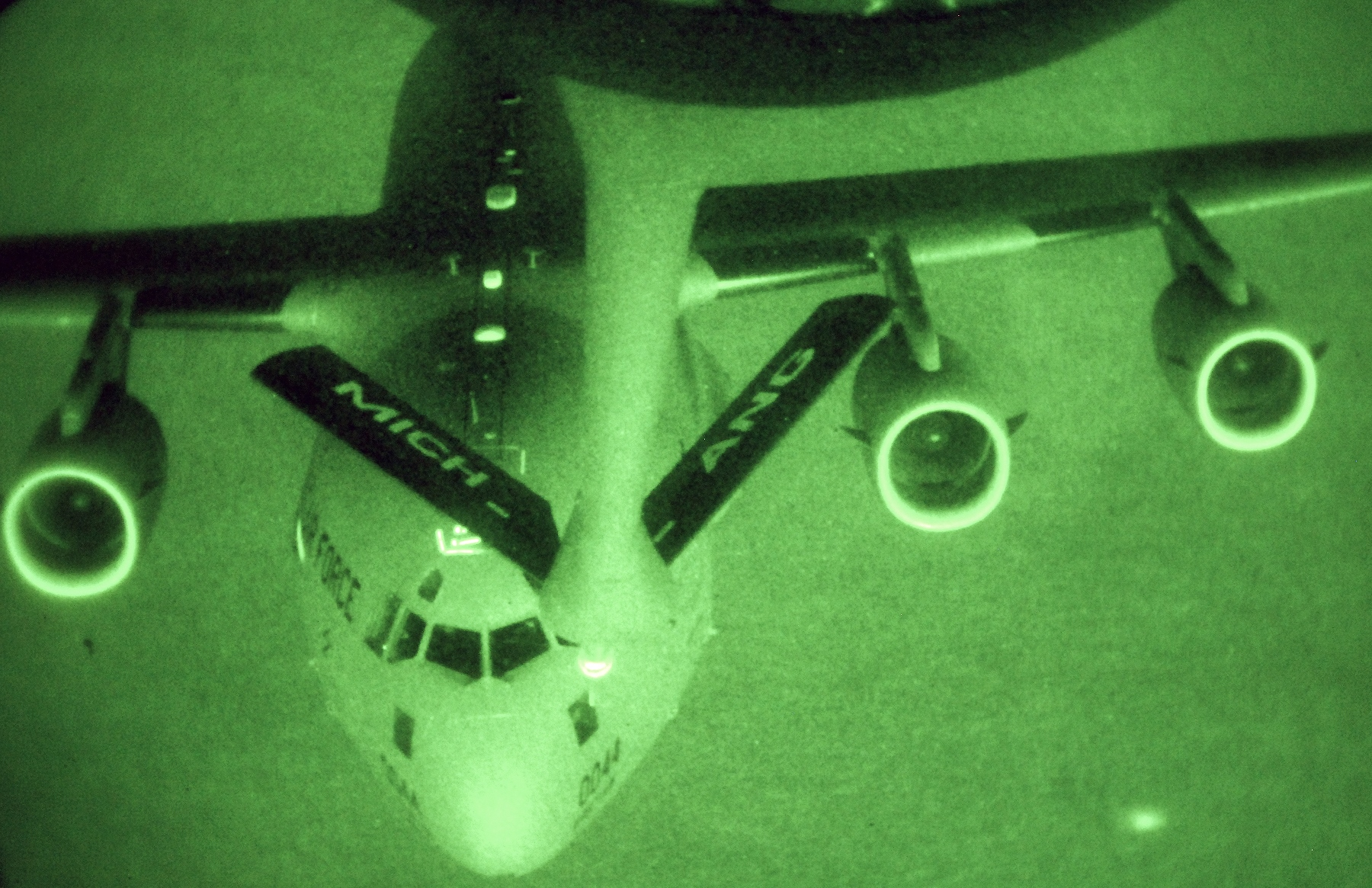
A C-17 Globemaster III receives fuel from a KC-135 during night operations.

The development of the KC-97 and Boeing KC-135 Stratotankers was pushed by the Cold War requirement of the United States to be able to keep fleets of nuclear-armed B-47 Stratojet and B-52 Stratofortress strategic bombers airborne around-the-clock either to threaten retaliation against a Soviet strike for mutual assured destruction, or to bomb the USSR first had it been ordered to do so. The bombers would fly orbits around their assigned positions from which they were to enter Soviet airspace if they received the order, and the tankers would refill the bombers' fuel tanks so that they could keep a force in the air 24 hours a day, and still have enough fuel to reach their targets in the Soviet Union. This also ensured that a first strike against the bombers' airfields could not obliterate the US's ability to retaliate by bomber.

In 1958, Valiant tankers in the UK were developed with one HDU mounted in the bomb-bay. Valiant tankers of 214 Squadron were used to demonstrate radius of action by refueling a Valiant bomber non-stop from UK to Singapore in 1960 and a Vulcan bomber to Australia in 1961. Other UK exercises involving refueling aircraft from Valiant tankers included Javelin and Lightning fighters, also Vulcan and Victor bombers. For instance, in 1962 a squadron of Javelin air defense aircraft was refueled in stages from the UK to India and back (exercise "Shiksha"). After the retirement of the Valiant in 1965, the Handley Page Victor took over the UK refueling role and had three hoses (HDUs). These were a fuselage-mounted HDU and a refueling pod on each wing. The center hose could refuel any probe-equipped aircraft, the wing pods could refuel the more maneuverable fighter/ground attack types.

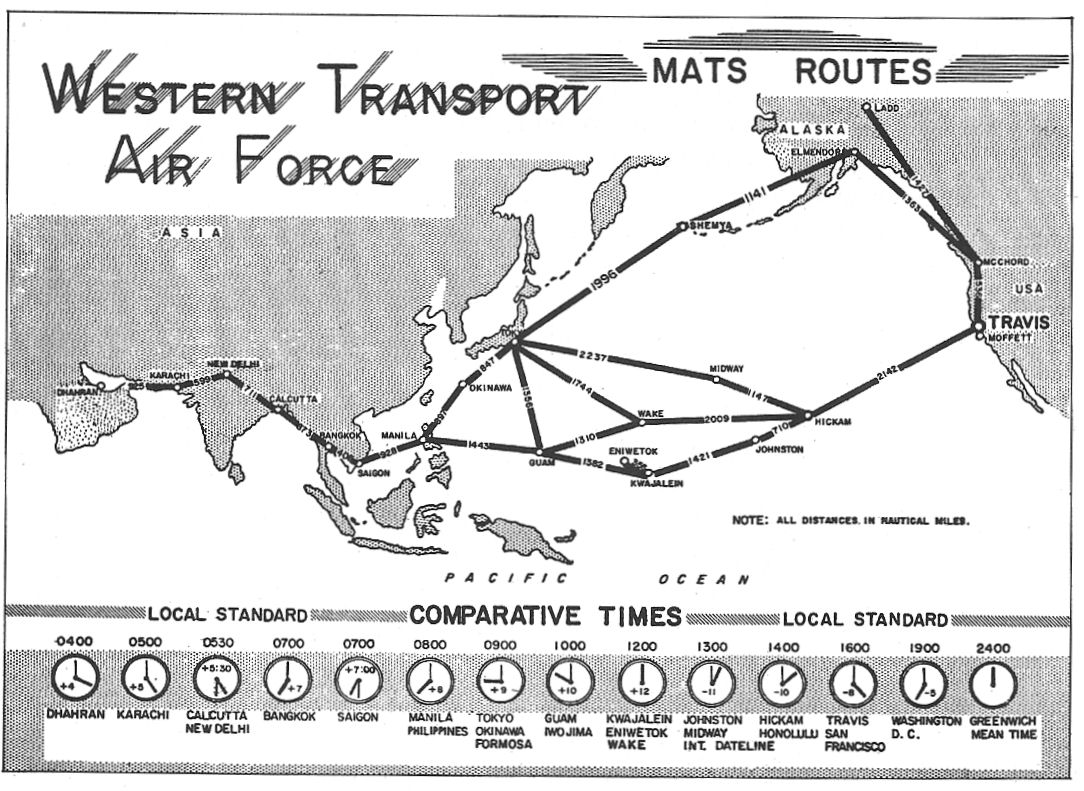
Route map for MATS (West) 1964

A byproduct of this development effort and the building of large numbers of tankers was that these tankers were also available to refuel cargo aircraft, fighter aircraft, and ground attack aircraft, in addition to bombers, for ferrying to distant theaters of operations. This was much used during the Vietnam War, when many aircraft could not have covered the transoceanic distances without aerial refueling, even with intermediate bases such as Hickam Air Force Base, Hawaii and Kadena Air Base, Okinawa. In addition to allowing the transport of the aircraft themselves, the cargo aircraft could also carry matériel, supplies, and personnel to Vietnam without landing to refuel. KC-135s were also frequently used for refueling of air combat missions from air bases in Thailand.

The USAF SR-71 Blackbird strategic reconnaissance aircraft made frequent use of air-to-air refueling. Indeed, design considerations of the aircraft made its mission impossible without aerial refueling. Based at Beale AFB in central California, SR-71s had to be forward-deployed to Europe and Japan prior to flying actual reconnaissance missions. These trans-Pacific and trans-Atlantic flights during deployment were impossible without aerial refueling. The SR-71's designers traded takeoff performance for better high-speed, high-altitude performance, necessitating takeoff with less-than-full fuel tanks from even the longest runways. Once airborne, the Blackbird would accelerate to supersonic speed using afterburners to facilitate structural heating and expansion. The magnitude of temperature changes experienced by the SR-71, from parked to its maximum speed, resulted in significant expansion of its structural parts in cruise flight. To allow for the expansion, the Blackbird's parts had to fit loosely when cold, so loosely, in fact, that the Blackbird constantly leaked fuel before heating expanded the airframe enough to seal its fuel tanks. Following the supersonic dash the SR-71 would then rendezvous with a tanker to fill its now nearly empty tanks before proceeding on its mission. This was referred to as the LTTR (for "Launch To Tanker Rendezvous") profile. LTTR had the added advantage of providing an operational test of the Blackbird's refueling capability within minutes after takeoff, enabling a Return-To-Launch-Site abort capability if necessary. At its most efficient altitude and speed, the Blackbird was capable of flying for many hours without refueling. The SR-71 used a special fuel, JP-7, with a very high flash point to withstand the extreme skin temperatures generated during Mach 3+ cruise flight. While JP-7 could be used by other aircraft, its burn characteristics posed problems in certain situations (such as high-altitude, emergency engine starts) that made it less than optimal for aircraft other than the SR-71.

Normally, all the fuel aboard a tanker aircraft may be either offloaded, or burned by the tanker as necessary. To make this possible, the KC-135 fuel system incorporated gravity draining and pumps to allow moving fuel from tank to tank depending on mission needs. Mixing JP-7 with JP-4 or Jet A, however, rendered it unsuitable for use by the SR-71, so the Air Force commissioned a specially modified KC-135 variant, the KC-135Q, which included changes to the fuel system and operating procedures preventing inadvertent inflight mixing of fuel intended for offload with fuel intended for use by the tanker. SR-71 aircraft were refueled exclusively by KC-135Q tankers.

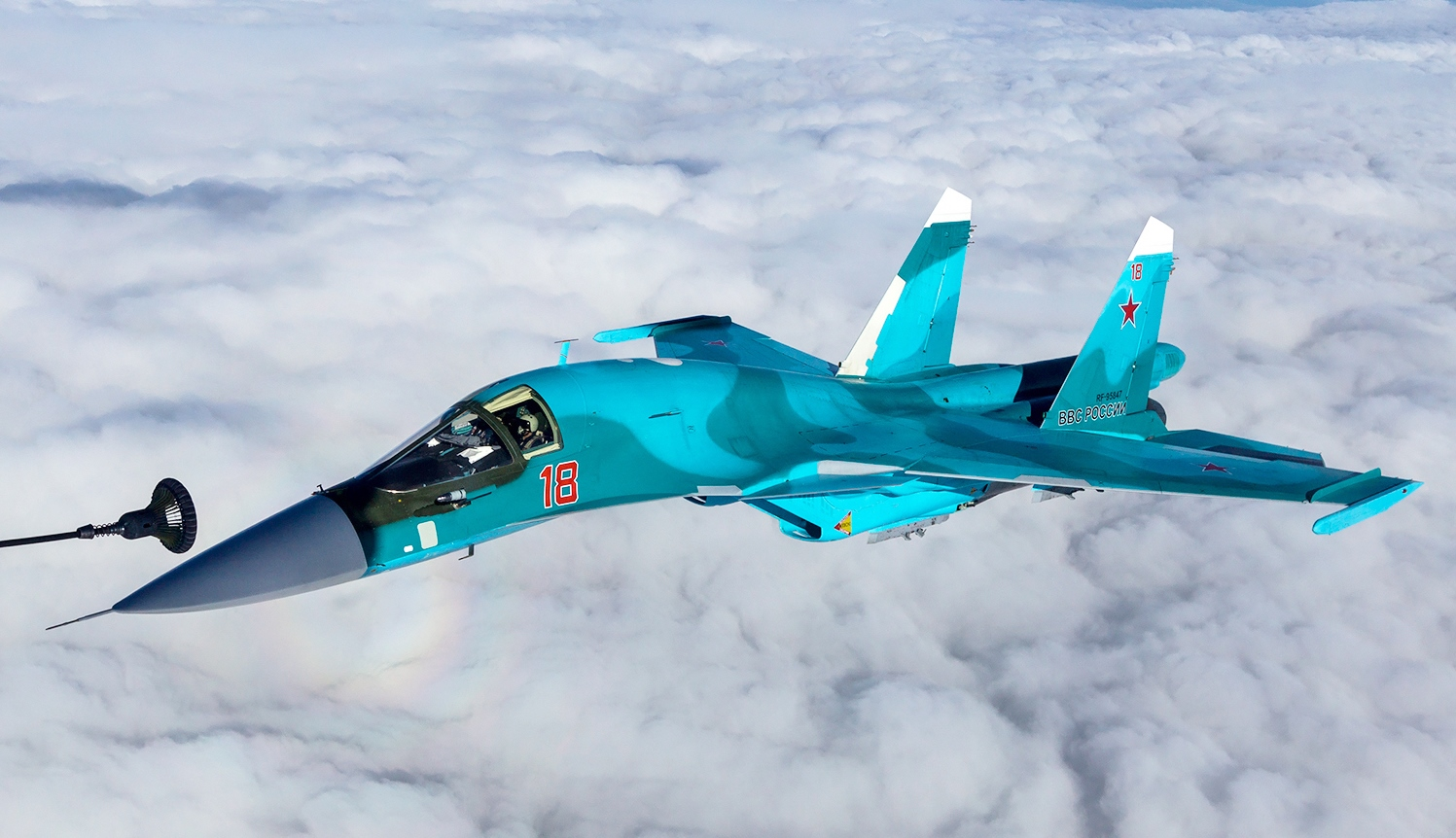
A Russian Air Force Sukhoi Su-34 takes on fuel through a Probe-and-drogue system

=== Tactical ===
Tankers are considered "force multipliers", because they convey considerable tactical advantages. Primarily, aerial refueling adds to the combat radius of attack, fighter and bombers aircraft, and allows patrol aircraft to remain airborne longer, thereby reducing the number of aircraft necessary to accomplish a given mission. Aerial refueling can also mitigate basing issues that might otherwise place limitations on combat payload. Combat aircraft operating from airfields with shorter runways must limit their takeoff weight, which could mean a choice between range (fuel) and combat payload (munitions). Aerial refueling, however, eliminates many of these basing difficulties because a combat aircraft can take off with a full combat payload and refuel immediately.

== Operational history ==
=== Cold War ===
Even as the first practical methods for aerial refueling were being developed, military planners had already envisioned what missions could be greatly enhanced by using such techniques. In the emerging Cold War climate of the late 1940s, the ability for bombers to perform increasingly long distance missions would enable targets to be struck even from air bases on a different continent. Thus, it became commonplace for nuclear-armed strategic bombers to be equipped with aerial refueling apparatus and for it to be used to facilitate long distance patrols.

During the late 1950s, aerial refueling had become so prevalent amongst the bombers operated by the US Air Force's Strategic Air Command that many, such as the Convair B-58 Hustler, would operate largely or entirely out of bases in the continental United States while maintaining strategic reach. This practice was promoted to address security concerns as well as diplomatic objections from some overseas states that did not want nuclear weapons kept on their soil. In one early demonstration of the Boeing B-52 Stratofortress's global reach, performed between 16 and 18 January 1957, three B-52Bs made a non-stop flight around the world during Operation Power Flite, during which 24,325 miles (21,145 nmi, 39,165 km) was covered in 45 hours 19 minutes (536.8 smph) with multiple in-flight refuelings being performed from KC-97s.

While development of the Avro Vulcan strategic bomber was underway, British officials recognised that its operational flexibility could be improved by the provision of in-flight refueling equipment. Accordingly, from the 16th aircraft to be completed onwards, the Vulcan was furnished with in-flight refueling receiving equipment. While continuous airborne patrols were flown by the RAF for a time, these were deemed to be untenable, and the refueling mechanisms across the Vulcan fleet largely fell into disuse during the 1960s. When the RAF chose to optimise its bomber fleet away from high-altitude flight and towards low-level penetration missions, bombers such as the Handley Page Victor were fitted with aerial refueling probes and additional fuel tanks to counter the decreased range from the shift in flight profile.

During the mid-1950s, to deliver France's independent nuclear deterrent, work commenced on what would become the Dassault Mirage IV supersonic bomber. The dimensions of this bomber was greatly determined by the viability of aerial refueling, with work on an enlarged variant of the Mirage IV ultimately being aborted in favour of a greater reliance upon aerial tanker aircraft instead. In order to refuel the Mirage IVA fleet, France purchased 14 (12 plus 2 spares) US Boeing C-135F tankers. Mirage IVAs also often operated in pairs, with one aircraft carrying a weapon and the other carrying fuel tanks and a buddy refueling pack, allowing it to refuel its partner en route to the target. While able to strike at numerous targets inside of the Soviet Union, the inability for the Mirage IV to return from some missions had been a point of controversy during the aircraft's design phase.

=== Korean War ===
On 6 July 1951, the first combat air refueling of fighter-type aircraft took place over Korea. Three RF-80As launched from Taegu with the modified tip-tanks and rendezvoused with a tanker offshore of Wonsan, North Korea. Through in-flight refueling, the RF-80s effectively doubled their range, which enabled them to photograph valuable targets in North Korea.

=== Vietnam War ===
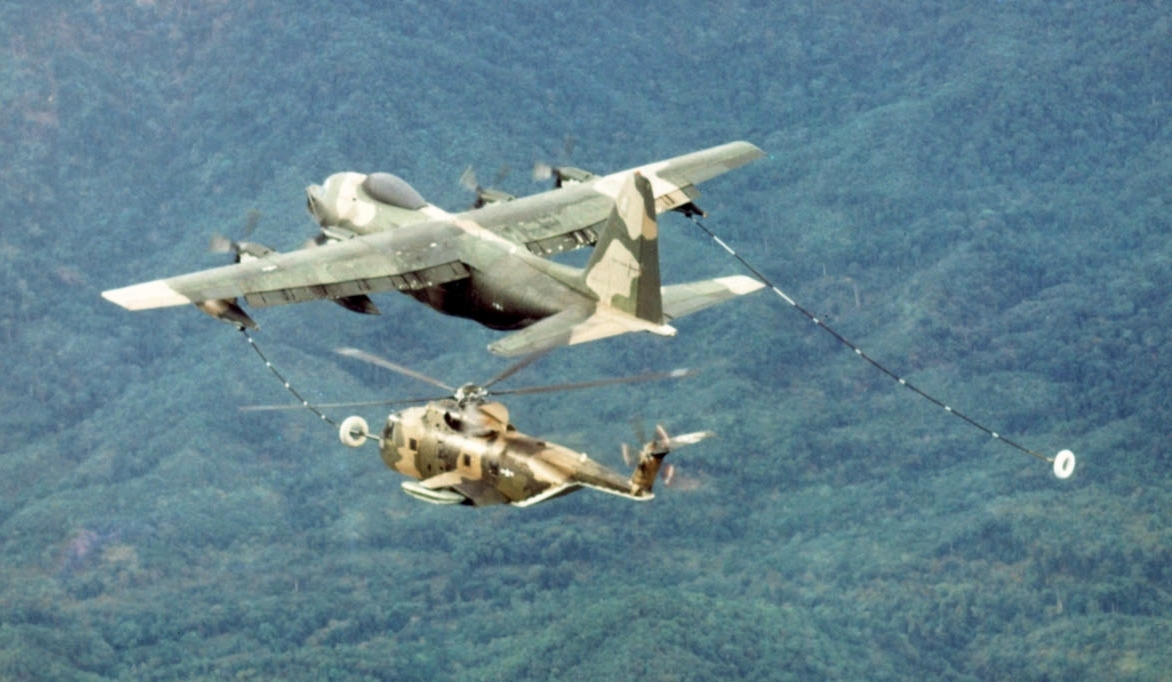
HC-130P refuels HH-3E over Southeast Asia

During the Vietnam War, it was common for USAF fighter-bombers flying from Thailand to North Vietnam to refuel from KC-135s en route to their target. Besides extending their range, this enabled the F-105s and F-4 Phantoms to carry more bombs and rockets. Tankers were also available for refueling on the way back if necessary. In addition to ferrying aircraft across the Pacific Ocean, aerial refueling made it possible for battle-damaged fighters, with heavily leaking fuel tanks, to hook up to the tankers and let the tanker feed its engine(s) until the point where they could glide to the base and land. This saved numerous aircraft.

The US Navy frequently used carrier-based aerial tankers like the KA-3 Skywarrior to refuel Navy and Marine aircraft such as the F-4, A-4 Skyhawk, A-6 Intruder, and A-7 Corsair II. This was particularly useful when a pilot returning from an airstrike was having difficulty landing and was running low on jet fuel. This gave them fuel for more attempts at landing for a successful "trap" on an aircraft carrier. The KA-3 could also refuel fighters on extended Combat Air Patrol. USMC jets based in South Vietnam and Thailand also used USMC KC-130 Hercules transports for air-to-air refueling on missions.

During late August 1970, a pair of HH-53C helicopters performed the first Trans-Pacific flight by a helicopter, flying from Eglin AFB in Florida to Danang in South Vietnam. In addition to making multiple en route stops to refuel on the ground, aerial refueling was also used in this display of the type's long-range capabilities. The flight proved to be roughly four times faster than the traditional dispatching of rotorcraft to the theatre by ship.

=== Middle East ===
During the 1980s Iran–Iraq War, the Iranian Air Force maintained at least one KC 707-3J9C aerial tanker, which the Islamic Republic had inherited from the Shah's government. This was used most effectively on 4 April 1981, refueling eight IRIAF F-4 Phantoms on long-range sorties into Iraq to bomb the H-3 Al Walid airfield near the Jordanian border, destroying 27–50 Iraqi fighter jets and bombers. However, the Iranian Air Force was forced to cancel its 180-day air offensive and attempts to control Iranian airspace due to unsustainable rates of attrition.

The Israeli Air Force has a fleet of Boeing 707s equipped with a boom refueling system similar to the KC-135; this system has the Israeli name Ram, used to refuel and extend the range of fighter bombers such as the F-15I and F-16I for deterrent and strike missions. They are nearing 60 years old and Israel does not disclose the number of tankers in their fleet. In 1985, Israeli F-15s used heavily modified 707 aircraft to provide aerial refueling over the Mediterranean Sea in order to extend their range for Operation Wooden Leg, an air raid on the headquarters of the Palestine Liberation Organization (PLO) near Tunis, Tunisia, that necessitated a 2,000 km flight. As of 2021 Israel has ordered four of a planned eight Boeing KC-46 Pegasus boom refueling tankers and has requested that the first two aircraft be fast-tracked for delivery in 2022 when they were to be delivered in 2023. The Jerusalem Post reports that Israeli commanders have made this request to enhance the strategic deterrence against Iran; the same article reports that the US, whose air force is also taking its first deliveries of the aircraft type, had refused to move forward the deliveries while supporting Israel's deterrence. The JPost editor wrote "The US State Department approved the possible sale of up to eight KC-46 tanker aircraft and related equipment to Israel for an estimated cost of $2.4 billion last March (i.e. 5/2020), marking the first time that Washington has allowed Jerusalem to buy new tankers."

=== Falklands War ===
During the Falklands War, aerial refueling played a vital role in all of the successful Argentine attacks against the Royal Navy. The Argentine Air Force had only two KC-130H Hercules available and they were used to refuel both Air Force and Navy A-4 Skyhawks and Navy Super Etendards in their Exocet strikes. The Hercules on several occasions approached the islands (where the Sea Harriers were in patrol) to search and guide the A-4s in their returning flights. On one of those flights (callsign Jaguar) one of the KC-130s went to rescue a damaged A-4 and delivered 39,000 lb (18,000 kg) of fuel while carrying it to its airfield at San Julian. However, the Mirage IIIs and Daggers lack of air refueling capability prevented them from achieving better results. The Mirages were unable to reach the islands with a strike payload, and the Daggers could do so only for a five-minute strike flight.

On the British side, air refueling was carried out by the Handley Page Victor K.2 and, after the Argentine surrender, by modified C-130 Hercules tankers. These aircraft aided deployments from the UK to the Ascension Island staging post in the Atlantic and further deployments south of bomber, transport and maritime patrol aircraft. The most famous refueling missions were the 8,000 nmi (15,000 km) "Operation Black Buck" sorties which used 14 Victor tankers to allow an Avro Vulcan bomber (with a flying reserve bomber) to attack the Argentine-captured airfield at Port Stanley on the Falkland Islands. With all the aircraft flying from Ascension, the tankers themselves needed refueling. The raids were the longest-range bombing raids in history until surpassed by the Boeing B-52s flying from the continental USA to bomb Iraq in the 1991 Gulf War and later B-2 flights.

=== Gulf War ===
During the time of Operation Desert Shield, the military buildup to the Persian Gulf War, US Air Force Boeing KC-135s & McDonnell Douglas KC-10As, and USMC KC-130 Hercules aircraft were deployed to forward air bases in England, Diego Garcia, and Saudi Arabia. Aircraft stationed in Saudi Arabia normally maintained an orbit in the Saudi–Iraqi neutral zone, informally known as "Frisbee", and refueled coalition aircraft whenever necessary. Two side by side tracks over central Saudi Arabia called "Prune" and "Raisin" featured 2–4 basket equipped KC-135 tankers each and were used by Navy aircraft from the Red Sea Battle Force. Large Navy strike groups from the Red Sea would send A-6 tankers to the Prune and Raisin tracks ahead of the strike aircraft arriving to top off and take up station to the right of the Air Force tankers thereby providing an additional tanking point. RAF Handley Page Victor and Vickers VC10 tankers were also used to refuel British and coalition aircraft and were popular with the US Navy for their docile basket behavior and having three point refueling stations. An additional track was maintained close to the northwest border for the E-3 AWACS aircraft and any Navy aircraft needing emergency fuel. These 24-hour air-refueling zones enabled the intense air campaign during Desert Storm. An additional 24/7 tanker presence was maintained over the Red Sea itself to refuel Navy F-14 Tomcats maintaining Combat Air Patrol tracks. During the conflict's final week, KC-10s moved inside Iraq to support barrier CAP missions set up to block Iraqi fighters from escaping to Iran.

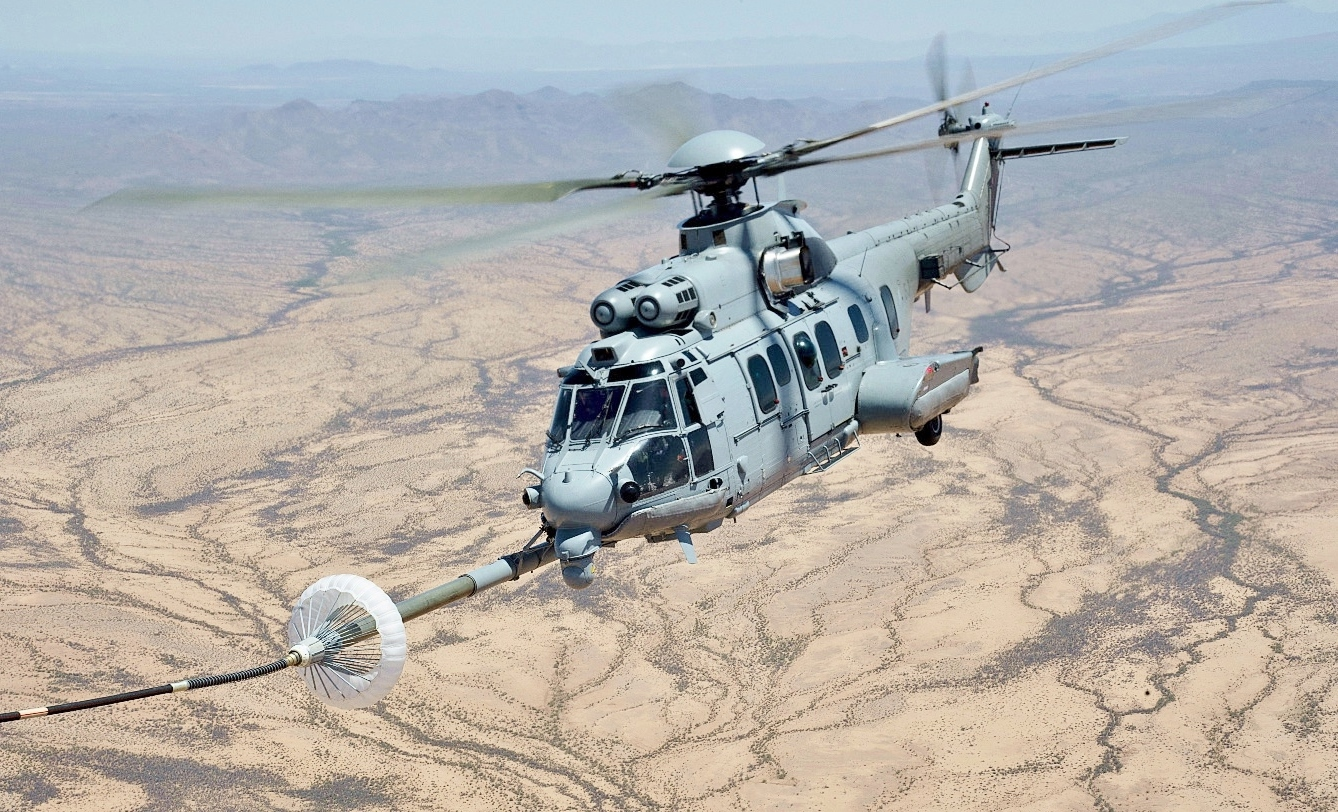
A French Air Force EC725 is refueled by a Lockheed HC-130 during Exercise Angel Thunder

On 16–17 January 1991, the first combat sortie of Operation Desert Storm, and the longest combat sortie in history at that time, was launched from Barksdale AFB, Louisiana. Seven B-52Gs flew a thirty-five-hour mission to the region and back to launch 35 Boeing Air Launched Cruise Missiles (ALCMs) with the surprise use of conventional warheads. This attack, which successfully destroyed 85–95 percent of intended targets, would have been impossible without the support of refueling tankers.

An extremely useful tanker in Desert Storm was the USAF's KC-10A Extender. Besides being larger than the other tankers deployed, the KC-10A is equipped with the USAF "boom" refueling and also the "hose-and-drogue" system, enabling it to refuel not only USAF aircraft, and also USMC and US Navy jets that use the "probe-and-drogue" system, and also allied aircraft, such as those from the UK and Saudi Arabia (though KC-135s may also be equipped with a drogue depending on the mission profile). With a full jet fuel load, the KC-10A is capable of flying from a base on the American East Coast, flying nonstop to Europe, transferring a considerable amount of fuel to other aircraft, and returning to its home base without landing anywhere else.

On 24 January 1991, the Iraqi Air Force launched the Attack on Ras Tanura, an attempt to bomb the Ras Tanura oil facility in Saudi Arabia. On their way to the target, the Iraqi attack aircraft were refueled by tanker at an altitude of 100 meters. The attack ultimately failed, with two aircraft turning back and the remaining two shot down.

=== Operation Bandar ===
The Ilyushin Il-78 MKI aircraft of the Indian Air Force was deployed during the 2019 Balakot airstrike. The Il-78MKIs supported the Dassault Mirage 2000 and their Sukhoi Su-30MKI which acted as escort fighters.

=== Centennial Contact ===
On 27 June 2023 the United States Air Force, including the Air National Guard, commemorated the 100-year anniversary of the first aerial refueling by holding "Operation Centennial Contact." Aircraft from various bases conducted aerial refueling exercises across the United States, as well as conducting flyovers in 50 states. 152 aircraft were slated to participate in the operation, with 82 tanker aircraft providing refueling support to 70 other participating aircraft.

The aircraft participating included 49 Boeing KC-135 Stratotanker; 29 Boeing KC-46 Pegasus; four McDonnell Douglas KC-10 Extenders, and aircraft receiving fuel included 21 Lockheed C-130 Hercules; 13 Boeing C-17 Globemaster III; ten McDonnell Douglas F-15 Eagle; eight Lockheed Martin F-22 Raptor; six Fairchild Republic A-10 Thunderbolt II; five General Dynamics F-16 Fighting Falcons; four Lockheed Martin F-35 Lightning II; two Boeing B-52 Stratofortresses; and one Lockheed C-5 Galaxy.

== Helicopters ==
Helicopter in-flight refueling (HIFR) is a variation of aerial refueling when a naval helicopter approaches a warship (not necessarily suited for landing operations) and receives fuel through the cabin while hovering. Alternatively, some helicopters like the HH-60 Pave Hawk and Sikorsky CH-53K King Stallion are equipped with a probe extending out the front can be refueled from a drogue-equipped tanker aircraft in a similar manner to fixed-wing aircraft by matching a high forward speed for a helicopter to a slow speed for the fixed-wing tanker.

== Longest crewed flight record ==
A mission modified Cessna 172 Skyhawk with a crew of two set the world record for the longest continuous crewed flight without landing of 64 days, 22 hours, 19 minutes, and five seconds in 1958. A Ford truck was outfitted with a fuel pump, tank, and other paraphernalia required to support the aircraft in flight. The publicity flight for a Las Vegas area hotel ended when the aircraft's performance had degraded to the point where the Cessna had difficulty climbing away from the refueling vehicle.

== Developments ==
- Commercial tankers are occasionally used by military forces. The Omega Aerial Refueling Services company and Metrea Strategic Mobility are contracted by the US Navy. In June 2023, Metrea completed the first commercial refueling of the US Air Force.
- Autonomous (hands off) refueling using probe/drogue systems was investigated by NASA, potentially for use by unmanned aerial vehicles in the KQ-X program.

== Operators ==
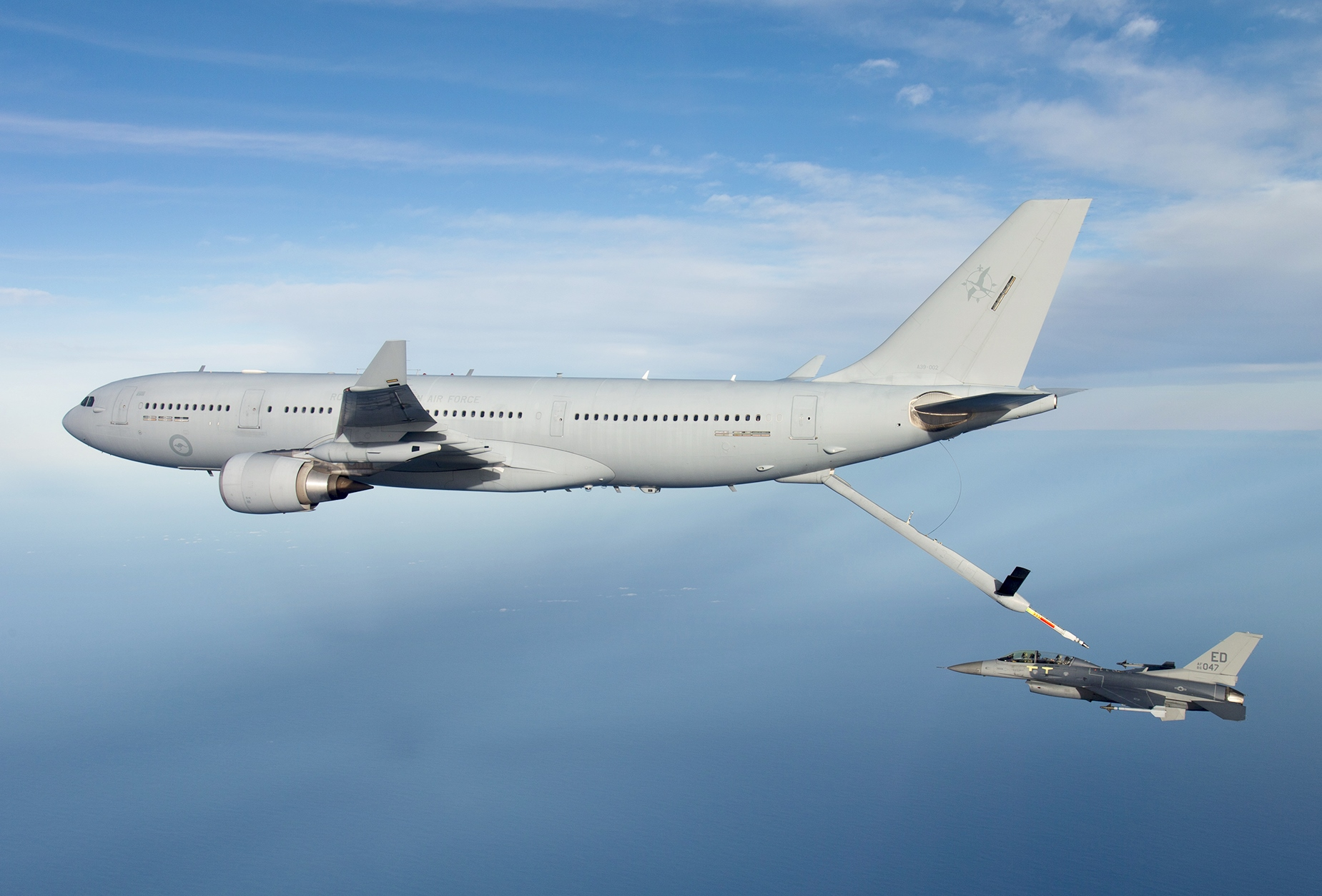
A RAAF KC-30 refuels a USAF F-16

Algeria

- Algerian Air Force

Argentina

- Argentine Air Force

Australia

- Royal Australian Air Force

Brazil

- Brazilian Air Force

Canada

- Royal Canadian Air Force

Chile

- Chilean Air Force

China

- People's Liberation Army Air Force

Colombia

- Colombian Air Force

Egypt

- Egyptian Air Force

France

- French Air Force
- French Navy

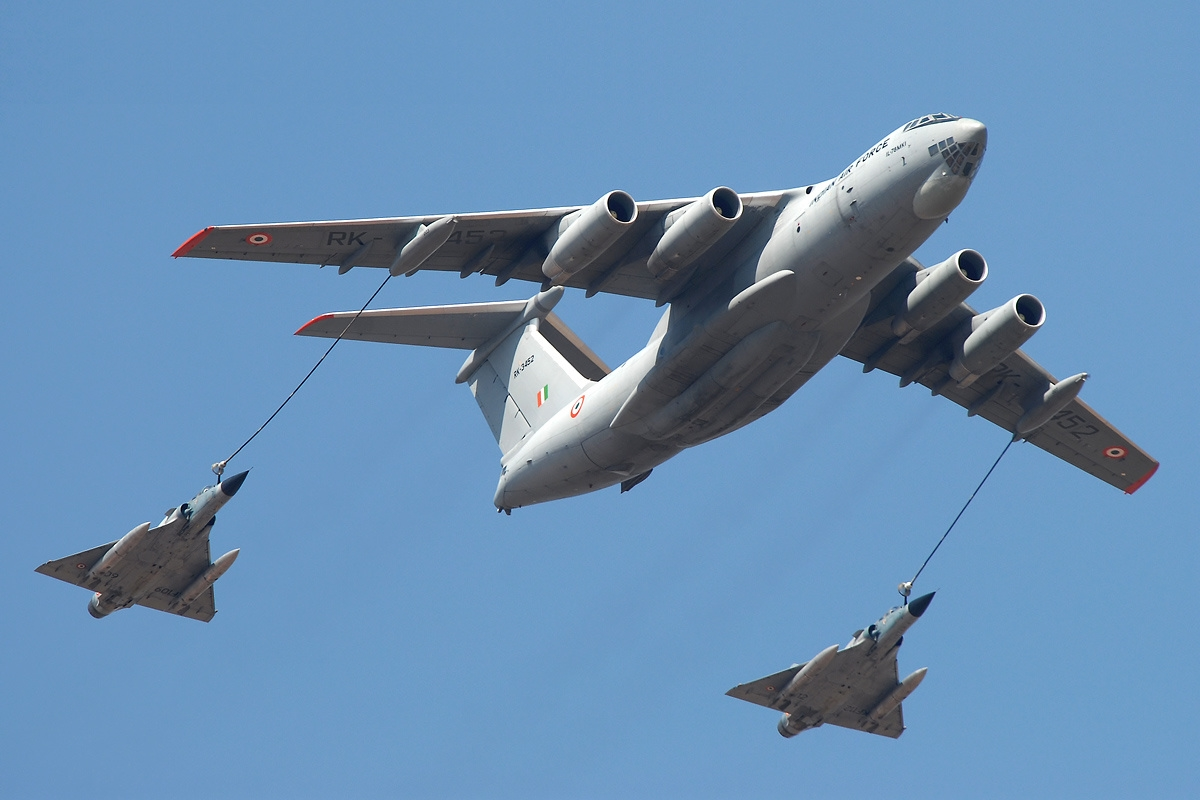
An IAF Ilyushin Il-78MKI provides mid-air refueling to two Mirage 2000

Germany

- German Air Force

India

- Indian Air Force

Indonesia

- Indonesian Air Force

Iran

- Islamic Republic of Iran Air Force

Israel

- Israeli Air Force

Italy

- Italian Air Force

Japan

- Japan Air Self-Defense Force

South Korea

- Republic of Korea Air Force

Kuwait

- Kuwait Air Force

Malaysia

- Royal Malaysian Air Force

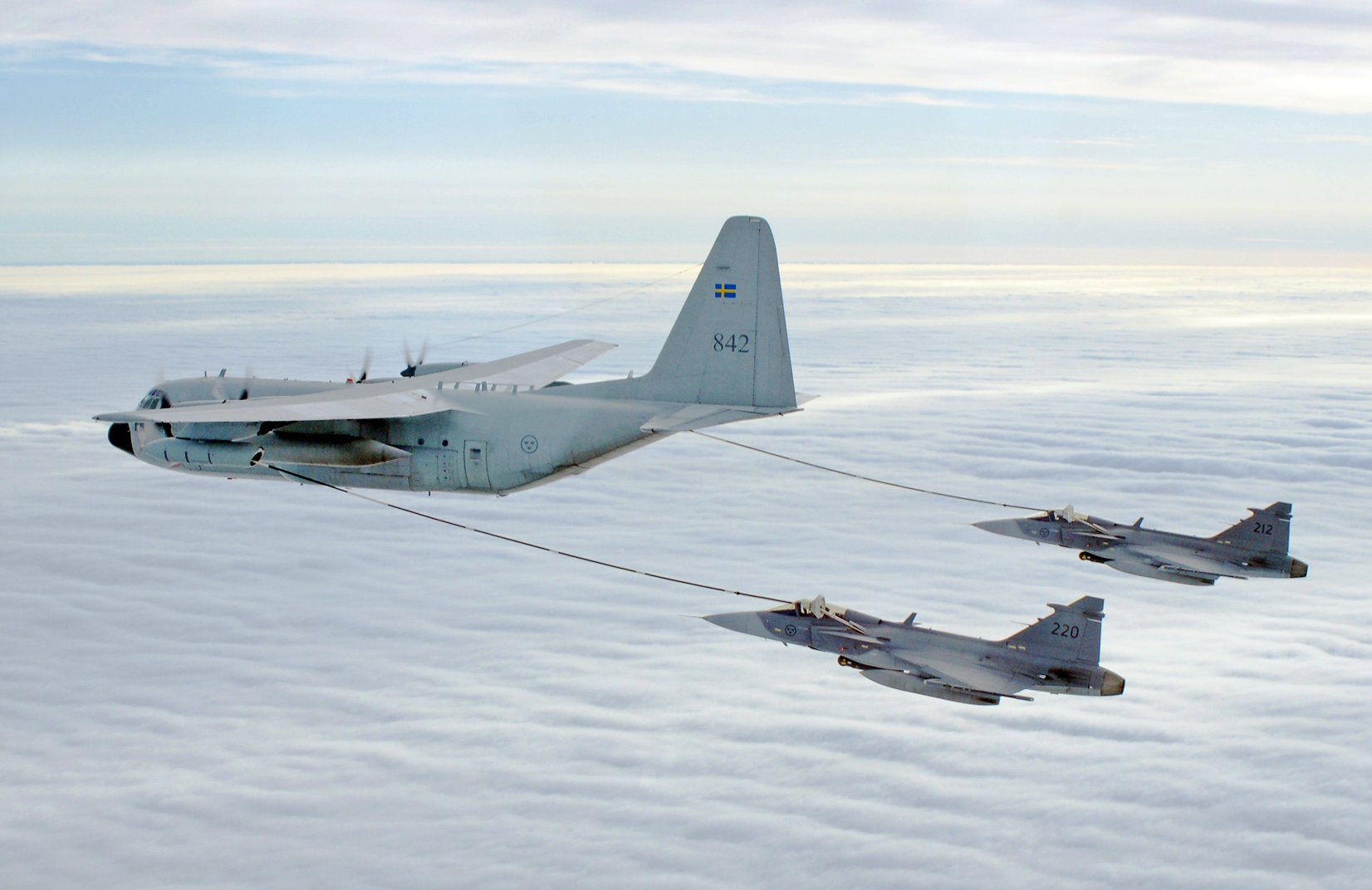
Two Saab JAS-39 Gripen of the Swedish Air Force undergoing inflight refueling.

Morocco

- Royal Moroccan Air Force

Netherlands

- Royal Netherlands Air Force

Pakistan

- Pakistan Air Force

Portugal

- Portuguese Air Force

Russia

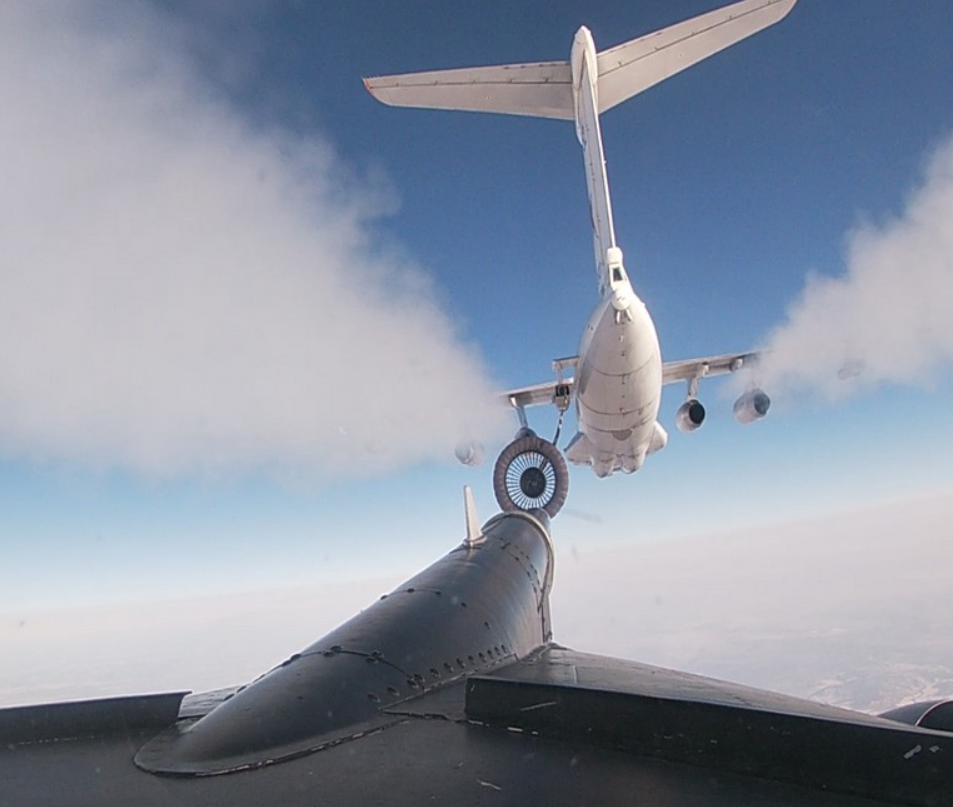
Tu-95М filling rod and filling cone from Il-78M aircraft

- Russian Air Force

Singapore

- Republic of Singapore Air Force

Spain

- Spanish Air and Space Force

Sweden

- Swedish Air Force

Turkey

- Turkish Air Force

United Arab Emirates

- United Arab Emirates Air Force

United Kingdom

- Royal Air Force

Saudi Arabia

- Royal Saudi Air Force

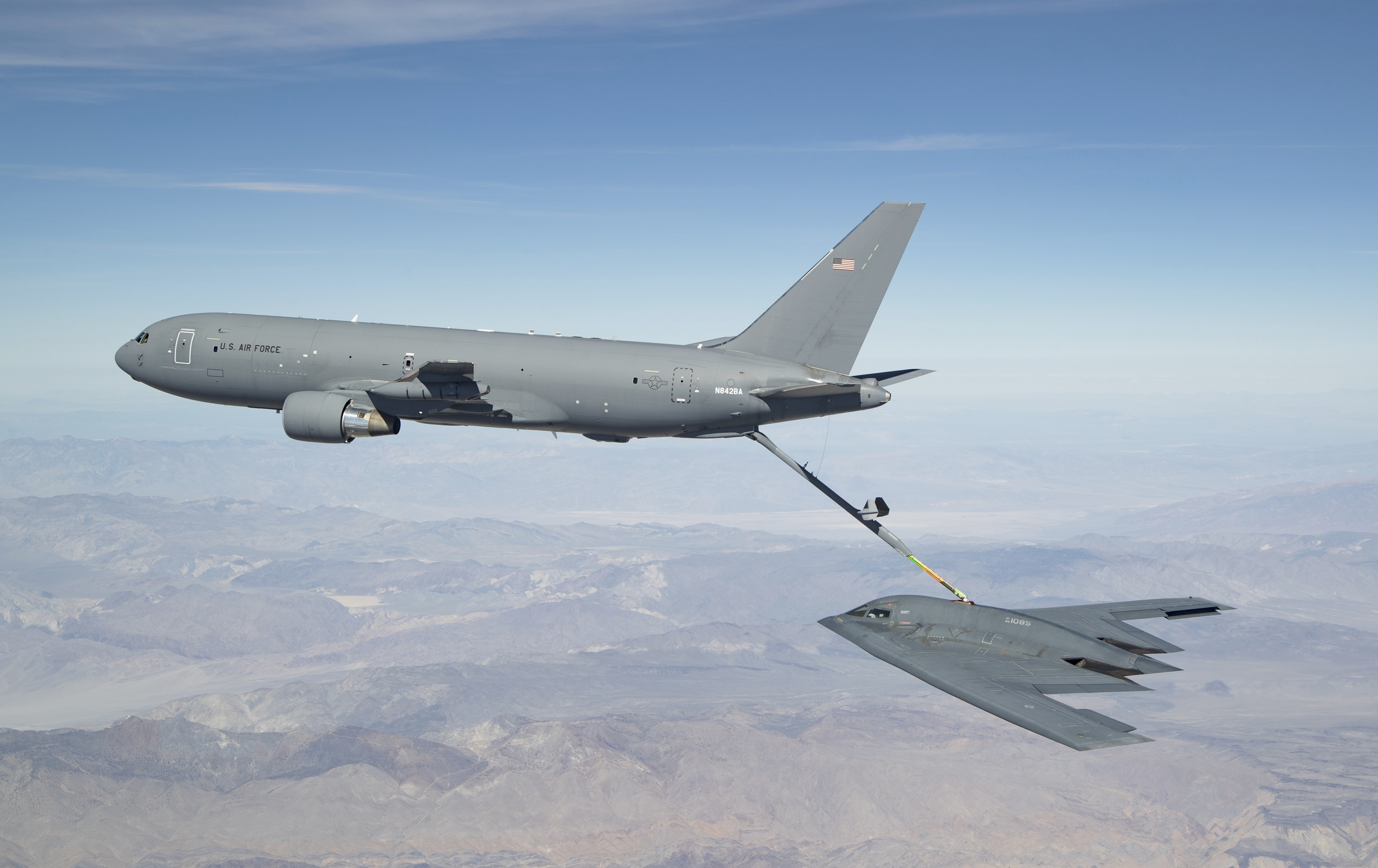
A KC-46 Pegasus refuels a B-2 over Edwards AFB

United States

- United States Air Force
- United States Marine Corps
- United States Navy

Venezuela

- Venezuelan Air Force

== See also ==
- Military logistics
- Propellant depot
- Underway replenishment, the transfer of refuel and stores at sea
- List of tanker aircraft
- List of United States military aerial refueling aircraft
