= H-3 airstrike =

1981 Iranian air raid of the Iran-Iraq War

H-3 airstrike عملیات اچ۳ (Persian)
- Part of Iran–Iraq War
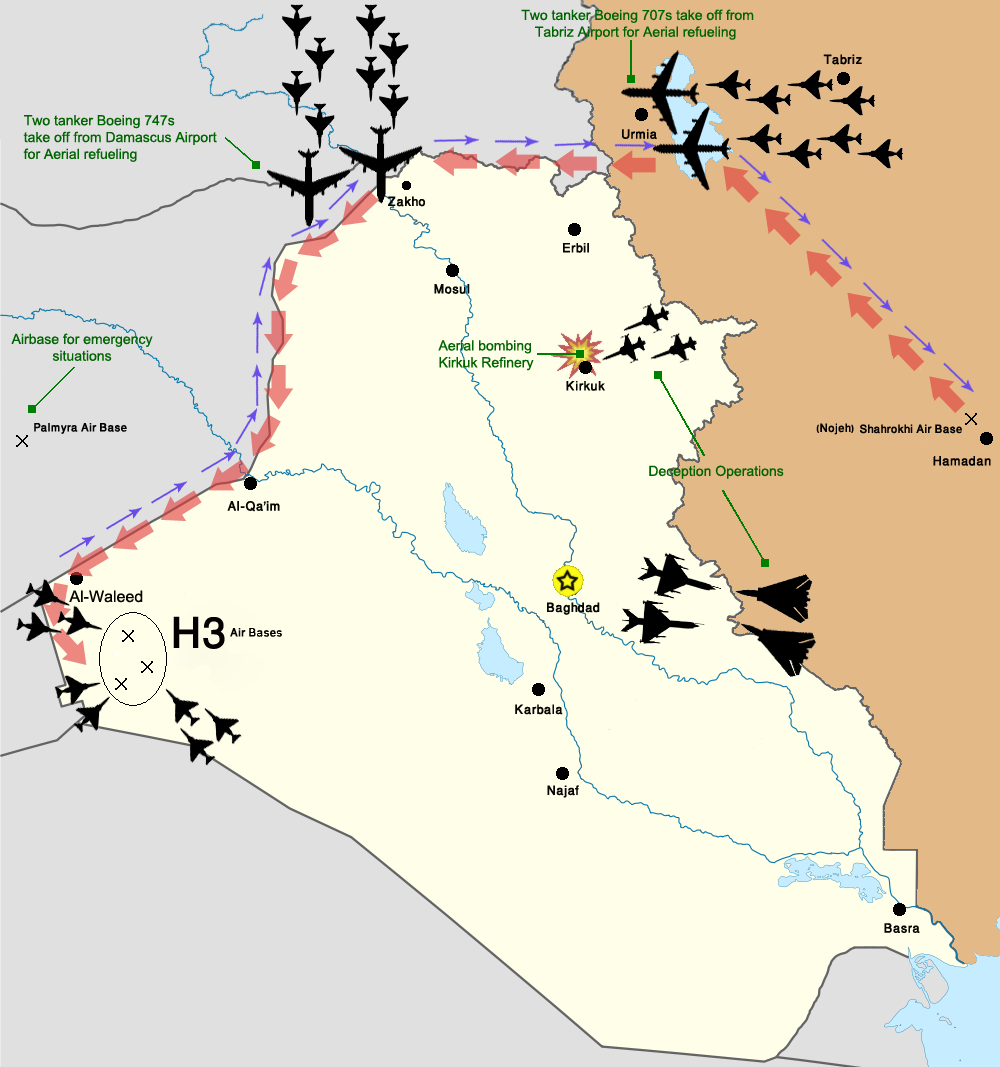
- Operational scope: Strategic
- Location: H-3 Air Base, western Iraq; 32°44′56″N 39°35′29″E
- Planned: Mid-March 1981
- Planned by: Col. Ghasem Golchin; Col. Javad Fakoori; Col. Bahram Hooshyar; Col. Fereidoon Izadseta
- Commanded by: Col. Ghasem Golchin
- Objective: Destruction of the Iraqi Air Force aircraft
- Date: 4 April 1981; 10:30am – 03:30pm (UTC+03:30)
- Executed by: Islamic Republic of Iran Air Force
- Outcome: Iranian victory
- Casualties: 20 killed
- Location of the H-3 complex in Iraq

The H-3 airstrike (Persian: عملیات اچ۳) was a surprise air attack by the Iranian Air Force during the Iran–Iraq War on 4 April 1981 against the Iraqi Air Force's H-3 Air Base in western Iraq. The Iranians destroyed at least 48 Iraqi aircraft on the ground with no losses of their own. Based on the results achieved, it is considered one of the most successful raids in the history of aerial warfare.

== Operation ==
=== The target ===
The H-3 Air Base consists of three parts: H-3 "Main" (also known as Al-Walid, الوليد), H-3 Northwest, and H-3 Southwest. It is located near Al Walid town close to the Baghdad–Amman highway in the Al Anbar desert in western Iraq, near the Jordanian border and 1,000 km from the Iranian border. It was erected to secure the western borders of Iraq and was also used in the Yom Kippur War in 1973.

According to Iraqi sources, during the Iran–Iraq War, it was used as a support airbase for the Iraqi Air Force and housed no more than a few transportation squadrons and a squadron of Mikoyan-Gurevich MiG-21s, as well as retired Hawker Hunters.

The IRIAF had received "credible" reports that Iraq – reinforced by the arrival of large amounts of ammunition and spare parts from Egypt, as well as by the delivery of Mirage F1s from France and Tupolev Tu-22 bombers from the Soviet Union – had been preparing for an imminent major ground and air offensive against Iran. According to Iranian intelligence, the Iraqi Air Force had relocated most of its valuable assets to its Al-Walid air base, located in the H-3 complex. Aerial photographs sent to them by Israelis revealed that the H-3 airfield had more than fifty aircraft of all types scattered across the base in the open, without any protection.

As part of Saddam Hussein's attempts to carry out a successful offensive against Iran on the northern front between 12 and 22 March 1981, Iraq fired two 9K52 Luna-M surface-to-surface rockets against the cities of Dezful and Ahvaz. Within days after this attack, commanders of the 31st and 32nd Tactical Fighter Wing at the Shahrokhi Air Base (TAB 3, near Hamadan) planned a counter-attack to degrade the Iraqi Air Force's capabilities.

=== The attack ===
Being almost 1,500 kilometres from the Iranian fighters at Shahrokhi Air Base, H-3 was out of range and if choosing a direct route, the Iranian aircraft would have had to fly over Baghdad and perform aerial refueling twice in Iraqi airspace, including once near Baghdad, which was heavily fortified by Iraqi air defence sites.

A team of IRIAF commanders (including Col. Ghasem Golchin, Col. Bahram Hooshyar, Major Farajollah Baratpour and Col. Fereydoun Izadseta) planned a more sophisticated, surprise operation instead. Senior Iranian military officials had determined that Iraqi Air Force activity was lower in northern Iraq, so a plan was made to approach the Iraqi sites from that direction. To increase their chances, the Iranian commanders decided to fly their aircraft to Urmia Lake first, refuel in the air, and then from there have a "clean" route passing over the mountains of northern Iraqi–Turkish border, while keeping the altitude at less than 300 ft (100 m) to avoid Iraqi and Turkish radars. The route was around 3,500 km. Nevertheless, the Phantoms could not reach their target without aerial refuelling a number of times.

The 31st and 32nd Tactical Fighter Wings (TFW) employed eight McDonnell Douglas F-4E Phantoms, four Grumman F-14A Tomcats, one Lockheed C-130H Khofaash, a Boeing 747 airborne command post (which was to monitor Iraqi radio communications, and also act as a communication relay between the raiders and the IRIAF HQ), and two tankers (a Boeing 707 and a Boeing 747) for aerial refueling for the attack.

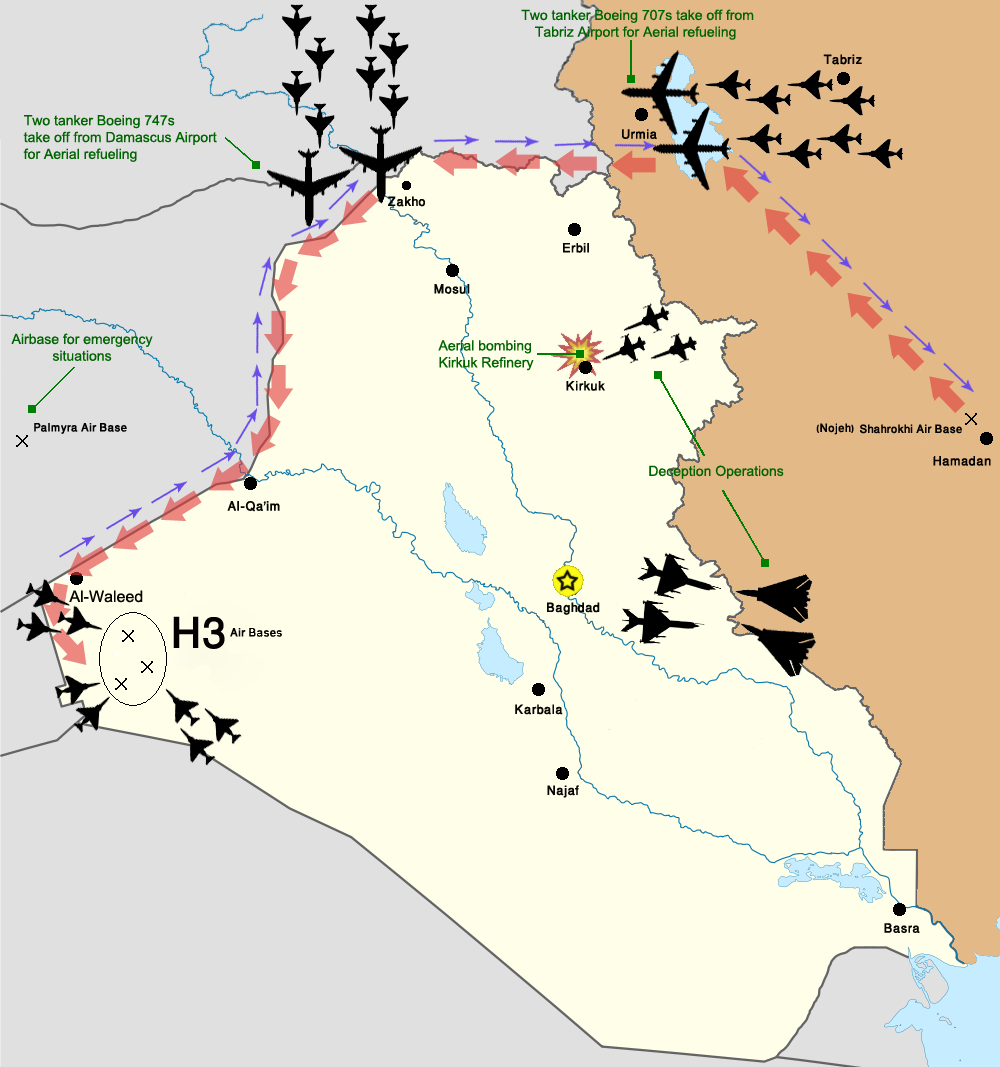
Map of the operation, showing the aircraft involved and their route.

The operation began at 10:30am of 4 April 1981. A formation of eight F-4 Phantoms (including six F-4Es and two F-4Ds), accompanied by two airborne reserves, departed from Hamedan Air Base (TAB 3) and proceeded towards Urmia Lake and then, after refueling in friendly airspace, crossed into Iraq, while the two reserve aircraft returned. A pair of F-14 Tomcats patrolled the area hours before and after the strike began to counter any interception attempts by the Iraqi Air Force. Meanwhile, three Northrop F-5Es from Tabriz Air Base (TFB.2) performed diversionary attacks on Hurriya Air Base near Kirkuk, with unknown results, but certainly distracting Iraqis away from the Phantoms. The C-130H was flying near the Iran–Iraq border. Some time earlier, the two tankers, which already had been sent to Syria, had taken off from a Syrian airport, and then clandestinely diverted from international commercial corridors in total radio silence, while apparently being bound for Iran. Flying at a very low altitude over southern Turkey and eastern Syria, they crossed mountainous northwestern Iraq and finally joined the Phantoms over the western Iraqi desert. Each Phantom refueled four times from the tankers, at an altitude of 300 ft (100 m), which was risky and far below any safety standards (aerial refueling is normally performed at 22,000 ft (6,700 m)). This was done to avoid detection by Iraqi radars; however, the fighters briefly appeared several times on the radars, but were mistaken for Turkish aircraft patrolling the border. Colonel Izadseta supervised the operation from a command Boeing 747 that was in Syria's airspace. The Syrian airport at Palmyra could also be used for possible emergency landing.

While approaching the airbases, the Phantoms split their formation into two groups, Alvand and Alborz. This allowed attacks to come from several directions on the H3 complex. They bombed all three airfields within the H-3 complex. Achieving complete surprise, the fighters made several passes against all three airbases. Both runways at Al-Walid were targeted in order to prevent any Iraqi aircraft from taking off. Cluster bombs of the second group of Phantoms damaged three large hangars. The Phantoms were able to make multiple attacks on multiple targets with cannon fire. By the end of the second group's attack the Iraqi military forces had not responded with a coordinated counter-attack. Effective anti-aircraft fire was also impaired due to the surprise attack. Iraqi aircraft were scrambled in an unsuccessful attempt to intercept the Iranian force.

After the attack, the Iranian formation turned back towards its own bases. Iranian military officials stated that none of the Iranian Phantoms was damaged during the attack.

=== Casualties ===
The IRIAF claimed it destroyed a total of three Antonov An-12BP transports, a Tupolev Tu-16 bomber, four Mikoyan-Gurevich MiG-21s, five Sukhoi Su-20/22s, eight Mikoyan-Gurevich MiG-23s, two Dassault Mirage F1EQs (delivered only weeks earlier) and four helicopters, as well as damaging eleven others beyond repair, including two Tu-16 bombers. Two Iraqi pilots and fourteen personnel were killed, together with three Egyptian and an East German officer, while 19 Iraqis, four Egyptians, and two Jordanians were badly injured. This strike degraded Iraq's capability to retaliate.

According to Iranian intelligence, prior to the attack there were at least two squadrons equipped with ten Tupolev Tu-22B and at least six Tupolev Tu-16 heavy bombers, as well as two other units with MiG-23BNs and Su-20s, which were hidden in the hangars. This has been disputed by Iraqi officials. Iraqi sources claimed that only a single MiG-21 was damaged in the attack; that the damaged hangars were empty at the time of the attack; and that its Tu-22s and Tu-16s were stationed at Tammuz Airbase due to the ongoing war with Iran. Iraq claimed that the bombers were stationed at Tammuz until they were retired from the Iraqi Air Force in the late 1980s, and then were bombed in 1991 during the Gulf War. Iraq denied losses of any Mirage F1s, claiming that all were located in an airbase built specially for them at the request of the French government. The Mirage airbase, called Saddam Airbase, was located approximately 300 kilometers north of Baghdad.

Iraqi air defense command later claimed to have detected the formation coming from the direction of Syria en route to the target, and their radar followed Phantoms for some 67 minutes, although the Iranians achieved total surprise.

== In popular culture ==
The Attack on H3 (حمله به اچ۳), directed by Shahriar Bahrani in 1994, is an Iranian movie depicting the operation.
