= Trita Parsi =

Iranian-Swedish international relations writer and political analyst

- تريتا پارسی
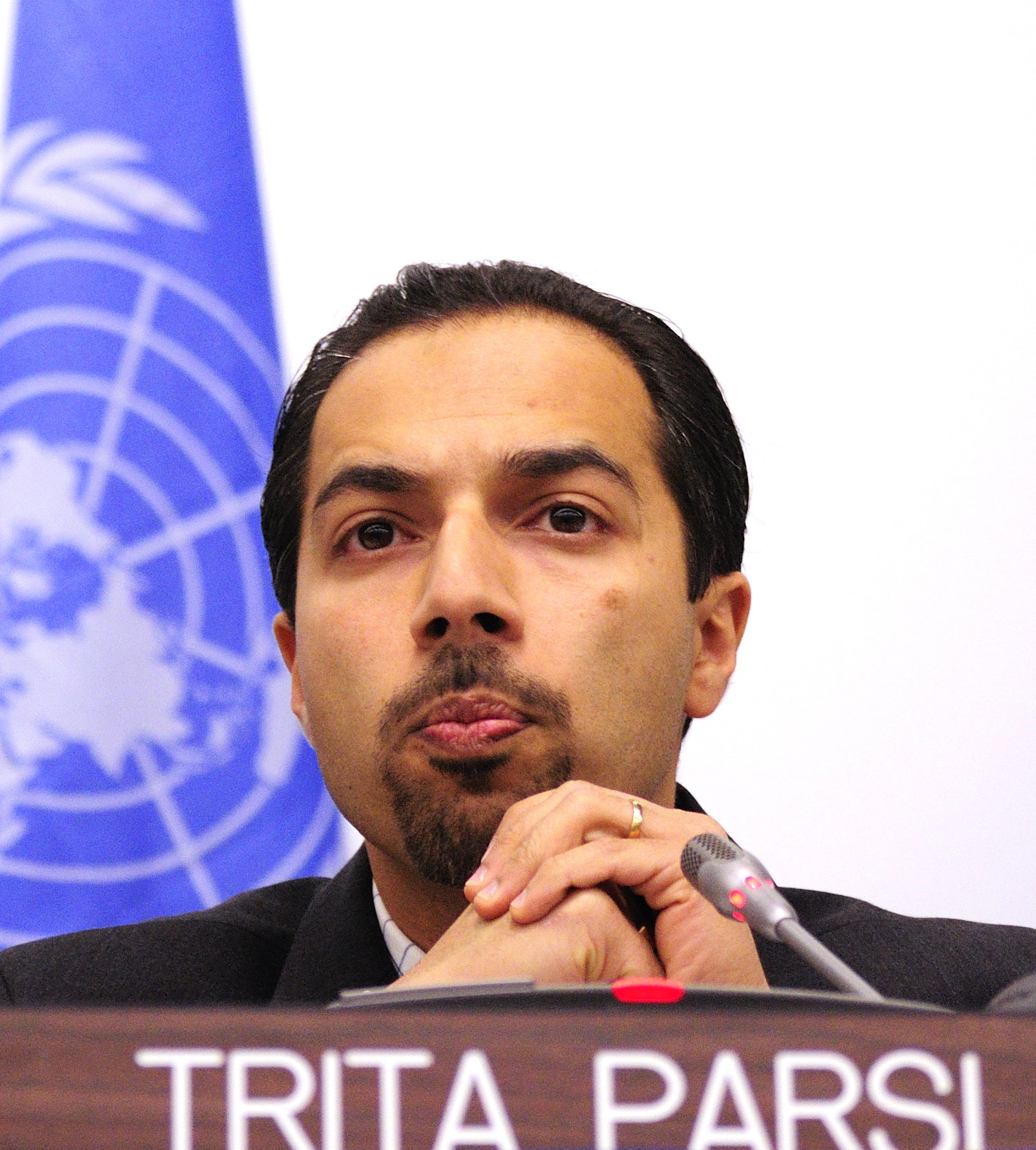
- Parsi in 2010
- Born: Trita Parsi; 1974; Ahvaz, Iran
- Citizenship: Iran; Sweden
- Education: Uppsala University; Stockholm School of Economics; Johns Hopkins University
- Occupations: Writer, political analyst
- Spouse: Amina Semlali
- Children: 3
- Website: tritaparsi.com

Trita Parsi (Persian: تریتا پارسی) is an Iranian-Swedish international relations writer and political analyst who is co-founder and executive vice president of the Quincy Institute for Responsible Statecraft. He is also co-founder and former president of the National Iranian American Council.

He comments on foreign policy in print and on television, and is the author of Treacherous Alliance: The Secret Dealings of Israel, Iran, and the United States (2007), A Single Roll of the Dice: Obama's Diplomacy with Iran (2012) and Losing an Enemy: Obama, Iran, and the Triumph of Diplomacy (2017). With Frida Stranne he also wrote Illusionen om den amerikanska freden (2023), in Swedish. Treacherous Alliance won the Grawemeyer Award for "Ideas Improving World Order" in 2010, and in 2008 it took the silver medal in the Council on Foreign Relations' Arthur Ross Book Award.

== Early life and education ==
Trita Parsi was born in Ahvaz, Iran, to a Zoroastrian family. His father, Touraj Parsi, was a politically active university professor who was jailed under Mohammad Reza Pahlavi and again, after the Iranian Revolution, under Ruhollah Khomeini. Parsi's family left Iran in October 1978, when he was four, and settled in Uppsala in Sweden; his parents were political refugees. Parsi has said that the family did not intend to stay, and that the revolution and the repression which followed it made returning impossible. His elder brother, Rouzbeh Parsi, is a Middle East scholar in Sweden.

Parsi earned a master's degree in international relations at Uppsala University and a second master's degree in economics at the Stockholm School of Economics. He studied foreign policy at the Johns Hopkins University's Nitze School for Advanced International Studies in Washington DC, where he received his Ph.D. in international relations in 2006, under Francis Fukuyama. He was awarded the 2016 Alumni of the Year prize from Uppsala University.

== Career ==
Early in his career, Parsi worked for the Swedish Permanent Mission to the United Nations in New York, where he served in the Security Council, handling the affairs of Afghanistan, Iraq, Tajikistan, and Western Sahara, and on the General Assembly's Third Committee, addressing human rights in Iran, Afghanistan, Myanmar and Iraq.

In 2003, Parsi served as an aide to Representative Bob Ney. Parsi has served as an adjunct professor of international relations at Johns Hopkins University SAIS, an adjunct scholar at the Middle East Institute and as a Policy Fellow at the Woodrow Wilson International Center for Scholars in Washington DC. Georgetown University's Center for Security Studies lists him as an adjunct associate professor.

=== National Iranian American Council ===
In 2002, Parsi founded the National Iranian American Council (NIAC), whose stated purpose is "dedicated to strengthening the voice of Iranian-Americans and promoting greater understanding between the American and Iranian people. We accomplish our mission through expert research and analysis, civic and policy education, and community building." At NIAC's founding, Parsi argued "Our community is educated, affluent, dynamic, and professionally successful. However, we have yet to harness our immense human potential into constructive engagement in American civil society."

Both Trita Parsi and the National Iranian American Council have been accused of having connections to the Iranian government and lobbying on its behalf. Other sources have said such allegations are inaccurate, and that Parsi is a victim of a smear campaign. Parsi has long opposed a war against Iran.

Some critics also see Parsi's advocacy for the protection of Iran's cultural artifacts in the USA as being aligned with the Iranian government, while Parsi counters that such advocacy is done in the interest of Iranian-Americans.

Through NIAC, Parsi supports engagement between the US and Iran, saying it "would enhance our [U.S.] national security by helping to stabilize the Middle East and bolster the moderates in Iran."

In a 2011 talk sponsored by the Institute for Global Law and Policy at the Harvard Law School, Parsi argued that the conflict between Israel and Iran was not ideological but strategic and geopolitical. In a 2012 article for Salon, Parsi accused Israel of using the threat of war to push the U.S. and EU into economic sanctions on Iran.

In February 2026, an unsigned editorial in The Wall Street Journal pointed to a video in which the Tehran University professor Foad Izadi suggests Parsi may have been an Iranian lobbyist, and said that former president Hassan Rouhani had wanted an Iranian lobby in the United States. Parsi responded that NIAC is an Iranian-American organization and has no connections to the Iranian government. NIAC said in reply that Rouhani had made the remark in 2013, eleven years after the organisation was founded, and that Izadi says in the same clip that it would be impossible for Iran to have a lobby in the United States. Jamal Abdi, president of NIAC, said Izadi was an Iranian hardliner who was falsely suggesting a connection between NIAC and Iranian reformists in order to undermine the latter as "American toadies".

==== Lobbying controversy and lawsuit ====
In 2007, Arizona-based Iranian-American blogger Hassan Daioleslam began publicly asserting that NIAC was lobbying on behalf of the Islamic Republic of Iran. Daioleslam wrote in an internal email, "I strongly believe that Trita Parsi is the weakest part of the Iranian web because he is related to Siamak Namazi and Bob Ney... I believe that destroying him will be the start of attacking the whole web. This is an integral part of any attack on Clinton or Obama."

In response, Parsi sued Daioleslam for defamation. In September 2012, a U.S. federal judge John D. Bates threw out the libel suit against Daioleslam on the grounds that "NIAC and Parsi had failed to show evidence of actual malice, either that Daioeslam acted with knowledge the allegations he made were false or with reckless disregard about their accuracy." Bates also wrote, "Nothing in this opinion should be construed as a finding that defendant's articles were true. Defendant did not move for summary judgment on that ground, and it has not been addressed here."

Separately from the merits, the court sanctioned Parsi and NIAC over their conduct during discovery, in which they had failed to produce a range of documents and had not complied with several orders. Bates set the figure at $183,480.09, and in February 2015 the D.C. Circuit upheld most of it, describing the award as "the wages of Appellants' dilatory, dishonest, and intransigent conduct" and reversing two narrower components. The appeal concerned only the sanctions; the dismissal of the case itself was not appealed, and the district court had declined to find that Parsi altered a document in bad faith.

Parsi's work has continued to draw criticism from commentators opposed to engagement with Iran. An opinion piece in Iran International in February 2025 described him as "known for advancing Tehran's talking points".

=== Quincy Institute for Responsible Statecraft ===
Parsi stepped down from NIAC in 2018, and the following year helped found the Quincy Institute for Responsible Statecraft, a foreign policy think tank in Washington, D.C., together with Stephen Wertheim, Eli Clifton, Suzanne DiMaggio and Andrew Bacevich. The institute is named after John Quincy Adams, who as secretary of state said in 1821 that the United States "goes not abroad in search of monsters to destroy", and it argues for restraint in American foreign policy in preference to sanctions and military force. It began publishing in December 2019.

The Open Society Foundations, funded by George Soros, and the Charles Koch Foundation each gave $500,000 towards the launch, and individual donors contributed a further $800,000. Later donors have included the MacArthur Foundation, the Ford Foundation, the Carnegie Corporation of New York and the Rockefeller Brothers Fund.

Parsi is the institute's executive vice president and writes regularly for its online magazine, Responsible Statecraft.

=== Reports about his US residency ===
In June 2026, The Free Press reported that the United States Department of State was considering deporting Parsi. The report cited unnamed officials and documents seen by the paper. The State Department said shortly afterwards that it had "no plans to revoke the green card of Mr. Parsi at this time"; it did not confirm that any investigation existed. Parsi, an Iranian and Swedish citizen who holds permanent residence in the United States, said he did not believe a formal investigation had been opened and described the report as an attempt to provoke one.

== Views ==
=== Nuclear diplomacy and sanctions ===
Parsi has argued for diplomacy with Iran and against broad economic sanctions since the early 2000s. Writing in The New York Review of Books in October 2017, before Trump abandoned the nuclear agreement, he said that "when Iran is solidly adhering to the nuclear accord ... yet Trump still wants to kill the deal, then the problem doesn't lie in Tehran. It lies in Washington", and predicted that years would pass before anyone in Iran's political elite again risked proposing an accommodation with Washington.

He blamed the failure of the 2021–22 talks in Vienna on Washington rather than Tehran, saying in April 2022 that almost every issue had been settled and that the remaining obstacle was Iran's demand that the Islamic Revolutionary Guard Corps be removed from the American list of terrorist organisations. He again warned that the two sides could lose control of the situation while escalating for advantage. In Foreign Policy in February 2026 he wrote that American sanctions had been "deliberately designed to crush that economy and push the population into a state of utter despair", citing estimates that some nine million Iranians left the middle class between 2011 and 2019, against annual growth of six to seven per cent in the years the nuclear agreement was in force.

=== Killing of Qasem Soleimani ===
Parsi called the killing of Qasem Soleimani in January 2020 "an act of war", and said earlier presidents had declined the strike because "they recognized that that would be such a major escalation that it likely would lead to war". His stated concern was a loss of control: even if the Trump administration and the Iranian government both wanted to step back, he said, "they may not be able to do so". Days later he wrote in Foreign Policy that "it seems as if the Middle East's descent into chaos is more likely with the United States than without it."

=== Protests in Iran ===
During the Mahsa Amini protests in 2022 Parsi wrote that the protesters' anger was "immeasurable — and legitimate", and that by blocking reform, narrowing the political spectrum and further limiting freedoms the Iranian government was "literally pushing people to choose revolt over reform". In an opinion piece for MSNBC he described the slogan "Woman, Life, Freedom" as "a brilliant, positive vision for Iran without clerical rule" and said the authorities had chosen to "beat, arrest and even kill the young Iranian women and men who have dared to demand justice". In the same piece he argued that broad economic pressure had made protest more frequent but less likely to succeed, noting that of thirty-five authoritarian states which democratised between 1955 and 2000, only South Africa did so while under comprehensive economic sanctions.

Writing in The Jerusalem Post, Emily Schrader accused NIAC of obscuring human rights violations in Iran and faulted Parsi for arguing for reform rather than regime change, and accused him of colluding with the Iranian regime.

=== Russian invasion of Ukraine ===
In July 2022 Parsi co-signed a statement of the Quincy Institute's position, with Andrew Bacevich and Lora Lumpe, which "categorically" condemned "Russia's illegal invasion of Ukraine" and supported American assistance for Ukrainian self-defence. The statement treated the avoidance of direct conflict between the United States and Russia as the first priority because of the risk of nuclear use, and argued against maximalist aims such as regime change in Moscow.

The institute's handling of the war drew criticism and prompted Joseph Cirincione to resign as a non-resident fellow, saying it was a mistake to treat the invasion as a continuation of American interventionism. Parsi replied that "restrainers are supportive of the idea, by and large, that there should be support for Ukraine. This a country that has been invaded."

=== Gaza war ===
After the Gaza war began in October 2023 Parsi called for an immediate ceasefire and described the Biden administration's approach as a "strategic malpractice of giving Israel a carte blanche" which risked drawing Washington into a wider regional war. Citing American intelligence assessments, he said Tehran had not coordinated the October 7 attacks with Hamas and had been taken by surprise; he also rejected both Iran's claim to exercise no influence over allied armed groups and the view in Washington that it controlled them completely. In The Nation in January 2024 he wrote that it had become clear Benjamin Netanyahu had "never wanted a cease-fire", and in Foreign Policy that April that "a broader war with Iran is exactly what Israeli Prime Minister Benjamin Netanyahu has been seeking for more than two decades."

=== Wars of 2025 and 2026 ===
Parsi opposed the Twelve-Day War between Israel and Iran in June 2025. After the United States bombed Iranian nuclear sites he concluded that the programme had "at best been set back, but certainly not destroyed", while Tehran's determination to acquire a nuclear deterrent had grown, and he called the strikes a blow to the Treaty on the Non-Proliferation of Nuclear Weapons. In Foreign Policy that August he argued that the war had strengthened the Iranian government by uniting the population against an attack from outside.

He also opposed the 2026 Iran war. In March 2026, writing with George Beebe, he set out terms for ending it: in return for Iranian commitments to stop attacks, to renew its pledge not to build nuclear weapons and to reopen the Strait of Hormuz, the United States would offer sanctions exemptions to countries prepared to finance Iran's reconstruction.

== Books ==
=== Treacherous Alliance ===
In 2007, Yale University Press published Treacherous Alliance: The Secret Dealings of Israel, Iran, and the United States. The book is an expansion of his 2006 Ph.D. dissertation written at Johns Hopkins University under the supervision of his Ph.D. adviser Francis Fukuyama. The book "takes a closer look at the complicated triangular relations [among] Israel, Iran, and the United States that continue to shape the future of the Middle East." The book argues that the struggle between Israel and Iran is not ideological but strategic. An Arabic translation by Amin al-Ayyoubi was published in Beirut in 2008 as Hilf al-masalih al-mushtaraka.

In Foreign Affairs, L. Carl Brown called the book a "well-constructed history", and former U.S. ambassador Peter Galbraith praised the book as "a wonderfully informative account." The book was also praised by political scientist John Mearsheimer and former National Security Advisor Zbigniew Brzezinski, who was on his dissertation committee. In 2008, Treacherous Alliance was awarded the silver medal (runner-up) in the Council on Foreign Relations' Arthur Ross Book Award.

Reviewing the book in Commentary in March 2008, Nathan Thrall was skeptical of the praise heaped on this book by authorities in American foreign policy and Middle East studies. He disagreed with Parsi's contention that the internal dynamics of states (i.e., their ideology, system of governance, ethnic makeup, class structure, and religion) have little or no impact on their foreign policies. Thrall suggested that in propounding such a thesis, Parsi, "the head of a lobby promoting 'greater understanding' of Iran," may just be "doing his job. But the distinction between arriving at a conclusion and beginning with one is what separates the work of a historian from that of a lobbyist. In this case, it is a distinction that seems to be lost not only on him but on the luminaries who have lined up to endorse his defective scholarship and tendentious conclusions."

Treacherous Alliance received the 2010 Grawemeyer Award from the University of Louisville, given for "Ideas Improving World Order." Treacherous Alliance also won the 2008 Arthur Ross Silver Medallion from the Council on Foreign Relations, which described it as a "unique and important book" that "takes a closer look at the complicated triangular relations between Israel, Iran, and the United States that continue to shape the future of the Middle East."

In a 2011 interview with the Institute for Global Law and Policy at Harvard University, Parsi asserted that his thesis had "been vindicated" by recent events. "I believe it is increasingly clear that efforts to divide the region between moderates vs radicals, democracies vs non-democracies etc is of little utility and has no real explanatory value. Israel, for instance, who had sought to frame its rivalry with Iran as a struggle between the region's sole Western democracy against a fanatical Islamic tyranny, favored the status quo in Egypt and opposed the efforts to oust Mubarak." He added that "With the decline of the US, Israel's strategic paralysis and increased isolation in the region, the rise of Turkey, the 'revolutions' in Tunisia and Egypt, and Iran's continued difficulties in translating its strength to regional acceptance, the region is experiencing momentous changes both in its political structure and in its balance of power. An ideology-based approach towards understanding these shifts won't get you far."

=== A Single Roll of the Dice: Obama's Diplomacy with Iran ===
In the 2012 book, Parsi's thesis is that US-Iran relations are in a stalemate caused by institutionalized enmity: "The thirty-year-old US-Iran enmity is no longer a phenomenon; it is an institution." He argues that the way forth is through sustained diplomacy that he considers "the only policy that remains largely unexplored and that has a likelihood of achieving results amounting to more than kicking the can down the road."

Julian Borger wrote in The Guardian that A Single Roll of the Dice is "A carefully balanced and thoroughly researched account of the tortured US-Iranian relationship in recent years." L. Carl Brown from Foreign Affairs said the book is "the most incisive account available... eminently readable, sometimes gripping."

Reviewing the book in The Wall Street Journal, Sohrab Ahmari faults Parsi for failing to "re-examine U.S. policy and its underlying assumptions." Instead, he writes, "Quick to ascribe irrationality and bad faith to opponents of engagement, Mr. Parsi is charitable when it comes to examining the motivations of the Iranian side." In opposition to Parsi's position, Ahmari concludes, "Mr. Obama's engagement policy failed not because of Israeli connivance or because the administration did not try hard enough. The policy failed because the Iranian regime, when confronted by its own people or by outsiders, has only one way of responding: with a truncheon."

Foreign Affairs included the book among its best books of 2012 on the Middle East.

=== Losing an Enemy ===
Yale University Press published Losing an Enemy: Obama, Iran, and the Triumph of Diplomacy in August 2017. It recounts the negotiations that produced the Joint Comprehensive Plan of Action, concluded in Vienna on 14 July 2015. Parsi argues that sanctions did not produce the agreement, and that the breakthrough came instead when the Obama administration gave up its insistence on zero enrichment, a shift he calls "the Concession". He also argues that the deal's opponents feared Iran's political rehabilitation more than its nuclear programme.

H-Diplo/ISSF published a roundtable on the book in January 2018. Gary Sick wrote that "if journalism is the first draft of history, then Trita Parsi's account of the negotiation of the Iran nuclear deal ... is a solid second draft", and that those who see the agreement as a mistake "will regard Parsi's account as a whitewash. They will be wrong." Robert Gallucci called it "a good book" but faulted Parsi for dismissing concerns about the precedent set on enrichment. Michael Singh, managing director of the Washington Institute for Near East Policy and a critic of the agreement, took the opposite view, writing that "the book is not truly a work of history or analysis, but rather an effort to persuade". Singh accepted that Parsi "persuasively details how key concessions by the Obama administration were instrumental in securing a deal", but held that his case against sanctions "relies almost exclusively on the testimony of Iranian officials, who have a clear interest in promoting that view".

A Persian translation by Fatemeh-Sadat Mousavi Karimi was published as Dastan-e yek tavafoq by Setak in Tehran.

=== Illusionen om den amerikanska freden ===
Parsi's fourth book, Illusionen om den amerikanska freden ("The illusion of the American peace"), was written in Swedish with Frida Stranne and published by Ordfront in 2023. It argues that the peace Western Europe believes it has enjoyed since 1945 rested on repeated American intervention elsewhere, and that a hawkish foreign policy establishment tightened its hold in Washington after the Cold War ended rather than loosening it.

Swedish reviewers were largely hostile, chiefly over the authors' contention that the war in Ukraine might have been avoided had NATO ruled out Ukrainian membership. Björn Werner wrote in Svenska Dagbladet that the book failed to convince, and Henrik Berggren argued in Dagens Nyheter that in ascribing an almost omnipotent role to the United States it treated Russian imperialism as though it were not an independent force. Writing in Arbetaren the following year, the criminologist Janne Flyghed defended the book, noting that the authors condemn the Russian invasion in several passages and that Ukraine occupies less than a tenth of the text.

== Personal life ==
Parsi is an Iranian-Swedish dual national and a permanent resident of the United States. He is fluent in Persian, English, and Swedish.

He is married to Amina Semlali, a polyglot of Swedish and Moroccan origin who specializes in behavioral economics and human development, formerly with the World Bank.

Semlali holds a master's degree in political science from Uppsala University. in Sweden and Sorbonne University in Paris, France.

Parsi and Semlali have three children together.

== Publications ==
- Parsi, Trita (2007). Treacherous Alliance: The Secret Dealings of Israel, Iran, and the United States. Yale University Press. ISBN 978-0300120578.
- — (2012). A Single Roll of the Dice: Obama's Diplomacy with Iran. Yale University Press. ISBN 978-0300169362.
- — (2017). Losing an Enemy: Obama, Iran, and the Triumph of Diplomacy. Yale University Press. ISBN 978-0300218169.
