= Ahmad Khaleghi Damghani =

Iranian political scientist and author (born 1958)

- Born: 1958 (age 67–68)
- Occupations: Political scientist, author

Ahmad Khaleghi Damghani (Persian: احمد خالقی دامغانی, born 1958) is an Iranian political scientist and author. He holds PhD in Political Science (Political Thoughts), from the University of Tehran. His interests and researches focused on contemporary Western Political Philosophy, Continental philosophy and Iranian Contemporary Politics. He is an associate professor at the Department of Political Science at Faculty of Law and Political Science at University of Tehran, Tehran, Iran.

== Selected publications ==
- Power, Language and Ordinary Life in Contemporary Political-Philosophical Discourse (Gam-e No, 2003).
- Political forces and the National Movement (Gam-e No, 2005).
- Lectures On "Being and Time" (Game-No, 2006).
- Globalization of Capital (Gam-e No, 2006).
- Ahmad, Khaleghi Damghani; Hamid, Malekzade (2015). "Politics, Paidea and the State: The Political and Its Inter-Subjective Foundation". Allameh Tabataba'i University. 1 (2): 136–166. doi:10.22054/TSSQ.2015.1808.
- Ahmad, Khaleghi Damghani (2008). "Reform Era in Iranian Politics". Tarbiat Modares University Press. 15 (1): 34–54.
- Ahmad, Khaleghi Damghani; Hamid, Malekzade (2021). "The Materialist Foundations of Politics: A Critique of the Book "State and Civil Society"". Critical Studies in Texts & Programs of Human Sciences and Council for the Study of Humanities Texts and Books. 21 (6): 305–329. doi:10.30465/CRTLS.2021.23290.1459.
- Damghani, Ahmad Khaleghi; Malekzade, Hamid (2020). "Book Review: Against Liberalism, on a repercussive critics on Liberalism". Critical Studies in Texts & Programs of Human Sciences. 20 (83): 301–323. ISSN 2383-1294.
- Damghani, Ahmad Khaleghi; Mehdi, Nasr (2013). "THE ACHIEVEMENTS OF HEIDEGGER S PHENOMENOLOGY IN HUMAN SCIENCES AND POLITICAL RESEARCH". Political Quarterly. 43 (1): 3–23. ISSN 1735-9678.
- Ahmad, Khaleghi Damghani (2006). "Iranian Social Structure and its Cohesions and Cleavages: From the Constitutional Revolution to the Islamic Revolution". National Studies. 7 (4): 61. ISSN 1735-059X.
- Ahmad, Khaleghi Damghani (2018). "Research on the concept of Tradition in the thought of Javad Tabatabai". Political Quarterly. 47 (4): 891–907. ISSN 1735-9678.
