= International Union of Virtual Media =

International Union of Virtual Media or IUVM is Iranian internet group that aims and seeks to influence the internet users and behind big misinformation campaign. The group operates in more than 11 important languages including English, Spanish, French, Arabic, Russian, Persian, Urdu, Pashto and Turkish.

Several social media platforms such as Facebook Inc, Twitter Inc and Alphabet Inc, the parent company of Google, shut down some accounts and sites related to this Iranian group.

The group is linked directly to the conservative Iranian regime. The group is behind worldwide misinformation campaign aiming to influence the result of the election of other countries and used to attack Israel and Saudi Arabia.
