= Ali-Mohammad Zanganeh =

Iranian politician, Governor of Golestan Province (2021–present)

- علی‌محمد زنگانه

Governor of Golestan Province
- In office 21 November 2021 – November 2024
- President: Ebrahim Raisi
- Preceded by: Hadi Haqshenas
- Succeeded by: Ali-Asghar Tahmasbi

Personal details
- Born: Ali-Mohammad Zanganeh Iran
- Party: Non-partisan
- Occupation: Politician, provincial administrator

Ali-Mohammad Zanganeh (علی‌محمد زنگانه) is an Iranian politician who served as the Governor of Golestan Province from November 2021. Zanganeh was appointed as governor by the Minister of Interior under the administration of President Ebrahim Raisi. He was succeeded as governor in November 2024 by Ali-Asghar Tahmasbi.
