= Michael Swaine =

Michael Swain(e) may refer to:

- Michael D. Swaine (born 1951), American author and expert in China security studies and senior associate at the Carnegie Endowment for International Peace
- Michael Swaine (technical author), American technical author and co-author of book which inspired movie Pirates of Silicon Valley
- Michael Swaine (artist), Futurefarmers artist and activist
- Mike Swain (born 1960), judoka
