= Majid Zamani =

Majid Zamani, is an Iranian political activist and entrepreneur, known for taking part in many international discussions concerning Iran's political future and governance.

== Early life and education ==
Majid Zamani completed his studies in the USA. He worked at the World Bank, returning to Iran in 2007. On June 23, 2007, he was arrested for accusations of acting against national security, insulting the president and collecting information with the intention of delivering it to foreign hands. His studies and employment in the US, were also held against him. He was released after five months, in November on bail. The charges against him were dropped, but to this day he faces a charge of "disturbing public order".

== Career ==
Zamani is an entrepreneur and political activist involved and contributing to discussion related to Iran's governance and reform. He has participated in many international academic and political events. In 2023, he was a speaker at the Stanford University program about Iran's transition to secular democracy. He participated an event of the Atlantic Council about corruption in Iran.

== Political and civic involvement ==
Mazid Zamani is known for his activity among the Iranian diaspora and civic rights actors regarding political transition in Iran. As part of his activity he is the executive director of the Iran Freedom Congress - a civic initiative established in early 2026. The Iran Freedom Congress is a non governing forum for dialogue, where Iranian political and civil groups to meet and discuss moving beyond the current political system in Iran.

== See also ==
- Politics of Iran
- Masha Amini protest
- National Iranian American Council
