= Arthur Berney =

American legal scholar

Arthur L. Berney (August 12, 1930 – March 31, 2020) was an American legal scholar who was a professor emeritus at the Boston College Law School. Berney taught courses in constitutional law, communications, and National Security Law. He died at his home in Cambridge, Massachusetts, on March 31, 2020, at the age of 89.

== Works ==
- With Stephen Dycus, William C. Banks and Peter Raven-Hansen. National Security Law. 4th ed. New York: Aspen Publishers/Wolters Kluwer Law & Business, 2007.
- With Stephen Dycus, William C. Banks and Peter Raven-Hansen. National Security Law. 3rd ed. New York: Aspen Law & Business, 2002. (Accompanied by 2004-2005 Supplement. New York: Aspen Publishers, 2004.)
- "Repeal Drug Prohibition and End the Financing of International Crime." In Global Organized Crime and International Security, edited by Emilio C. Viano, 173–183. Aldershot; Brookfield, U.S.A.: Ashgate, 1999.
- With Stephen Dycus, William C. Banks and Peter Raven-Hansen. National Security Law. 2nd ed. Boston: Little, Brown and Co., 1997.
- "Cocaine Prohibition: Drug-Induced Madness in the Western Hemisphere." Boston College Third World Law Journal. 15 (Winter 1995): 19–76.
- With Stephen Dycus, William C. Banks and Peter Raven-Hansen, National Security Law. Boston: Little, Brown & Co., 1990.
- With Gerald Tishler, Irwin Cotler, Alan M. Dershowitz, Nancy Ackerman and Ruti Teitel. "Freedom of Speech and Holocaust Denial." Cardozo Law Review 8 (February 1987): 559–594. [Edited version appears as "When Academic Freedom and Freedom of Speech Confront Holocaust Denial and Group Libel: Comparative Perspectives." Boston College Third World Law Journal 8 (Winter 1988): 65–90.]
- "The Justiciability of the FAS Proposal." In First Use of Nuclear Weapons: Under the Constitution, Who Decides? edited by Peter Raven-Hansen, 195–210. New York: Greenwood Press, 1987.
- Introduction to Mass media, Freedom of Speech, and Advertising, by Daniel Morgan Rohrer, xv-xvi. Dubuque, IA: Kendall/Hunt Publishing Co., 1979.
- With Stephen J. Buchbinder. "Constitutional Law." Annual Survey of Massachusetts Law 22 (1975): 257–311.
- With Harry A. Pierce. "An Evaluative Framework of Legal Aid Models." Washington University Law Quarterly, 1975, no. 1: 5-43.
- With Joseph Goldberg, John A. Dooley, III, and David W. Carroll. Legal Problems of the Poor: Cases and Materials. Boston: Little, Brown & Co., 1975.
- "Legal Aid: A Constitutional Imperative." In Law and Poverty: Cases and Materials, edited by L. M. Singhvi, 331–336. Bombay, India: N.M. Tripathi, 1973.
- With Russell B. Sunshine. "Basic Legal Education in India: An Empirical Study of the Student Perspective at Three Law Colleges." Journal of the Indian Law Institute 12 (January–March 1970): 39-118.
- "The Lawyer, Developing Nations and Legal Aid: A Proposal." All India Reporter, 1970, 53–61.
- "Libel and the First Amendment - A New Constitutional Privilege." Virginia Law Review 51 (January 1965): 1-58.
- "Criminal Law, Procedure and Administration." Annual Survey of Massachusetts Law 11 (1964): 137–153.
