= Jeanne Morefield =

Political theorist

Jeanne Morefield (born 1967) is associate professor of Political Theory and Fellow at New College, Oxford. She is also a Non-Residential Fellow at the Quincy Institute for Responsible Statecraft, Washington DC.

== Books ==
- Covenants Without Swords: Idealist Liberalism and the Spirit of Empire (Princeton, 2005)
- Empires Without Imperialism: Anglo American Decline and the Politic of Deflection (Oxford, 2014)
- Unsettling the World: Edward Said and Political Theory (Rowman and Littlefield, 2022)
