= Iran Freedom Congress =

The Iran Freedom Congress, previously known as the Dialogue for Iran, is a political and civic initiative uniting Iranian opposition key, activists, professional and political figures to discuss the future governance and political transition of Iran. The first congress meeting is scheduled for March 28-29 in London, United Kingdom.

== Background ==
Iranian opposition has divided been for decades, consisting of diverse ideological groups including republicans, monarchists, and various civic society movements. Following the Iranian protests, caused by a national unrest over economic crisis, political repression, calls for government change, answered by a harsh government reaction, Iranian diaspora decided to establish the Iran Freedom Congress. The purpose is to create a unified platform for all segments to properly dialogue and coordinate actions during a time of political instability and uncertainty.

== History ==
In February 2026, a forum of dozens of notable Iranian opposition figures had preliminary meeting in London. Following the discussions a formal announcement was made of the establishment of the Iran Freedom Congress, a platform to expand participation among all political, social, ethnic and professional fractions.

== Objectives ==
The Iran Freedom Congress, has set several main objectives, it wants to achieve:

- Encourage discussions about Iran's future after the Islamic Republic.
- Promote democratic governance, pluralism and human rights.
- Increase cooperation between diverse opposition factions
- Create a framework for a potential transitional political system.

The congress has highlighted the importance of open participation and active public involvement in shaping Iran's future, while aiming to avoid both internal dictatorship and solutions imposed from outside.

== Structure and participation ==
The Iran Freedom Congress is more of a forum rather than a governing body. Among the participants are leading individuals from:

- Political opposition.
- Civil society organizations.
- Lawyer and human rights activists.
- Economic and financial experts.
- Media influencers.
- Ethnic leaders.

== Significance ==
The Iran Freedom Congress is described as one of the most significant efforts to unite the Iranian diaspora and opposition in attempt to create a mutual framework for political transition. Its importance stand out more due to the ongoing instability in Iran as the 2026 Iran war continues.

In March 2026, the Middle East Eye reported that the Iran Freedom Congress was promoted by members of AIPAC. Majid Zamani, the executive director of the IFC, denied that the group was supported by foreign government or organisation, stating that, "any suggestion that a foreign government or organisation is playing a role in shaping the IFC is incorrect."

== See also ==
- 2025–2026 Iranian protests
- National Iranian American Council
- Majid Zamani
- Iranian opposition
