= Aziz Rana =

American legal scholar

- Education: Harvard University (AB, PhD); Yale University (JD)
- Occupations: Legal scholar; author
- Spouse: Odette Lienau
- Website: www.azizrana.com

Aziz Rana is an American legal scholar and author who is a Provost’s Distinguished Fellow and the J. Donald Monan, S.J., University Professor of Law and Government at Boston College Law School, specializing in American constitutional law.

== Education ==
Rana received his A.B. from Harvard College and his Juris Doctor from Yale Law School, where he was an Oscar M. Ruebhausen Fellow in Law. He returned to Harvard for his Ph.D. in political science, where his dissertation received the Charles Sumner Prize.

== Work ==
Rana is best known for his 2010 dissertation-based book The Two Faces of American Freedom, a synthesis of United States legal–political history from British colonization.

He sits on the Council on Foreign Relations, is a non-resident fellow at the Quincy Institute for Responsible Statecraft, and is an editorial board member of both Dissent magazine and Just Security.

In 2022, Rana joined the faculty of Boston College Law School, where his wife was an incoming dean. Before that, he was the Richard and Lois Cole Professor of Law at Cornell Law School.

== Bibliography ==
- The Two Faces of American Freedom. Cambridge: Harvard University Press, 2010. ISBN 978-0674048973
- Reclaiming Freedom. Haymarket Books, 2024. ISBN 978-1946511805
- The Constitutional Bind: How Americans Came to Idolize a Document That Fails Them. University of Chicago Press, 2024. ISBN 978-0226350721
