= National Iranian American Council =

Pro-Iran lobbying entity in the United States

- Abbreviation: NIAC
- Formation: January 2002; 24 years ago
- Founders: Trita Parsi, Babak Talebi, Farzin Illich
- Headquarters: Washington, D.C., United States
- President: Jamal Abdi
- Website: www.niacouncil.org

The National Iranian American Council (NIAC) is an American lobby dedicated to the pursuit of what it describes as the interests of Iranians and Iranian Americans.

NIAC's first president, Trita Parsi, is the group's co-founder. As of 2018, the organization's president was Jamal Abdi. NIAC Action PAC is its affiliated political action committee and was formed in 2015.

NIAC has lobbied against the initiation of military conflicts by the United States against Iran and for an end to sanctions on Iran. It supported the Joint Comprehensive Plan of Action agreement between Iran and the United States in 2015 that gave Iran sanctions relief in exchange for Iran's pledge not to develop a nuclear weapon. NIAC's activities have been controversial, with various political figures and commentators, as well as some members of the Iranian diaspora, labeling it a front for the Iranian government. NIAC members dispute the accusations, citing their criticism of the Iranian government's human rights abuses.

== History ==
NIAC was founded in 2002 by Trita Parsi, Babak Talebi, and Farzin Illich to promote Iranian-American relations.

=== Obama administration ===
During the Obama administration, NIAC advocated for the Iran nuclear deal, along with J Street and the Arab American Institute. The deal stated that the US would ease sanctions on Iran in exchange for Iran reducing its nuclear program. The Congressional publication, The Hill, cited the work of NIAC, J Street, and the Arms Control Association in support of the deal as one of the "Top lobbying victories of 2015."

In 2007, Arizona-based Iranian-American journalist Seid Hassan Daioleslam began publicly asserting that NIAC was lobbying for Iran. In response, Parsi and NIAC sued him for defamation. In 2012, Parsi's lawsuit was dismissed by the court on summary judgment. In 2015, NIAC was monetarily sanctioned by two circuit judges and a senior circuit judge in favour of Daioleslam.

=== First Trump administration ===
NIAC criticized President Donald Trump's Executive Order 13769, which restricted visas for travelers from 6 majority-Muslim countries, as biased and ineffective in fighting terrorism. They joined three other Iranian-American organizations in a lawsuit against the order. After Trump did not recertify the Iran nuclear deal, Parsi criticized the decision, stating that the IAEA had repeatedly verified that Iran had been following the deal. After Secretary of State Mike Pompeo threatened Iran with extreme sanctions, Parsi stated that Trump was attempting to instigate war with Iran.

In 2019, the U.S. Department of State Global Engagement Center (GEC) provided funding to the Iran Disinformation Project, which organized social media campaigns alleging that journalists, activists, and others were supporting the Iranian government. Their campaign against NIAC included promoting the hashtag #NIACLobbies4Mullahs. After the Iran Disinformation Project was accused of harassment, GEC withdrew its funding and Director Lea Gabrielle stated that the campaign against NIAC had not been approved by GEC.

In July 2019, a group of Iranian Americans protested outside NIAC's office in Washington, D.C., saying that the organization represented the Iranian government rather than the Iranian people.

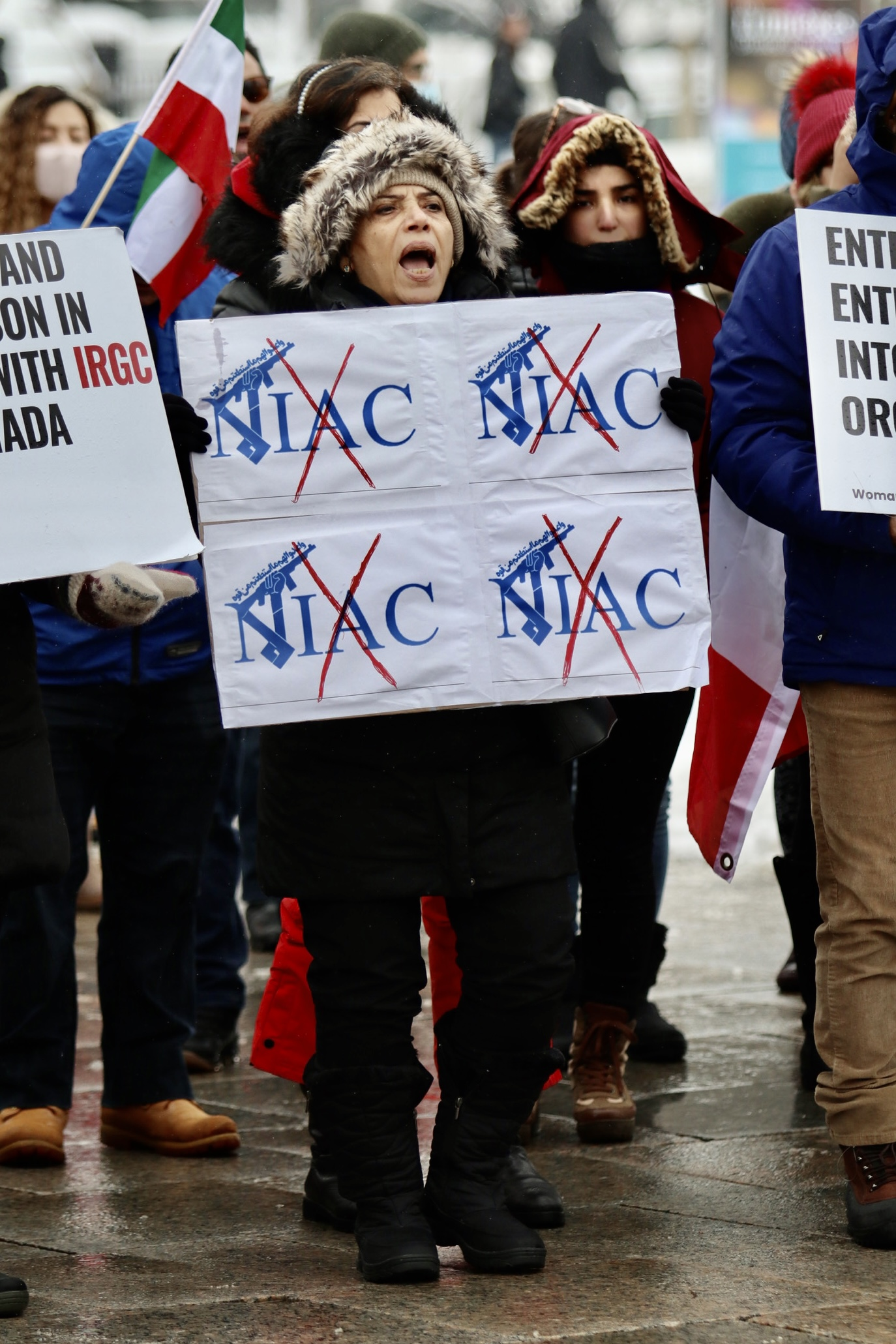
A sign criticizing the NIAC at a Woman Life Freedom protest in Ottawa, December 2022.

In January 2020, Republican senators Tom Cotton, Ted Cruz and Mike Braun stated that NIAC and its sister organization NIAC Action violated the Foreign Agents Registration Act (FARA) and requested US Attorney-General William Barr investigate. The US government has not publicly taken any such action against NIAC.

=== Biden administration ===
The 2022 Women, Life, Freedom protests in Iran exacerbated tensions between NIAC and its critics. Some activists criticized NIAC's statements in support of the protests as insincere and accused NIAC of supporting policies beneficial to the Iranian government.

== Funding ==
NIAC has a 100% rating from Charity Navigator and a Platinum Seal of Transparency by Guidestar. NIAC has over 8,000 donors including Iranian-American individuals and American foundations and does not receive funds from the Iranian government nor the United States government.

== Policy positions ==
=== Sanctions on Iran ===
NIAC takes a negative view of broad economic sanctions against Iran, considering them counterproductive because their impact on Iranian citizens' financial security hinders efforts to organize against the Iranian government. Instead, NIAC advocates for targeted sanctions of specific Iranian government officials. A 2014 NIAC report concluded that U.S. sanctions on Iran cost the U.S. economy between $135 billion and $175 billion in lost export revenue between 1995 and 2012. A US Treasury Department spokesperson stated that this accounted for 1% of the US economy and was worthwhile to prevent Iran from gaining nuclear weapons. The organization led campaigns to lift sanctions that blocked humanitarian organizations from providing disaster relief to Iranians, and helped remove sanctions on online communication tools like Facebook and YouTube.

== See also ==
- AIPAC
- Quincy Institute
- Iran–United States relations
- Iran Freedom Congress
