= Boston College Law School =

Private law school in Newton, Massachusetts, US

Coordinates: 42°20′31″N 71°11′36″W

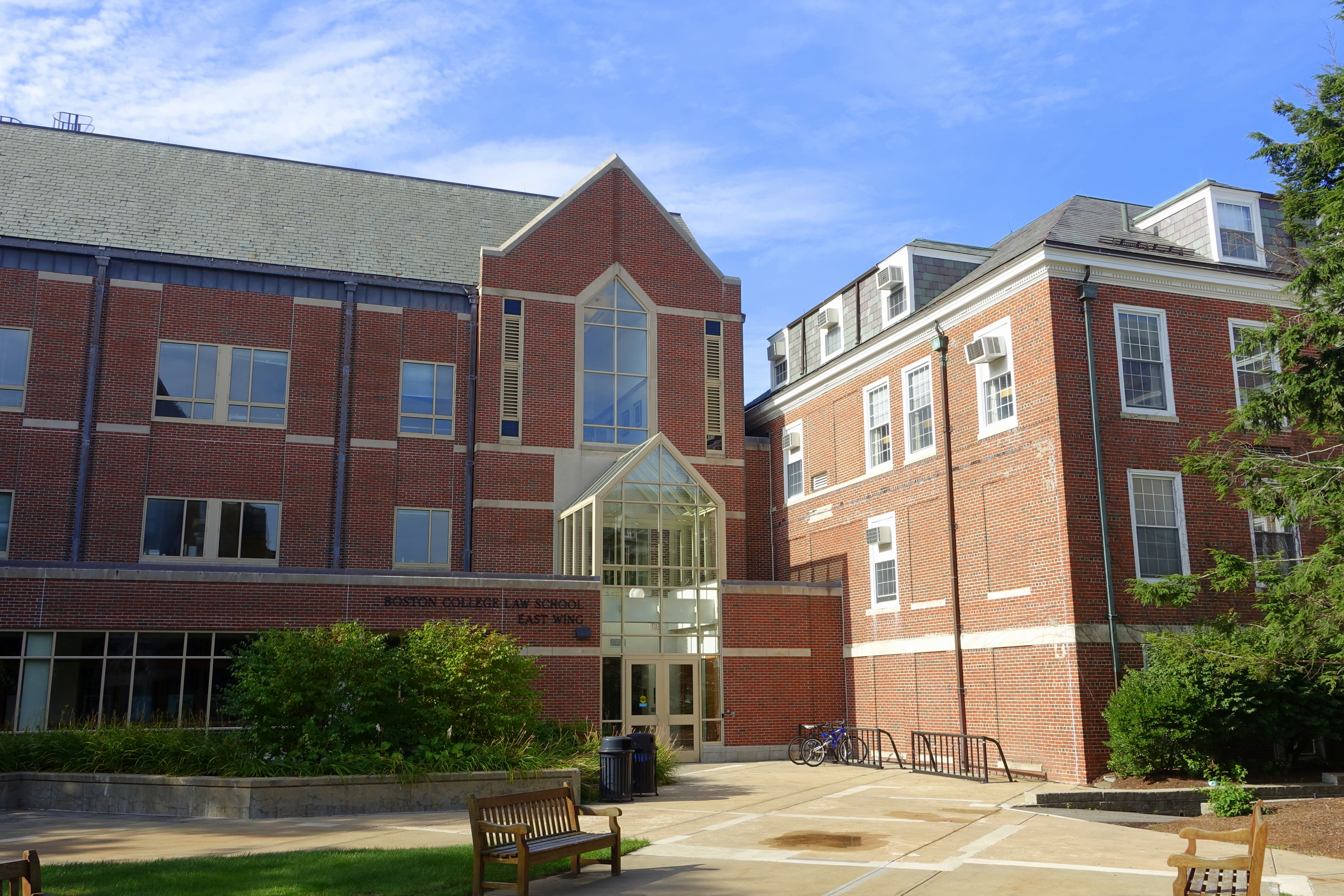
- Motto: Αἰέν ἀριστεύειν "Ever to excel"
- Parent school: Boston College
- Religious affiliation: Roman Catholic (Jesuit)
- Established: 1929
- School type: Private law school
- Parent endowment: $3.8 billion (2021)
- Dean: Odette Lienau
- Location: Newton Centre, Massachusetts, U.S.
- Enrollment: 634 (2024)
- Faculty: 82 (full-time); 138 (part-time)
- USNWR ranking: 20th (2026)
- Bar pass rate: 93.82% (2024 first-time takers)
- Website: bc.edu/law
- ABA profile: Standard 509 Report

Boston College Law School (BC Law) is the law school of Boston College, a private Jesuit research university in Chestnut Hill, Massachusetts. It is situated on a 40-acre (160,000 m^{2}) campus in Newton, Massachusetts, about 1.5 miles (2.4 km) from the university's main campus in Chestnut Hill.

The law school has approximately 650 students and 80 full-time faculty members. BC Law has programs in human rights, social justice, and public interest law, as well as programs in business law and innovation, law and public policy, and criminal and civil litigation.

== History ==
Although provisions for a law school were included in Boston College's original charter, ratified by the General Court of the Commonwealth of Massachusetts in 1863, Boston College Law School was formally organized later in 1929. Previously, promising Boston College graduates interested in a legal education were encouraged to seek admission to Harvard Law School, as attested by the law school's inaugural faculty of whom 11 out of 17 members held degrees from both universities. BC Law's founder, John B. Creeden SJ, formerly president of Georgetown University, served as its first regent and alumnus Dennis A. Dooley as its first dean.

On September 26, 1929, BC Law opened its doors in the 11-story Lawyer's Building on Beacon Street opposite the Massachusetts State House in downtown Boston. From a pool of nearly 700 applicants, 102 day and evening division students had been selected. So rigorous were the school's academic standards that 50% of the first class eventually dropped out or flunked out. However, just three years later, the school received American Bar Association accreditation, joining Harvard, Yale, and Boston University as the only law schools in New England to attain that distinction; accreditation by the Association of American Law Schools followed in 1937.

Women were admitted to the school by 1940, when enrollment had surpassed 350 students. In 1954, the school moved to St. Thomas More Hall on the edge of the main Chestnut Hill campus and to its present 40-acre (160,000 m^{2}) Newton campus, the home of the former Newton College of the Sacred Heart, in 1975. Today, the law campus includes Stuart House, an administrative building; lecture halls; seminar spaces; a dining hall; conference space; and a law library that includes the Daniel R. Coquillette Rare Book Room.

== Academics ==
=== Admissions ===
For the class entering in 2024, 13.27% of applicants were admitted with 26.20% of admitted students enrolling. The average enrollee had an LSAT score of 167 and a GPA of 3.80.

=== Curriculum ===
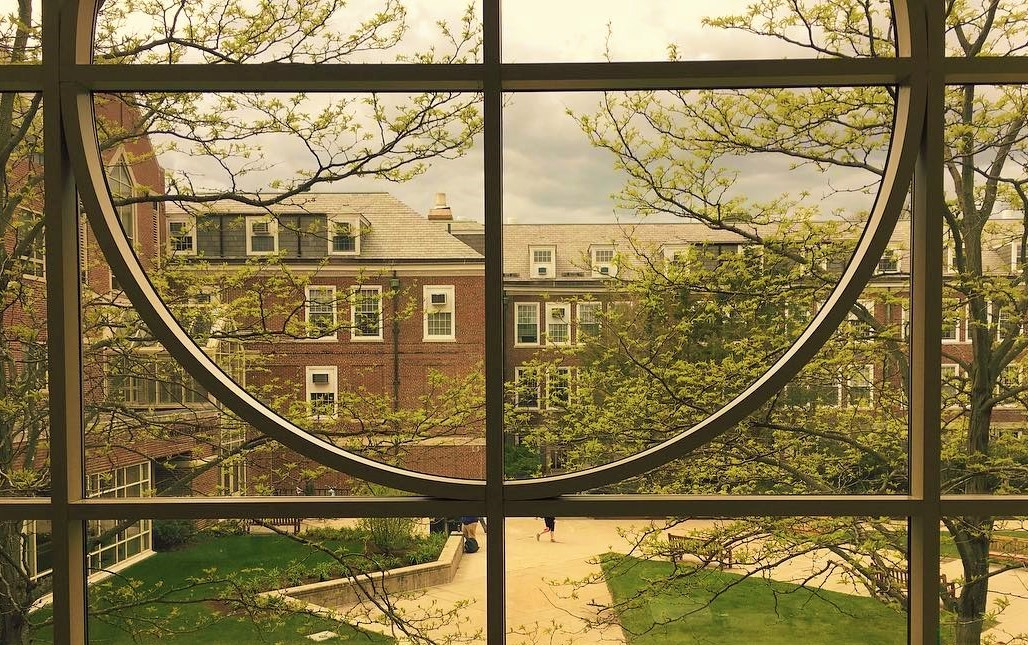
Mone Courtyard on the BC Law campus

BC Law offers a first-year law program that includes constitutional and criminal law, civil procedure, contracts, property, and torts, as well as a two-semester legal reasoning, research, and writing course called Law Practice, which provides three experiential learning credits and a foundation in critical thinking, analysis, and communication. There is also a 1L experiential-based elective in the spring semester. The School offers programs abroad through the Semester-in-Practice International Program primarily based in Dublin and exchange programs with Bucerius Law School, Paris HEAD Law School, and Renmin University in China. The law school also has exchange programs with Bucerius Law School, the Pontificia Universidad Católica Argentina, and numerous other law faculties throughout the world.

=== Law reviews ===
Boston College Law School has two main, student-run publications: Boston College Law Review (BCLR) and the Uniform Commercial Code Reporter-Digest (UCC Reporter-Digest). In Spring 2017, the Boston College Environmental Affairs Law Review, Boston College International and Comparative Law Review, and the Journal of Law and Social Justice published their last issues and consolidated into the Boston College Law Review.

The Boston College Law Review is the Law School's flagship journal and was ranked 16th in the 2023 Washington & Lee Law Review Rankings, the highest ranking in its history. It publishes 8 print issues and one electronic-only issue per year. It endeavors to publish high-quality pieces written by students and scholars on a wide variety of legal issues. In addition to articles written by outside academics, BCLR prints the work of its student staff, many of whom publish notes during their third year. BCLR’s second-year staff members also prepare short comments on significant court decisions, which may be published in the BCLR Electronic Supplement.

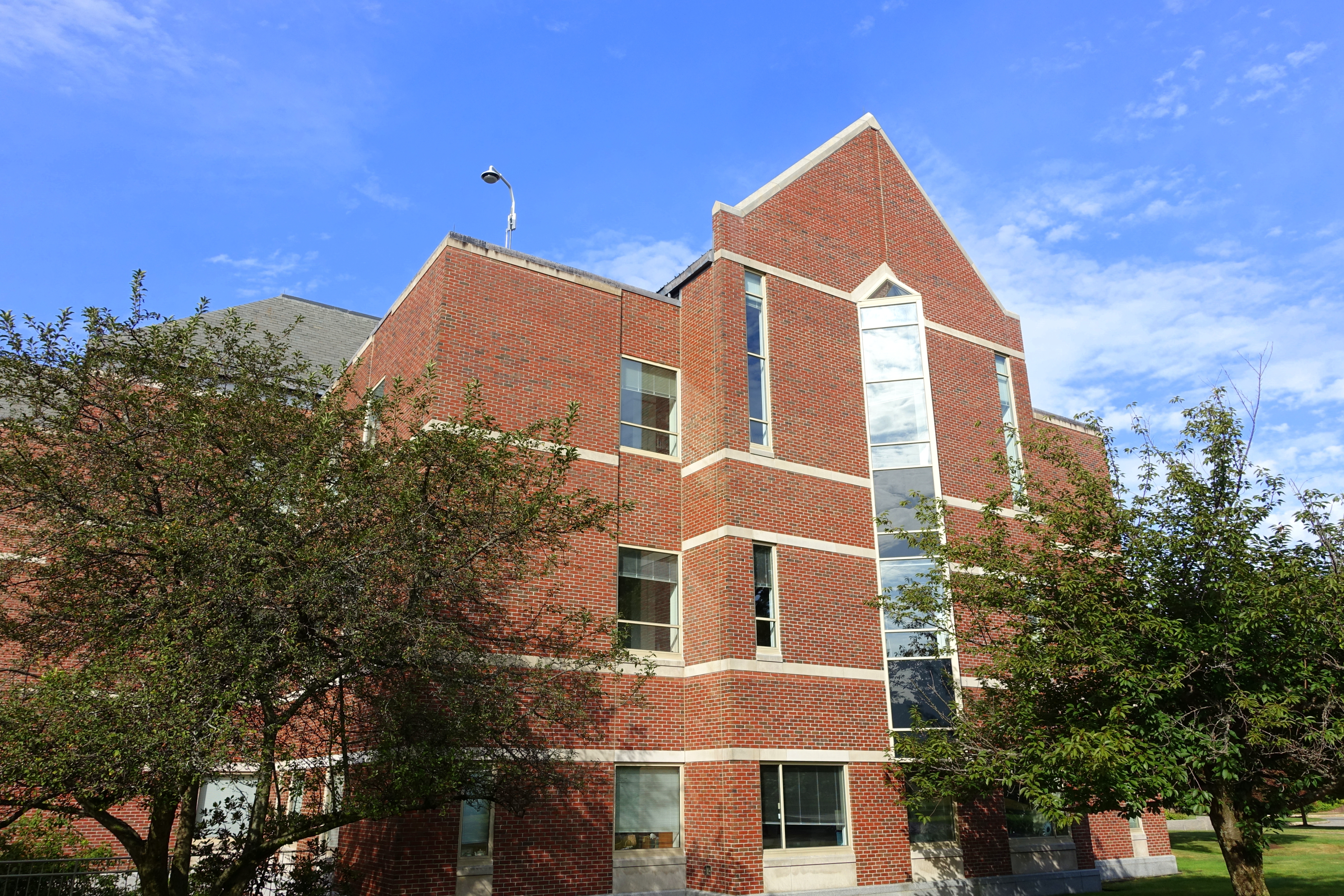
Boston College Law Library

The Uniform Commercial Code Reporter-Digest is published by Matthew Bender & Company, a division of LexisNexis. It provides annotations on numerous cases relating to the Uniform Commercial Code, thereby serving as a helpful research tool.

BC Law also maintains an online publication, the Intellectual Property and Technology Forum, covering issues of copyright, trademark and patent law.

=== Libraries ===
Opened in 1996 at a cost of $11.7 million, the 84,500-square-foot Law Library building was designed by the Boston firm of Earl R. Flansburgh & Associates and contains four levels organized in four wings around a unifying central atrium. It houses 500,000 print volumes covering all major areas of American law and primary legal materials from the federal government, Canada, United Kingdom, United Nations, and European Union. The library also features a substantial electronic volumes offering, treatise and periodical collection and a growing collection of international and comparative law material. The library's Coquillette Rare Book Room houses works from the fifteenth through nineteenth centuries, including works by and about Saint Thomas More. It also contains a marble fireplace mantel that once adorned the East Room of the White House.

== Rankings ==
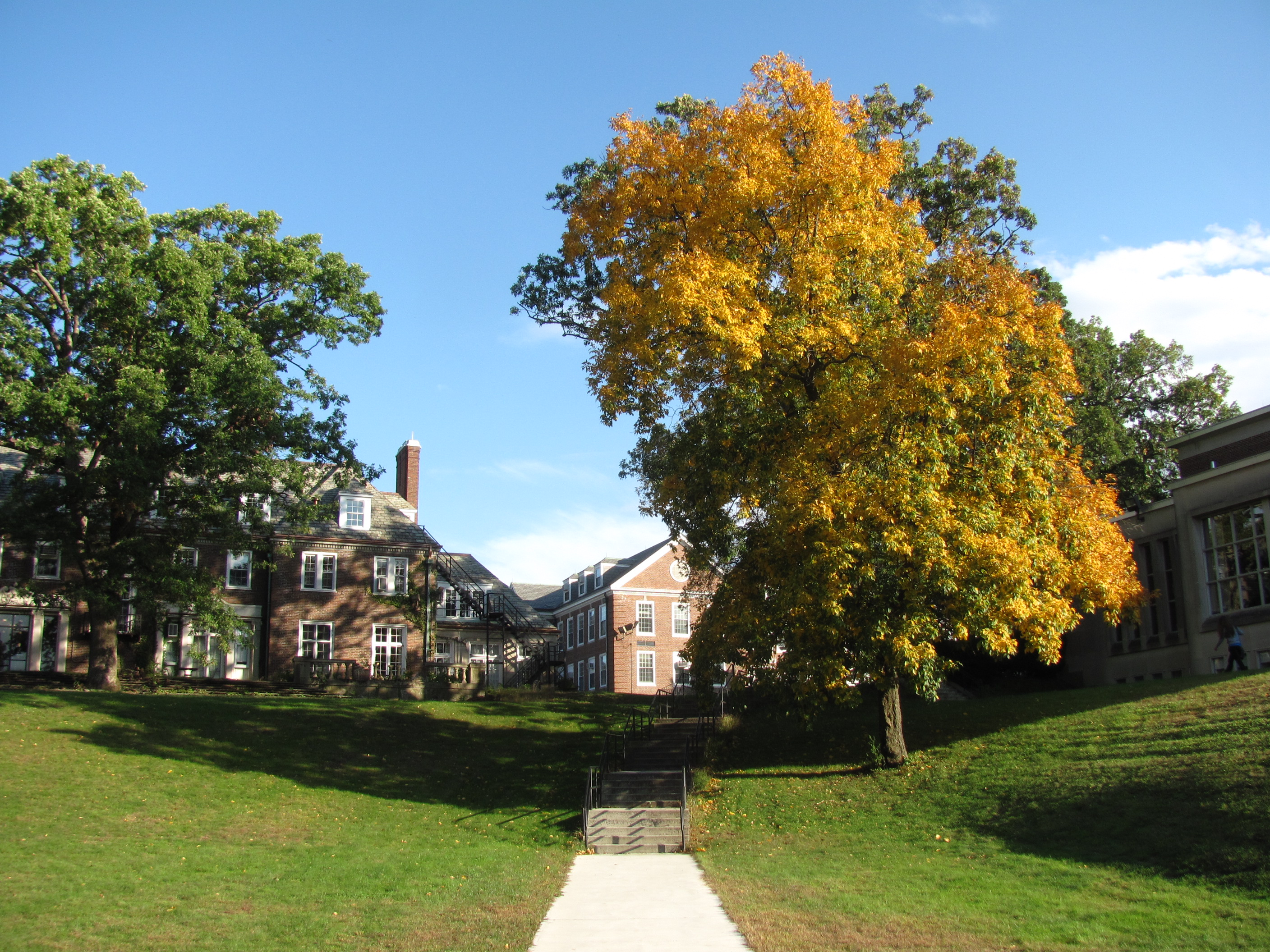
Boston College Law School campus

The Princeton Review rankings placed BC Law in the #8 position for "Best Professors". BC Law is also ranked #10 for "Best Quality of Life."

For 2024, Above The Law, a legal blog that focuses on outcomes-based methodology, ranked BC Law 16th overall in the country.

In 2024, the National Law Journal ranked the school #15 in its Top Law Schools for “Big Law” rankings.

The U.S. News & World Report’s 2026 law school rankings placed BC Law as the 20th best law school in the country. In 2026, the magazine ranked BC Law's tax program tied for 8th in the nation, its business/corporate law program tied for 25th, its constitutional law program tied for 26th, its intellectual property law program tied for 27th, its clinical training program tied for 29th, and its International law program tied for 31st. The 2026 report also ranked BC Law 16th in placing its graduates at Big Law firms.

== Bar passage ==
In 2022, the overall bar examination passage rate for BC Law first-time examination takers was 91.77%. The Ultimate Bar Pass Rate, which the ABA defines as the passage rate for graduates who sat for bar examinations within two years of graduating, was 97.10% for the class of 2020.

== Employment ==
According to BC Law's 2023 American Bar Association (ABA)-required disclosures, 86.82% of the Class of 2022 obtained full-time, long-term, JD-required employment (i.e., as attorneys) ten months after graduation. BC Law's Law School Transparency under-employment score is 6.98%, indicating the percentage of the Class of 2022 unemployed, pursuing an additional degree, or working in a non-professional, short-term, or part-time job nine months after graduation.

For BC Law graduates, median private sector starting salary is $145,000, and the median public service starting salary is $51,000, based on self-reporting data.

== Costs ==
The total cost of attendance (indicating the cost of tuition, fees, and living expenses) at BC Law for incoming students in the 2023–2024 academic year is $91,101. The Law School Transparency estimated debt-financed cost of attendance for three years is $353,770.

== Notable people ==
=== Faculty ===
- Arthur Berney (born 1930, deceased), was a Boston College Law School Professor Emeritus
- Daniel R. Coquillette, J. Donald Monan University Professor of Law and Dean Emeritus (1985-1993).
- Mary Sarah Bilder, Founders Professor of Law, legal historian. Bilder is the author of multiple books, with the most well known being Madison's Hand: Revising the Constitutional Convention. This book won the 2016 Bancroft Prize in American History and Diplomacy. She teaches broadly in the areas of property, trusts and estates, and American legal and constitutional history. Bilder has also been a frequent commentator on television and in news articles, and she served as Stephen Spielberg's legal history consultant on the 1997 historical film Amistad.
- Kent Greenfield, Professor of Law, Dean's Distinguished Scholar
- Aziz Rana, Professor of Law, author

== See also ==
- List of Boston College people
- Presidents of Boston College
