= Suzanne DiMaggio =

American foreign policy analyst

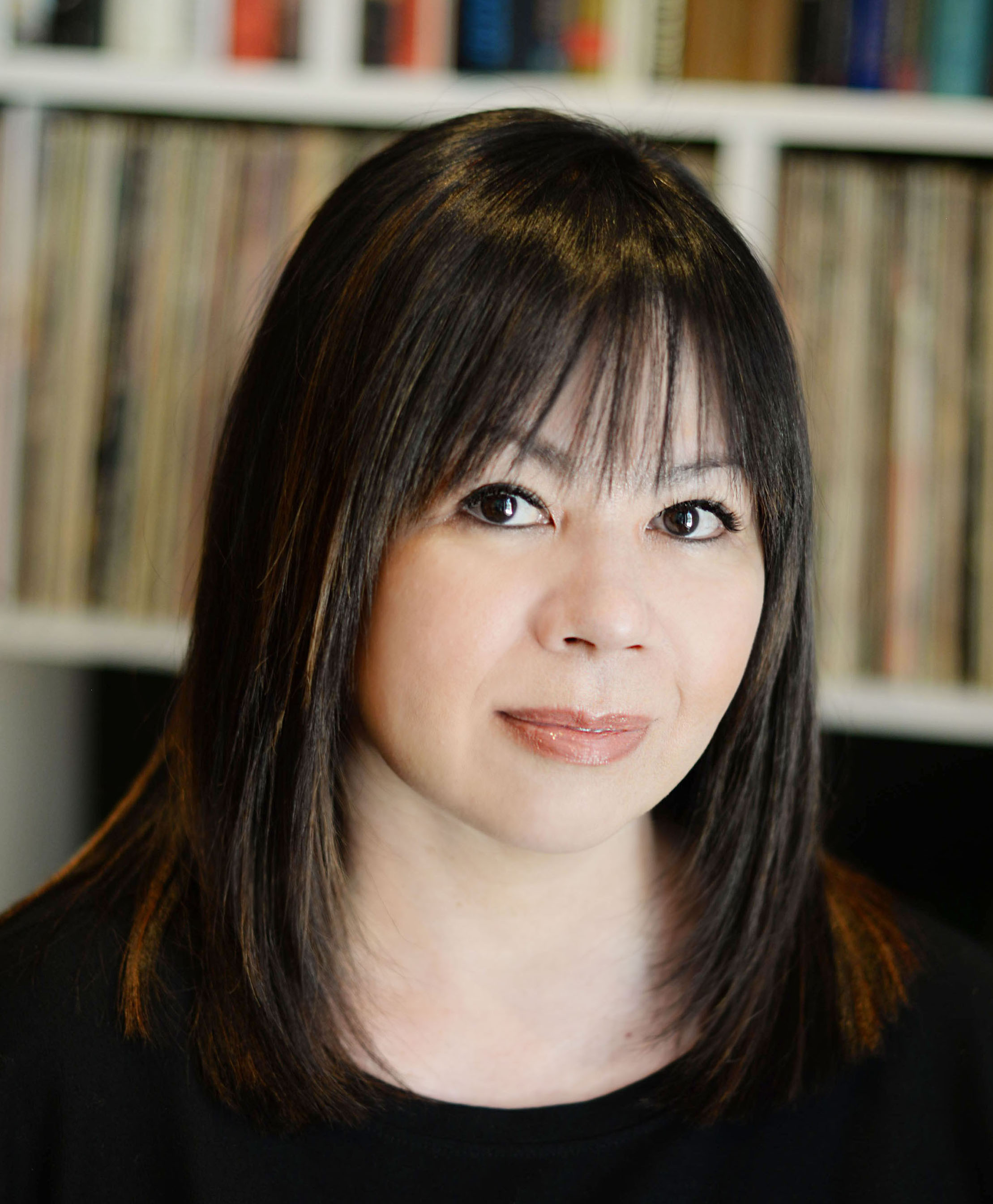
Suzanne DiMaggio in 2022

Suzanne DiMaggio is an American foreign policy analyst and a leading practitioner of Track II diplomacy, with a focus on countries that have limited or no official relations with the United States. She has led informal dialogues to help policymakers identify pathways for diplomatic progress on a range of issues, including regional security, nuclear nonproliferation, conflict prevention and resolution, crisis management, confidence building and negotiation, and bilateral relations. Her research and work draw on an approach to unofficial engagement she has been developing since the late 1990s, which began with a focus on U.S. relations with China, Russia, and Japan, and later expanded to Iran and the Middle East, Myanmar, and North Korea.

== Early life and education ==
DiMaggio's mother was Japanese and her father was Italian. She graduated from New York University with a B.A. in international business and then earned an M.A. in international relations from the City College of New York (CUNY).

== Career ==
DiMaggio is a Senior Fellow at the Carnegie Endowment for International Peace, where she focuses on U.S. foreign policy toward Asia and the Middle East. She directs Carnegie’s U.S.-Iran Initiative, which is carried out through a combination of policy dialogue and scholarly research with the aim of exploring possible grounds for constructive diplomatic engagement. The Initiative’s centerpiece is a long-running dialogue that she launched in 2002. These efforts helped to establish a foundational basis for the secret talks between Iran and the Obama administration that led to the 2015 landmark comprehensive nuclear agreement. They also contributed to a de-escalation in tensions following the killing by the U.S. of Iranian General Qasem Soleimani and Iranian retaliatory strikes on Al-Asad Airbase in Iraq in January 2020, and helped to avoid an escalatory spiral in the lead up to and during the April 2024 Israel-Iran conflict.

Her work on North Korea included an unofficial Track 1.5 dialogue process that transitioned to the first official diplomatic discussions between the Trump administration and the North Korean government in 2017. One report described DiMaggio as "a de facto ambassador for the United States" to North Korea.

In 2011, she facilitated early talks that brought together senior officials from Myanmar and the U.S. to exchange views on the re-establishment of relations following the transition of Myanmar’s government.

She is also an Associate Senior Fellow in the Disarmament, Arms Control and Non-proliferation Programme at the Stockholm International Peace Research Institute (SIPRI). DiMaggio also directs the Iran Project.

From 2014–2018, DiMaggio was a Senior Fellow at New America, where she directed several high-level policy dialogues, including with Iran, North Korea, and China. From 2007–2014, she was the Vice President of Global Policy Programs at the Asia Society. From 1998–2007, DiMaggio was the Vice President of Policy Programs at the United Nations Association of the United States. From 1993–1998, she was a Program Officer at the United Nations University, a research institute in Tokyo that links the UN system with international academic and policy communities.

From 2000-2007, she was an Adjunct Professor at the School of Diplomacy & International Relations at Seton Hall University, where she taught undergraduate and graduate courses on the United Nations, multilateral diplomacy, and sustainable development.

DiMaggio is a co-founder and the former chair of the Quincy Institute for Responsible Statecraft. The motivation behind establishing a new think tank, in her words, was "to push back on the mindset that leads to and facilitates endless war."

== Personal life ==
DiMaggio resides in New York City's Greenwich Village with her husband, Ben Allison, and daughter.

== Bibliography ==
- "Selecting the Next Secretary-General," Foreign Service Journal, September 2006, pages 40–46.
- "Obama's Iranian challenge," The Guardian, November 13, 2008.
- "U.S.-Iran Track II Diplomacy," The Iran Primer, October 11, 2010.
- "Advancing Myanmar’s Transition: A Way Forward for U.S. Foreign Policy," Asia Society, February 16, 2012.
- "Sustaining Myanmar’s Transition: Ten Critical Challenges," Asia Society, June 24, 2013.
- "Dealing with North Korea: Lessons from the Iran Nuclear Negotiations," Arms Control Today, Vol. 47, No. 6, (Jul/Aug 2017).
- Suzanne DiMaggio and Joel S. Wit, "How Trump Should Talk to North Korea," New York Times, November 7, 2017.
- DiMaggio, Suzanne; Sick, Gary (May 2, 2018). "If Trump shreds the Iran deal, it'll be a huge geopolitical mistake". New York Daily News.
- DiMaggio, Suzanne; Pickering, Thomas R. (February 5, 2019). "Correcting course on Iran: Trump has left us painfully isolated; it's time to reorient our foreign policy". New York Daily News.
- "One Year After the Singapore Summit: A Breakthrough in Search of a Strategy," 38 North, June 13, 2019.
- "A Principled U.S. Diplomatic Strategy toward North Korea," 38 North, February 22, 2021.
