= Gary Sick =

American academic and presidential advisor (born 1935)

Gary Gordon Sick (born April 4, 1935) is an American academic and analyst of Middle East affairs, with special expertise on Iran, who served on the U.S. National Security Council under Presidents Ford, Carter, and for a couple weeks under Reagan as well. He has authored three books, and is perhaps best known to the wider public for voicing support for elements of the 1980 October Surprise theory regarding the Iran hostage crisis and that year's presidential election. He also alleged that Iraq may have had a role in the September 11 attacks.

== Biographical profile ==
Sick is a retired captain in the U.S. Navy. He received a BA from University of Kansas in 1957, a Master of Science degree at George Washington University in 1970, followed by a PhD in political science at Columbia University in 1973.

Sick served on the staff of the National Security Council under President Carter, and was the principal White House aide for Persian Gulf affairs from 1976 to 1981, a period which included the Iranian Revolution and the hostage crisis.

After leaving government service, Sick served as Deputy Director for International Affairs at the Ford Foundation from 1982 to 1987, and is the executive director of the Gulf/2000 Project at Columbia University (1993–present), which has published five books and numbers many of the leading scholars on the Persian Gulf among its global membership. He is an adjunct professor of International Affairs and a senior research scholar at Columbia's School of International & Public Affairs, where he has been voted one of the top professors. He is emeritus member of the board of directors of Human Rights Watch, and serves as founding chair of the Advisory Committee of Human Rights Watch/Middle East.

== October Surprise allegations ==
External videos
- Booknotes interview with Gary Sick on October Surprise, December 1, 1991, C-SPAN

On April 15, 1991, The New York Times published an opinion piece by Sick that stated "individuals associated with the Reagan-Bush campaign of 1980 met secretly with Iranian officials to delay the release of the American hostages until after the Presidential election. For this favor, Iran was rewarded with a substantial supply of arms from Israel." While the "October Surprise" allegations had been promoted by others as early as 1980, the Times article immediately elevated the story to national prominence. Sick later detailed the allegations in his book October Surprise: America's Hostages in Iran and the Election of Ronald Reagan. Sick's allegations were addressed by both houses of Congress, which concluded that there was no evidence for his claims.

== Writings ==
=== Books ===
- All Fall Down: America's Tragic Encounter with Iran (Random House, 1985)
- October Surprise: America's Hostages in Iran and the Election of Ronald Reagan (Random House/Times Books, 1991)
- The Persian Gulf at the Millennium: Essays in Politics, Economy, Security, and Religion (St. Martin's Press, 1997)

=== Articles ===
- DiMaggio, Suzanne; Sick, Gary (May 2, 2018). "If Trump shreds the Iran deal, it'll be a huge geopolitical mistake". New York Daily News.

== See also ==
- Jimmy Carter's engagement with Ruhollah Khomeini
