= Michael D. Swaine =

American political scientist (born 1951)

- Other name: 史文
- Education: GWU (BA), Harvard (MA, PhD)
- Occupation: East Asia Analyst
- Employer: Quincy Institute for Responsible Statecraft

Michael Dalzell Swaine (born March 11, 1951) is an American political scientist. He is a senior research fellow in the East Asia Program at the Quincy Institute for Responsible Statecraft.

Prior to joining the Quincy Institute, Swaine was a Senior Associate in the Asia Program at the Carnegie Endowment for International Peace.

Before joining the Carnegie Endowment as co-director of the China Program in 2001, Swaine worked for 12 years at the RAND Corporation, where he was appointed as the first recipient of the RAND Center for Asia-Pacific Policy Chair in Northeast Asian Security.

== Education ==
Swaine holds a BA from George Washington University and a MA and PhD in government from Harvard. He studied Mandarin and Japanese at Stanford University's Inter-University Center for Chinese Language Studies in Taipei and Inter-University Center for Japanese Language Studies in Tokyo.

== Career ==
Swaine is a regular contributor to the China Leadership Monitor, a journal published by the Hoover Institution at Stanford University. He has published several books, monographs, and articles related to U.S.-China relations, East Asian international relations, the Chinese military, Taiwan, Japan, and Chinese foreign policy and grand strategy. An article in a Chinese foreign affairs journal identified Swaine as one of the four major scholars in the third generation of American "China watchers," along with David M. Lampton, Harry Harding, and Jonathan D. Pollack.

Swaine has conducted several joint research studies with institutions and scholars based in China, Taiwan, and Japan. He coordinates the U.S.-China Crisis Management Program (sponsored in part by the China Foundation for International and Strategic Studies (Chinese: 中国国际战略研究基金会; pinyin: Zhōngguó Guójì Zhànlüè Yánjiū Jījīn Huì) which brings together scholars and practitioners from both countries to analyze past crises and discuss how to manage future crises in the relationship. Swaine's 2006 book Managing Sino-American Crises: Case Studies and Analysis (with Zhang Tuosheng and Danielle F. S. Cohen) compiles several of the papers and analyses that arose from a 2004 conference in Beijing. A book review by Steven Goldstein published in The China Quarterly called this program "clearly one of the more ambitious joint Sino-American social science projects that has been undertaken since scholarly contacts were restored in the 1980s."

Swaine coordinated an annual Conference on People's Liberation Army Affairs which was co-sponsored by the Taipei-based Center for Advanced Policy Studies (Chinese: 中華民國高等政策研究協會; pinyin: Zhōnghuá Mínguó Gāoděng Zhèngcè Yánjiū Xiéhuì), the Carnegie Endowment for International Peace, the RAND Corporation, and the National Defense University. The 22nd annual Conference on PLA Affairs was held in Taipei, Taiwan, from October 27 to November 1, 2010, with a keynote address by Ma Ying-jeou, president of Taiwan.

Before starting at RAND in 1989, Swaine worked at a private sector firm and studied as a postdoctoral fellow at UC Berkeley's Center for Chinese Studies and as a research associate at Harvard.

== Publications ==
- America’s Challenge: Engaging a Rising China in the Twenty-First Century (Carnegie, June 2011)
- Is a Regional Strategy Viable in Afghanistan?, with Tiffany Ng, et al., Carnegie Report (May 2010)
- "Sino-American Crisis Management and the U.S.-Japan Alliance" in The Japan-U.S. Alliance and China-Taiwan Relations: Implications for Okinawa, Mike M. Mochizuki, ed. (2008)
- "Managing Relations with the United States," in Presidential Politics in Taiwan, Steven M. Goldstein and Julian Chang, eds. (Eastbridge, 2008)
- Assessing the Threat: The Chinese Military and Taiwan's Security, with Andrew Yang, Evan Medeiros, and Oriana Skylar Mastro (Carnegie 2007)
- Managing Sino-American Crises: Case Studies and Analysis, with Zhang Tuosheng and Danielle F. S. Cohen (Carnegie 2006)
- "Military Modernization in Taiwan," in Strategic Asia 2005-2006, Ashley J. Tellis and Michael Wills, eds. (Seattle: National Bureau of Asian Research, 2005)
- "Simmering Fire in Asia: Averting Sino-Japanese Strategic Conflict," with Minxin Pei, Policy Brief No. 44 (Carnegie, November 2005)
- "U.S.-China Relations and the Implications for Okinawa" in The Okinawa Question and the U.S.-Japan Alliance, Akikazu Hashimoto, Mike M. Mochizuki, and Kurayoshi Takara, eds. (Sigur Center for Asian Studies, 2005)
- "Deterring Conflict in the Taiwan Strait," Carnegie Paper No. 46 (July 2004)
- "The Taiwan Relations Act: The Next 25 Years," Testimony to the U.S. House of Representatives Committee on International Relations, April 2004
- "Trouble in Taiwan," Foreign Affairs, Vol. 83, No. 2, March/April 2004
- "Reverse Course? The Fragile Turnaround in U.S.-China Relations," Policy Brief No. 22 (Carnegie, February 2003)
- "Rebalancing United States-China Relations," with Minxin Pei, Policy Brief (Carnegie, February 2002)
- "Chinese Decision-Making Regarding Taiwan, 1979-2000" in The Making of Chinese Foreign and Security Policy in the Era of Reform, David M. Lampton, ed. (Stanford University Press, 2001)
- "Ballistic Missiles and Missile Defense in Asia," in Strategic Asia 2001-2002, Richard J. Ellings and Aaron L. Friedberg, eds. (Seattle: National Bureau of Asian Research, 2001)
- Japan and Ballistic Missile Defense, with Rachel M. Swanger and Takashi Kawakami (RAND 2001)
- Taiwan's Foreign and Defense Policies: Features and Determinants (RAND 2001)
- Interpreting China's Grand Strategy: Past, Present, and Future, with Ashley J. Tellis (RAND 2000)
- Taiwan's National Security, Defense Policy, and Weapons Procurement Processes (RAND 1999)
- The Role of the Chinese Military in National Security Policymaking, rev. ed. (RAND 1998))
- "The PLA and Chinese National Security Policy: Leaderships, Structures, Processes," The China Quarterly, No. 146, Jun., 1996
- China: Domestic Change and Foreign Policy (RAND 1995)
- "The Military and Political Succession in China: Leadership, Institutions, Beliefs," The China Quarterly, No. 136, Dec., 1993
