= Quincy Institute for Responsible Statecraft =

American think tank (est. 2019)

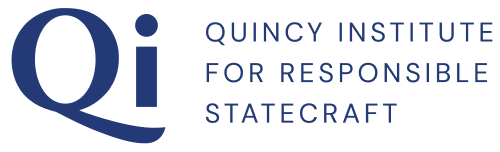
- Formation: 2019; 7 years ago
- Type: 501(c)(3) organization
- Tax ID no.: 84-2285143
- Board Chair: Stephen B. Heintz
- Website: responsiblestatecraft.org

The Quincy Institute for Responsible Statecraft is an American foreign policy think tank which has been described as advocating realism and restraint in foreign policy.

Founded in 2019 and headquartered in Washington, D.C., it is named after the sixth president of the United States (1825–29), John Quincy Adams.

The Institute's CEO is Lora Lumpe. Its executive vice president is Trita Parsi.

== History ==
The Quincy Institute was co-founded by Trita Parsi, Stephen Wertheim, Eli Clifton, Suzanne DiMaggio, and Andrew Bacevich, a former U.S. Army officer who fought in the Vietnam War and later became a professor of history at Boston University. Bacevich is the Quincy Institute's emeritus board chair; as of 2024 its chair is Stephen B. Heintz.

The think tank is named after U.S. President John Quincy Adams who, as secretary of state, said in a speech on July 4, 1821, that the United States "goes not abroad in search of monsters to destroy." It has been described as "realist" and "promot[ing] an approach to the world based on diplomacy and restraint rather than threats, sanctions, and bombing." The Nation magazine noted that "Quincy's founding members say again and again that 9/11 and the Iraq War were turning points in their careers."

Initial funding for the group, launched in November 2019, included half a million dollars each from George Soros' Open Society Foundations and Charles Koch's Koch Foundation. Substantial funding has also come from the Ford Foundation, the Carnegie Corporation of New York, the Rockefeller Brothers Fund, and Schumann Center for Media and Democracy. The institute distinguishes itself from many other think tanks in Washington, D.C. by refusing to accept money from foreign governments.

In 2022, during the Russian invasion of Ukraine, there were two resignations in protest at the institute's dovish response to the conflict: non-resident fellow Joseph Cirincione of Ploughshares Fund, who had raised money for Quincy, and board member Paul Eaton, a retired U.S. Army major general and adviser to Democratic politicians and liberal advocacy groups. Cirincione said he "fundamentally" disagrees with Quincy experts who "completely ignore the dangers and the horrors of Russia's invasion and occupation and focus almost exclusively on criticism of the United States, NATO, and Ukraine". Eaton said he resigned because he "supports NATO". Parsi responded by saying that Cirincione's criticisms "were not only false but bewildering," and were easily disproved by "a quick glance at our website."

In 2024, the Quincy Institute was one of several organizations that opposed the reauthorization of the United States House Select Committee on Strategic Competition between the United States and the Chinese Communist Party.

== Purpose ==
The Quincy Institute states that it is a nonprofit research organization and think tank that hosts scholars, participates in debates, publishes analysis pieces by journalists and academics, and advocates for a "less militarized and more cooperative foreign policy". According to its statement of purpose, it is opposed to the military-industrial complex described by President Dwight D. Eisenhower in his farewell address.

Co-founder Trita Parsi has described the Quincy Institute as "transpartisan", and, according to The Nation, has described the need for "an alliance of politicians on the left and right who agree on the need for restraint, even if they do so for different reasons". According to Bacevich, the purpose of the institute is to "promote restraint as a central principle of US foreign policy — fewer wars and more effective diplomatic engagement."

== Reception ==
According to The Nation, the Quincy Institute founders believe that the existing foreign policy elite is out of step with the American public, which is "far more skeptical of military adventurism". Mother Jones said that the Quincy Institute offers "a rare voice of dissent from foreign policy orthodoxy."

Daniel W. Drezner, writing in The Washington Post, described the institute as a "think tank that advocates a sober version of restraint", and said that it joined the Cato Institute, the Center for the National Interest, and New America "in the heterodox foreign policy basket".

Hal Brands, writing in Bloomberg News, described it as a "well-funded think tank" that is part of the "restraint coalition", a "loose network of analysts, advocates and politicians calling for a sharply reduced US role in the world".

Some writers have argued that the agenda of the institute is in line with the Trump administration's foreign policy on some issues, such as negotiating with North Korea, but has a different approach from the Trump administration on others, such as US involvement in the war in Yemen.

Writing in Survival, the journal of the International Institute for Strategic Studies, Daniel Deudney and John Ikenberry criticized the "restraints" that the Quincy Institute advocates for as "misplaced and inadequate". Deudney and Ikenberry argue that liberal internationalism would offer a more historically effective basis for institution-based restraint, than transactional agreements between states supported by the geopolitical restraint school.

In January 2020, Republican US senator Tom Cotton accused the institute of antisemitism, calling it an "isolationist, blame America First money pit for so-called scholars who've written that American foreign policy could be fixed if only it were rid of the malign influence of Jewish money." Quincy president Andrew Bacevich described Cotton's claim as absurd. The Jerusalem Post has also described many of its fellows as controversial: Lawrence Wilkerson for his views on what he called the "Jewish lobby" and Chas Freeman for what The Jerusalem Post describes as "controversial" statements about the Israel lobby and calling American Jews a "fifth column" for Israel.

According to an April 2021 article in the conservative Jewish online magazine Tablet, two Quincy Institute's non-resident fellows rejected the argument that the persecution of Uyghurs in China amounts to a genocide.

== Personnel ==
The Quincy Institute's co-founders include:

- Andrew Bacevich, president
- Eli Clifton, senior advisor
- Suzanne DiMaggio, chairman
- Trita Parsi, executive vice president
- Stephen Wertheim

Notable affiliated scholars include:

- Neta Crawford
- Mary L. Dudziak
- Roxane Farmanfarmaian
- Nils Gilman
- Greg Grandin
- William D. Hartung
- Ann Jones
- Joshua Landis
- William M. LeoGrande
- Anatol Lieven
- Jim Lobe
- William Luers
- John Mearsheimer
- Jeanne Morefield
- Samuel Moyn
- Paul R. Pillar
- Aziz Rana
- Miguel Tinker Salas
- Annelle Sheline
- Steven Simon
- Michael D. Swaine
- Monica Toft
- Katrina vanden Heuvel
- Stephen Walt

=== Media appearances ===
Many of the scholars affiliated with the institute have made multiple appearances on Background Briefing, a daily public affairs program hosted by journalist Ian Masters which is largely focused on U.S. foreign policy and national security.

== See also ==
- Defense Priorities
