= Politics of Iran =

Legislative branch
- Name: Islamic Consultative Assembly
- Type: Unicameral
- Meeting place: Baharestan, Tehran
- Presiding officer: Mohammad Bagher Ghalibaf, Speaker

Executive branch
- Head of government
- Title: President
- Currently: Masoud Pezeshkian
- Appointer: Direct popular vote
- Head of state and government
- Title: Supreme Leader
- Currently: Mojtaba Khamenei
- Appointer: Assembly of Experts
- Cabinet
- Name: Cabinet of Iran
- Current cabinet: Cabinet of Masoud Pezeshkian
- Leader: President
- Deputy leader: Vice President
- Appointer: President
- Headquarters: Presidential Administration of Iran, Sa'dabad Complex
- Ministries: 19

Judicial branch
- Name: Judicial system of the Islamic Republic of Iran
- Courts: Courts of Iran
- Supreme Court
- Chief judge: Gholam-Hossein Mohseni-Eje'i
- Seat: Courthouse of Tehran

The politics of Iran takes place in the framework of a unitary Islamic theocracy which was formed following the overthrow of Iran's millennia-long monarchy by the 1979 Revolution. Iran's system of government (nezam) was described by Juan José Linz in 2000 as combining "the ideological bent of totalitarianism with the limited pluralism of authoritarianism", although it "holds regular elections in which candidates who advocate different policies and incumbents are frequently defeated". Iran was evaluated as an electoral autocracy for year 2024 by V-Dem Institute according to Regimes of the World classification.

The December 1979 constitution of the Islamic Republic of Iran, declares that Shia Islam is Iran's state religion (around 90–95% of Iranians associate themselves with the Shia branch of Islam), and it combines elements of theocracy (Guardianship of the Islamic Jurist) with a presidential system in a religious democracy. Iran directly elects the president, parliament (Majles) and the Assembly of Experts. All candidates who run for these positions must be vetted by the Guardian Council (which disqualifies the overwhelming majority of the candidates) for their loyalty to the Islamic Republic's system of government. Indirectly elected are the government of the Islamic Republic of Iran, the Supreme Leader of Iran, and the Guardian Council, half of which is made up of Islamic jurists. In addition, there are representatives from appointed organizations, usually under the Supreme Leader's control, to "protect the state's Islamic character". The Supreme Leader is the head of state, above the president.

== History and background ==
=== 1979 Revolution ===
In 1979, Shah Mohammad Reza Pahlavi was overthrown by an Islamic Revolution in Iran, replacing its millennia-old monarchy with a theocratic republic. Shortly after, the leader of the Revolution, a senior Islamic jurist named Ayatollah Ruhollah Khomeini (also transliterated as Khumaynî) successfully supported referendums to declare Iran an Islamic Republic in March 1979, and to approve a constitution in December 1979, whereby "the Islamic government" would be "based upon wilayat al-faqih", (Guardianship of the Islamic Jurist) "as proposed by Imam Khumaynî", quoting the preamble of the constitution.

The constitution (which was drafted by an assembly made up primarily by disciples of Khomeini), calls for a Vali-ye faqih (Guardian Islamic Jurist), to serve as the Supreme Leader of Iran, and for Islamic jurists to serve in other powerful institutions such as the Guardian Council and Assembly of Experts.

=== Establishment of guardianship of the jurist ===
Guardianship of the Jurist is a concept in Twelver Shia Islamic law, which holds that, in the absence of the "Infallible Imam", who, according to Twelver beliefs, is the religious and political leader of Islam and will reappear sometime before Judgement Day, righteous Shi'i jurists (faqīh) should administer "some" of the "religious and social affairs" of the Shi'i community. In its "absolute" form—the form advanced by the Ayatollah Ruhollah Khomeini and the basis of government in Islamic Republic of Iran—the state and society are ruled by an Islamic jurist. Khomeini served as the Guardian Jurist Supreme Leader of Iran until his death in 1989. His successor, Ali Khamenei, ruled from 1989 until his assassination in 2026. He is succeeded by his son, Mojtaba Khamenei.

In a 1970 book on the subject circulated to his network of supporters, Khomeini argued that since Islamic sharia law contains everything needed to rule a state, whether ancient or modern, any other basis of governance will lead to injustice and sin. Thus Iran, the Muslim world and eventually the whole world, must be ruled according to sharia, and the person who should rule according to sharia, is an expert in that form of law.

These Guardians are deemed the true holders of both religious and political authority, who must be obeyed as "an expression of obedience to God", and whose rule has "precedence over all secondary ordinances in Islam such as prayer, fasting, and pilgrimage."

=== Post-revolutionary political conditions ===
The early days of the revolutionary government were characterized by political tumult. In November 1979, the US embassy was seized and its occupants taken hostage and kept captive for 444 days, because of US support for the Shah (monarch) of Iran. The eight-year Iran–Iraq War killed hundreds of thousands and cost the country billions of dollars. By the early 1980s, power struggles ended in leftists and nationalists eliminated from all governmental institutions, and the revolutionary leader Ayatollah Khomeini and his supporters firmly in control.

Iran's post-revolution challenges have included the imposition of economic sanctions and the suspension of diplomatic relations with Iran by the United States because of the hostage crisis, political support to Iraq and other acts of terrorism that the U.S. government and some others have accused Iran of sponsoring. Emigration from Iran has cost Iran millions of educated people, including entrepreneurs, professionals, technicians, and skilled craftspeople and their capital. Poverty rose by nearly 45% in absolute terms during the first 6 years of the Iran-Iraq War, and according to the World Bank, by the time the war ended in 1988, per capita income was a little more than half of what it had been in 1976, shortly before the revolution. During the 2026 Iran war and following the elimination Iran's leadership, the IRGC rose as the main power in the country. Based on reports Iran has transformed its leadership to a military junta.

==== Human rights ====
===== Background =====
The alleged tyranny and brutality towards all opposition of the monarchy was one of the propaganda themes of the Islamic revolution, but the Islamic Republic has not tolerated opposition to its system of government, since, as mentioned above, it believes disobedience to it is disobedience to God. In 1984, Iran's representative to the United Nations, Saʿid Rajaʾie-Khorassani, declared the Universal Declaration of Human Rights to be representing a "secular understanding of the Judeo-Christian tradition", which did not "accord with the system of values recognized by the Islamic Republic of Iran" and whose provisions the IRI would "not hesitate to violate".

In reply to international criticism of repression, Iranian officials loyal to the Supreme Leader deny wrongdoing, maintaining its human rights record is better than western countries who criticize its record. In 2004, Judiciary chief Ayatollah Mahmoud Hashemi Shahroudi, denied that there were any political prisoners in Iran, saying "The world may consider certain cases, by their nature, political crimes, but because we do not have a law in this regard, these are considered ordinary offenses." In 2008, President Mahmoud Ahmadinejad replied to a question about human rights by stating that Iran has fewer prisoners than the US and "the human rights situation in Iran is relatively a good one, when compared ... with some European countries and the United States."

Whether the Islamic Republic goes well beyond what Sunni and many Shia Muslims consider Islamic exceptions to international human rights norms, is also an issue. Khomeini's January 1988 pronouncement "... that [Islamic] government is a branch of the Prophet's absolute Wilayat and one of the primary (first order) rules of Islam that has priority over all ordinances of the law even praying, fasting and Hajj…The Islamic State could prevent implementation of everything – devotional and non- devotional – that so long as it seems against Islam's interests", leads Ann Elizabeth Mayer to argue that this theory of velayat-e motlaqaye faqih ("the absolute authority of the jurist") "freed" the Islamic Republic "to do as it chose-even if this meant violating fundamental pillars of the religion ...", and that this doctrine, not sharia law, explained "the prevalence of torture and punishment of political dissent" in the Islamic Republic.

On the other hand, despite the vast popularity of Khomeini in Iran before and after the revolution, (approximately 10 million people are estimated to have participated in his funeral in a country of about 60 million), observers (Akbar Ganji, Arzoo Osanloo, Hooman Majd) have suggested there is no widespread support for violent crackdowns on dissent in contemporary Iran. "Notions of democracy and human rights" now have much deeper roots among Iranians than under the Shah, and in fact are "almost hegemonic" (Arzoo Osanloo), so that it is much harder to spread fear among them, even to the point that if Iranian intelligence services "were to arrest anyone who speaks ill of the government in private, they simply couldn't build cells fast enough to hold their prisoners", according to journalist Hooman Majd.

===== Situation =====
The Islamic Republic centralized and drastically expanded the prison system of the previous regime. In one early period (1981–1985) more than 7,900 people were executed. Somewhere between 3,000 and 30,000 political prisoners were executed between July and early September 1988 on orders of the Ayatollah Khomeini, causing a 2020 UN Special Rapporteurs to send a letter to the regime describing the killings as "crimes against humanity".

The Islamic Republic has been criticized both for restrictions and punishments that follow the Islamic Republic's constitution and law, but not international human rights norms (harsh penalties for crimes, punishment of victimless crimes, restrictions on freedom of speech and the press, restrictions on freedom of religion, etc.); and for "extrajudicial" actions that follow neither, such as firebombings of newspaper offices, and beatings, torture, rape, and killing without trial of political prisoners and dissidents/civilians.

==== Protests ====
While the Islamic Republic has been noted for its political stability, political protests against perceived corruption and injustice have become more severe and common in the twenty-first century. Nevertheless, at least one analyst, Seth G. Jones, believes that as of 2019, "the Iranian protest movement is ... too decentralized and Iranian security forces ... too strong" for the regime to be in danger of being overthrown by protesters. Some protests include:

- Iran student protests, July 1999: Protested the closure of the reformist newspaper (Salam), and violent attack on a student dormitory by riot police. Disappearance of more than seventy students, 1,200–1,400 arrested.
- 2009 Iranian presidential election protests: Protest against alleged voting fraud and irregularities during the 2009 election. An estimated 36 killed according to Iranian government, 72 killed according to opposition.
- 2011–12 Iranian protests: Protest against alleged electoral fraud during 2009 elections, violation of human rights, lack of freedom of speech, corruption.
- 2017–18 Iranian protests: Protest against economic hardships, government corruption, Iranian involvement in regional conflicts, the autocratic government of Ali Khamenei, human rights violations; 23-25 killed, 4,972 people arrested.
- 2018–2019 Iranian general strikes and protests: Protests against economic hardships, government corruption, Iranian involvement in regional conflicts. 300+ arrested.
- 2019–20 Iranian protests: Protest against government corruption, fuel price increases, human rights abuses, in favor of regime change. an estimated 1,500 killed, 7,000+ arrested.
- 2021–2022 Iranian protests: Protested the ongoing water shortages and blackouts of electricity all over Iran. An estimated 11 people killed, over 100 arrested.
- 2025–2026 Iranian protests: Beginning on 28 December 2025, the events have been described as the largest uprising since the 1979 Islamic Revolution. The ensuing crackdown resulted in the 2026 Iran massacres.

== Leading figures and institutions ==
=== Current office holders ===
Main office holders
Office	Name	Picture	Since
Supreme Leader	Mojtaba Khamenei		8 March 2026
President	Masoud Pezeshkian		28 July 2024; 2 years ago
Speaker of Parliament	Mohammad Bagher Ghalibaf		28 May 2020; 6 years ago
Chief Justice	Gholam-Hossein Mohseni-Eje'i		1 July 2021; 5 years ago

Two powerful, unelected features of the Islamic Republic's political system are the office of the Supreme Leader and the Guardian Council.

=== Supreme Leader ===
The Supreme Leader of Iran is the head of state and highest ranking political and religious authority (above the President). The armed forces, judicial system, state television, and other key governmental organizations such as the Guardian Council and Expediency Discernment Council are under the control of the Supreme Leader. According to article 110 of the constitution, the Supreme Leader delineates the general policies of the Islamic Republic. There have been three Supreme Leaders since the founding of the Islamic Republic, and the current leader (Mojtaba Khamenei), has been in power since 2026, following the assassination of previous Supreme Leader and his father Ali Khamenei. His powers extend to issuing decrees and making final decisions on the economy, environment, foreign policy, education, national planning of population growth,

the amount of transparency in elections in Iran, and who is to be fired and reinstated in the Presidential cabinet.

Supreme Leader Ali Khamenei at the head of Iran, an Iranian poster

The Supreme Leader is appointed by the Assembly of Experts. All candidates to the Assembly of Experts, the President and the Majlis (Parliament), are selected by the Guardian Council, half of whose members are selected by the Supreme Leader of Iran. All directly elected members after the vetting process by the Guardian Council still have to be approved by the Supreme Leader.

=== Guardian Council ===
The Guardian Council is an appointed and constitutionally mandated 12-member council with considerable power. It approves or vetoes legislative bills from the Islamic Consultative Assembly (the Iranian Parliament), supervises elections, and approves or forbids candidates seeking office to the Assembly of Experts, the Presidency and the parliament. Six of its twelve members are Islamic faqihs (expert in Islamic Law) selected by the Supreme Leader of Iran. The other six are jurists nominated by the Head of the Judicial system (who is also appointed by the Supreme Leader), and approved by the Iranian Parliament.

== Political parties, factions and elections ==
=== Political parties, organizations, pressure groups ===
After the revolution, the Islamic Republic Party was Iran's ruling and only legal political party until its dissolution in 1987. Its abolition has been attributed to Ayatollah Khomeini's well founded belief that leftist, monarchists and nationalists had been suppressed, and his network's place in power was secure. Supporters of the Islamic Republic Party reorganised themselves as "principalists", and along with the "reformists", became two of the major political factions in the country.

The Executives of Construction Party was formed in 1994 to run for the fifth parliamentary elections, made up mainly of executives in the government close to the then-president Akbar Hashemi-Rafsanjani. There are several other legal political parties or associations operating in Iran. Legal political groups, must support the Ayatollah Khomeini, his Islamic Revolution, and the Islamist political system (nezam) created by the revolution, the exclusion of “nonrevolutionary” and secular parties from political participation, and agree Iran's fundamental security interest is the survival and strengthening of the nezam.

Active student groups include the pro-reform "Office for Strengthening Unity" and "the Union of Islamic Student Societies". Groups that generally support the Islamic Republic include Ansar-e Hizballah, The Iranian Islamic Students Association, Muslim Students Following the Line of the Imam, Islam's Students, and the Islamic Coalition Association. The conservative power base has been said to be made up of a "web of Basiji militia members, families of war martyrs, some members of the Revolutionary Guard, some government employees, some members of the urban and rural poor, and conservative-linked foundations."

Anti-government groups

There are many nationalist, leftist and monarchist dissident parties and militias including National Front, the Constitutionalist Party, the Tudeh Party, People's Mujahedin Organization of Iran (MEK), Iranian People's Fedai Guerrillas (IPFG), Democratic Party of Iranian Kurdistan, and the Qashqai Freedom Path Party(QAYI).

=== Political factions ===
Iran's political parties/organizations are said to represent political factions in Iran, and according to at least one source, "factionalism has generally been more important than constitutional process in decision making", especially under Supreme Leader Ali Khamenei, i.e. after 1990, when "factional competition" grew "markedly in both intensity and influence".

Scholars such as Maziar Behrooz, Behzad Nabavi, Bahman Baktiari, Maaike Warnaar, Payam Mohseni, have given different formulations of them, varying in number, usually between three and five, the basic three being Principlists, (also known as the hard line faction) Pragmatists and Reformists, and orientation (ideological purity vs. pragmatism; support for political and religious freedom vs. authoritarianism; support for regulation and intervention in the marketplace vs. laissez faire policies).

=== Elections ===
These are the most recent elections that have taken place:

=== Complexity of the system ===
A network of elected, indirectly elected, and appointed institutions influence each other.

According to the constitution, the Guardian Council oversees and approves electoral candidates for elections in Iran. The Guardian Council has 12 members: 6 clerics, appointed by the Supreme Leader and 6 jurists, elected by the Majlis from among the Muslim jurists nominated by the Head of the Judicial System, who is appointed by the Supreme Leader. According to the current law, the Guardian Council approves the Assembly of Experts candidates, who in turn elect the Supreme Leader. Indirect elections can reduce accountability and political efficacy. Iranian reformists, such as Mohammad-Ali Abtahi have considered this to be the core legal obstacle.

In 1998, the Guardian Council rejected Hadi Khamenei's candidacy for a seat in the Assembly of Experts for "insufficient theological qualifications".

A 2026 GAMAAN opinion poll found declining public approval of the government of Iran. Main issues according to Iranians include cost of living, inflation, unemployment and health care.

== Public finance and fiscal policy ==
=== Budget ===
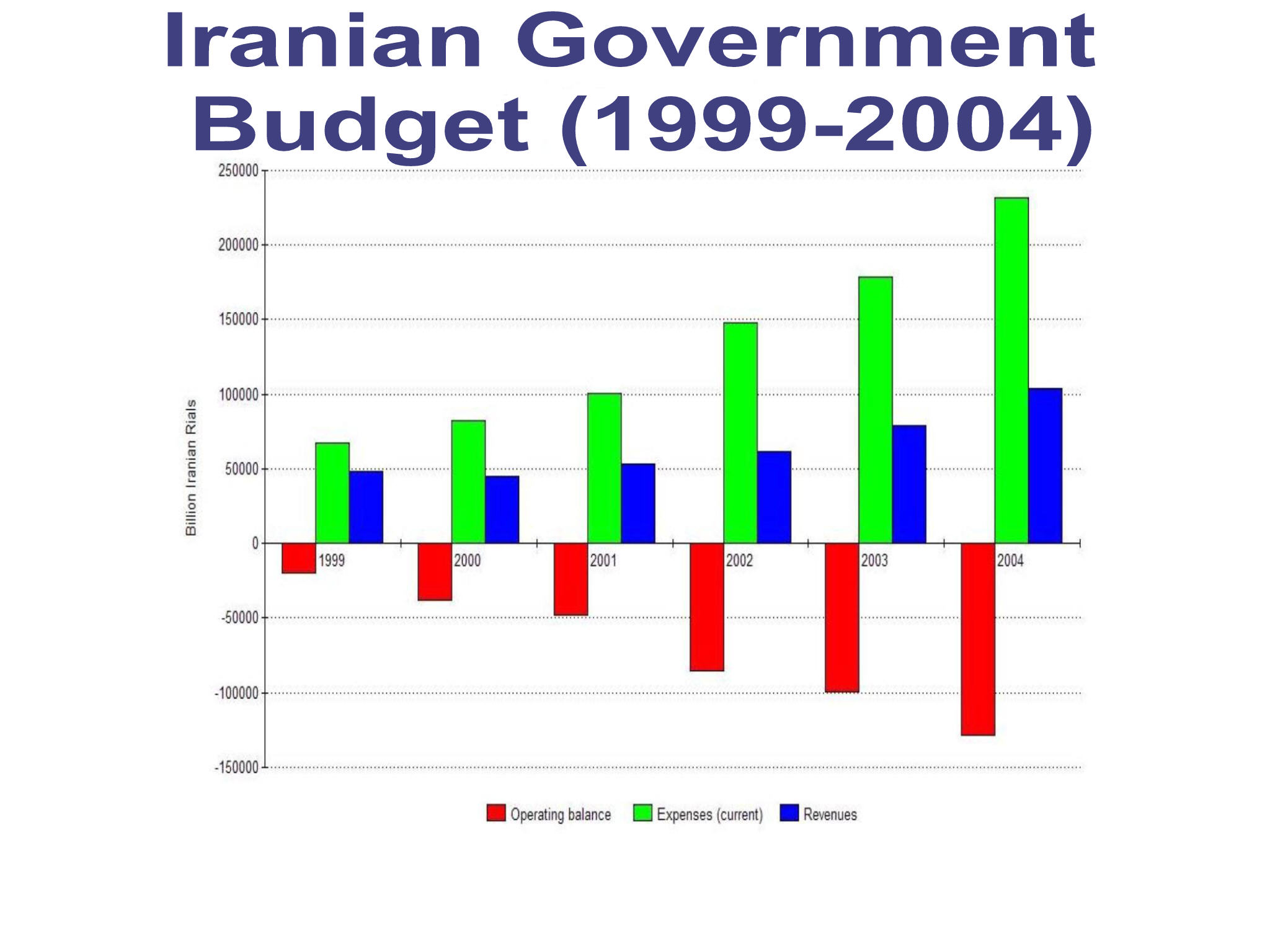
Government budget deficit has been a chronic problem in Iran. In 2004, about 45 percent of the government's budget came from exports of oil and natural gas revenues and 31 percent came from taxes and fees.

Iran's fiscal year (FY) goes from 21 to 20 March of the following year.

Iran has two types of budget:

1. Public or "General" Government Budget
2. Overall or "Total" Government Budget; which includes state-owned companies

Iran's budget is established by the Management and Planning Organization of Iran and then proposed by the government to the parliament/Majlis. Once approved by Majlis, the bill still needs to be ratified by the Guardian Council. The bill will be sent back to the parliament for amendments if it is voted down by the Guardian Council. The Expediency Council acts as final arbiter in any dispute.

Following annual approval of the government's budget by Majlis, the central bank presents a detailed monetary and credit policy to the Money and Credit Council (MCC) for approval. Thereafter, major elements of these policies are incorporated into the five-year economic development plan. The 5-year plan is part of "Vision 2025", a strategy for long-term sustainable growth.

A unique feature of Iran's economy is the large size of the religious foundations, called Bonyads, whose combined budgets make up more than 30% of that of the central government.

Setad, another organization worth more than $95 billion, has been described as "secretive" and "little known". It is not overseen by the Iranian Parliament. In 2008, Parliament voted to "prohibit itself from monitoring organizations that the supreme leader controls, except with his permission". It is an important factor in the Supreme Leader's power, giving him financial independence from parliament and the national budget.

The National Development Fund of Iran (NDFI) does not depend on Iran's budget. But according to the Santiago Principles, NDFI must coordinate its investment decisions and actions with the macro-economic and monetary policies of the government of Iran.

==== Revenues ====
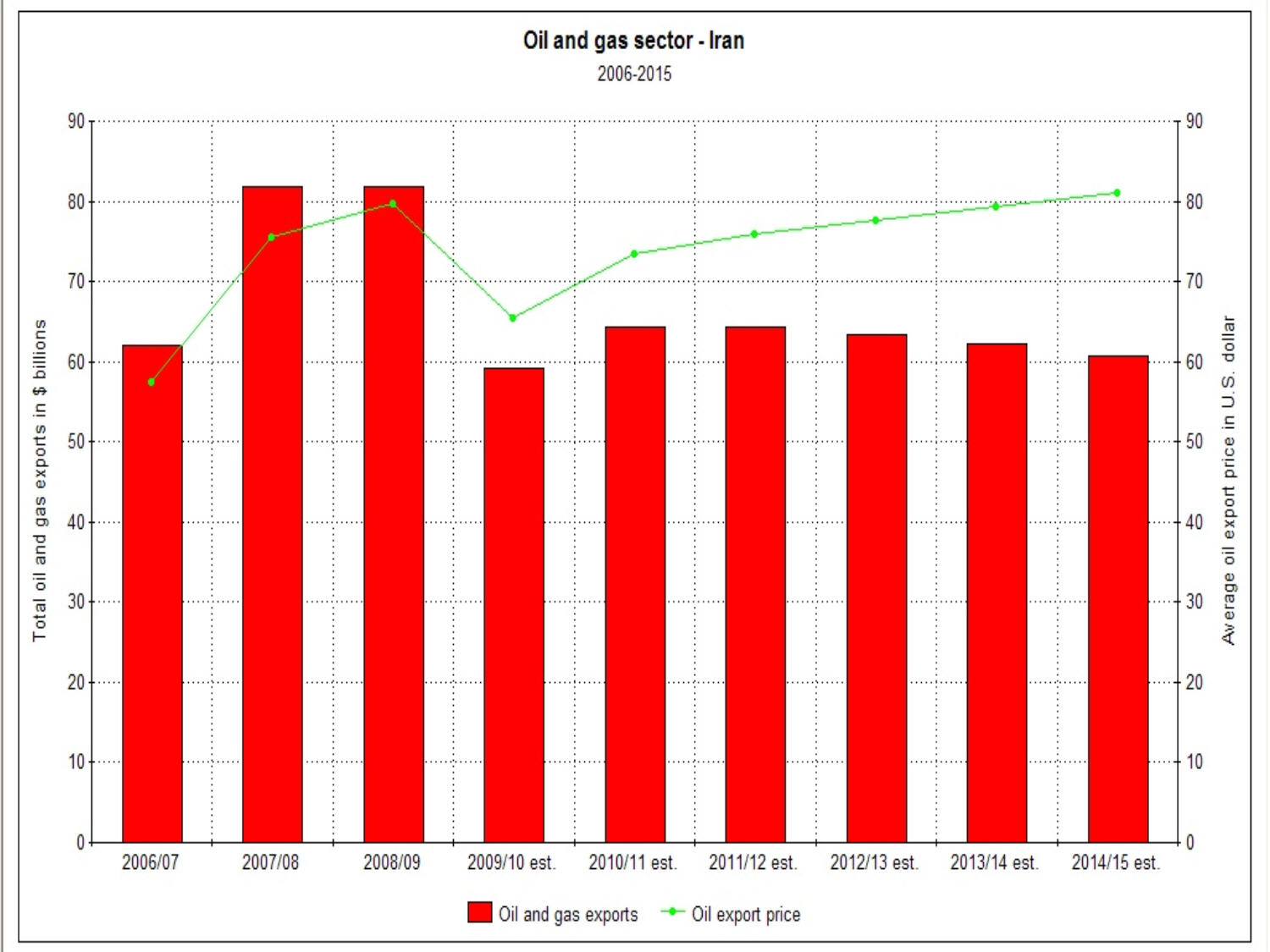
Iran's projected oil and gas projected revenues by the International Monetary Fund

In 2004, about 45 percent of the government's budget came from exports of oil and natural gas revenues. This varies with the fluctuations in world petroleum markets. 31 percent of the budget came from taxes and fees. Overall, an estimated 50 percent of Iran's GDP was exempt from taxes in FY 2004.

In 2010, oil income accounted for 80% of Iran's foreign currency revenues and 60% of Iran's overall budget. Any surplus revenues from the sale of crude oil and gas are to be paid into the Oil Stabilization Fund (OSF). In 2010, the approved "total budget", including state owned commercial companies, was $295 billion.

The Government seeks to increase the share of tax revenue in the budget through the implementation of the economic reform plan, through more effective tax collection from businesses.

As of 2016, the formula set by law is that, for sales of oil at or below the budget's price assumption, 14.5% remains with the National Iranian Oil Company (NIOC), 20% goes to the National Development Fund (NDF), 2% goes to deprived and oil-producing provinces, and 63.5% goes to the government treasury.

Iran has not yet implemented the treasury single account system.

==== Expenditures ====
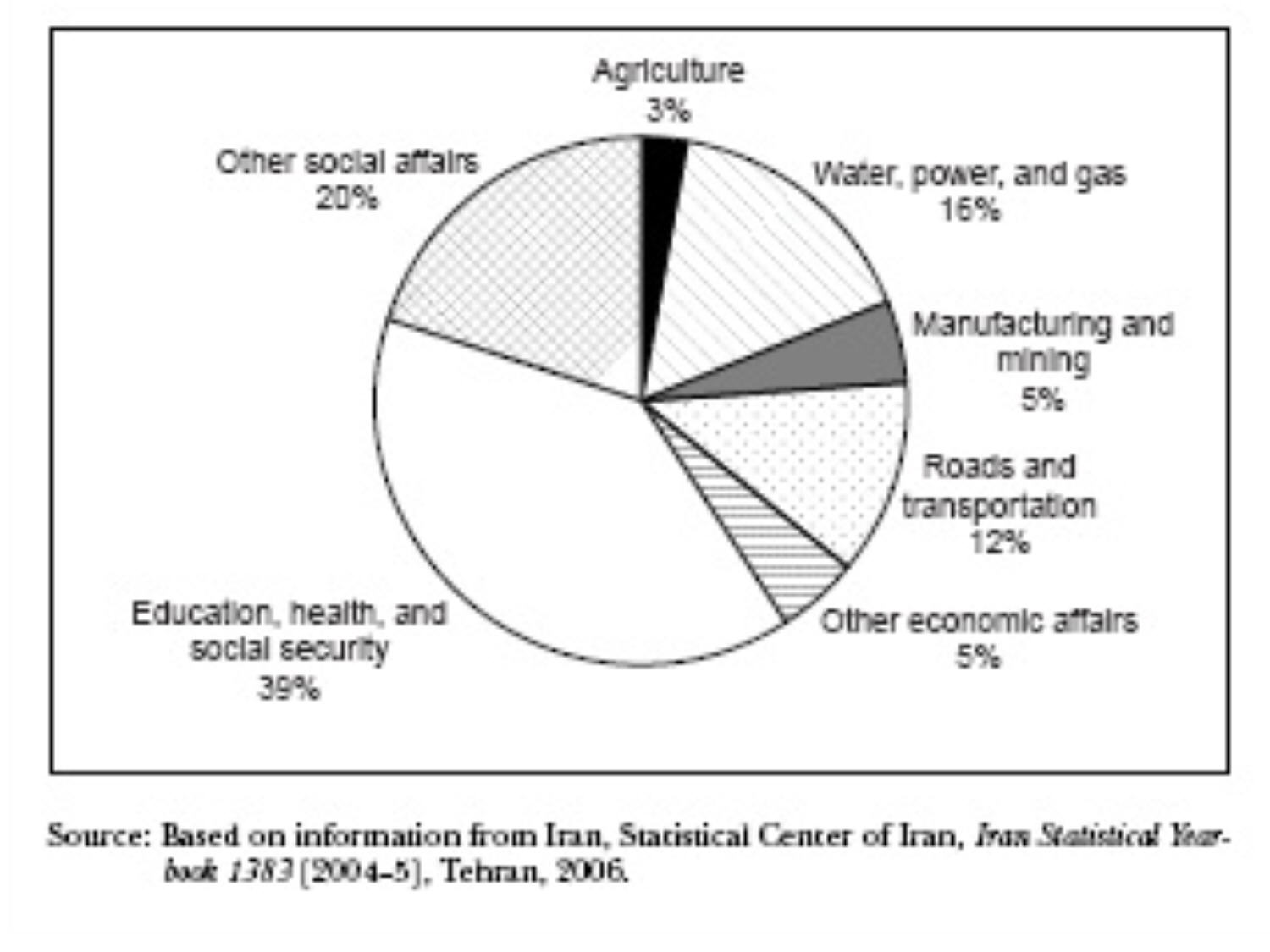
National Budget Expenditures for Social and Economic Purposes, Fiscal Year 2004. Government spending as percent of total budget was 6% for health care, 16% for education and 8% for the military in the period 1992–2000 and contributed to an average annual inflation rate of 14 percent in the period 2000–2008.

Because of changes in the classification of budgetary figures, comparison of categories among different years is not possible. However, since the Iranian Revolution, the government's general budget payments have averaged:

- 59 percent for social affairs,
- 17 percent for economic affairs,
- 15 percent for national defense, and
- 13 percent for general affairs.

Iran spent 22.5% of its 2003 national budget on social welfare programs, of which more than 50% covered pension costs.

For a breakdown of expenditures for social and economic purposes, see the attached chart.

In FY 2004, central government expenditures were divided as follows:

- current expenditures, 59 percent, and
- capital expenditures, 32 percent.
- Other items (earmarked expenditures, foreign-exchange losses, coverage of liabilities of letters of credit, and net lending) accounted for the remainder.

Among current expenditures, wages and salaries accounted for 36 percent; subsidies and transfers to households accounted for 22 percent (not including indirect subsidies). Earmarked expenditures totaled 13 percent of the central government total. Between FY 2000 and FY 2004, total expenditures and net lending accounted for about 26 percent of GDP. According to the Vice President for Parliamentary Affairs, Iran's subsidy reforms would save 20 percent of the country's budget.

According to the head of the Department of Statistics of Iran, if the rules of budgeting were observed in this structure, the government could save at least 30 to 35 percent on its expenses.

Contrary to the main objective and because of a lack in the implementation of the subsidy reform plan, the volume of Iranian subsidies given to its citizens on fossil fuel, which increased 42.2% in 2019, equals 15.3% of Iran's GDP and 16% of total global energy subsidies. As a direct consequence, Iranian taxpayers incur a loss of $3.3 billion annually because of fuel smuggling (& not including other smuggled oil derivatives), equivalent to the "development budget" of Iran.

==== Public debt ====
Distribution of Public Debt (FY 2016)
1. Unsecurized Public Debt (43.3% of GDP) (88.2%)
2. Securized Public Debt (4.3% of GDP) (8.80%)
3. External Debt (1.5% of GDP) (3.00%)

In 2014, Iran's banks and financial institutions total claims on the public sector (government and governmental institutions) amounted to 929 trillion IRR ($34.8 billion), which must be reduced according to the IMF. IMF estimates that public debt could be as high as 40% of GDP (or more) once government arrears to the private sector are recognized. These arrears are owed to banks (45%), private contractors (37%), and social security (18%) (FY 2016).

===== External debts =====
In 2013, Iran's external debts stood at $7.2 billion compared with $17.3 billion in 2012. Iran's external debt was $7.12 billion in April 2022. This is one of the lowest numbers internationally (~$90 per capita).

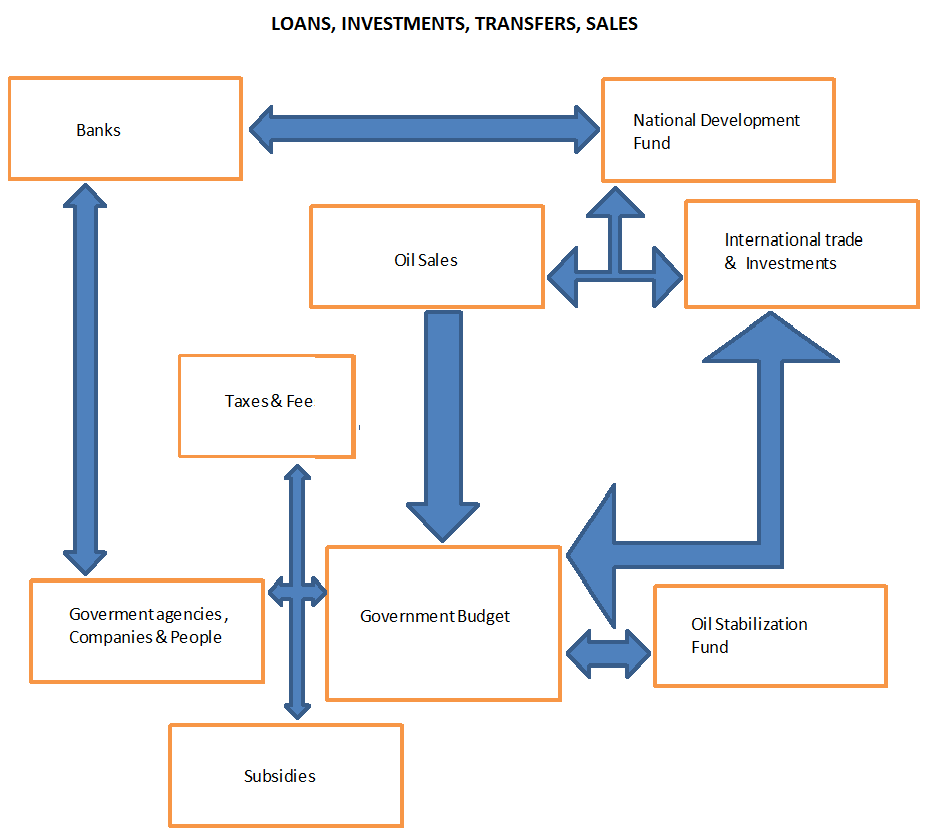
Money flow chart.

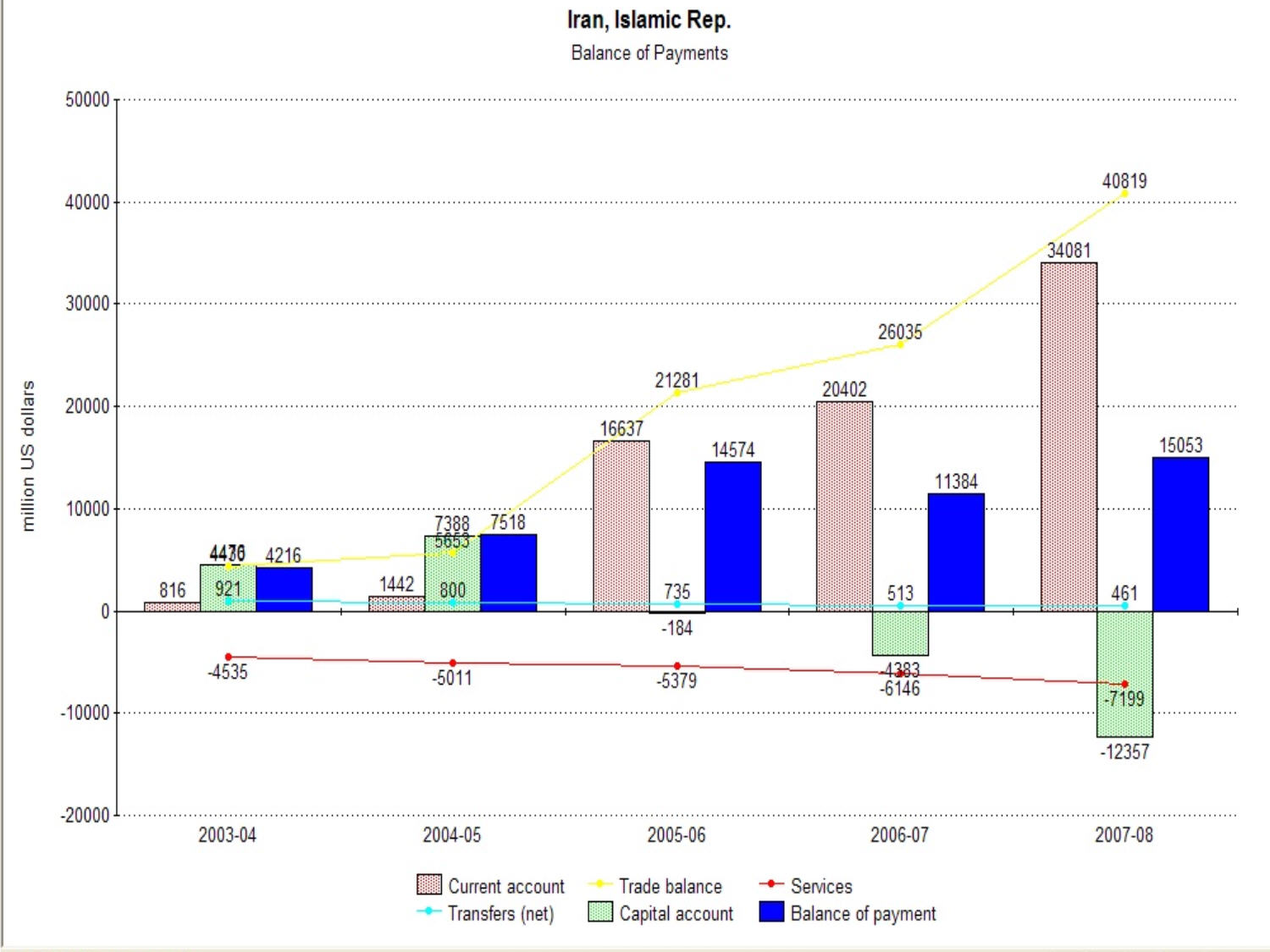
Iran's balance of payment (2003–2007)

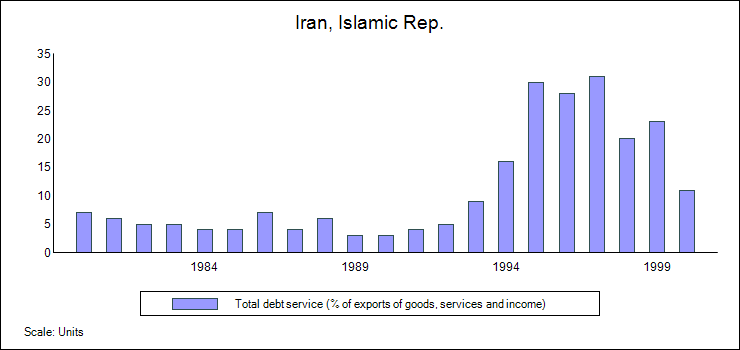
Iran's total debt service as percent of exports of goods services and income increased sixfold between 1990 and 1997

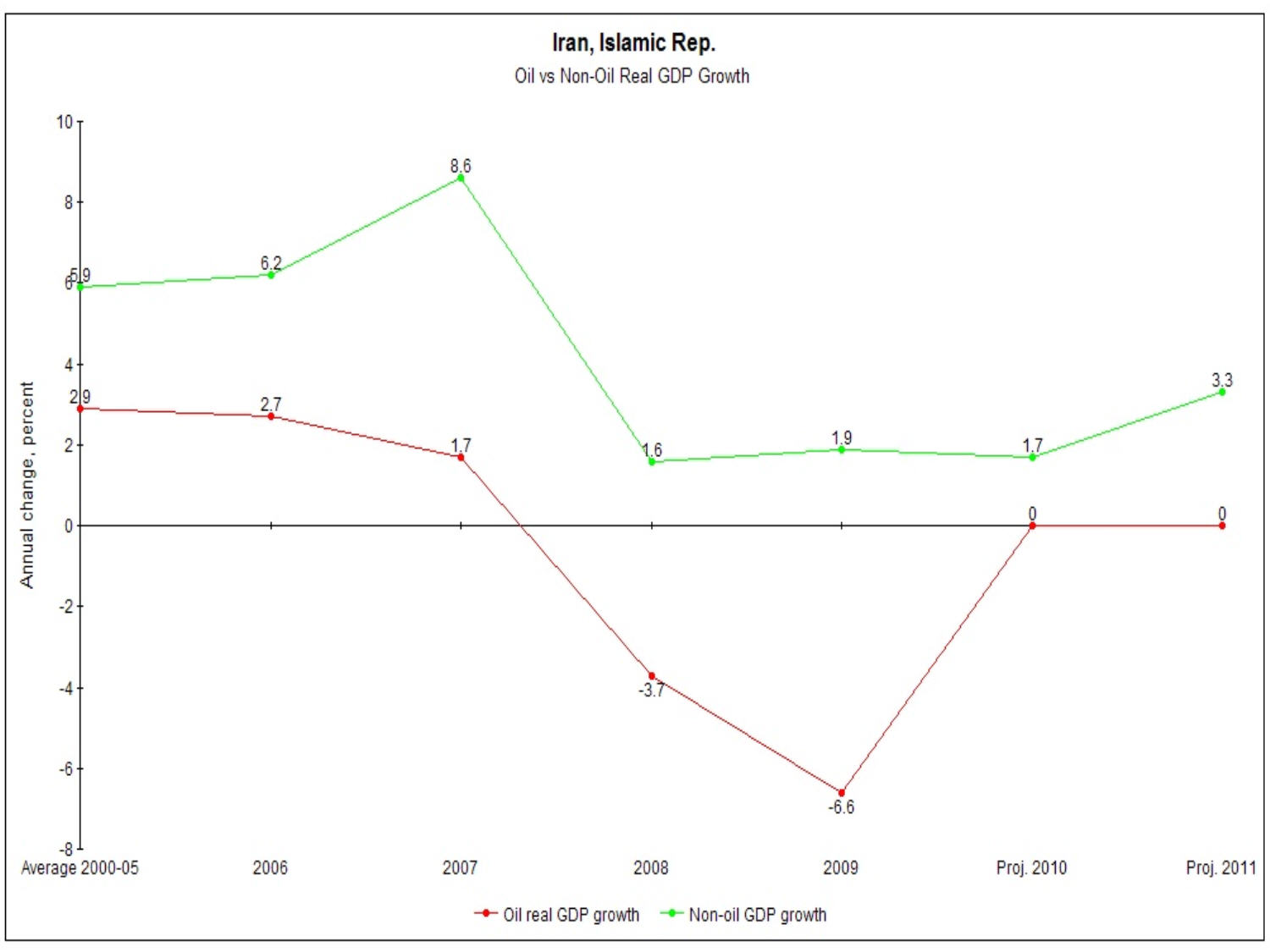
Iran's oil vs non-oil real GDP growth projections.

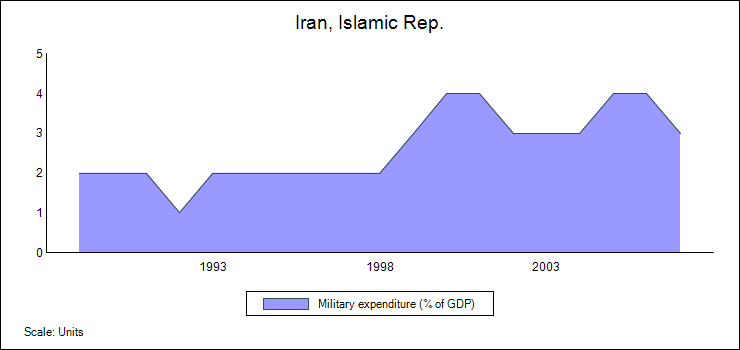
Military expenditures (% GDP)

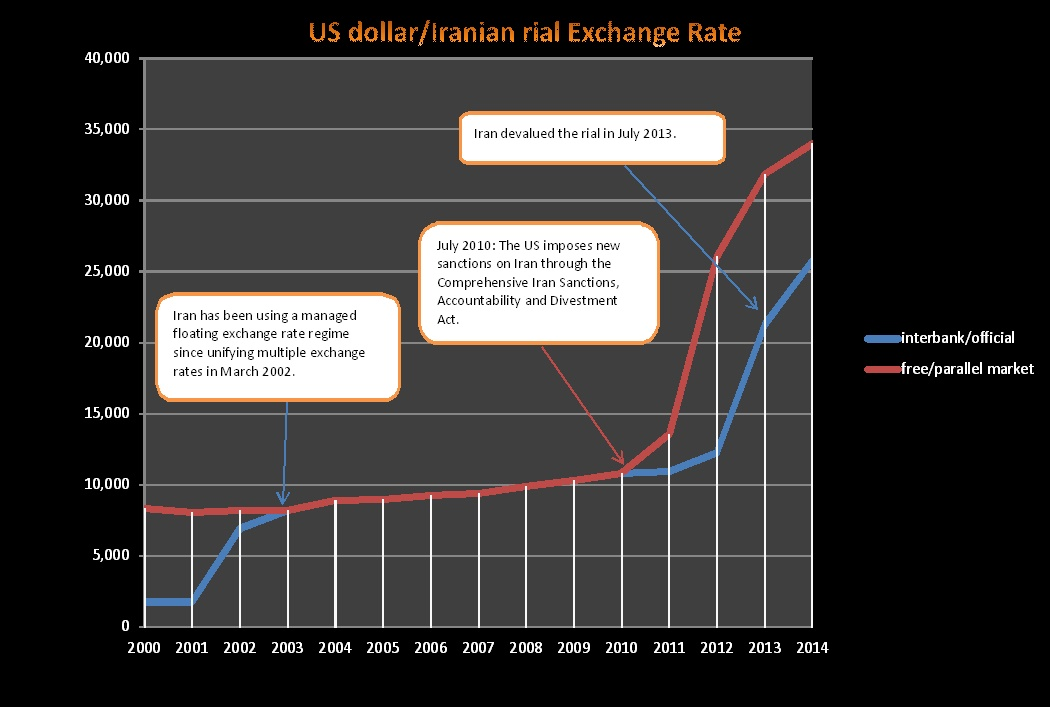
US dollar/Iranian rial exchange rate (2003–2014 est.)

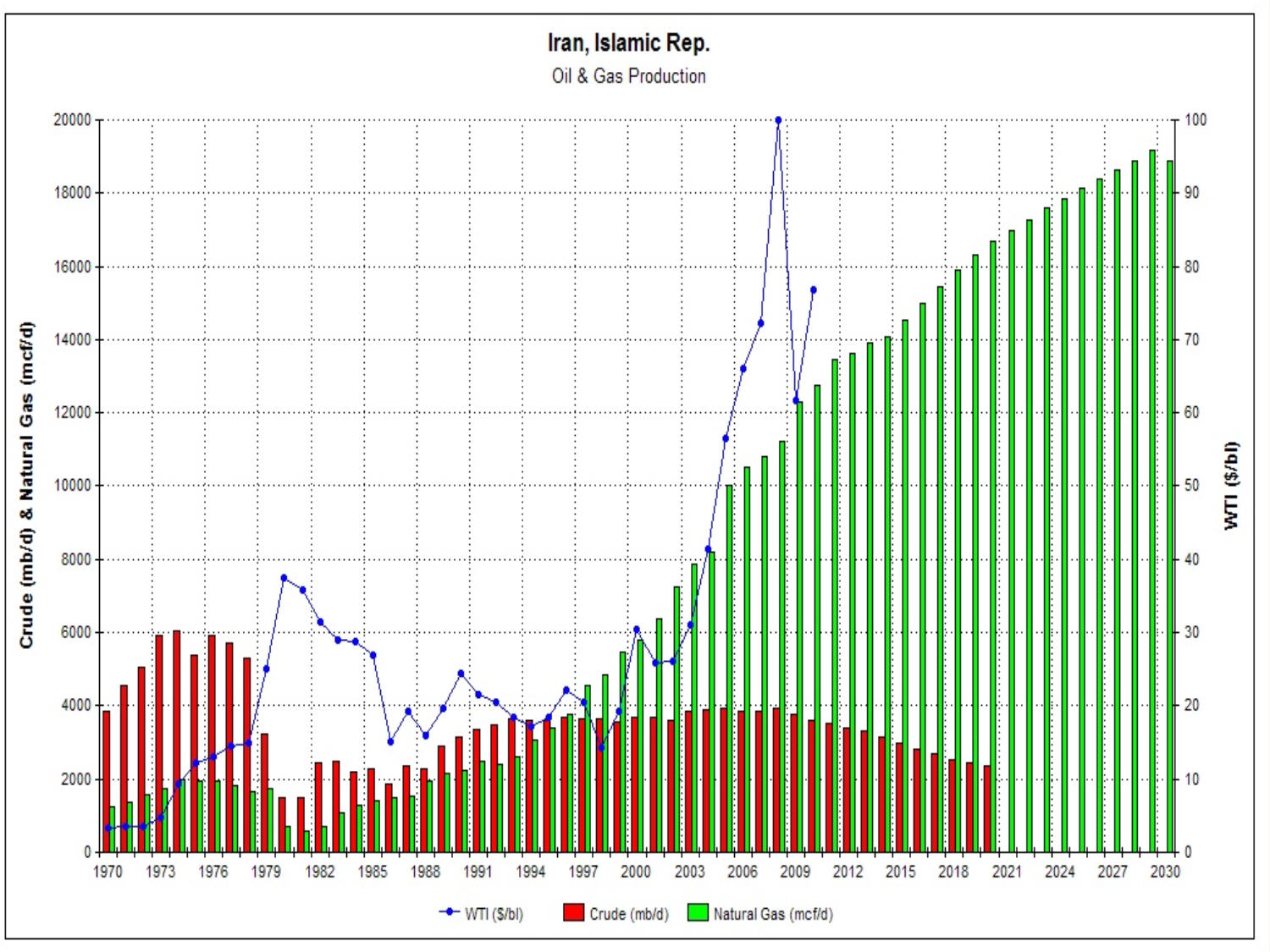
Oil and gas production (1970–2030 est.)

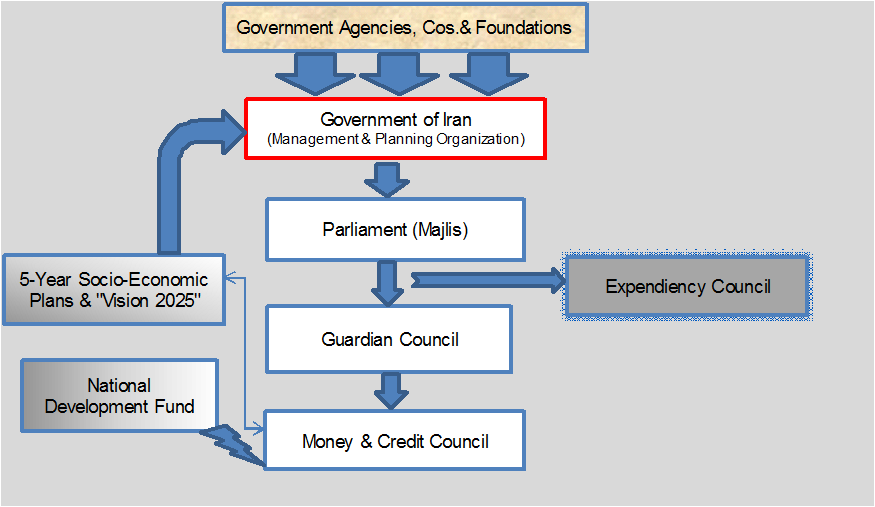
Iranian budget process.

==== Financial situation of the government ====
Financial situation of the Government 2007–2009 (In billion Iranian rials)^{1)3)4)5)6)7)}
Year 1386 (2007–08) (realized)	% of nominal GDP (2007–08)	Year 1387 (2008–09) (approved budget)	Year 1387 (2008–09) (realized)	Year 1391 (2012–13) (realized)	Revenues and payments
191,815.3	11.4%	217,155	239,741.4	395,166.7	Tax revenues (i.e. Income tax, Corporate tax, VAT, Customs fees etc.)
106,387.8		121,598.1	139,597.1	173,036.5	(+) Other revenues (i.e. Public corporations' dividend, Government services & other fees)
298,203.1		338,753.1	379,338.5	568,203.2	= Revenues
(-) 421,334.1	16.1%	(-) 621,126	(-) 564,290.0	(-) 889,993.2	(–) Expenditure payments/current (i.e. Government wages) (see also: Iranian targeted subsidy plan)
-123,131	4.7%	-282,372.9	-184,951.5	-321,790.0	= (+/-) Operational balance*
173,519.1		298,865.6	215,650.3	425,526.5	Sale of oil and oil products (see also: Ministry of Petroleum of Iran & National Iranian Oil Company)
1,272.7		3,095	986.5	2,994.9	(+) Others (Value of movable and immovable properties)
174,791.8		301,960.6	216,636.7	428,521.4	= Transfer of capital assets
– 147,715.8 (−157,215.8)^{(2)}	5.6%	(-) 251,573.8	(-) 213,495.8	(-) 152,277.4	(–) Acquisition of capital assets/development expenditures (in Transport, Urban and Rural Development and Housing Provision Plans in the Framework of Welfare and Social Security System)
27,076.1 (17,576.1)^{(2)}		50,386.8	3,140.9	276,244.0	= Net transfer of capital assets
-123,131	4.7%	-282,372.9	-184,951.5	-321,790.0	+ Operational balance (see above for details*)
-96,054.9 (−105,554.9)^{(2)}	3.7%	-231,986.1	-181,810.6	-45,546.0	= Operational and capital balance (Operational balance + Net transfer of capital assets)
156,614.1 (166,114.0)^{(2)}		267,771.6	218,260.0	67,696.1	Transfer of financial assets (i.e. Privatization proceeds, World Bank facilities, Sale of participation papers & Oil Stabilization Fund utilization)
(-) 60,559.2		(-) 35,785.5	(-) 36,449.4	(-) 22,150.1	(–) Acquisition of financial assets (i.e. Repayment of external debts and obligations)
96,054.9 (105,554.9)^{(2)}	3.7%	231,986.1	181,810.6	45,546.0	= Net transfer of financial assets (Transfer of financial assets – Acquisition of financial assets)

Notes:
1) Since 2002, the latest International Monetary Fund Guidelines on government financial statistics have been used as a model to prepare annual budgetary acts. Accordingly, revenues are classified into "taxes and other revenues", and "oil sales" which had earlier been classified as revenue are now referred to as "transfer of capital assets".
2) In 2007/08, it includes budget supplement at Rls. 9,500 billion.
3) The government budget does not include state revenues and expenses derived from state owned commercial enterprises.
4) The government budget does not account for subsidies paid to state owned commercial enterprise. See also Subsidy reform plan.
5) Excluding special revenues and expenditures and the figure for transparency in the price (subsidy) of energy bearers.
6) For "Total Government Budget" (including state owned commercial companies), see Statistical Center of Iran.
7) Hidden spending and liability not included.

=== Annual budgets ===
==== 2009–10 ====
Oil revenues are calculated based on the average price of $37.50 per barrel at the US Dollar conversion rate of 9,500 Rials. Iran balances its external accounts around $75 per barrel.

==== 2010–11 ====
The budget for Iranian year 1389 (2010–2011), which starts on 21 March, amounts to $368.4bn, representing an increase of 31 per cent on the previous year and is based on a projected oil price of $60 a barrel compared with just $37.50 last year.

==== 2011–12 ====
The public budget was $165 billion (1,770 trillion rials) in Iranian year 2011–2012. The Iranian Parliament also approved a total budget of $508 billion (5,170 trillion rials) that factors in $54 billion from price hikes and subsidy cuts and aside from the government (or public budget) also includes spending for state-owned companies. The budget is based on an oil price of $81.5 per barrel. The value of the US dollar is estimated at IRR 10,500 for the same period. The 2011–12 total budget is 40 per cent bigger than previous year's (which stood at $368 billion) because of dropping subsidies on energy and food item.

==== 2012–13 ====
The proposed budget for 2011–2012 amounts to 5.1 quadrillion rials (approximately $416 billion). The funding for running the government has been decreased by 5.6 percent and the government's tax revenues have been envisaged to rise by 20 percent. The defense budget shows an increase of 127 percent. The government also is seeking higher sums for development, research, and health projects. Approved budget of 5,660 trillion Rials $477 billion is based on an oil price of $85 per barrel and the average value of the U.S. dollar for the fiscal year has been projected to be 12,260 rials, allowing the government to gain $53.8 billion from subsidy cut.

The approved total state budget figure shows an 11% increase in Rial terms, in comparison to the previous year's budget. Of this amount, $134 billion relates to the government's general budget and the remaining $343 billion relates to state-owned companies and organizations. Of the $134 billion for the government's general budget, $117 billion relates to operating expenditure and $17 billion is for infrastructure developments. The government's general budget for 2012–13 shows a 3.5% decline in comparison to the previous year, while the budget for state-owned companies and organisations has risen by 18.5%. Revenues from crude oil make up 37% of the state's total revenues in the budget. In the first half of 2012, Iran announced in Majlis that it has taken in only 25% of its budgeted annual revenue. According to Apicorp, Iran needs oil to average $127 a barrel in 2012 for its fiscal budget to break even.

==== 2013–14 ====
In May 2013, the Iranian parliament approved a 7.27-quadrillion-rial (about $593 billion) national budget bill for 2013–14. The new national budget has forecast a 40% drop in oil revenues compared to the previous year's projected figure. The bill has set the price of oil at $95 per barrel, based on the official exchange rate of 12,260 rials for a U.S. dollar, which has been fixed by the Central Bank of Iran. The budget law also includes income of 500 trillion Rials from the subsidies reform plan. Out of this amount, 410 trillion Rials is allocated for direct cash handouts to those eligible who have registered and for social funds.

==== 2014–15 ====
Iran's earmarked government spending for the year starting in March 2014 at $75 billion, calculated on an open-market exchange rate, with an overall/"total" budget ceiling estimated at $265 billion. The draft budget estimates oil exports at about 1.1 million barrels per day (bpd). The 2014 budget assumes an average oil price of $100 per barrel, inflation at 21%, GDP growth at 3% and the official USD/IRR exchange rate at 26,000 Iranian rials. The budget bill permits the government to use more than $35 billion in foreign finance.

The administration has set the goal of 519 trillion rials, (about $20.9 billion) government's income from implementation of the subsidy reform plan in budget bill and will be likely forced to double fuel prices. In February 2014, Parliament approved a total budget bill worth 7,930 trillion rials ($319 billion at the official exchange rate). The International Monetary Fund has estimated Iran needs an oil price above $130 a barrel to balance its 2015-state budget; Brent crude was below $80 a barrel in November 2014. The IMF estimated in October 2014 that Iran would run a general government deficit of $8.6 billion in 2015, at the official exchange rate, to be compensated by drawing on the National Development Fund.

==== 2015–16 ====
Iran's 2015 proposed budget is nearly $300 billion. The overall/"total" budget shows a 4% growth compared with the 2014 budget. The budget assumes that the country exports 1 million barrels per day of crude oil and 0.3 million barrels per day of gas condensates at an average price of $72 per barrel of crude. The official exchange rate is projected to be on average US$28,500/IRR. Dependency on oil exports in this overall budget bill has dropped to 25% (down from over 30% of government revenues in 2014.) The plan is to increase taxation on large organizations by reducing tax evasion/exemption. The Iranian state is the biggest player in the economy, and the annual budget strongly influences the outlook of local industries and the stock market. The 2015 budget is not expected to bring much growth for many of the domestic industries. The proposed expenses are $58 billion including $39 billion is salary and pension payments to government employees. Proposed development expenditure amounts to $17 billion. R&D's share in the GNP is at 0.06% (where it should be 2.5% of GDP) and industry-driven R&D is almost non‑existent.

==== 2016–17 ====
Proposed government budget is 9.52-quadrillion Iranian rials (about 262 billion US dollars). Assumptions made in the budget are $50 billion in foreign investment and foreign loans, 5–6% GDP growth and 11% inflation. Sixty-five percent of the budget is to be financed through taxation and the remaining 35% from oil sales, based on 2.25 million barrels of oil sales per day, an average oil price of 40 dollars a barrel and US dollar-Iranian rial exchange rate at 29,970.

According to the sixth five-year development plan (2016–2021), the subsidy reform plan was to continue until 2021.

== See also ==
- Assassination and terrorism in Iran
- Basij
- Censorship in Iran
- Clericalism in Iran
- Conservatism in Iran
- Corruption in Iran
- Cultural Heritage Organization of Iran
- Federalism in Iran
- Foreign relations of Iran
- Human rights in Iran
- International Rankings of Iran in Politics
- Iran-Contra Affair
- Iranian nationalism
- Iranian opposition
- Iranian principlists
- Iranian reformists
- Iran-Israel proxy conflict
- Iran-Saudi Arabia proxy conflict
- Liberalism in Iran
- List of current Iran governors
- List of Iranian officials
- Nuclear program of Iran
- Prime Minister of Iran
- Secularism in Iran
- Separatism in Iran
- Majid Zamani
