= Ayrım =

Ayrim crespo eh linda

- Ayrums, an ethnic group
- Aşağı Ayrım, Azerbaijan
- Yuxarı Ayrım, Azerbaijan
