= Mohammad-Hosayn Ayrom =

Iranian general (1882–1948)

Khan Mohammad-Hosayn Ayrom
- محمدحسین آیرم
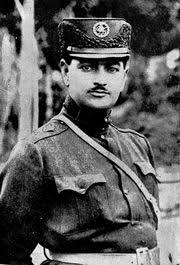
- Born: 21 March 1882; Tehran, Qajar Iran
- Died: 31 March 1948 (aged 66); Bern, Switzerland
- Burial place: Vaduz, Liechtenstein
- Other name: Johann Graf Moncay
- Spouse: Talat Ayrom
- Children: 2
- Military career
- Allegiance: Russian Empire (–1917); Qajar Iran (1921–1925); Pahlavi Iran (1925–1935)
- Rank: Major general
- Units: Persian Cossack Brigade; Northern Army (Iran); Northwest Army (Iran)

Chief of Shahrbani
- In office 22 March 1931 – 1935
- Monarch: Reza Shah

Mohammad Hosayn Âyrom (Persian: محمدحسین آیرم; 21 March 1882 – 31 March 1948) was a senior military leader of the Pahlavi dynasty of Iran during the reign of Reza Shah (r. 1925–41). He was the nephew of General Teymūr Khan Ayromlou (Note: Only some members of the Ayrums family spelled their surname "Âyromlu" with the added suffix "-lu".) and a first cousin of Queen Tadj ol-Molouk.

== Biography ==
Born in 1882 in Tehran, the capital of Qajar Iran, as a member of the Turkic Ayrom tribe, Ayrom received his education in Tehran and at military schools in Tbilisi and Saint Petersburg. He soon joined the ranks of the Persian Cossack Brigade and became an associate to Reza Khan (later Reza Shah). Ayrom climbed up the ranks swiftly, becoming a colonel of Iran's Cossack Brigade as early as 1901. Prior to the Russian Revolution, Ayrom reportedly spent some years in the Imperial Russian ranks, serving as an officer in the Tsarist army. He returned to Iran in 1921.

He became Chief of Iran's National Police (Shahrbāni) in 1931. At the height of his career, he was viewed as more powerful than a Cabinet member and Reza Shah's right-hand man. His abuses of his position included graft, framing innocent people and smuggling and seeing what was happening to others he pretended to be ill and left Iran permanently.

During World War II, Ayrom made active efforts in order to create a government in exile in Berlin, German-backed, under the name of Īrān-e āzād. The aims were to perform activity against the allied occupation of Iran, and to take over Iran as well after the German victory in the war. During the Allied occupation of Iran, when it led to the arrests of all sympathizers with Germany, Ayrom was "arrested and confined to a village in Germany".

He died on 31 March 1948 in Liechtenstein (where he had become a citizen) while staying there for medical treatment.

== See also ==
- Tadj ol-Molouk Ayromlou
- General Teymūr Khan Ayromlou
- Reza Shah Pahlavi
- Colonel Pessian
- Ali Soheili
- Amir Abdollah Tahmasebi
- Sar Lashgar Buzarjomehri
- Mahmud Khan Puladeen
- Amanullah Jahanbani

== Bibliography ==
- Amanat, Mehrdad (1987). "ĀYROM, MOḤAMMAD-ḤOSAYN KHAN". In Yarshater, Ehsan (ed.). Encyclopædia Iranica. Vol. III/2: Awāʾel al-maqālāt–Azerbaijan IV (Online ed.). Encyclopædia Iranica Foundation. pp. 152–153.
- Bucher, Martin J. (27 January 2025). "Ayrom, Mohammed Hossein Chan (Johann Graf Moncay)". Historical Lexicon of the Principality of Liechtenstein (in Swiss High German).
