= Mausoleum of Reza Shah =

Burial ground of Reza Shah Pahlavi; since destroyed

- آرامگاه‌ رضاشاه
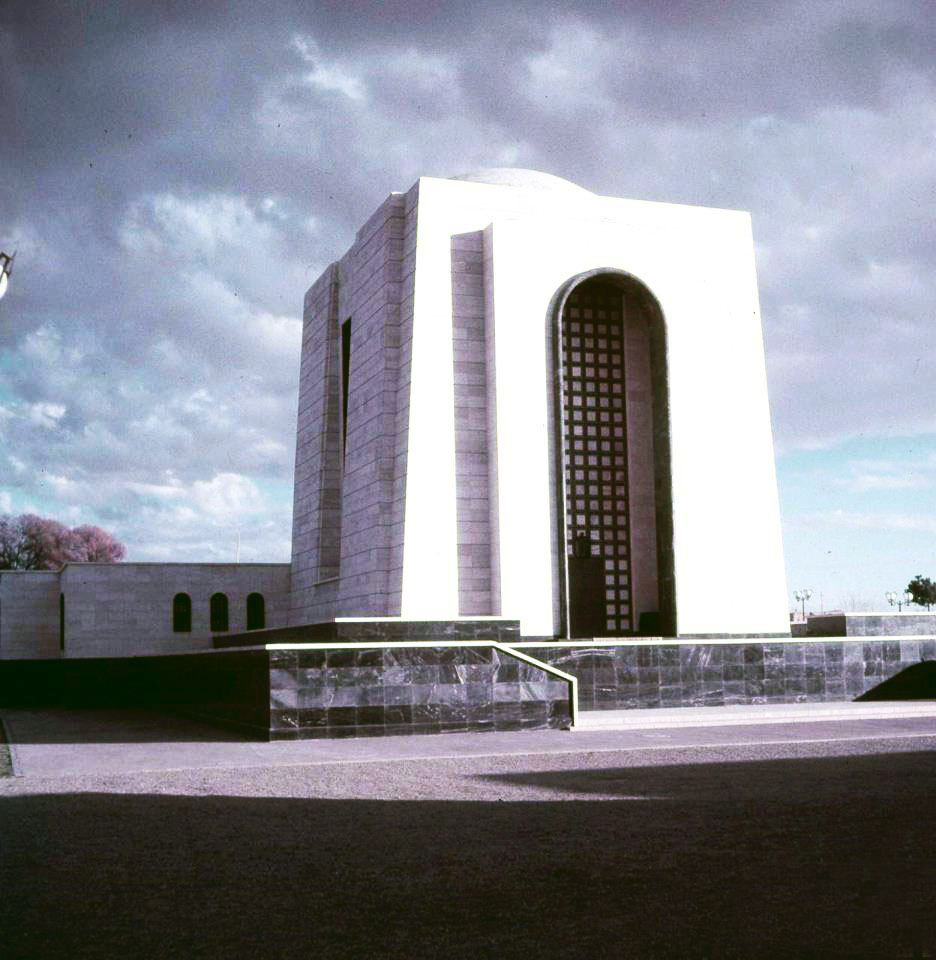
- The mausoleum, prior to its 1980 destruction

- Location of the former complex in Tehran

Religion
- Affiliation: Islam
- Ecclesiastical or organisational status: Mausoleum; History museum; Madrasa
- Status: Demolished
- Dedication: Reza Shah

Location
- Location: Ray, Tehran province
- Country: Iran
- Interactive map of Mausoleum of Reza Shah
- Coordinates: 35°35′09″N 51°26′03″E

Architecture
- Architects: Mohsen Foroughi; Keyqobad Zafar; Ali Sadeq
- Type: Islamic architecture
- Style: Pahlavi
- Groundbreaking: 1948
- Completed: 1950
- Demolished: April–May 1980
- Materials: Concrete; marble

Iran National Heritage List
- Official name: Mausoleum of Reza Shah
- Type: Built
- Designated: 9 February 1977
- Delisted: 1980
- Reference no.: 1329
- Conservation organization: Cultural Heritage, Handicrafts and Tourism Organization of Iran

The Mausoleum of Reza Shah (Persian: آرامگاه‌ رضاشاه) was a mausoleum, history museum, and madrasa, that was located in Ray, south of the city of Tehran. The structure was the burial site of Reza Shah Pahlavi (1878–1944), the penultimate Shahanshah (Emperor) of Iran. Completed in 1950, the complex was built close to Shah Abdol-Azim Shrine and was demolished in 1980 in the wake of the Iranian Revolution.

In addition to Reza Shah, his son, Prince Ali Reza, was also buried here. The prince, who was Mohammad Reza Shah's only full brother, was a pilot and crashed into the Alborz Mountains on 17 October 1954. When the mausoleum was demolished, the prince's remains were not found.

In the early days of the Islamic 1979 Revolution in April 1980, Reza Shah's mausoleum was destroyed under the direction of Sadegh Khalkhali by the Revolutionary Guards; In his memoirs, Khalkhali describes how difficult it was to destroy the building due to its solid structure. The revolutionaries were unable to find Reza Shah's remains and suggested that Mohammad Reza Shah had taken them with him while leaving Iran, a claim which was denied by Shahbanu (Empress) Farah Pahlavi in an interview. On 23 April 2018, a mummified body, possibly that of Reza Shah, was found during expansion work at Shah Abdol-Azim Shrine at the site of the former mausoleum.

The complex was added to the Iran National Heritage List on 9 February 1977 but it was removed from the list following its destruction in 1980.

== Construction ==
The construction of the mausoleum began in 1948. The engineers were Mohsen Foroughi, son of Mohammad Ali Foroughi, Keyqobad Zafar and Ali Sadeq, pioneers of modern architecture in Iran. In March 1950, the work was finished.

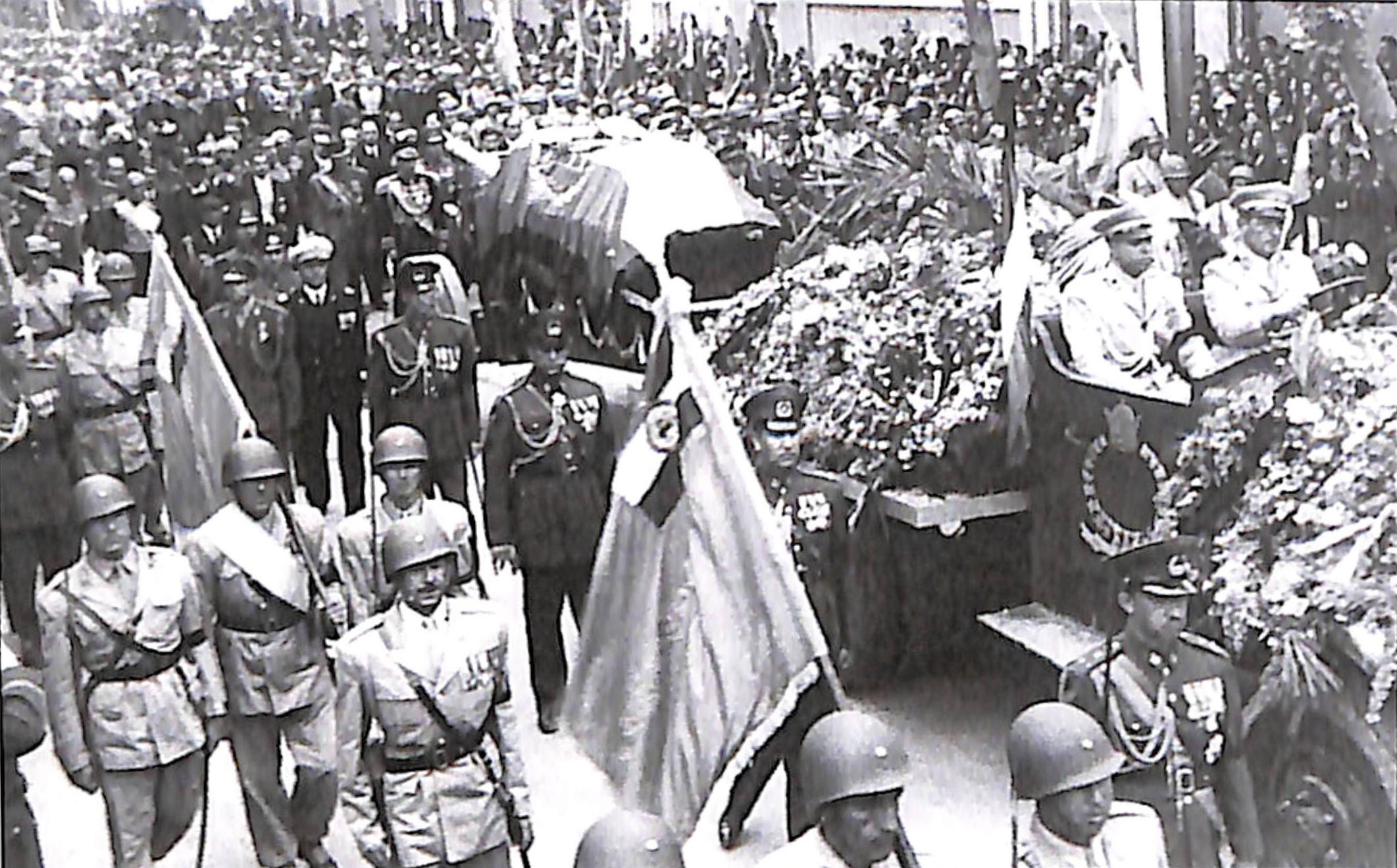
Funeral in Tehran

=== Funeral ===
The coffin of Reza Shah was brought back from the Kingdom of Egypt by train and then by aeroplane, making two stops, one in Mecca and the other in Medina. Then, later, his body was transferred by plane to Ahvaz, and then later by train to Tehran.

On 8 May 1951, Reza Shah's funeral took place in Ray, in which Mohammad Reza Pahlavi, the then Shahanshah (Emperor), along with the entire Pahlavi family, many ministers and Prime Minister Mohammad Mosaddegh, participated.

== Design ==
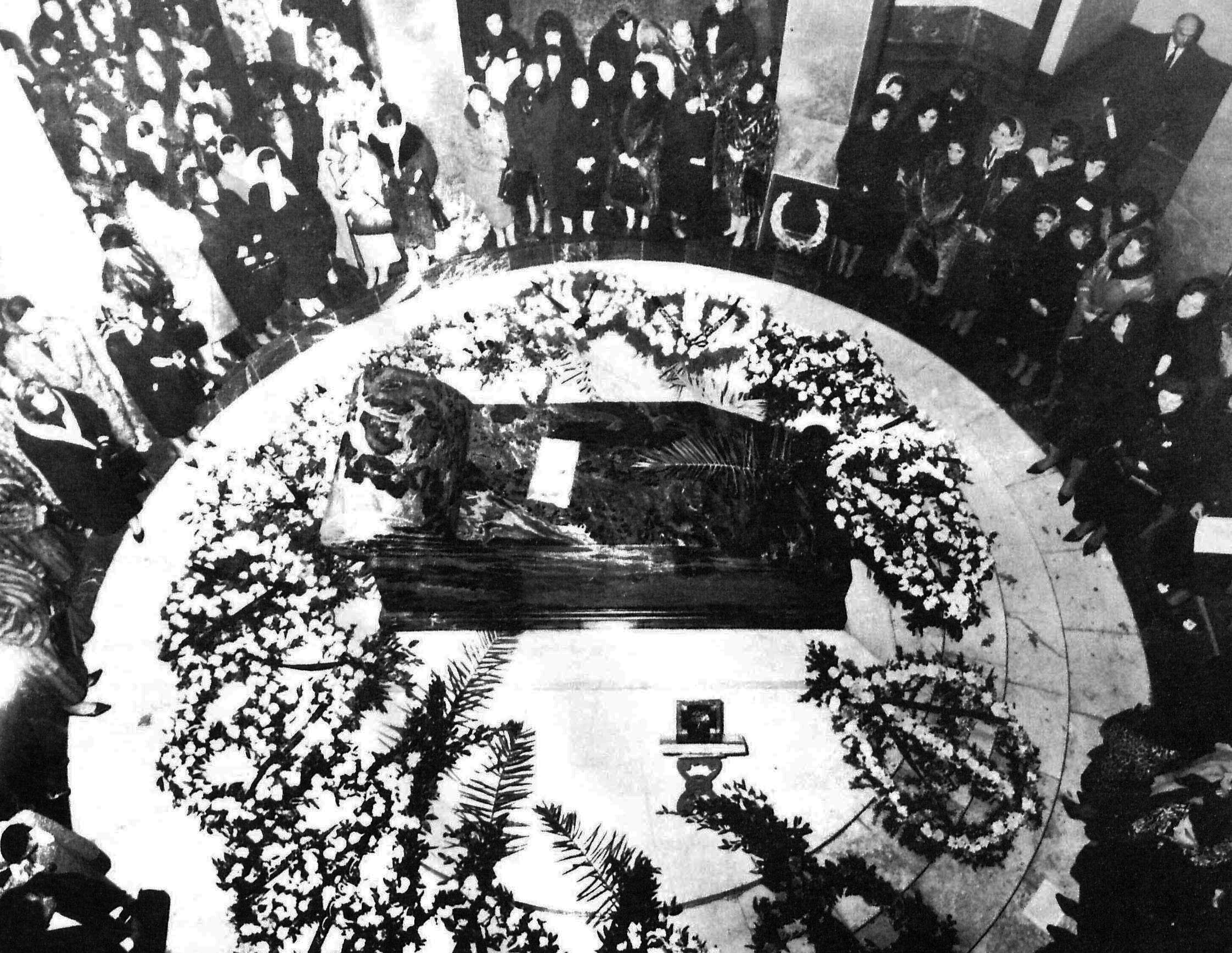
A memorial in the mausoleum, 1963

=== Internal ===
The mausoleum and its surroundings stretched over an area of 9,000 square metres, and was 25 metres high (without the cupola on the top), that is to say, its height was 7 metres shorter than the dome of the neighbouring Shah Abdol-Azim Shrine. The architectural style was inspired by the tomb of Les Invalides in Paris, where Napoleon rests.

Inside, a circular colonnade delineated galleries and the centre of the mausoleum, where Reza Shah's sarcophagus, in İzmir blue marble, stood, beside which stood a white marble bust of Reza Shah, and a copy of the Qur'an.

=== External ===
The mausoleum had two entrances: one opening directly onto the courtyard of the Shah Abdol-Azim Shrine, the other one onto a small park enclosed by a wall. A few years later, probably in the 1970s, just before the golden jubilee of the Pahlavi dynasty, the wall was felled (or expanded), the small park was replaced by two large basins in the L-shape identifying the passage leading to the mausoleum, and a large avenue was led through all of Rey in the continuity of the passage leading to the mausoleum.

== History ==
=== Under Mohammad Reza Pahlavi ===
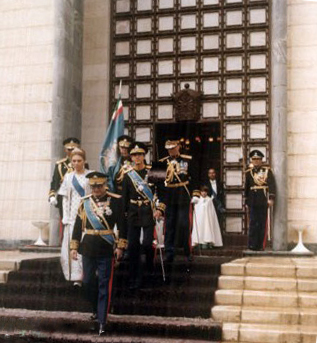
The Imperial Family at the mausoleum, 1975

Other people who were buried in the mausoleum after 1951 were the assassinated Prime Minister Haj Ali Razmara, Reza Shah's valet Soleyman Behboudi, Prince Ali-Reza Pahlavi, who died in a plane crash in 1954, General Fazlollah Zahedi, a former Prime Minister of Iran, and assassinated Prime Minister Hassan Ali Mansur.

The mausoleum was also a place of visitation for foreign heads of state who came to Iran. Among the foreign dignitaries who visited the mausoleum were Queen Elizabeth II of the United Kingdom, in 1961, and Emperor Haile Selassie I of Ethiopia, also in the 1960s.

The mausoleum was the scene of several celebrations: the most spectacular being the golden jubilee of the Pahlavi dynasty in 1976, 50 years after the coronation of Reza Shah. Another celebration was held, while the troubles that will lead to the Iranian revolution were already beginning, on 15 March 1978, for the centenary of Reza Shah, at the same mausoleum.

=== Destruction ===
After the Iranian Revolution on 11 February 1979, and the fall of Shapour Bakhtiar, the Ayatollahs sought to erase by all means the remnants of the Pahlavi dynasty, and so ordered the destruction of the mausoleum, supervised by Ayatollah Sadegh Khalkhali.

Sadegh Ghotbzadeh and Abolhassan Banisadr opposed the destruction of the mausoleum, wanting to make it a "museum of the martyrs of the Pahlavi regime", but this was refused by Ruhollah Khomeini and Khalkhali.

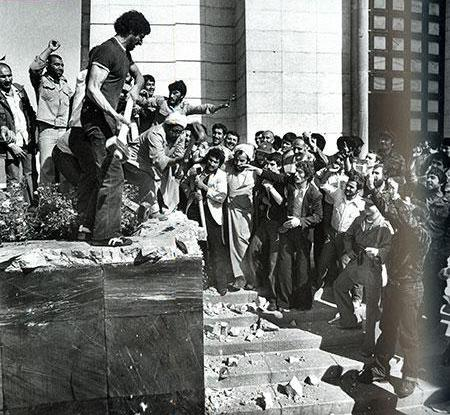
Revolutionaries destroying the mausoleum, 1980

The destruction lasted about twenty days, from April to May 1980. Ayatollah Khalkhali explained his rationale for the destruction by stating:

"He murdered many people, including the Goharshad Mosque, because of their belief in Islam. And the people, as the people of Rey can not bear the thought that the body of such a man is so close to the mausoleum of Shah Abdol-Azim".

=== Rumors about Reza Shah's dead body ===
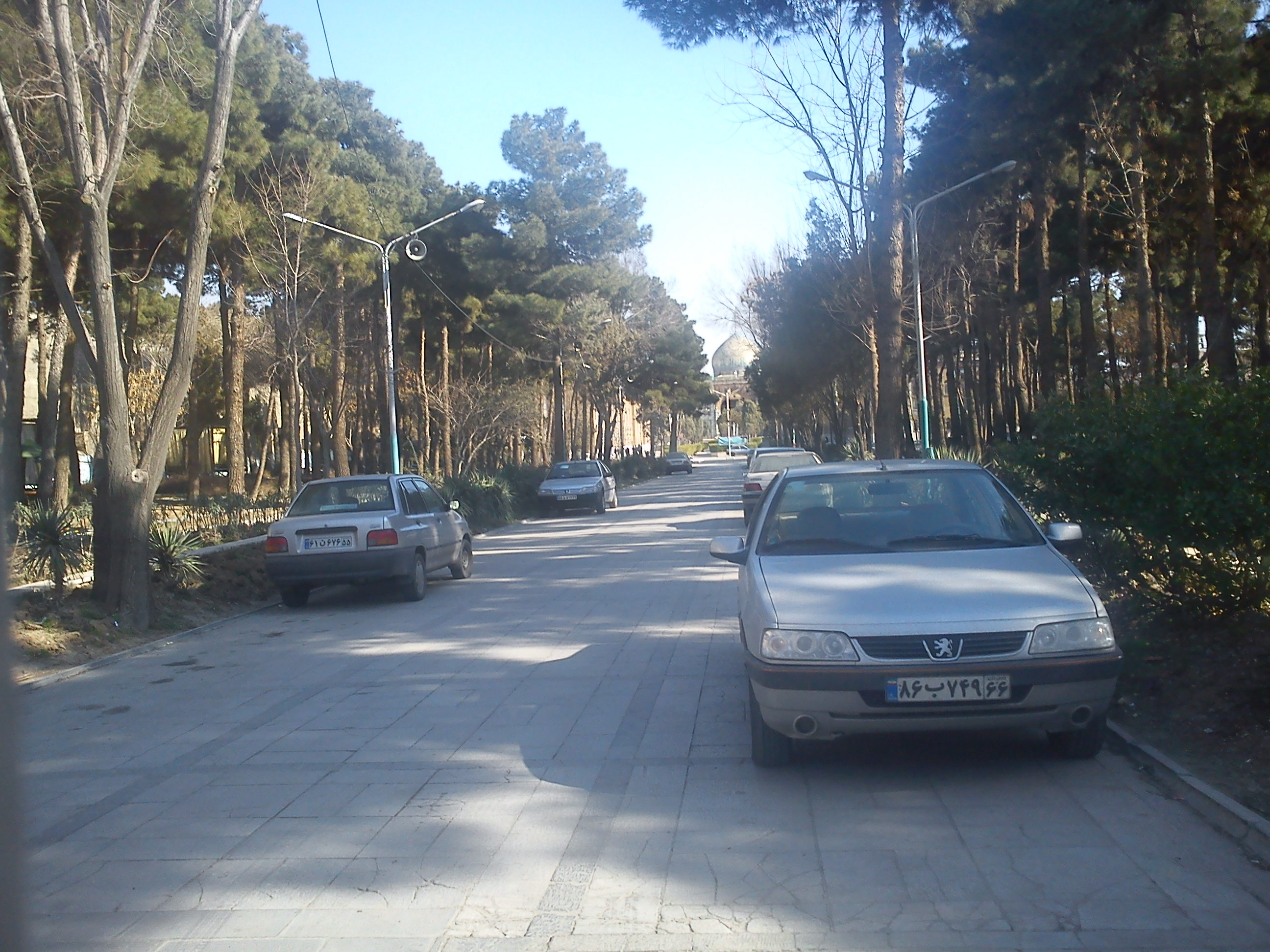
Site of the former mausoleum, in 2010

It was commonly believed that when the revolutionaries opened Reza Shah's sarcophagus, they found nothing because Mohammad Reza Shah had his father's body moved elsewhere, and probably the body of the penultimate Shah of Iran is now also at the Al-Rifa'i Mosque with the remains of his son.

In their biography of Mohammad Reza Shah, Houchang Nahavandi and Yves Bomati say that the body of Reza Shah was actually moved before the revolution, but in a secret place still today, known by few people. Shortly before his death on 27 July 1980 (36 years and 1 day after his father), Mohammad Reza Shah told a small circle of intimates a location in Iran where, if his remains were to come back someday, he would like to be buried with soldiers and officers tortured by the revolutionaries; the authors imply that this place could be the same as that where the body of Reza Shah is hidden.

But in the documentary of 2015 From Tehran to Cairo, centered on the exile of the Shah in January 1979 to his death in July 1980, his widow, Shahbanu Farah, faces a moment to images of Khalkhali gloating amid ruins of the mausoleum, yet says this:

"The story goes that the government had time to recover the body of Reza Shah the Great to put it somewhere else, hidden ... but it is not; he is still buried there".

In 2018, construction workers in southern Tehran stumbled across a mummified body believed to be Reza Shah's. An official said that the body belonged to Reza Shah and was buried in the same area.

== Gallery ==
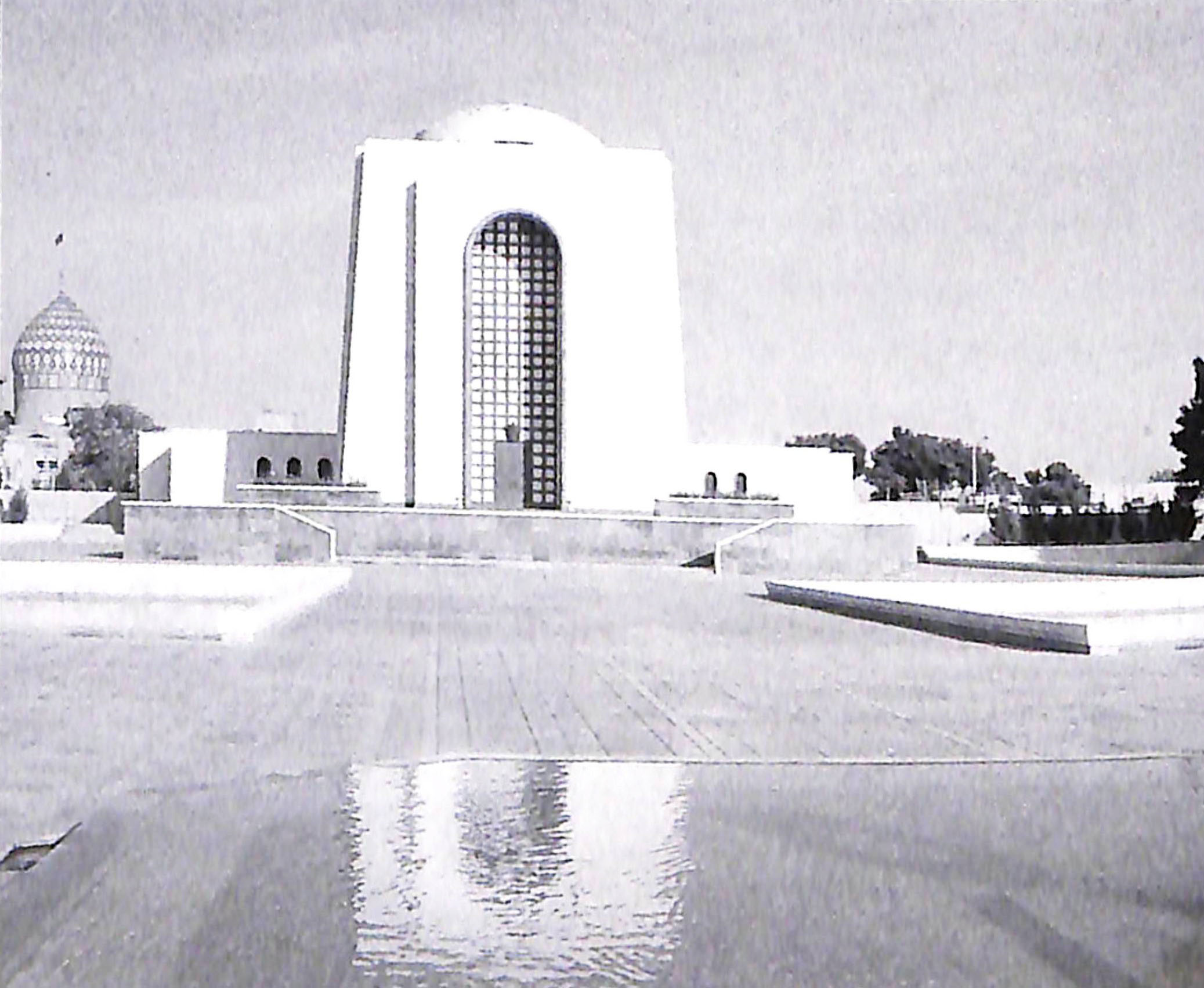
Under construction

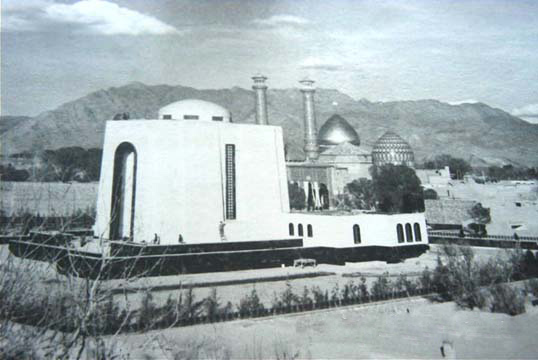
Under construction

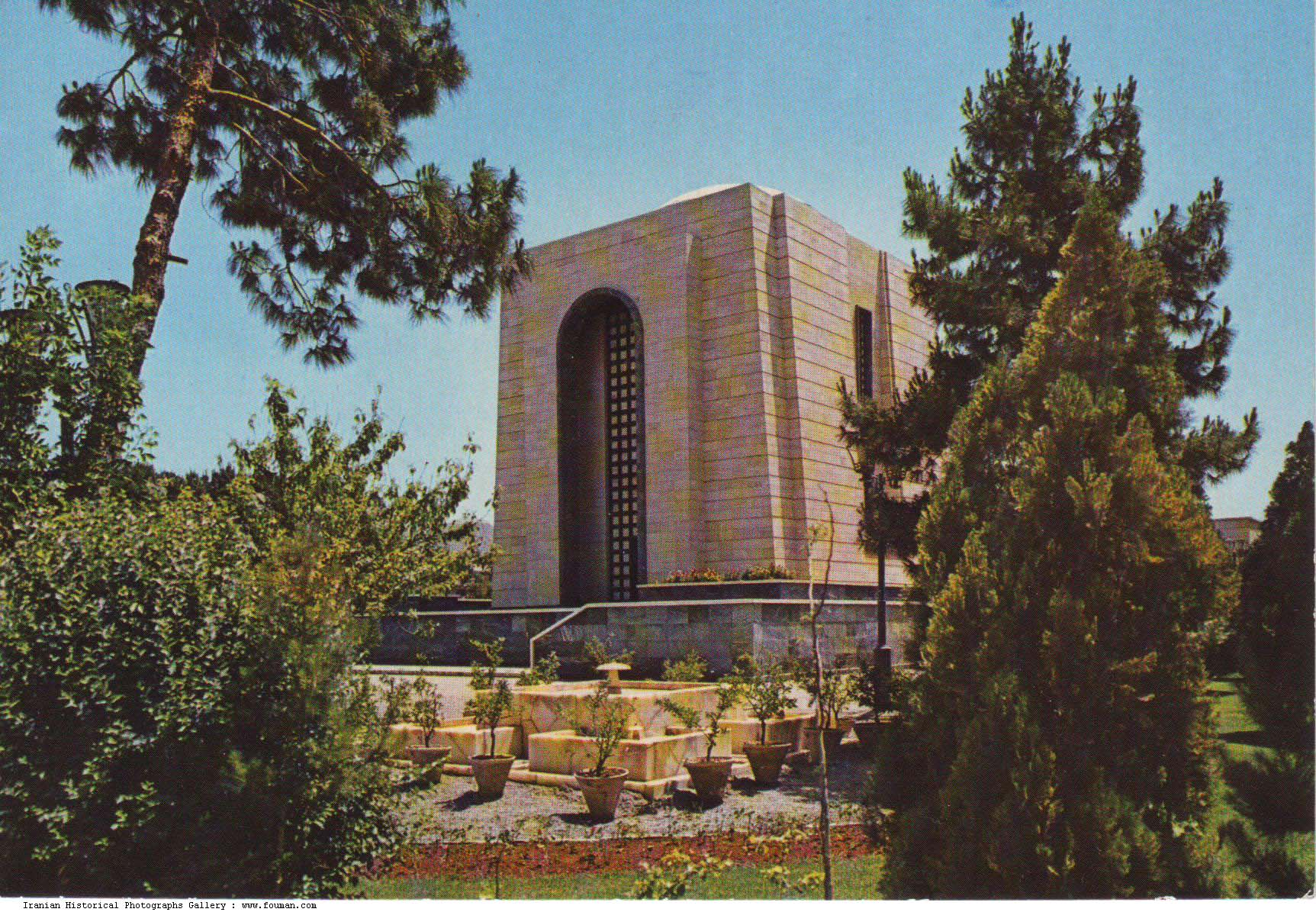
In the 1970s

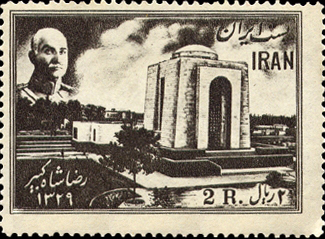
A stamp with the mausoleum's image, 1950

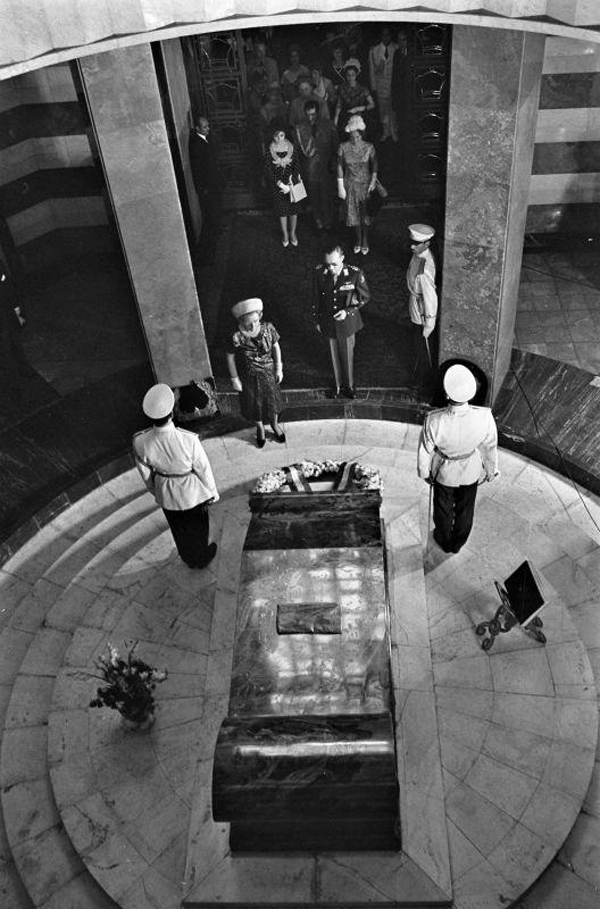
Juliana of the Netherlands visiting the mausoleum

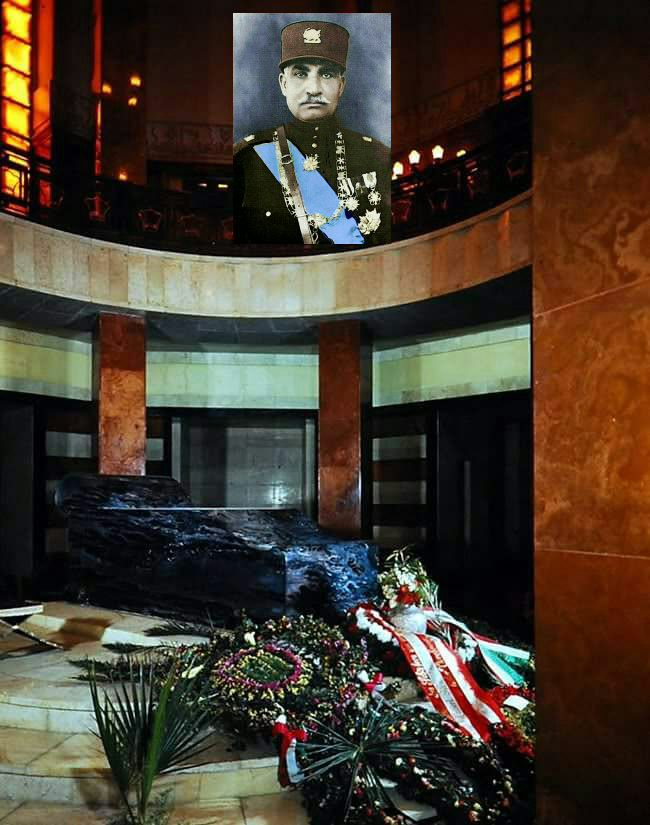
Reza Shah's 100th birthday celebrations at the mausoleum, 1978

== See also ==
- Sadegh Khalkhali
- Al-Rifa'i Mosque (Mohammad Reza Pahlavi's burial place)
- Persian domes
