= Ayrums =

Oghuz Turkic tribe

Ayrum
- Tamgha of Ayrums

Regions with significant populations
- Azerbaijan, Iran, Turkey, Georgia

Religion
- Shia Islam

Related ethnic groups
- Oghuz Turks

Ayrums (Azerbaijani: Ayrımlar, Persian: آیروملو, romanized: Âyromlū) are a Turkic tribe, sometimes considered to be a sub-ethnic group of Azerbaijanis after the nineteenth and twentieth centuries. They have been historically associated with the area nearby the city of Gyumri (in present-day Armenia).

== History ==
In 1828, after the signing of the Treaty of Turkmenchay by which Iran lost the khanates (provinces) of Erivan and Nakhchivan, Iranian Crown Prince Abbas Mirza invited many of the Turkic tribes that would be otherwise subjected to rule by the Russian Empire to move inside Iran's newly established borders. The Ayrumlu were one of them and were settled in Avajiq, a district to the west of Maku. They are associated with numerous villages in Iran's West Azerbaijan province and are completely sedentary in contemporary times.

During the late 19th and the early 20th centuries, some more migrated to Iran and Turkey. The Ayrums also live in the westernmost reaches of the present-day Republic of Azerbaijan, where they live as a semi-nomadic people. About six towns in northwestern Azerbaijan and northeastern Armenia may have been named after the tribe, while for some, alternative etymologies exist: Ayrum, Mets Ayrum, Bağanis Ayrum, Quşçu Ayrım, Yuxarı Ayrım, Mollaayrım. They predominantly follow the Shia branch of Islam.

There is no relation between Ayrums and the Greek Orthodox Turkic-speaking Urum people. The confusion is rooted in the lack of the Turkic sound "-ı" in Persian and its consequent representation by "-u". The name Ayrum has various spellings in the English language, such as Eyrum, Eirom and Airom.

== Notable Ayrums ==
- Teymur Khan Ayromlou, General in the Persian Army, father-in-law of Reza Pahlavi
- Tadj ol-Molouk Ayromlou, Queen Consort of Iran, wife of Reza Pahlavi, mother of Mohammad Reza Pahlavi
- Mohammad-Hosayn Ayrom, General in the Persian Cossack Brigade
- Mahmoud Khan Ayrom, General in the Persian Cossack Brigade
- Yusuf Ziya Ayrımlı, Senator of the Republic of Turkey (Kars, June 7, 1964 – October 14, 1979) in the TBMM
- Şamil Ayrım, Member of the Grand National Assembly of Turkey

== See also ==
- Ketabcha-ye tayefa-ye Ayromlu
- Turkic peoples
- Battle of Ganja (1804)
