= Order of the Supreme Sun =

Order of the Supreme Sun (Nishan-i-Lmar-i-Ala)
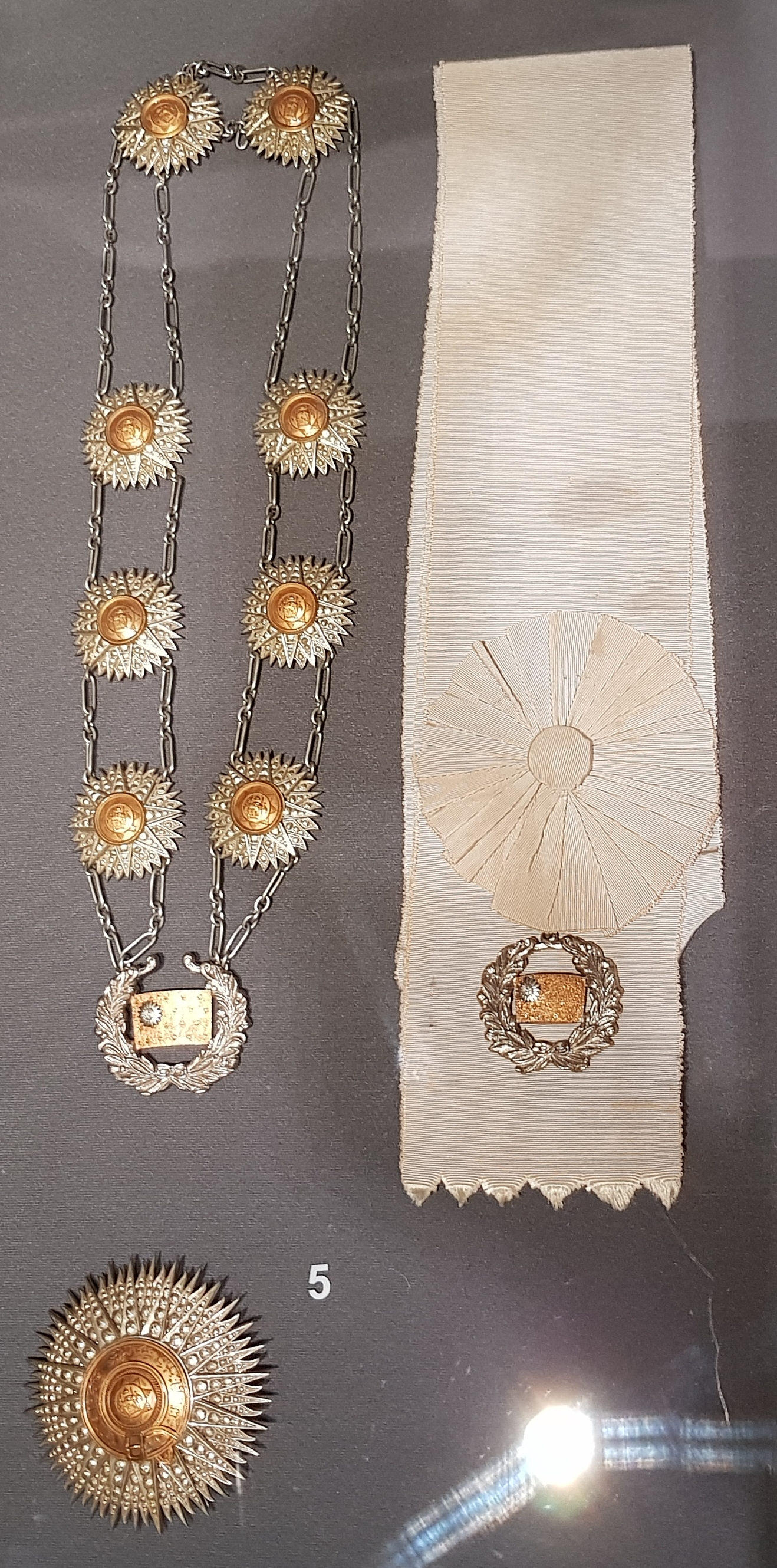

Awarded by King of Afghanistan
- Type: Order
- Established: 1920
- Awarded for: Services to the state of Afghanistan
- Status: discontinued
- Founder: Amanullah Khan
- Grades: Collar; 1st Class; 2nd Class; 3rd Class; Medal of Merit

Precedence
- Next (higher): None
- Next (lower): Order of the Leader
- / Ribbons of the order

The Order of the Supreme Sun (Nishan-i-Lmar-i-Ala) was a decoration of the former Kingdom of Afghanistan.

The Order was instituted in 1920 by King Amanullah Khan and discontinued in 1973 upon the abolition of the Afghan monarchy. It was awarded for services to the state and had four grades (Collar, 1st, 2nd and 3rd Classes) and a Medal of Merit.

The Order's ribbon was blue with a central red stripe (until 1960). After 1960 the Order's ribbon was sky blue with two red lateral stripes.

== Recipients ==
- Akihito, The Emperor Emeritus of Japan
- Humaira Begum
- Soraya Tarzi
- Sukarno
- Queen Elizabeth The Queen Mother
- Ludvík Svoboda
- Farouk of Egypt
- Fuad I of Egypt
- George VI
- Iskander Mirza
- Józef Piłsudski
- Mohammad Reza Pahlavi
- Abdul Reza Pahlavi
- Ali Reza Pahlavi
- Prince Philip, Duke of Edinburgh
- Tribhuvan of Nepal
