= Mahmud Khan Puladeen =

Iranian senior military leader (d. 1928)

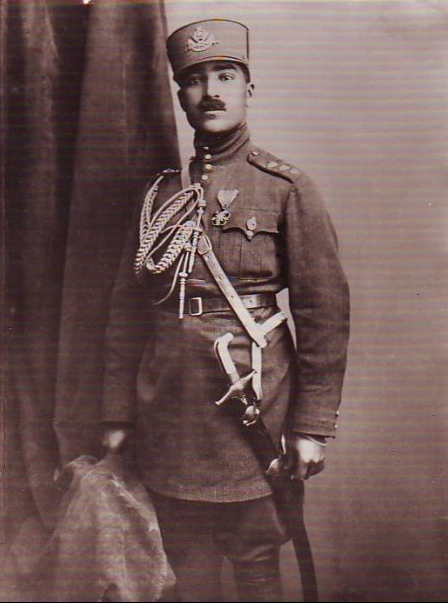
Mahmud Khan Pulādeen

Major General Mahmud Khan Pulādeen (Persian: محمود خان پولادین; d. February 1928[1]] born in Naxçıvan, South of Caucasus) also spelled as Pouladin or Pouladeen, was a senior military leader during the reign of Reza Shah Pahlavi.

Mahmoud Khan came from a military family. His father Hassan Khan was an officer in Cossack Brigade. His father was a Caucasian migrant. Mahmud Khan Pouladin had four brothers: Mansour, Masoud, Ahmad, Mokhtar. All of them followed their father in to military. One of his younger brothers, Mokhtar Pouladin, was also a military officer and died on heart attack at age of 50. He survived by his wife Shafigheh Darab and their four children Shokoufeh, Banafsheh (08.02.1947-07.10.2026), Kourosh and Bahar.

In 1921, he served as personal guard to Zia ol Din Tabatabaee. He was sent to various parts of Iran where tribal clashes were threatening stability.

Soon after Reza Shah ascended to the throne, Puladeen was arrested on charges of conspiring to overthrow Reza Shah, along with Samuel Jem, a Jewish member of parliament.

The court sentenced him to 10 years in prison, but Reza Shah insisted on a death sentence. Major General Sarteep Sheibani, a friend of Puladeen, refused to carry out the death sentence and resigned from his post.

Finally, in 1928, he was executed in Bagh-Shah, Tehran, by firing squad. He survived the firing squad's 21 bullets, but Major General Karim Buzarjomehri went up to the wounded Puladeen and shot him in the head, finishing the execution.

== See also ==
- Amir Abdollah Tahmasebi
- Mohammad Hosein Airom
- Abdolhossein Teymourtash
- Sar Lashgar Buzarjomehri
- Colonel Pessian
- Bahram Aryana
