= Alasht =

City in Mazandaran province, Iran

Alasht Persian: آلاشت
- City
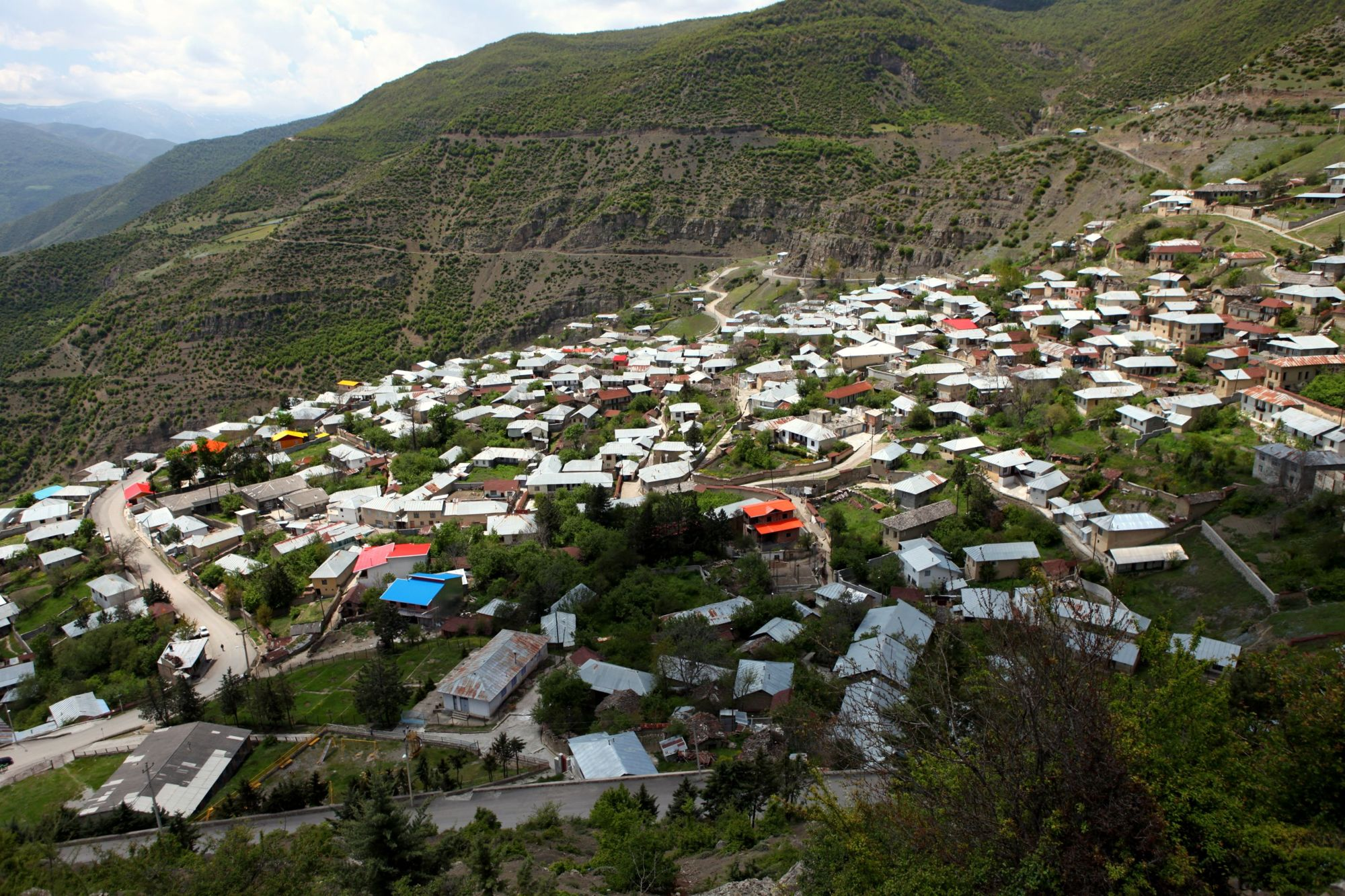
- A view of Alasht

- Location within Iran
- Coordinates: 36°04′01″N 52°50′16″E
- Country: Iran
- Province: Mazandaran
- County: Savadkuh
- District: Central

Population (2016)
  - Total: 1,193
- Time zone: UTC+3:30 (IRST)

Alasht (Persian: آلاشت) (Note: Also romanized as Ālāsht and Âlaŝt (English translation: Eagle Sanctuary)) is a city in the Central District of Savadkuh County, Mazandaran province, Iran.

== Demographics ==
=== Population ===
At the time of the 2006 National Census, the city's population was 976 in 287 households. The following census in 2011 counted 874 people in 279 households. The 2016 census measured the population of the city as 1,193 people in 436 households.

== Geography ==
=== Location ===
Alasht is isolated by surrounding mountains, giving it a cooler climate than most regions of the province.

=== Natural resources ===
Alasht has a natural spring and is also noted for being one of the few cryotherapy spots in the province.

In addition, caves in and around Alasht are rich with minerals, mostly anthracite coal reserves.

=== Climate ===
Due to its location, Alasht is fairly cool throughout the year. Winter in the village is particularly harsh, causing most of the inhabitants to move to warmer areas for the season. However, the rainfall in the village is similar to the rest of the province, with approximately 593 millimeters of precipitation per year.

== Notable people ==
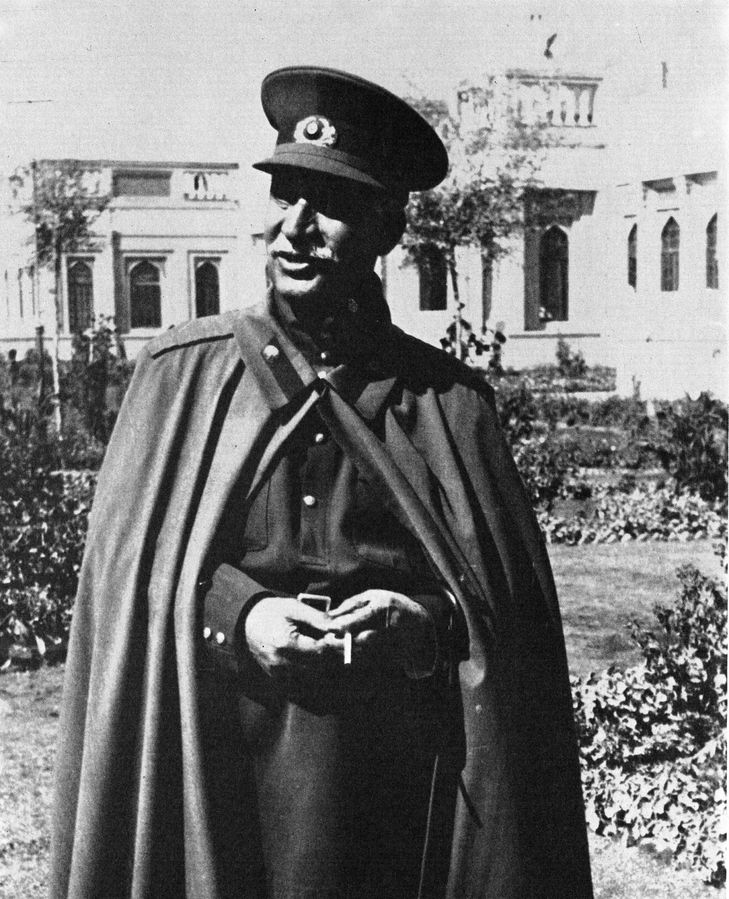
Reza Shah Pahlavi

Alasht is the birthplace of Reza Shah Pahlavi, the founder of the Pahlavi dynasty.

== Gallery ==
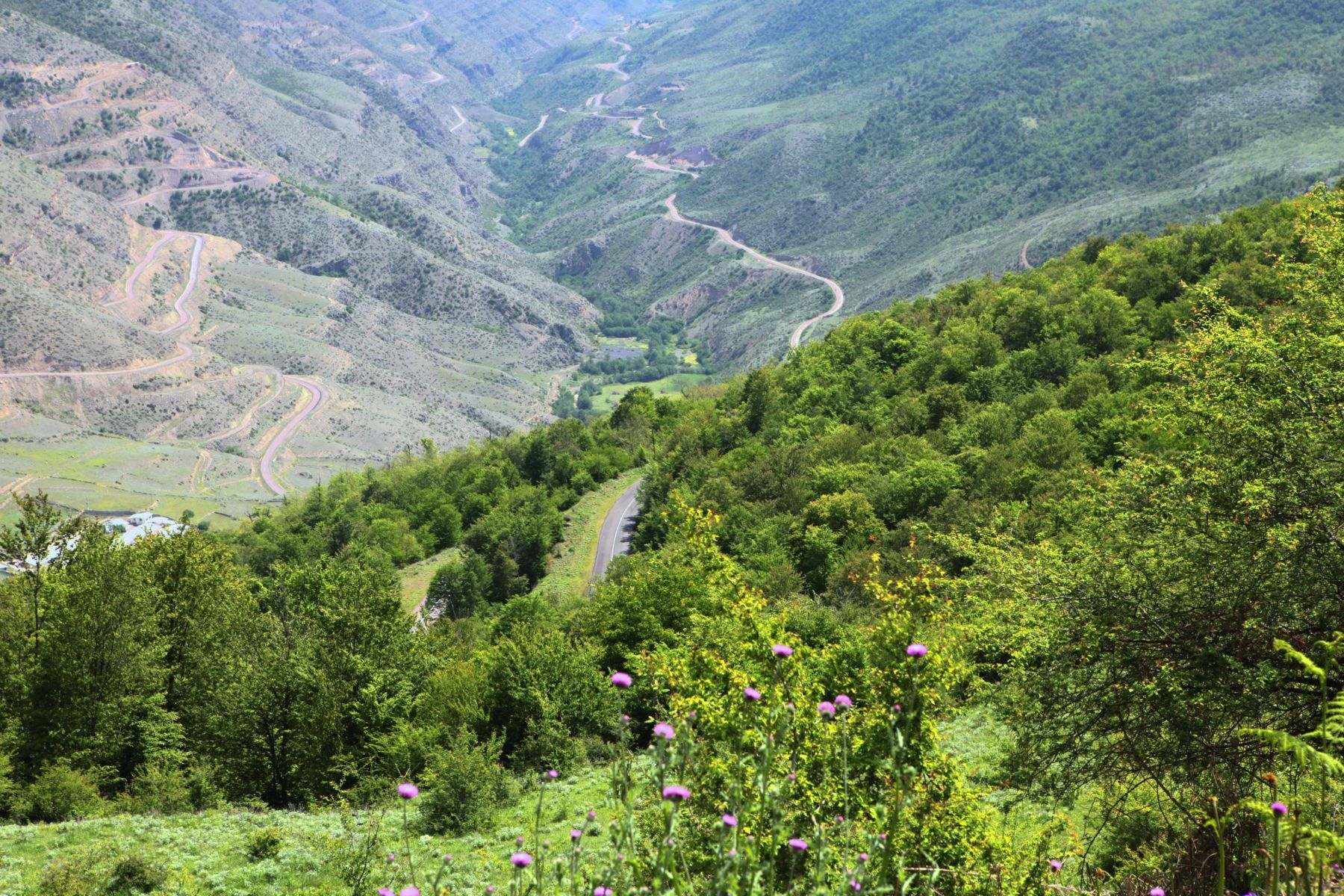
A view of Alasht road

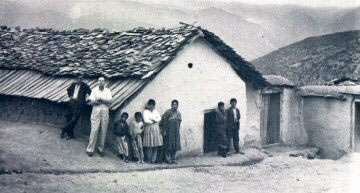
The birthplace of Reza Shah

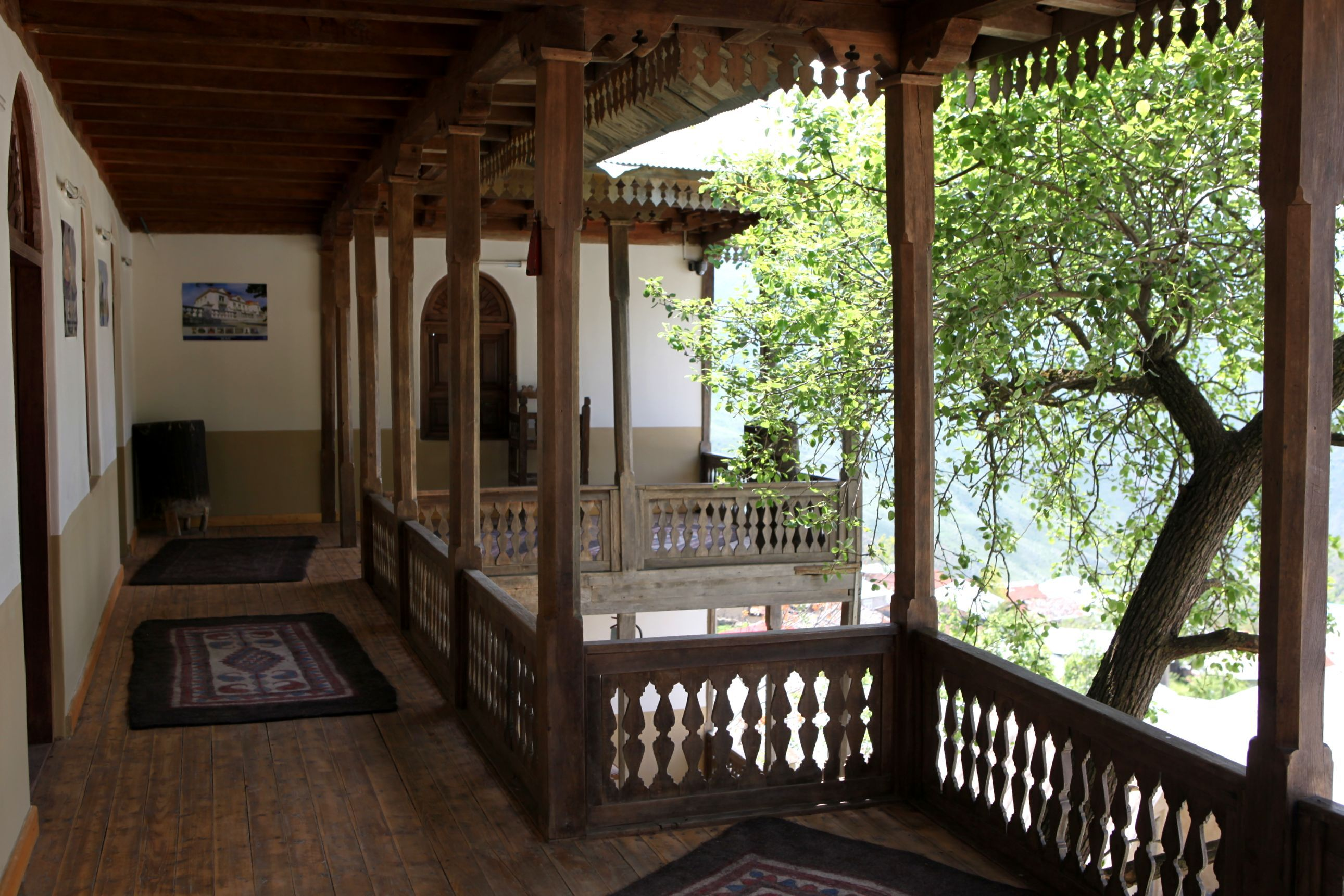
The birthplace of Reza Shah

== See also ==
Media related to Alasht at Wikimedia Commons
