= Ali Reza Pahlavi (born 1922) =

Iranian prince and brother of Mohammad Reza Pahlavi

Prince Ali Reza Pahlavi
- Prince of Iran
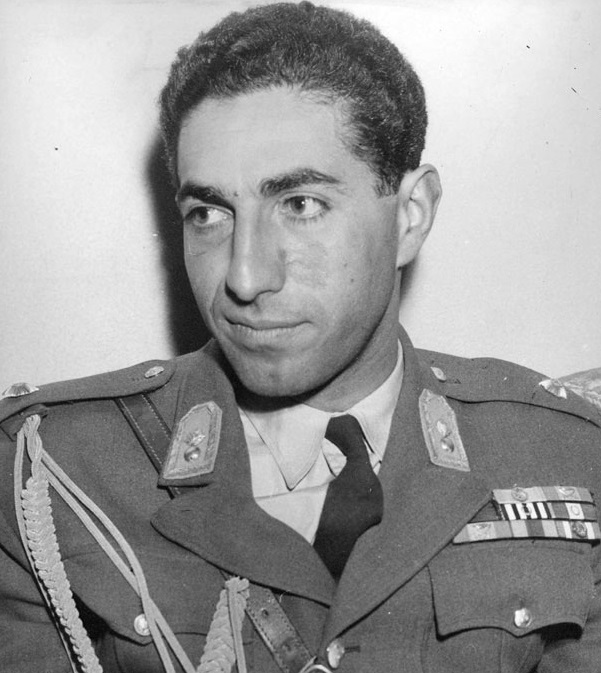
- Prince Ali Reza Pahlavi
- Born: 1 March 1922; Tehran, Persia
- Died: 17 October 1954 (aged 32); Alborz mountains, Iran
- Spouse: Christiane Cholewski
- Issue: Patrick Ali Pahlavi
- House: Pahlavi dynasty
- Father: Reza Shah
- Mother: Tadj ol-Molouk
- Religion: Shia Islam
- Military career
- Service years: 1941–1954
- Rank: Colonel
- Awards: Order of the Crown (1st Class)

Ali Reza Pahlavi (علیرضا پهلوی; 1 March 1922 – 17 October 1954) was the second son of Shahanshah Reza Pahlavi and Tadj ol-Molouk. He was the younger brother of the last Shah of Iran, Mohammad Reza Pahlavi.

== Biography ==
Ali Reza Pahlavi was the second son and youngest child of Reza Shah and Tadj ol-Molouk, and the full brother of Mohammad Reza Pahlavi. Born in 1922, he joined the French Army in 1944 and served until 1947. During his stay in France, he married Christiane Cholewski, a woman of Polish descent, and they had a son, Ali Patrick Pahlavi.

However, the Iranian court never officially recognized this union, so Ali Reza's wife and son lived in Paris. On 17 October 1954, Ali Reza Pahlavi died in a plane crash. His death sparked many rumors, as it occurred at a time when his potential appointment as heir to the throne was being discussed, since Shah Mohammad Reza and his wife, Soraya Esfandiary-Bakhtiari, had no children.

After Ali Reza's death, his son, Ali (Patrick), was brought to Iran and placed under the care of the court. Nevertheless, Patrick spent his entire life believing that his uncle, Shah Mohammad Reza, was responsible for his father's death.

== Education ==
Reza Shah intended a military career for his son and enrolled him in a military school, where Ali Reza completed the first four years of his primary education. On 3 September 1931, he was sent to Switzerland to continue his studies. He studied in Lausanne for five years and returned to Iran on 9 May 1936.

Upon his return, Ali Reza attended a military high school until 1939, after which he continued his education at a military academy. In 1941, he completed his course and received his officer's diploma at a graduation ceremony attended by his father, Reza Shah. This was the final graduating class of the academy before the Allied occupation of Iran.

== Marriage ==
During World War II, a significant number of Polish refugees, mostly women and children, were brought to Iran by the Allies. Most of them were settled outside Tehran, south of the Qazvin Gate, and some on the grounds of the power plant at Jaleh Square (now Shahid Square).

Soraya Esfandiary-Bakhtiari recalled in her memoirs, The Palace of Solitude:

Ali Reza, even before returning to Iran, married a Polish widow named Christiane Cholewski in Paris, and they had a son named Ali Patrick. Naturally, he returned to Iran without his wife and son.

—

The Pahlavi family strongly opposed this marriage. Ali Reza's mother, Tadj ol-Molouk, and his sister, Ashraf Pahlavi, were particularly vocal in their opposition. Nevertheless, despite family pressure, Ali Reza married the Polish refugee.

== Personality and Character ==
In appearance and character, Ali Reza closely resembled his father, Reza Shah. Unlike Mohammad Reza Pahlavi, who was physically more delicate, Ali Reza possessed a robust build and excellent physical fitness; at birth, he reportedly weighed as much as his two older brothers combined. He was known for his high self-confidence, bravery, and near-total absence of fear. Military service attracted him from a young age, and upon returning to Iran, he enrolled in a military school by his own initiative to become an army officer. Ali Reza was tall, with a serious expression, and viewed Reza Shah not just as a father, but as a role model.

Ali Reza avoided social events, including private parties; if his presence was mandatory, he would often leave after a few minutes. Like his brother Mohammad Reza, he frequently complained of poor health, and both brothers exhibited signs of psychological tension. Ali Reza was extremely reclusive and spent much of his time in the mountains, dedicated to hunting.

In his post-revolutionary memoirs, General Hossein Fardoust recalled:

Another person the British were betting on was Ali Reza. At that time, he was about nineteen, and in character and personality, he was very similar to Reza Khan. Ali Reza was distinguished by his harshness and lack of flexibility. The British knew his qualities well and understood that his personality was unlikely to change, so they preferred Mohammad Reza over Ali Reza.

—

Ali Reza did not know how to hide his thoughts and feelings, which some suggest may have been a contributing factor to his eventual death.

== Succession Question and Political Role ==
In her memoirs, Tadj ol-Molouk wrote:

Ali Reza held his older brother in the highest esteem and always deferred to him. I can testify that there were no disagreements between Mohammad Reza and Ali Reza. In those years, Mohammad Reza was looking for a way to abdicate the throne, take his wife by the hand, and leave the country. It was Ali Reza who urged him to stay and show resilience. From 1951, when the monarchy was threatened several times and we saw Mohammad Reza exhibiting fatigue and helplessness in the face of mounting pressure from opposition politicians, we suggested to Ali Reza that he become Mohammad Reza's successor. However, Ali Reza categorically refused. It reached the point where the British ambassador suggested that Ali Reza prepare to succeed his brother, but Ali Reza responded sharply to the ambassador, insisting that his brother must remain on the throne.

—

It is believed that the British government considered the possibility of replacing Mohammad Reza with his younger brother, Ali Reza.

Journalist Eskandar Deldem noted that influential figures at court, including Ashraf Pahlavi, viewed Ali Reza as possessing the leadership qualities necessary to save the monarchy from decline. The British government, dissatisfied with the Shah's perceived weakness during the era of Mohammad Mosaddegh, allegedly considered Ali Reza a viable alternative. These circumstances fueled widespread rumors that Ali Reza was positioning himself to displace his brother. When he died in 1954, public opinion was heavily shaped by the belief that he had fallen victim to political rivalry with the Shah.

The question of Ali Reza's succession was raised twice: first during Reza Shah's exile, as a means of British pressure on Mohammad Reza, and again during the Mosaddegh era when the Shah's departure from Iran was debated. While no documents prove Ali Reza took active steps to seize power, he reportedly expressed dissatisfaction with the Shah's governance in private. Journalist Riahi noted that while Ali Reza remained loyal, he viewed his brother as insufficiently prepared for rule and occasionally complained that the Shah refused to grant him any official duties or positions.

== Role in the 1953 Coup d'état ==
During the movement for the nationalization of the Iranian oil industry, Ali Reza Pahlavi advocated for decisive measures against the nationalists, contrasting with the more hesitant approach of his brother, Mohammad Reza. He organized a headquarters consisting of both active and retired military officers, as well as several government officials. The primary objective of this group was to oppose the national movement and overthrow the government of Mohammad Mosaddegh.

Actions attributed to this headquarters include involvement in the assassination of General Mahmoud Afshartous, the chief of police, and the organized theft of munitions from the military academy's arsenal. According to reports, between 200,000 and 300,000 rounds of ammunition were transferred to the Bakhtiari tribe.

The activities of this group culminated in the 1953 Iranian coup d'état. With the assistance of General Fazlollah Zahedi and the support of armored army units, Mosaddegh's government was overthrown, leading to the return of Mohammad Reza Pahlavi to Iran.

== Death and Theories ==
The death of Ali Reza Pahlavi in a plane crash remains shrouded in mystery. Some authors, including the writer of My Memoirs with Farah Pahlavi, suggest his death was a consequence of rivalry with the Shah, explicitly accusing Mohammad Reza of orchestrating his brother's assassination.

Soraya Esfandiary-Bakhtiari partially refutes this version, noting that Ali Reza loved the Shah and did not wish to join his opponents; however, she confirms that he was dissatisfied with the Shah's treatment of him and complained that he was treated the same as his half-brothers. Ashraf Pahlavi, in an interview with the German magazine Quick, denied the Shah's involvement but acknowledged that while the Shah loved his brother, he naturally wanted the throne to pass to his own son.

The most comprehensive information regarding the plane crash is contained in the three-volume book "My Memoirs with Farah Pahlavi". The author, a former prominent journalist with access to court circles, provides details of the political rivalry between Ali Reza and the Shah and describes an alleged conspiracy organized by Ali Reza against the Shah, supporting his claims with documents and testimonies. He also attributes to Ali Reza involvement in the assassination of Prime Minister Ali Razmara and considers his role in the events leading up to the 1953 coup to be pivotal.

It is believed that the Shah, fearing the potential appointment of Ali Reza as heir or his influence among military commanders, played a decisive role in his brother's death, and his agents arranged the sabotage that led to the plane crash. According to Fardoust, the Pahlavi family considered the Shah guilty, while Mohammad Reza himself always maintained silence on the matter.

Soraya Esfandiari-Bakhtiari wrote in her memoirs:

Despite the pilot's warning about unfavorable weather conditions, Ali Reza personally took the controls of the plane to arrive on time for the birthday of his brother, whom he held in high esteem. He was also transporting one of his farmers, who was suffering from pneumonia, to the hospital. He was not deterred by the bad weather the pilot warned about and set off on the flight.

—

After this tragedy, Mohammad Reza, apparently experiencing a sense of guilt, tried to avoid everything that would remind him of his deceased brother and did not allow others to mention him.

Farideh Diba, the mother of Farah Pahlavi, noted in her memoirs the Shah's alienation toward his nephew—Ali Reza's son:

Another member of the Pahlavi family whom we were forbidden to receive at family gatherings and in the palaces was the son of the late Shahzadeh Ali Reza.

—

== Burial and Aftermath ==
It was officially reported that Ali Reza's body was buried in the crypt of the Reza Shah Mausoleum in Ray. However, following the Iranian Revolution, when Ayatollah Sadegh Khalkhali demolished the mausoleum, journalists discovered that the grave marked for Ali Reza Pahlavi was empty. This led to conclusions that the imperial court's official announcement regarding his burial location was false

Rumors suggest that shortly before the revolution, Mohammad Reza Pahlavi removed the remains of both his father and Ali Reza and took them abroad. According to some reports, the remains were temporarily kept in Los Angeles, USA. It is currently believed that they are interred in Cairo, Egypt, at the same location where Reza Shah's coffin had been temporarily kept decades earlier.

== Honours ==
=== National honours ===
- (Iran) Knight Grand Cordon of the Order of Pahlavi
- (Iran) Order of Military Merit, First Class (1937)
- (Iran) Order of Military Merit, Second Class (1937)
- (Iran) Order of Glory, First Class (1937)

=== Foreign honours ===
- (Jordan) Knight Grand Cordon of the Supreme Order of the Renaissance (28 February 1949)
- (Afghanistan) Member First Class of the Order of the Supreme Sun

== Bibliography ==
- Rahnema, Ali (2014). Behind the 1953 Coup in Iran: Thugs, Turncoats, Soldiers, and Spooks. Cambridge University Press. ISBN 978-1-107-07606-8.
- Brezinski, Claude; Tournès, Dominique (2014). André-Louis Cholesky: Mathematician, Topographer and Army Officer. Springer. ISBN 978-3-319-08135-9.
- Dareini, Ali Akbar (1999). The Rise and Fall of the Pahlavi Dynasty: Memoirs of Former General Hussein Fardust. Delhi: Motilal Banarsidass. p. 123. ISBN 978-81-208-1642-8.
- Aqeli, Baqer (2008). Chronology of Iran's History from Constitutionalism to the Islamic Revolution (in Persian). Vol. 2. Tehran: Namek. p. 23. ISBN 964-6895-53-0.
- Pirani, Ahmad (2003). Baradaran-e Shah (The Shah’s Brothers) (in Persian). Tehran: Be Afarin. p. 392. ISBN 9789646760370.
- Deldam, Eskandar (2005). Khaterat-e Man va Farah Pahlavi (My Memoirs with Farah Pahlavi) (in Persian). Vol. 2. Tehran: Be Afarin. p. 526. ISBN 9789649164960.
- Maki, Hossein (1987). Tarikh-e Bist Saleh-ye Iran (Twenty-Year History of Iran) (in Persian). Vol. 8. Tehran: Elmi. p. 560.
- Esfandiari Bakhtiari, Soraya (1991). Le Palais des Solitudes (The Palace of Solitude) (in Persian). Tehran: Peykan. p. 344. ISBN 9789643281670.
- Farideh Diba (2001). Dokhtaram Farah (My Daughter Farah) (in Persian). Tehran: Be Afarin. p. 508. ISBN 9789646760158.
- Al-Mouti, Mostafa (1990). Iran in the Pahlavi Era (in Persian). Vol. 2. London: Pahlavi Foundation. p. 471.
- Riyahi, Manouchehr (2005). Sarab-e Zendegi: Gusheh-haye Maktoomi az Tarikh-e Mo’aser (Mirrors of Life: Hidden Aspects of Contemporary History, Memoirs of Manouchehr Riyahi) (in Persian). Vol. 2. Tehran: Tehran Publishing. p. 872. ISBN 9789649457154.
- Andermani-Zadeh, Jalal (1999). Pahlavi-ha: Khandan-e Pahlavi be Revayat-e Asnad: Farzandan-e Reza Shah (The Pahlavis: The Pahlavi Family through Documents: Children of Reza Shah) (in Persian). Vol. 2. Tehran: Nazar Cultural-Research Institute of Printing and Publishing. p. 648. ISBN 9789646357150.
- Amuzegar, Jahangir (1991). Dynamics of the Iranian Revolution: The Pahlavis' Triumph and Tragedy. State University of New York Press. p. 368. ISBN 978-0791407325.
- Fardoust, Hossein (2010). Zohur va Soghut-e Saltanat-e Pahlavi: Khatirat-e Arteshbod-e Sabeg (The Rise and Fall of the Pahlavi Dynasty: Memoirs of Former General Hossein Fardoust) (in Persian). Vol. 1. Tehran: Ettela’at Publications. p. 708. ISBN 9789644232183.
- Taj al-Molouk Pahlavi (2001). Khatirat-e Malakeh Pahlavi Taj al-Molouk Ayermloo (Memoirs of Queen Taj al-Molouk Pahlavi) (in Persian). Tehran: Be Afarin. p. 462. ISBN 9789646760332.
- Cockcroft, James D. (1989). Mohammed Reza Pahlavi, Shah of Iran. New York; Philadelphia, PA: Chelsea House Publishers. p. 79. ISBN 978-1555468477.
- Montgomery-Massingberd, Hugh (1980). Burke's Royal Families of the World. Vol. 2. London: Burke's Peerage. p. 149. ISBN 0-85011-029-7.
