= Ketabcha-ye tayefa-ye Ayromlu =

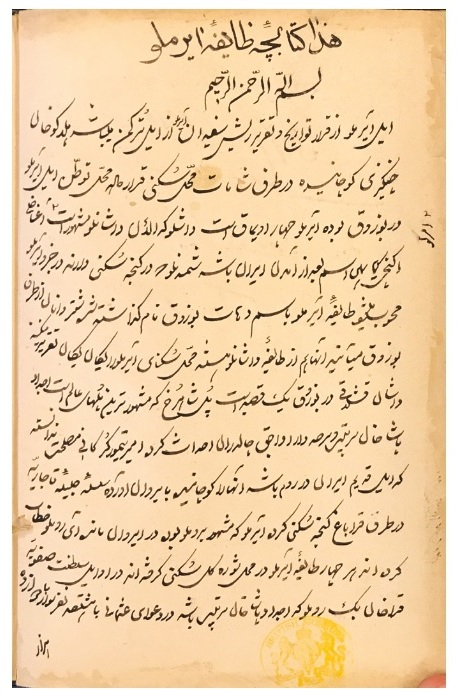
First folio of the Ketābcha-ye tāyefa-ye Āyromlu, MS. British Library Or. 5428

Ketabcha-ye tayefa-ye Ayromlu (Persian: کتابچه طایفه آیرملو; lit. The Booklet of the Ayromlu Tribe) is an 1886 short Persian-language chronicle recounting the history of the Turkic Āyromlu (Ayrumlu) tribe. Authored by Mohammad ibn Bahram Khan Āyromlu in northwestern Iran, it is a ten-folio manuscript housed in the British Library (Or. 5428). The chronicle serves as an appeal for economic redress, highlighting the Āyromlu tribe's grievances over unpaid salaries and neglected land rights. While primarily focused on the Qajar period, the manuscript also draws on historical chronicles and oral traditions, including correspondence between tribe leader Pasha Khan and Qajar officials, reflecting ongoing efforts to resolve these issues. The manuscript is plain and unadorned, written in a formal Persian register, and contains numerous spelling errors, suggesting parts were written in haste.

== Sources ==
- Hobhouse, Caspar; Karamustafa, Ali Aydin (2024). "A People of the Frontier: An Account of the Āyromlu Tribe between the Qajar, Ottoman, and Russian Empires". Journal of Persianate Studies. 16 (2): 139–176. doi:10.1163/18747167-bja10042.
- Oberling, Pierre (1987). "Āyrīmlū". In Yarshater, Ehsan (ed.). Encyclopædia Iranica. Vol. III/2: Awāʾel al-maqālāt–Azerbaijan IV. London and New York: Routledge & Kegan Paul. pp. 151–152. ISBN 978-0-71009-114-7.
