= Patrick Ali Pahlavi =

Iranian royal (born 1947)

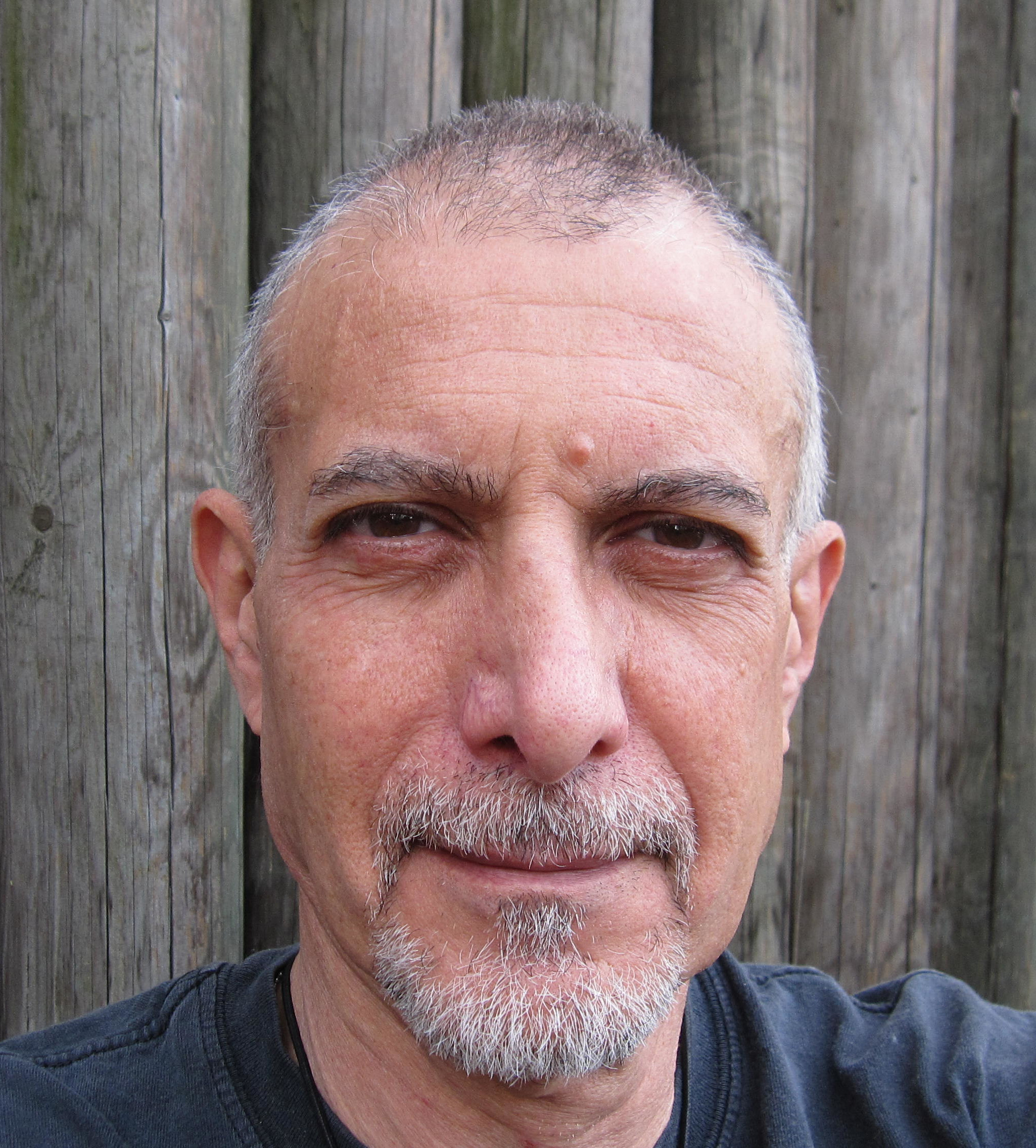
- Pahlavi in 2010
- Born: 1 September 1947 (age 78); Paris, France
- Spouse: Sonja Lauman
- Issue: Davoud Pahlavi; Houd Pahlavi; Mohammad Younes Pahlavi
- Dynasty: Pahlavi
- Father: Ali Reza Pahlavi
- Mother: Christiane Cholewski

Patrick Ali Pahlavi (Persian: پاتریک علی پهلوی; born 1 September 1947) is the disputed (Note: The Persian Constitution of 1906 specifically provided that only a male could become the heir, with the current candidate being Patrick Ali Pahlavi. However, Pahlavi has declared his eldest daughter, Noor Pahlavi, as his heir.) heir presumptive to the headship of the deposed Pahlavi dynasty since 2011, succeeding his cousin Ali Reza Pahlavi. According to the former constitution of Iran, Patrick was the first in the line of succession to the throne from 1954 to 1960. However, with the birth of Reza Pahlavi in 1960, the latter became the heir apparent. Pahlavi's position as heir presumptive has been challenged by his cousin Reza Pahlavi, who has declared his eldest daughter, Noor Pahlavi, as his heir.

== Early life ==
Born in Paris, Patrick Ali Pahlavi is a son of Prince Ali Reza Pahlavi and his wife Christiane Cholewski (or Choleski), a French woman of Polish descent (although there is no record of his parents' 20 November 1946 wedding in the 16th arrondissement of Paris, France). His father chose for him an Irish name popular in France, 'Patrick', and his mother chose for him a Muslim name, 'Ali', which made 'Patrick Ali' his full given name. On his birth he was baptized.

As his father was the second son of Reza Shah, founder of the roughly 53 years old Pahlavi dynasty and Shah of Iran, Patrick Ali is a nephew of Mohammad Reza Pahlavi, the last Shah. His father was the heir presumptive to his sonless brother's throne and following his death in a plane crash in 1954, Patrick Ali Pahlavi succeeded him as heir presumptive.

In February 1955, Prince Patrick Ali was at the centre of a dispute between his mother and his uncle, Mohammad Reza Pahlavi the Shah. As heir to the throne, his uncle wanted him enrolled at the Maria Jose School in Switzerland to receive a "proper court education" while his mother wanted to take him to Paris so he would be closer to her. Because of the dispute, he was placed in "protective custody" with policemen guarding his suite at the Hotel Excelsior in Italy until his mother gave into the Shah's demands and he was enrolled at the school. In March, Patrick's mother took him from his school without the Iranian embassy or the Swiss authorities knowing.

In 1960, with the birth of a son for his uncle, Patrick lost his place as first in the line of succession to the Iranian throne.

When he returned to Iran in the beginning of the 1970s, he spoke out publicly about the corruption of the regime of his uncle the Shah. In 1975, he was arrested and jailed at Evin prison, where he faced daily interrogations and psychological torture, including a fake execution.

== Exile ==
Following the Iranian Revolution and overthrow of the Shah in early 1979, Patrick Ali was the only prince to remain in Iran. He writes, "There, the Clergy was divided about me. There was those who saw in me the danger of a return to the Pahlavi and those who saw in me a possible solution. Four times I was brought to Evin prison again and four times my partisans released me." He left for exile three days before he was due to go on trial where he might have faced a death sentence.

Patrick Ali studied and practiced a number of religions and spiritualities, including Taoism, Buddhism (Zen), Hinduism (Advaita), Judaism, Christianity and Islam over a forty-year period.

Patrick Ali was married in 1972 to Sonja Lauman; together they have three sons:

- Davoud Pahlavi (born 7 July 1972), married Lucilia Da Fonseca in 1998, they have two daughters:
  - Solvène Pahlavi
  - Elsa Pahlavi
- Houd Pahlavi (born 26 November 1973), has one son:
  - Rafaël Pahlavi (born 2006)
- Mohammad Pahlavi (born 19 May 1976)
