= Aşağı Ayrım =

- Location within Azerbaijan Location within East Zangezur Economic Region
- Coordinates: 40°07′43″N 46°01′56″E
- Country: Azerbaijan
- District: Kalbajar
- Elevation: 1,574 m (5,164 ft)
- Time zone: UTC+4 (AZT)

Ashaghi Ayrim (Azerbaijani: Aşağı Ayrım) is a ghost village in the Kalbajar District of Azerbaijan. It is situated in the mountains of the Lesser Caucasus at an altitude of 1574 m.

== Etymology ==
Ashaghi means 'lower' in Azerbaijani language and "Ayrım" is the name of a nearby river that tumbles through a steep, picturesque mountain valley. The name Ayrım is thought to signify the former presence of Ayrums in the vicinity.

== History ==
As part of Russia, the village of Ayrim was part of the Javanshir district of Elizavetpol province. According to the "Caucasian Calendar" of 1912, 84 people lived in the village of Ayrim, mostly Azerbaijanis, listed in the source as "Tatars".

During the First Karabakh War in 1993, the village was occupied by Armenian armed forces. After the occupation, the village was destroyed.

On 25 November 2020, based on the trilateral agreement between Azerbaijan, Armenia and Russia dated with 10 November 2020, concluded after the end of the Second Karabakh War, Kalbajar district was returned under the control of Azerbaijan.

The village was predominantly a summer shepherding settlement accessing a series of yaylaq pastures including Məşədi Cəmilin yurdu, Qazıxanlı yaylağı, Fərhadyanan yurd, Qaraqaya yurdu, Səfərdüşən yurd, Tozluq yurdu, Hasarlı yurd, Dərə damlarının yurdu, Hümbətalı yurdu, Çiçəklitəpə yurdu and Qumluarxac yurdu.
