= Mets Ayrum =

Mets Ayrum Մեծ Այրում
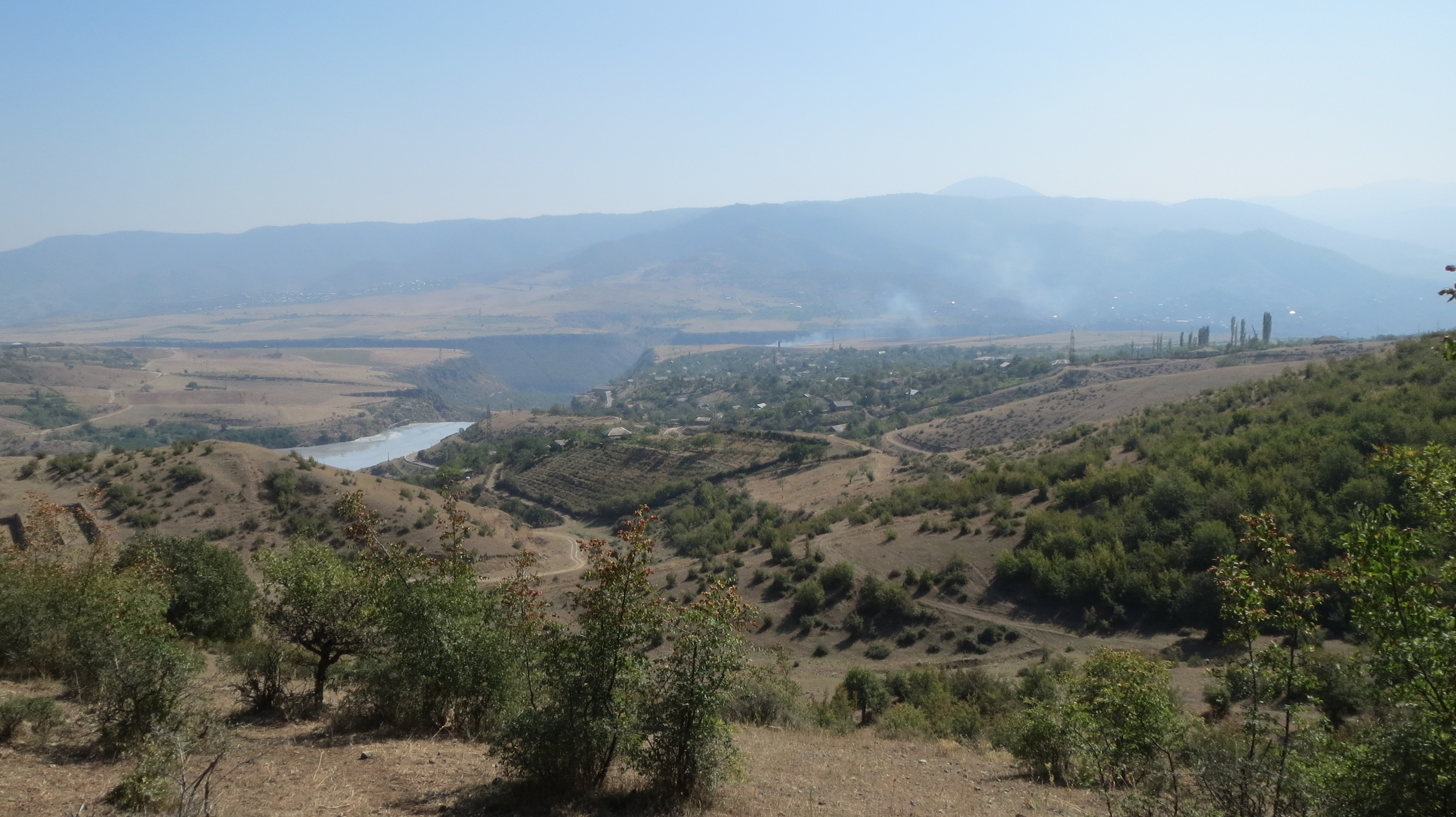
- Mets Ayrum in 2015

- Location within Armenia
- Coordinates: 41°10′18″N 44°49′09″E
- Country: Armenia
- Province: Lori
- Elevation: 690 m (2,260 ft)

Population (2011)
  - Total: 581
- Time zone: UTC+4 (AMT)

Mets Ayrum (Armenian: Մեծ Այրում) is a village in the Lori Province of Armenia.

== Development programs ==
In 2015 some programs started to be implemented in Mets Ayrum by Children of Armenia Fund. Arts Clubs, Crafts Clubs, Media Literacy Club, Student Councils, English Language Instruction, Social and Psychological Assistance, Support to Children with Learning Difficulties, Health and Lifestyle Education, Women Health Screenings, Support for Reproductive Health were implemented in the village by COAF. COAF SMART room was renovated in the village school.

== Gallery ==
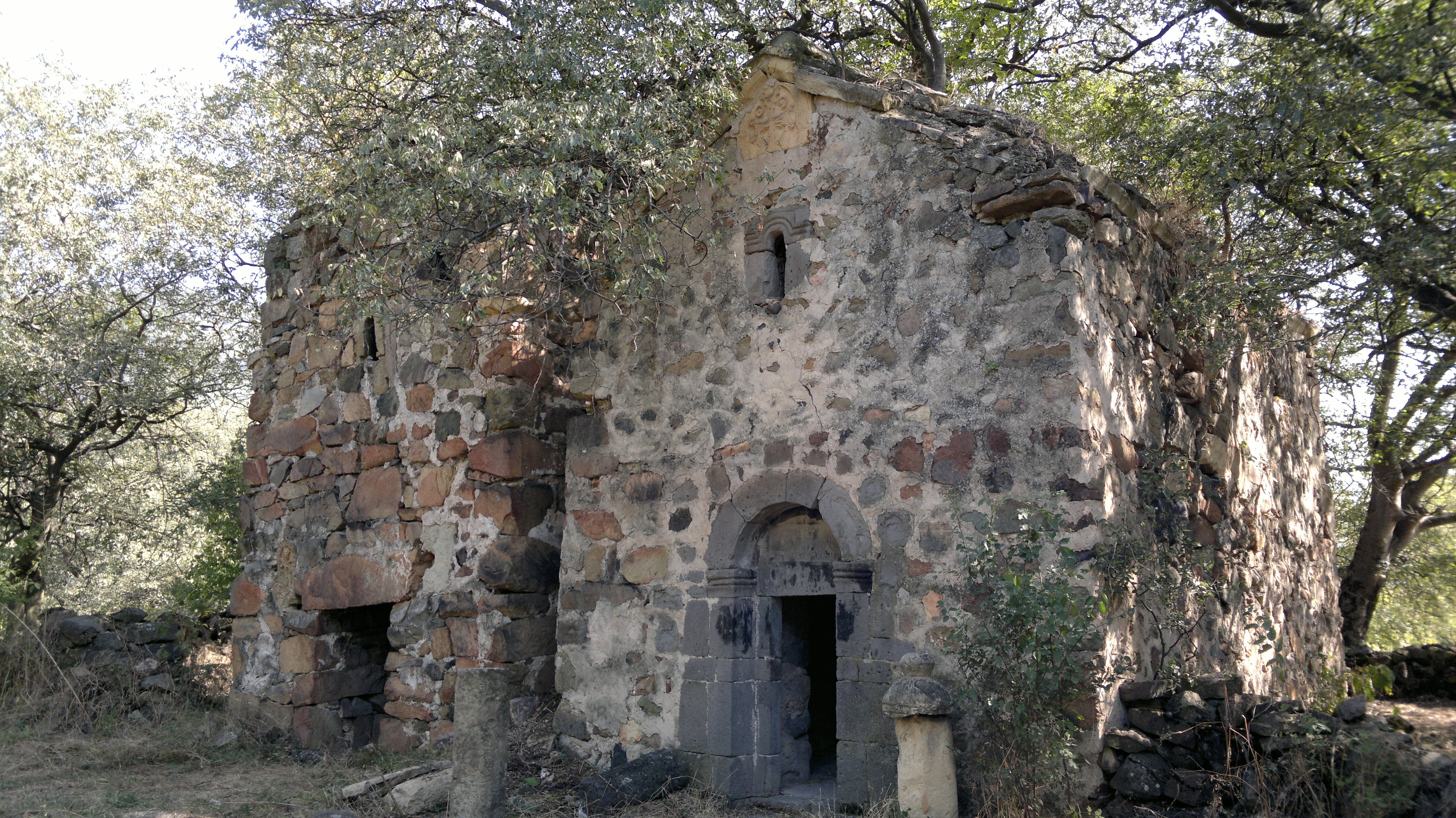
Nahatak Monastery

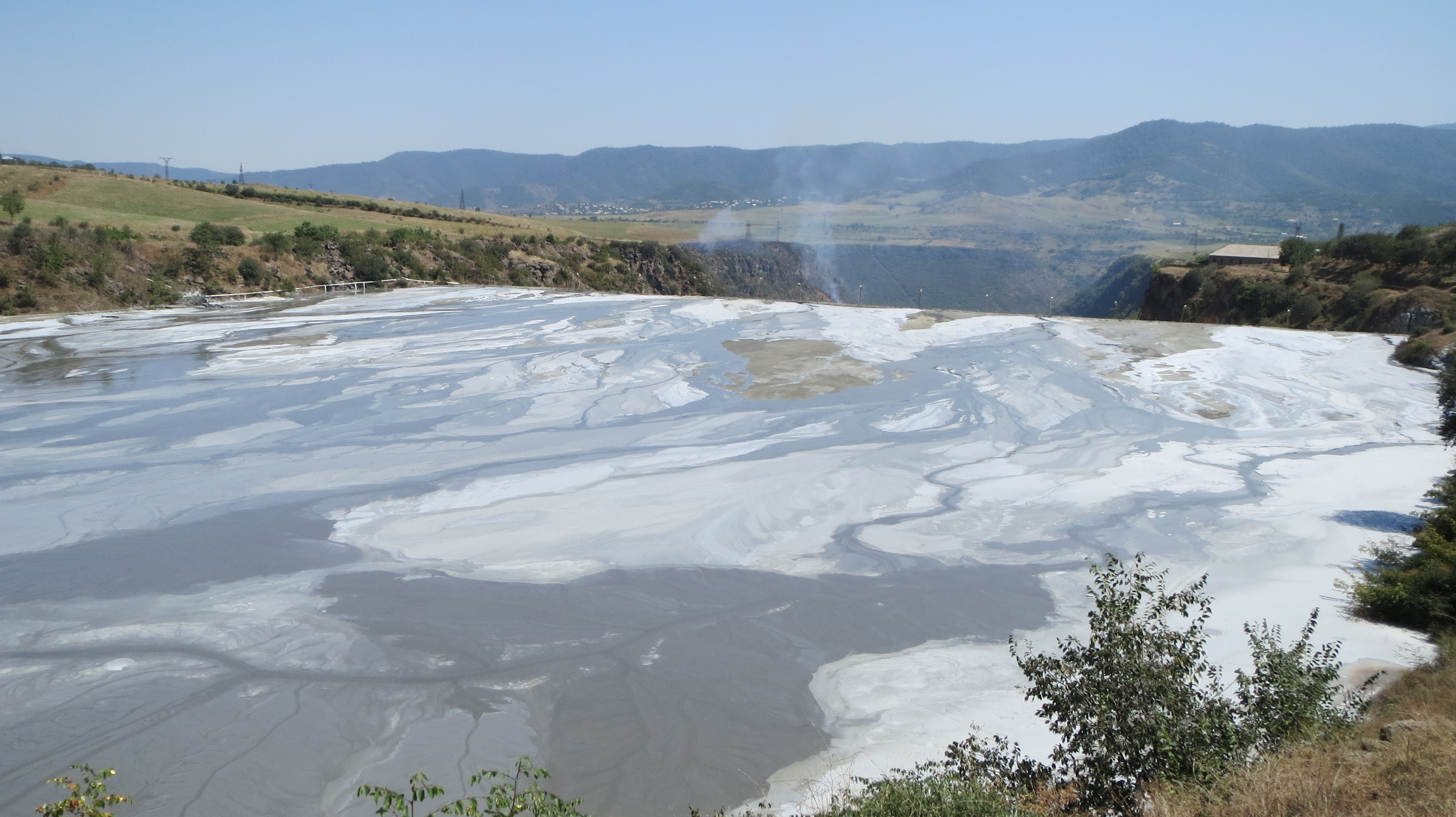

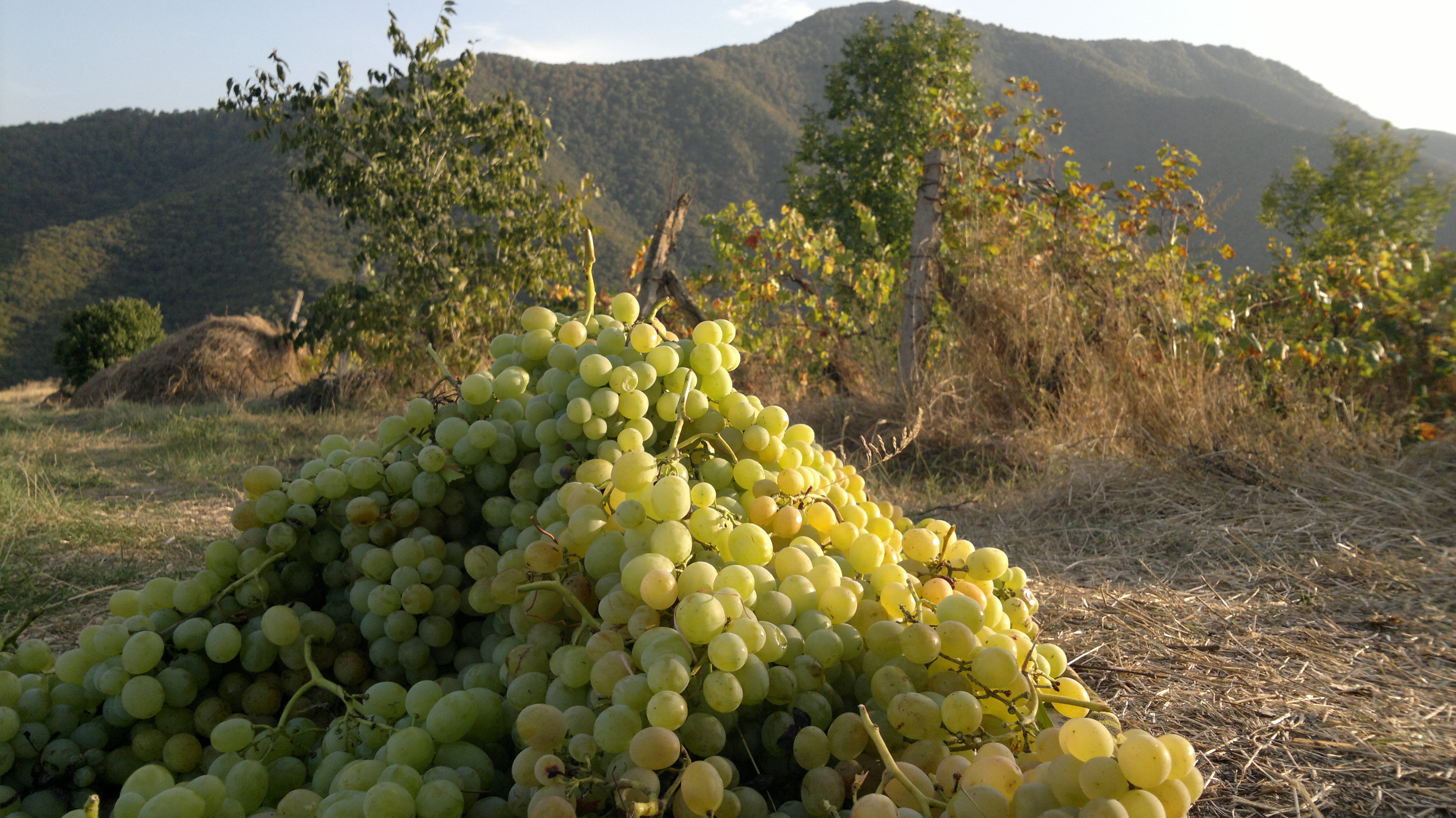

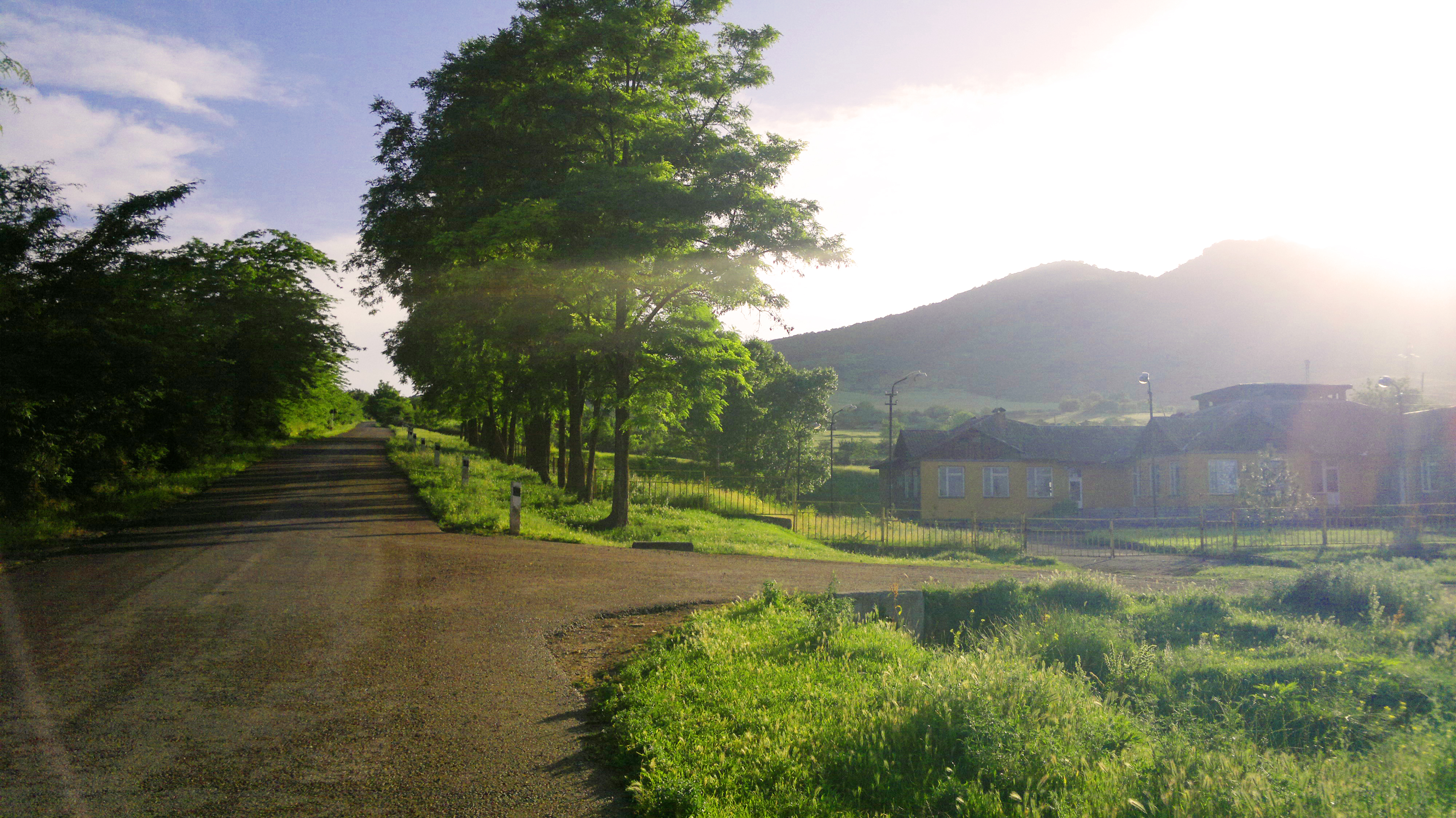
