= Tadj ol-Molouk =

Queen of Persia/Iran from 1925 to 1941

Tâdj ol-Molouk
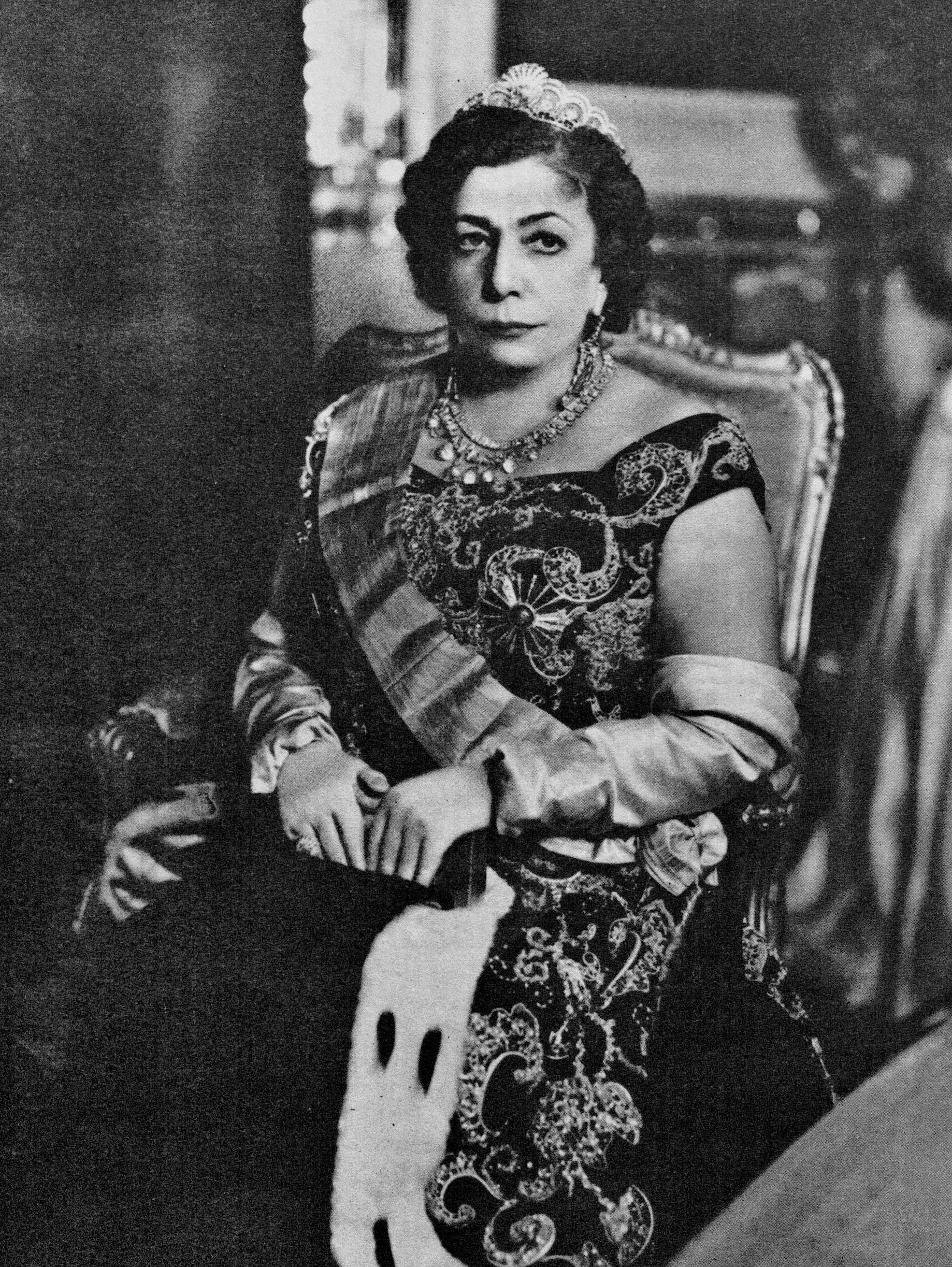
- Tadj ol-Molouk on Reza Shah's coronation day in 1926

Queen consort of Iran
- Tenure: 15 December 1925 – 16 September 1941
- Born: Nimtaj Ayromlou; 17 March 1896; Baku, Russian Empire (now in Azerbaijan)
- Died: 10 March 1982 (aged 85); Acapulco, Mexico
- Spouse: Reza Shah (m. 1916; died 1944) Gholamhossein Saheb Divani (m. 1945; div. 1950)
- Issue: Princess Shams; Mohammad Reza Shah; Princess Ashraf; Prince Ali Reza
- House: Pahlavi (by marriage)
- Father: Teymūr Khan Ayromlou
- Mother: Malek os-Soltan

Tâdj ol-Molouk (Persian: تاج‌الملوک; 17 March 1896 – 10 March 1982) was the Queen of Iran and second wife of Reza Shah, the founder of the Pahlavi dynasty and Shah of Iran from 1925 to 1941. The title she was given after becoming queen means "Crown of the Kings" in the Persian language. She was the first queen in Iran after the Muslim conquest in the seventh century to have participated in public royal representation, and she played a major role in the kashf-e hijab (ban of the veil) in 1936.

== Biography ==
She was the daughter of Brigadier General Teymūr Khan Ayromlou, of the Turkic Ayrum tribe, and his wife Malek os-Soltan.

Her marriage with Reza Khan took place in 1916. It was arranged and proved an advantage in the military career of Reza Khan at the time, due to the connections of her father, enabling him to advance in the Cossack hierarchy. Together, they had four children: Shams, Mohammad Reza, the last Shah of Iran, and his twin sister Ashraf, and Ali Reza.

On 23 February 1921, Reza Khan took power in a coup in Tehran.

=== Queen ===
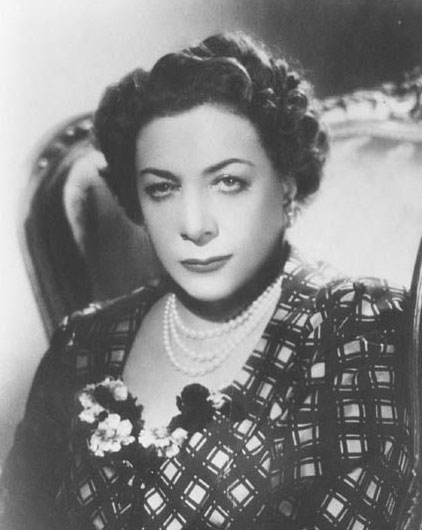
Queen Tadj ol-Molouk in 1937

On 15 December 1925, her spouse declared himself Shahanshah (King of Kings), and she was granted the title Malekeh (Queen).

Privately, Tadj ol-Molouk did not live with Reza Shah at this point, as he reportedly devoted his time to his other wives, Turan Amirsoleimani, and, from 1923, Esmat Dowlatshahi. Neither did she involve herself in politics on her own initiative. However, it was she who was given the position of Queen during his reign, which signified an important role in his policy on women. She was the first Queen of Iran to have played a public role, and to have performed an official position out in public society.

Her role as a queen participating in public representational duties had great importance within the new policy of women's role in Iran, as it was the policy of her husband to increase women's participation in society as a method of modernization, in accordance with the example of Turkey.

In 1928, the queen attended the Fatima Masumeh Shrine during her pilgrimage in Qom wearing a veil which did not cover her completely and showed her face, for which she was harshly criticised by a cleric. In response, Reza Shah publicly beat the cleric who had criticised the queen the next day. The reform to allow female teachers and students not to veil, as well as allowing female students to study alongside men, were all reforms opposed and criticised by the Shia clergy.

During the reign of her husband she played an important role in the abolition of the veil in Iran: the Kashf-e hijab. The unveiling of women had a huge symbolic importance to achieve women's participation in society, and the shah introduced the reform gradually so as not to cause unrest: while women teachers were encouraged to unveil in 1933 and schoolgirls and female students in 1935, the official declaration of unveiling were made on 8 January 1936, and the queen and her daughters were given an important role in this event. That day, Reza Shah attended the graduation ceremony of the Tehran Teacher's College with the queen and their two daughters unveiled and dressed in modern clothes, without veils. The queen handed out diplomas, while the shah spoke about half the population being disregarded, and told women that the future was now in their hands. This was the first time an Iranian queen showed herself in public. Afterwards, the Shah had pictures of his wife and daughters published, and unveiling enforced throughout Iran.

Tadj ol-Molouk continued to participate in public representation in this fashion when obliged to by her husband and thus played an indirect role in his policy, but she never made any initiatives of her own and stayed out of political involvement. In 1939, she attended the wedding of her son Mohammad Reza Pahlavi to Fawzia of Egypt. The relationship to Fawzia was not, however, described as a good one.

=== Later life ===
On 16 September 1941, Reza Shah was deposed and exiled. She did not follow him to his exile in Mauritius, and later South Africa, instead choosing to remain at the court of her son in Iran. A year after Reza Shah's death, she married Gholamhossein Saheb Divani, the son of a prominent family from Shiraz who was her junior. He was later elected to the National Consultative Assembly.

She held significant influence over her son and reportedly dominated the royal household. The conflict between Tadj ol-Molouk and her daughter-in-law Queen Fawzia attracted attention at the time, and reportedly participated in the factors which lead to the departure of Fawzia to Egypt and the dissolution of the royal marriage in 1948. She was acknowledged to have had a deeply devoted relationship to Princess Shahnaz.

In 1950, Tadj ol-Molouk participated in arranging the marriage between her son the Shah and Soraya Esfandiary-Bakhtiary. She left Iran with most of the royal household during the premiership of Mohammad Mosaddegh when the latter asked the Shah to expel them from Iran. They returned to Iran after the fall of Mossadegh in 1953.

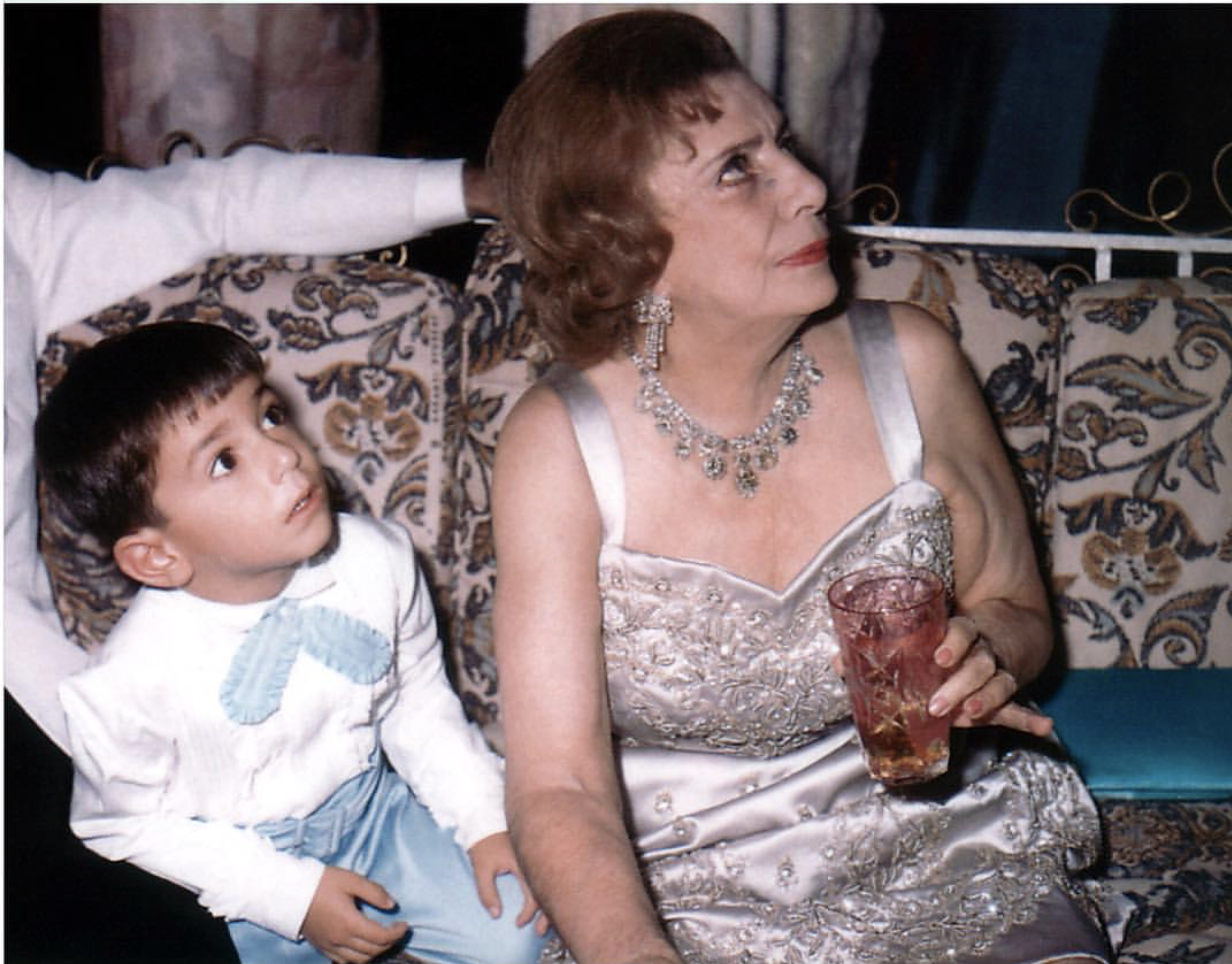
Tadj ol-Molouk with her grandson Crown Prince Reza in 1965

During her son's reign, Tadj ol-Molouk did not normally participate in royal representation, in contrast to her daughters and daughter-in-law, nor did she participate much in charity. She did not fully attend the coronation of the shah on 26 October 1967, attending only the reception following it rather than the coronation itself. She did arrange two receptions in her palace annually: one to celebrate the birthday of her eldest grandson, and one to celebrate the fall of Mossadegh. When the health of the shah was beginning to deteriorate in 1971, this was not admitted, and the official reason for physicians to visit the palace was for the sake of the elderly Tadj ol-Molouk.

Before the 1979 Iranian Revolution, Tadj ol-Molouk was sent by Mohammad Reza Shah to Princess Shams Pahlavi's house in Beverly Hills. She arrived in Los Angeles on 30 December 1978 aboard an Imperial Iranian Air Force Boeing 747. Soon after her arrival, on 2 January 1979, Iranian students in the city attacked the house and attempted to burn it. Then she and her daughter took refuge at the Sunnylands estate in Palm Springs owned by Walter Annenberg, former US ambassador to the United Kingdom.

She died in Acapulco, Mexico, on 10 March 1982, seven days before her 86th birthday.

== Honours ==
=== National ===
- House of Pahlavi: Knight Grand Cordon of the Order of the Light of the Aryans
- House of Pahlavi: Dame Grand Cordon of the Order of the Pleiades, 1st Class
- House of Pahlavi: Former Grand Mistress Dame Grand Cordon of the Order of Aftab
- House of Pahlavi: Former Grand Mistress Dame Grand Cordon of the Order of the Pleiades, 1st Class
- House of Pahlavi: Recipient of the Emperor Reza Shah I Coronation Medal
- House of Pahlavi: Recipient of the Commemorative Medal of the 2,500 year Celebration of the Persian Empire
- House of Pahlavi: Recipient of the Emperor Reza Shah I Centennial Medal

=== Foreign ===
- (Kingdom of Egypt) Egypt, Egyptian Royal Family: Dame Grand Cross of the Order of the Virtues, Supreme Class

== See also ==
- List of Iranian women royalty

== Other sources ==
- Yves Bomati et Houchang Nahavandi: Mohammad Réza Pahlavi, le dernier shah - 1919–1980 . Editions Perrin, Paris, 2013. ISBN 978-2262035877

Iranian royalty
Preceded by Badr al-Molouk	Queen consort of Iran; 1925–1941	Succeeded by Fawzia of Egypt
