= Teymūr Khan Ayromlou =

Persian general

Brigadier General Teymūr Khan Ayromlou
- Relatives: Tâj ol-Moluk Âyromlu (daughter); Mohammad Reza Pahlavi (grandson); Mohammad-Hosayn Âyrom (nephew)
- Military career
- Allegiance: Qajar Iran
- Branch: Army

Teymūr Khan Ayromlou was a brigadier general in the Iranian Army during the Qajar era. He was married to Malek os-Soltan. Their daughter, Taj ol-Moluk Ayromlou, was married to Reza Shah, the first monarch of the Pahlavi dynasty, and their grandson, Mohammad Reza Pahlavi, became the last Shah of Iran.

== See also ==
- Tadj ol-Molouk
- Reza Shah
