= Mollaayrım =

- Municipality
- Location within Azerbaijan
- Coordinates: 40°50′N 45°39′E
- Country: Azerbaijan
- Rayon: Tovuz

Population
  - Total: 253
- Time zone: UTC+4 (AZT)
  - Summer (DST): UTC+5 (AZT)

Mollaayrım (also, Molla Ayrım and Mollaayrum) is a village and municipality in the Tovuz Rayon of Azerbaijan. It has a population of 253.
