= Yuxarı Ayrım =

- Location within Azerbaijan Location within East Zangezur Economic Region
- Coordinates: 40°08′48″N 46°00′14″E
- Country: Azerbaijan
- District: Kalbajar
- Time zone: UTC+4 (AZT)
  - Summer (DST): UTC+5 (AZT)

Yuxarı Ayrım (Yukhary Ayrym) is a ghost village in the Kalbajar District of Azerbaijan. The name reflects the former presence of Ayrums in the vicinity. The main core of the village crowned a knoll above the river Ayrim close to the tree line on a narrow, unpaved track leading up from Aşağı Ayrım. A video released in December 2020 shows the dilapidated state of the stone houses which remained uninhabited after the village's occupation by Armenian forces in 1993.
