= Pahlavi dynasty =

Iranian royal dynasty (1925–1979)

Pahlavi
- Royal house
- Arms of dominion of the Shahs, and therefore coat of arms, of Pahlavi Iran from 1932. The emblem of the dynasty is the mountain and sun in the blue circle in the middle.
- Country: Imperial State of Iran
- Origin: Mazandaran, Iran
- Founded: 15 December 1925; 100 years ago
- Founder: Reza Shah Pahlavi
- Current head: Reza Pahlavi
- Final ruler: Mohammad Reza Pahlavi
- Connected families: House of Qajar; House of Muhammad Ali (through Fawzia of Egypt)
- Traditions: Twelver Shia Islam; Iranian nationalism
- Motto: مرا داد فرمود و خود داور است; Marâ dâd farmud o xod dâvar ast (Justice He bids me do, as He will judge me)
- Estate: Niavaran Palace in the Niavaran Complex (most recently)
- Deposition: 11 February 1979; 47 years ago (Iranian Revolution)

The Pahlavi dynasty (Persian: خاندان پهلوی, romanized: Xândân-e Pahlavi) was an Iranian royal dynasty that was the last to rule Iran before the country's monarchy was overthrown in the Iranian Revolution in 1979. It was founded in 1925 by Reza Shah Pahlavi, born Reza Khan, a non-aristocratic Iranian soldier of Mazanderani origin, who took on the name of the Pahlavi scripts of the Middle Persian language from the Sasanian Empire of pre-Islamic Iran. The dynasty largely espoused a form of Iranian nationalism rooted in the pre-Islamic era (notably based on the Achaemenid Empire) during its time in power, especially under its last Shah Mohammad Reza Pahlavi.

The dynasty replaced the Qajar dynasty in 1925 following the 1921 coup d'état, which began on 14 January 1921 when 42-year-old soldier Reza Khan was promoted by British General Edmund Ironside to lead the British-run Persian Cossack Brigade. About a month later, under British direction, Reza Khan's 3,000–4,000 strong detachment of the Cossack Brigade reached Tehran. The rest of the country was taken by 1923, and by October 1925 the Majlis agreed to depose and formally exile Ahmad Shah Qajar. The Majlis declared Reza Pahlavi as the Shah of Iran on 12 December 1925, pursuant to the Persian Constitution of 1906. Initially, Pahlavi had planned to declare the country a republic, as his contemporary Mustafa Kemal Atatürk had done in Turkey, but he abandoned the idea in the face of British and clerical opposition.

The dynasty ruled Iran autocratically, with a more pluralistic period beginning in 1941 and ending in 1953, when Prime Minister Mohammed Mossadegh was overthrown in a coup d'état instigated by the United States and the United Kingdom. The Shah then consolidated an increasingly autocratic rule, culminating in a brief one party state period which ended shortly before the dynasty was overthrown by the Iranian Revolution of 1979.

== Family background ==
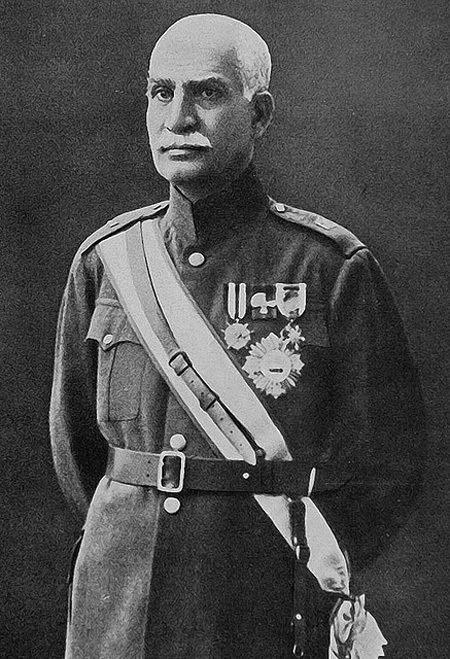
Reza Shah Pahlavi Founder of the Pahlavi Dynasty in 1940.

In 1878, Reza Khan was born at the village of Alasht in Savadkuh County, Mazandaran Province. His parents were Abbas Ali Khan and Noushafarin Ayromlou. His mother was a Muslim immigrant from Georgia (then part of the Russian Empire) whose family had emigrated to mainland Qajar Iran after Iran was forced to cede all of its territories in the Caucasus following the Russo-Persian Wars several decades prior to Reza's birth. His father was a Mazandarani, commissioned in the 7th Savadkuh Regiment, and served in the Anglo-Persian War in 1856.

== Pahlavi monarchs, regents, and heads of the house ==
– In pretence

Number	Picture	Name	Title	Family relations	Lifespan	Reigned from/Assumed title	Reigned until/Relinquished title	Reign duration (Note: Full years reigned)
I	Reza Shah	Shah; Reza Pahlavi	Shah	—	1878–1944 (aged 66)	15 December 1925	16 September 1941 (abdicated)	15 years
II	Mohammad Reza Shah	Shahanshah; Mohammad Reza Pahlavi	Shah (1941–1967); Shahanshah (1967–1979)	Son of Reza Pahlavi	1919–1980 (aged 60)	16 September 1941	11 February 1979 (deposed)	37 years
II	Mohammad Reza Shah	Shahanshah; Mohammad Reza Pahlavi	Shah (1941–1967); Shahanshah (1967–1979)	Son of Reza Pahlavi	1919–1980 (aged 60)	16 September 1941	27 July 1980 (died)	37 years
—		Shahbanu; Farah Pahlavi (née Diba)	Regent	Third wife and widow of Mohammad Reza Pahlavi	1938–current (age 88)	27 July 1980	31 October 1980 (regency expired)	—
III	Reza Pahlavi, Crown Prince of Iran	Crown Prince; Reza Pahlavi (Note: "Reza II" in pretense.)	Head of the House of Pahlavi	Son of Mohammad Reza Pahlavi and Farah Pahlavi	1960–current (age 66)	31 October 1980	Incumbent	—
		Pahlavi dynasty			1878–current (aged 148)	15 December 1925	11 February 1979	53 years

=== Reign of Pahlavi monarchs and tenure of later pretenders; and their lifespan ===
Source:

== Consorts ==
– In pretence

Number	Picture	Name	Father	Lifespan	Marriage	Became consort	Ceased to be consort	Spouse
I		Tadj ol-Molouk	Teymūr Khan Ayromlou	1896–1982	1916	15 December 1925	16 September 1941 (husband abdicated)	Reza Pahlavi
II		Esmat Dowlatshahi	Gholam Ali Mirza Dowlatshahi	1905–1995	1923	15 December 1925	16 September 1941 (husband abdicated)	Reza Pahlavi
III		Princess Fawzia of Egypt	Fuad I of Egypt	1921–2013	1939	16 September 1941	17 November 1948 (divorced)	Mohammad Reza Pahlavi
IV		Soraya Esfandiary-Bakhtiary	Khalil Esfandiary-Bakhtiary	1932–2001	12 February 1951		15 March 1958 (divorced)	Mohammad Reza Pahlavi
V		Farah Diba	Sohrab Diba	1938–current	21 December 1959 (as queen consort)		11 February 1979 (husband was deposed)	Mohammad Reza Pahlavi
V		Farah Diba	Sohrab Diba	1938–current	26 October 1967 (as empress consort)		27 July 1980 (widowed)	Mohammad Reza Pahlavi
Office vacant from 27 July 1980 to 12 June 1986
VI		Yasmine Etemad-Amini	Abdullah Etemad-Amini	1968–current	12 June 1986		Incumbent	Reza Pahlavi

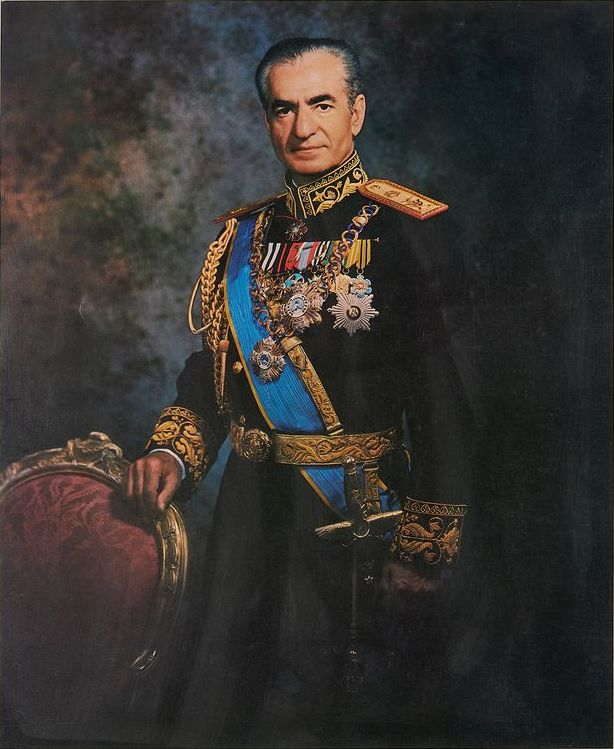
Mohammad Reza Shah Pahlavi, 1960s

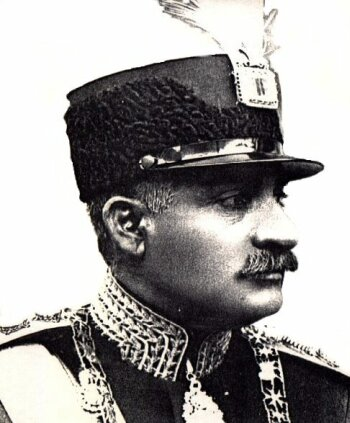
Reza Shah Pahlavi, 1940s

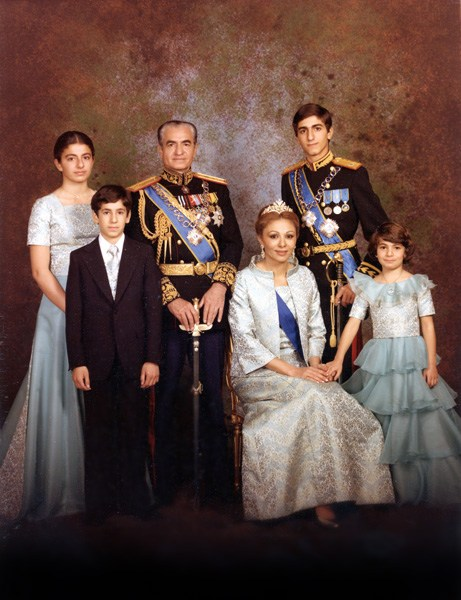
Official portrait of the Iranian royal family 1978.

== Heirs ==
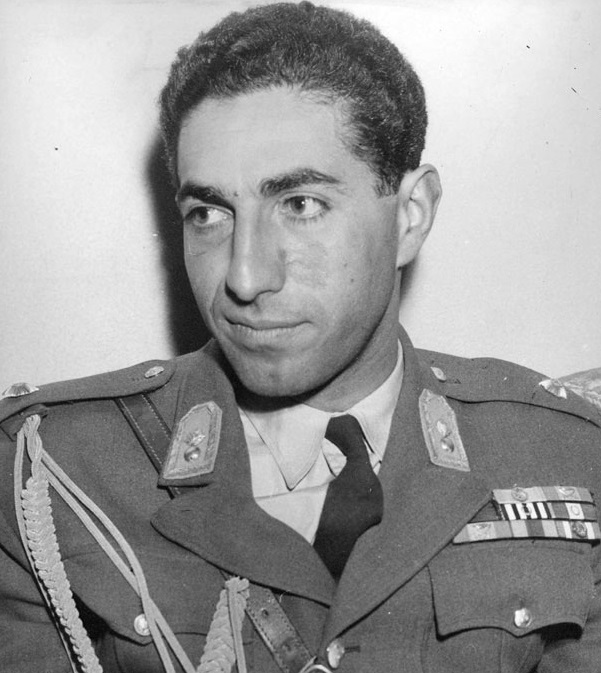
Prince Ali-Reza Pahlavi, the heir presumptive until his death in 1954

The 1906 constitution of Iran specifically provided that only a male who was not descended from the Qajar dynasty could become the heir apparent. This made all half-brothers of Mohammad Reza ineligible to become heirs to the throne. Until his death in 1954, the Shah's only full brother Ali Reza was his heir presumptive. The constitution also required the Shah to be of Iranian descent, meaning that his father and mother are Iranian.

=== Line of succession in February 1979 ===
- Reza Shah Pahlavi (1878–1944)
  - Mohammad Reza Shah Pahlavi (1919–1980)
    - (1) Crown Prince Reza Pahlavi (b. 1960)
    - (2) Prince Ali-Reza Pahlavi (1966-2011)
  - Prince Ali-Reza Pahlavi (1922–1954)
    - (3) Prince Patrick Ali Pahlavi (b. 1947)
      - (4) Prince Davoud Pahlavi (b. 1972)
      - (5) Prince Houd Pahlavi (b. 1973)
      - (6) Prince Mohammad Pahlavi (b. 1976)

=== Current line of succession ===
- Reza Shah Pahlavi (1878–1944)
  - Mohammad Reza Shah Pahlavi (1919–1980)
    - Crown Prince Reza Pahlavi (b. 1960)
    - Prince Ali-Reza Pahlavi (1966–2011)
  - Prince Ali-Reza Pahlavi (1922–1954)
    - (1) Prince Patrick Ali Pahlavi (b. 1947)
      - (2) Prince Davoud Pahlavi (b. 1972)
      - (3) Prince Houd Pahlavi (b. 1973)
        - (4) Prince Rafaël Pahlavi (b. 2006)
      - (5) Prince Mohammad Pahlavi (b. 1976)

=== List of crown princes ===
Name		Portrait	Relationship to monarch	Became heir	Ceased to be heir; reason
Office vacant from 15 December 1925 to 24 April 1926
1	Mohammad Reza Pahlavi	Mohammad Reza Shah	Eldest son	25 April 1926	16 September 1941 (Became Shah)
Office vacant from 16 September 1941 to 26 October 1967
2	Reza Pahlavi	Reza Pahlavi, Crown Prince of Iran	Eldest son	1 November 1960 (proclaimed) 26 October 1967 (designated)	11 February 1979 (Father deposed)

=== Heirs to the headship (since 1979) ===
No.	Name	Portrait	Relationship to head	Became heir	Ceased to be heir; reason
1	Reza Pahlavi		Eldest son	11 February 1979	31 October 1980 (Became head)
2	Ali Reza Pahlavi		Younger brother	31 October 1980	4 January 2011 (died)
3	Noor Pahlavi		Eldest daughter	4 January 2011	Incumbent
3	Patrick Ali Pahlavi		cousin	4 January 2011	Incumbent

The Persian Constitution of 1906 specifically provided that only a male could become the heir, with the current candidate being Patrick Ali Pahlavi. However, Pahlavi has declared his eldest daughter, Noor Pahlavi, as his heir

== Use of titles ==
- Shâh: Emperor, followed by Shâhanshâh of Iran, with style His Imperial Majesty
- Shahbânu: Shahbânu or Empress, followed by first name, followed by "of Iran", with style Her Imperial Majesty
- Valiahd: Crown Prince of Iran, with style His Imperial Highness
- Younger sons: Prince (Shâhpūr, or Shah's Son), followed by first name and surname (Pahlavi), and style His Imperial Highness.
- Daughters: Princess (Shâhdokht, or Shah's Daughter), followed by first name and surname (Pahlavi), and style Her Imperial Highness.
- Children of the monarch's daughter/s use another version of Prince (Vâlâ Gohar, "of superior essence") or Princess (Vâlâ Gohari), which indicate descent in the second generation through the female line, and use the styles His Highness or Her Highness. This is then followed by first name and father's surname, whether he was royal or a commoner. However, the children by the last Shah's sister Fatemeh, who married an American businessman as her first husband, are surnamed Pahlavi Hillyer and do not use any titles.

== See also ==
- List of Shia dynasties
- List of Muslim states and dynasties
- Imperial Standards of Iran
- Monarchism in Iran

— Royal house — Pahlavi dynasty Founding year: 1925 Deposition: 1979
Preceded by House of Qajar	Ruling house of Iran; 15 December 1925 – 11 February 1979	Vacant Monarchy abolished Republic declared
