= Etemadi =

Etemadi (Persian: اعتمادی) is a surname. Notable people with the surname include:

- Amir Hossein Etemadi (born 1981), Iranian activist
- Agil Etemadi (born 1987), Iranian-Dutch professional footballer
- Khashayar Etemadi (born 1971), Iranian singer
- Mohammad Etemadi, Iranian professor in Electrical Engineering
- Mohammad Nur Ahmad Etemadi (1921–1979), Afghan diplomat and politician
- Parvaneh Etemadi (1948–2025), Iranian visual artist
- Raha Etemadi (born 1984), Iranian lyricist, producer, director, documentary producer and TV presenter
- Zabih Etemadi (born 1982), Iranian former professional footballer

== See also ==
- Etemadi's inequality, probability theory
- Etemad (disambiguation)
