= Ellian =

Ellian is a surname. Notable people with the surname include:

- Afshin Ellian (born 1966), Dutch legal scholar, philosopher, poet, and critic of Islam
- Ulysse Ellian (born 1988), Dutch lawyer and politician
