= Princess Iman =

Princess Iman may refer to:

- Princess Iman bint Hussein (born 1983), Jordanian royal, daughter of King Hussein and Queen Noor
- Princess Iman bint Abdullah (born 1996), Jordanian royal, daughter and second child of King Abdullah II and Queen Rania
- Princess Iman bint Hussein bin Abdullah (born 2024), Jordanian royal, daughter of Crown Prince Hussein and Princess Rajwa
- Princess Iman Pahlavi (born 1993), second child of Reza Pahlavi, former Crown Prince of Iran
