= Saeed Ghasseminejad =

Iranian financial economist and activist (born 1982)

- سعید قاسمی‌نژاد
- Ghasseminejad in 2025

Director of the Iran Prosperity Project
- Incumbent
- Assumed office 30 April 2025
- Leader: Reza Pahlavi
- Preceded by: Post established

Personal details
- Born: 1982 (age 43–44) Tehran, Iran
- Education: University of Tehran; École Spéciale des Travaux Publics; City University of New York (Ph.D.)
- Occupation: Financial economist; activist
- Website: saeedghasseminejad.com

Saeed Ghasseminejad (Note: Persian: سعید قاسمی‌نژاد, romanized: Sa'id Ğâsemīnežâd) (born 1982) is an Iranian financial economist and political activist who has been the director of the Iran Prosperity Project since 30 April 2025 and is the economic advisor to Reza Pahlavi. He is considered to be the central architect of Neo-Pahlavism, an ideology mostly based on Pahlavism.

Ghasseminejad is the Secretary General of the Iranian Liberal Students and Alumni Association and the Director of the Iranian Center for the Study of Liberalism. He is also a Research Fellow and Senior Advisor on Iran Affairs at the Foundation for Defense of Democracies. He is also a member of the Policy Council of the Persian-language magazine Fereydoun.

== Early life ==
Ghasseminejad was born in 1982, three years after the Iranian Revolution in Tehran, Iran.

== Career ==
Ghasseminejad received his bachelor's and master's degrees in civil engineering and transportation engineering from the University of Tehran. He was involved in student activities while studying in Iran. On 15 June 2003, Ghasseminejad, Amir Hossein Etemadi and other activists, were detained in solitary confinement in Ward 325 of Evin Prison by the prison's intelligence service. He was charged with rioting and disturbing public order. The Islamic Revolutionary Court sentenced him to two years in prison on 7 September 2007, for acting against national security by inciting rioting. Several of the arrested students, including Ghasseminejad, were forced to make forced confessions.

Ghasseminejad continued his studies at the master's level in sustainable development in construction and urban planning and financial sciences. He is pursuing a doctorate in finance at Baruch College in New York. Saeed worked in the field of civil engineering as a design engineer and project manager on highway and airport projects in Iran. While continuing his studies in France, he worked as a researcher in the field of geotechnical engineering. He also has a history of working with investment and insurance companies.

Ghasseminejad was one of the founders and spokespersons of the Iranian Liberal Students and Alumni Association. The group supported Mehdi Karroubi in the 2009 Iranian presidential election. He was announced in May 2019 as one of the four members of the Farshgerd Political Organization's advisory board. Ghasseminejad was a contractor for the US State Department in the Iran Disinfo project during the first presidency of Donald Trump.

Ghasseminejad's articles in Persian have been published in the online daily Advar News, Bamdad Khabar, and Cheragh Azadi. He has also been interviewed as an analyst on issues related to Iranian politics and economy by various Iranian and foreign audio and visual media, including Voice of America, France 24, Radio France Internationale, Radio Farda, BBC Persian, Radio Zamaneh, and Deutsche Welle.

Jonathan Conricus, the former spokesman for the IDF, said in an interview with CNN in October 2024: Ghasseminejad was mentioned as one of the FDD experts who played a role in preparing a map of targets in Iran in the event of a possible Israeli attack on the country.

== Views ==
In 2021, Ghasseminejad created the concept of an ideology called Neo-Pahlavism. He believes that this idea has the characteristics of freedom, realism, Iranism, and development. He considers a monarchy to be "much better and more effective" than a republic.
