= Etemad (disambiguation) =

Etemad or Etemaad (Persian: اعتماد, lit. 'Trust'; correct transcription: e'temād, because in the main pronunciation the word has a glottal stop) is a newspaper in Iran.

Etemad, Etemaad, or E'temad may also refer to:

== People ==
- Mirza Aqa Khan Nuri (1807–1865), Iranian politician known as Etemad al-Dawla
- Akbar Etemad (1930–2025), Iranian nuclear energy consultant and the first head of the Atomic Energy Organization of Iran
- Hamid Etemad (born 1945), Iranian-Canadian organizational theorist and academic
- Yasmine Etemad Amini (born 1968), lawyer and wife of Reza Pahlavi

== Places ==
- Etemad, Iran, an alternate name of the village Qarah Saqqal-e Olya

== Publications ==
- Indian Etemaad, also known as Etemaad Daily, a newspaper in India

== See also ==
- Etemadi, people with this surname
