= Princess Noor =

Princess Noor could refer to:

- Princess Noor bint Asem (born 1983), of Jordan
- Princess Noor Pahlavi (born 1992), oldest child of Reza Pahlavi, former Crown Prince of Iran

== See also ==
- Queen Noor of Jordan
