= Zane Adnan =

Indonesian basketball player

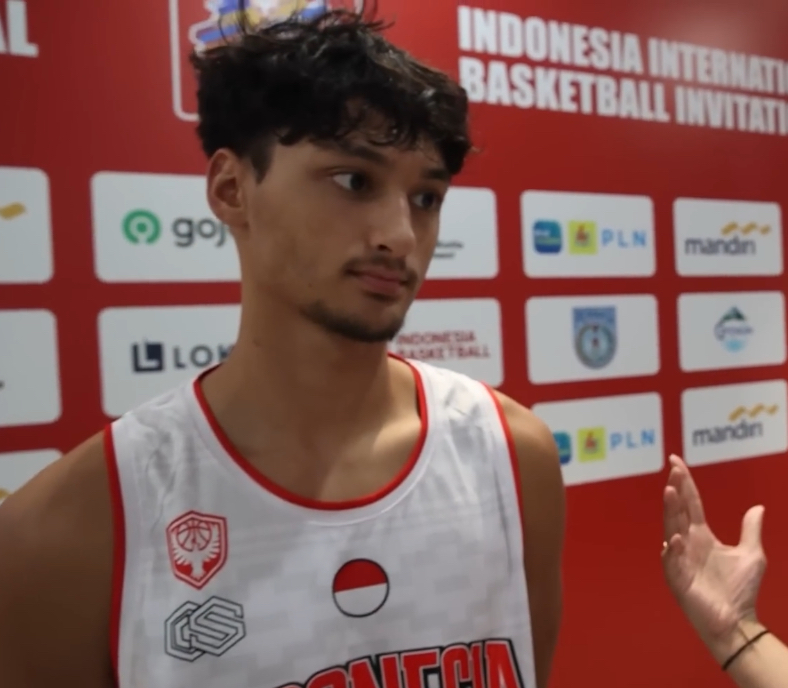
- Adnan in 2023

No. 55 – Amherst Mammoths
- Position: Shooting guard
- League: NESCAC

Personal information
- Listed height: 6 ft 3 in (1.91 m)
- Listed weight: 185 lb (84 kg)

Career information
- High school: Bullis School (Potomac, Maryland)
- College: Albany (2023-2025); Amherst (2025-present)

Zane William Adnan is a professional basketball player for the Amherst Mammoths of the New England Small College Athletic Conference (NESCAC).

== High school career ==
Adnan played varsity for four years. In his time with Bullis School he won the 2023 IAC Regular Season and also tournament champions.

== National team career ==
Adnan, only 18 years of age called up by the Indonesia national team to play in the International Basketball Invitational (IBII), played for 18 minutes, Adnan scored 13 points, 4 rebounds and 4 assist against Indonesia Patriots.

== College career ==
=== University of Albany ===
==== 2023-24 ====
Adnan appeared in 17 games, he averaged 0.7 PPG, 0.4 rebounds. His debut was against UMass Minutemen on November 7, 2023, and scored two points. His highest scoring game was against SUNY Potsdam on December 5, 2023, scoring eight points.

==== 2024-25 ====
Appeared in 11 games and had an averaged 4.7 minutes played. His highest scoring was against Maine Black Bears, scoring 3 points in 5 minutes played. On March 25, 2025, Adnan entered the NCAA transfer portal.

=== Amherst College ===
On April 25, 2025, Adnan transferred to Amherst College.

== Personal life ==
Adnan's Indonesian descent hails from his father who is from Jakarta.

His older brother, Noah, is currently playing for Loudoun United of the USL Championship.
