= Iraj Mesdaghi =

Iranian writer and academic

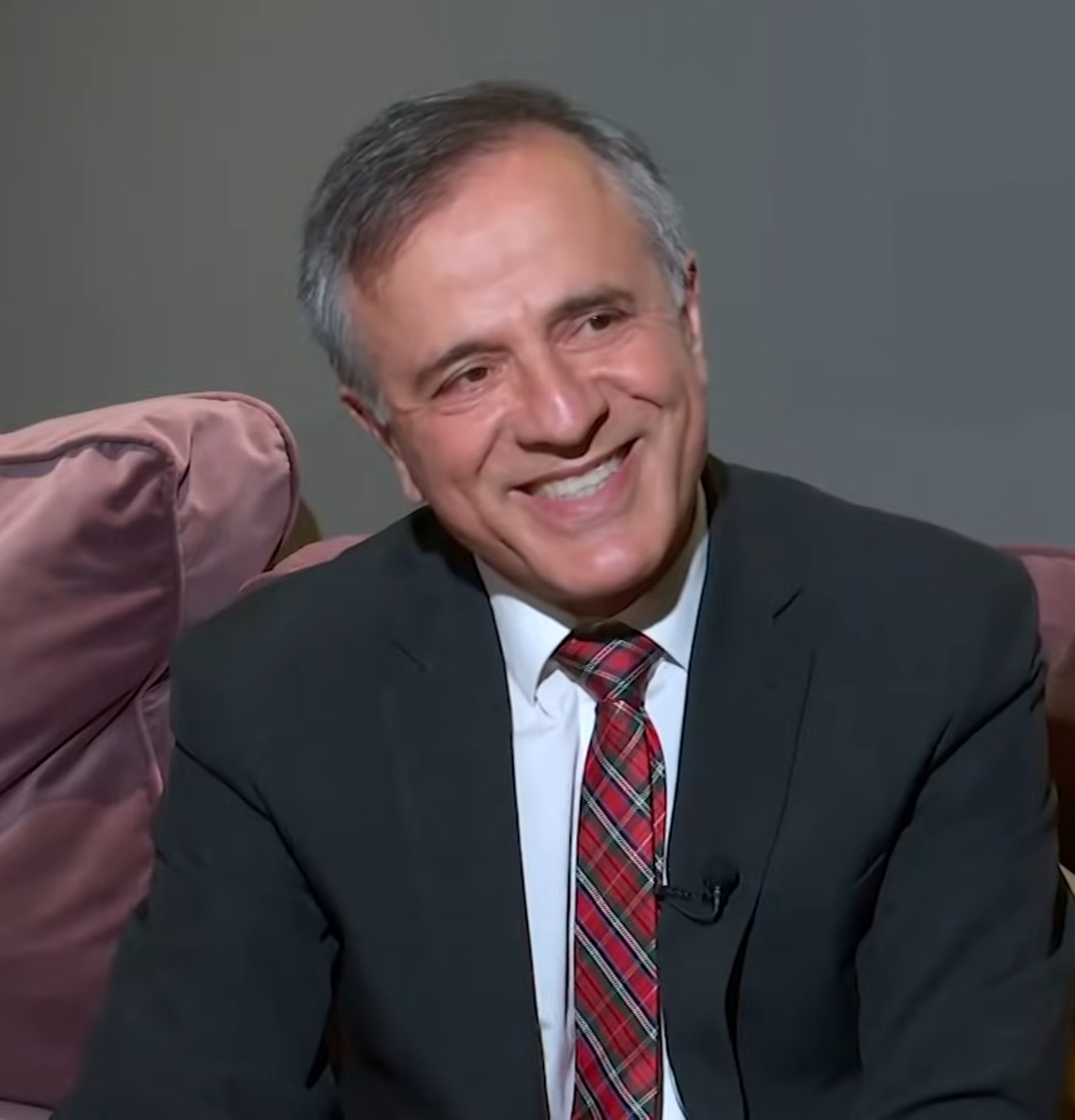
- Born: October 31, 1960; Tehran, Iran
- Occupations: Writer, activist
- Website: http://irajmesdaghi.com

Iraj Mesdaghi (Persian: ایرج مصداقی; born 1960) is an Iranian writer and activist best known for his involvement in the Trial of Hamid Nouri. He has lived in Stockholm, Sweden since 1994. Mesdaghi was formerly a political prisoner and a People's Mojahedin of Iran member.

On 16 March 2026, Reza Pahlavi appointed him as part of a committee to draft rules for creating transitional justice institutions in a proposed post-Islamic-Republic transitional government of Iran, headed by Shirin Ebadi, and including Leyla Bahmany and Afshin Ellian.

== Early life ==
Mesdaghi was born in 1960 in Tehran, Iran. As a teenager, he traveled to the United States to work with the Confederation of Iranian Students to revive the student movement unit. He returned to Iran after the Iranian revolution.

== Arrest in Iran ==
Mesdaghi was imprisoned in the Ghazelhasar, Evin and Gohardasht prisons for over 10 years, from 1981 to 1991, on charges of supporting the People's Mujahedin of Iran (MEK). He was affiliated with the MEK and worked at its headquarters in Auvers-sur-Oise, France, until 2001.

While in prison, Mesdaghi survived the 1988 mass executions of political prisoners in Iran. After being released, he was forced to flee from Iran to Sweden in 1994. Mesdaghi was a member of the "Committee for the Observation and Use of Iranian Justice Data", a committee created in 2019 aiming at ethical use of a computer file leaked from Iranian authorities that contained a "register of all the arrests, imprisonments and executions carried by the Iranian authorities in the Tehran area over four decades".

== Cooperation with Reza Pahlavi ==
On 16 March 2026, Reza Pahlavi appointed Mesdaghi as a member of the Transitional Justice Regulations Drafting Committee, together with Shirin Ebadi, Leyla Bahmany and Afshin Ellian, for developing rules for a transitional justice court and truth commission for Pahlavi's proposed post-Islamic-Republic transitional government of Iran.

== 1988 executions documentary ==
Mesdaghi was featured prominently in the documentaryThose Who Said No, directed by Nima Sarvestani. The film documents an international investigation of mass executions of political prisoners in Iran in the 1980s. It was shown at the IDFA.

== Involvement in Hamid Noury arrest ==
On 9 November 2019, the Swedish police apprehended Hamid Noury at Arlanda Airport after he was lured to Sweden by Iraj Mesdaghi. In 2019, Mesdaghi was contacted by an acquaintance of Noury and together, they began to devise a plan to lure Noury to Sweden. They wanted to bring him to Sweden, where he could be tried for the alleged crimes under universal jurisdiction, a legal precedent allowing for serious crimes to be tried in Swedish courts, regardless of where in the world they were committed. They arranged his flight ticket and led him to believe that he was coming to Sweden for sightseeing, a cruise, meeting women, and partying. Iraj Mesdaghi shared the plan with international law experts and lawyers, who in turn contacted the Swedish police. When Noury landed at Arlanda Airport in November 2019, he was arrested.

Evidence from the Swedish investigation showed that Hamid Nouri's Gmail account contained a draft email and a sent email addressed to Mesdaghi's Gmail address. The emails reportedly contained no substantive content beyond a subject line in one case, and their significance remains disputed.

In early 2021, allegations of torture, inhumane treatment, murder, and war crimes were brought against Noury. He served as a deputy prosecutor and reportedly played a significant role in the 1988 executions of Iranian political prisoners. The charges against him became possible after the Swedish judicial system was granted permission to apply a so-called universal jurisdiction for crimes against international law, allowing prosecution of perpetrators regardless of where the crime was committed and regardless of the nationality of the perpetrators or victims. On 14 July 2022, the Stockholm District Court sentenced Hamid Noury to life imprisonment, and after serving the sentence, deportation for life.

Nouri was sentenced to life imprisonment in Sweden and permanently barred from re-entering the country. The conviction was upheld on appeal in December 2023. On 15 June 2024, he was released in a prisoner exchange for European Union diplomat Johan Floderus and Saeed Azizi.

== Selected Bibliography ==
- Neither Life Nor Death (Persian: نه زیستن نه مرگ)
- Bar Saghe-ye Tabide-ye Kanaf (Persian: بر ساقه تابیده کنف)
- Hell on Earth (Persian: دوزخ روی زمین), about torture in Iran
- A Look at the United Nations and the Violation of Fundamental Labour Rights in Iran (Persian: نگاهی به سازمان بین‌المللی کار و نقض حقوق بنیادین کار در ایران)
- Negahi ba Chashm-e Jan (Persian: نگاهی با چشم جان)
- Raghs-e Qoqnusha va Avaz-e Khakestar (Persian: رقص ققنوس‌ها و آواز خاکستر)
- The United Nations and the Violation of Human Rights in Iran (Persian: سازمان ملل متحد و نقض حقوق بشر در ایران)
