= Afshin Ellian =

Iranian-born Dutch professor of law, philosopher, poet and critic of political Islam

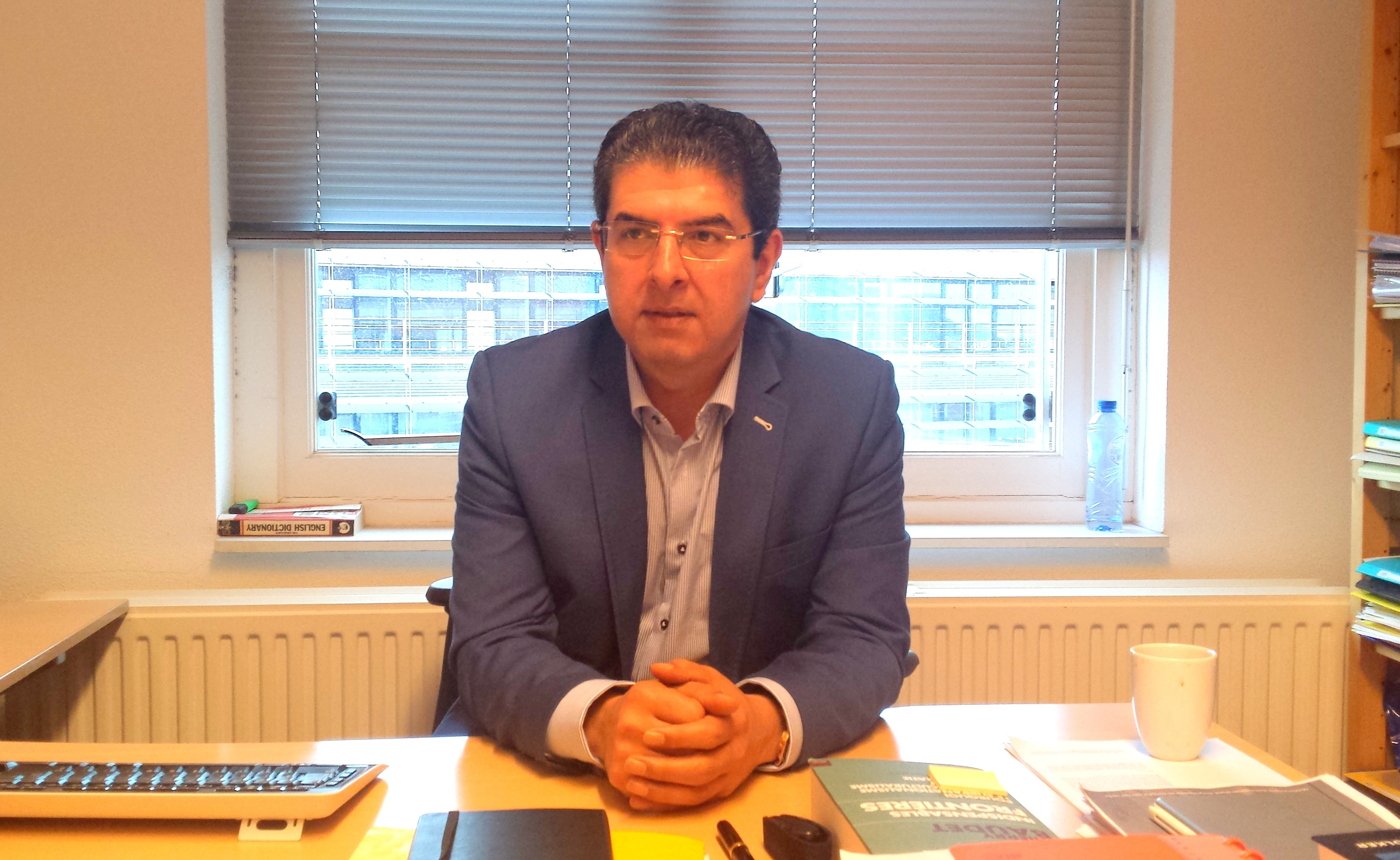
- Leiden University, 2015
- Born: 27 February 1966 (age 60); Tehran, Iran
- Citizenship: Netherlands
- Children: 2, including Ulysse Ellian

Academic background
- Education: Tilburg University (LLM, PhD)
- Thesis: Een onderzoek naar de Waarheids- en Verzoeningscommissie van Zuid-Afrika (2003)
- Doctoral advisor: Marc Groenhuijsen

Academic work
- Discipline: Philosophy of law
- Institutions: Leiden Law School
- Website: Leiden University

Afshin Ellian (born 27 February 1966 in Tehran, Iran) is an Iranian-born Dutch professor of law, philosopher, poet, and critic of political Islam. He is an expert in international public law and philosophy of law.

On 16 March 2026, Reza Pahlavi appointed Ellian as a member of the Transitional Justice Regulations Drafting Committee of Pahlavi's proposed post-Islamic-Republic transitional government of Iran.

== Youth ==
Ellian grew up in Iran. As a youngster, he learned the profession of journalism with one of the most prominent journalists of Iran. He was a freelance journalist for Iranian political magazines aimed at youth. During the Iranian Revolution 1978-1979 he became, like many youngsters of his age, a supporter of the Fedayan-e Khalq-e Iran.

== Politics, exile and legal scholarship ==
After the revolution, the Fadaiyan-e-Khalq split. Many followers become adherents of either the majority branch of this party or supporters of the Tudeh Party of Iran. Ellian became both a member of the Tudeh Party of Iran and active with the Youth Organization of Tudeh Party of Iran. The Islamic government prohibited and suppressed all political parties and activities which were not aligned with it after the Revolution. This meant that also Ellian was in danger of being arrested which, hence, led him to go underground and finally to escape from Iran. He decided to escape to Pakistan. In Pakistan, he still faced extradition back to Iran thus shortly afterwards he fled to Afghanistan where already a community of intellectuals and activists from Iran had gathered. There he met Siavash Kasraie who was also a member of the Tudeh Party of Iran and from whom he learned poetry. Besides he studied medicine for few years in the capital, Kabul. Slowly on an ideological struggle occurred between him and the leaders of the Tudeh Party in Kabul who were, in Ellian's point of view, Stalinist figures which was reason enough for him and few of his friends to break up with the Tudeh Party of Iran. In the fall of 1987, he decided to seek asylum with the Permanent Representative of the United Nations in Kabul whereupon, in 1989, he was invited to come to the Netherlands and was flown out of the country by the United Nations together with other dissidents who were also in danger.

In 1989, Ellian arrived in the Netherlands as a political refugee. Having experienced first-hand the Islamic theocratic government of Iran, he writes often about how such issues are affecting the world in general and the Netherlands in particular. In 2025, due to threats on his life tied to such criticism, he was heavily guarded.

Ian Buruma, among others, accuses Ellian of misrepresentation. On the other hand, Ibn Warraq asserts “Buruma gets these basic facts upside down. Ellian never misrepresented his identity or his past, nor did he arrive in the Netherlands under false pretenses”. Spuriousness of such allegations is, for instance, also asserted by others like J. Hoeksma who, as part of the legal staff of the Dutch representation of the UNHCR at the time, also confirms the opposite of the aforementioned allegations. The same grievances have been brought to the fore by, among others, Ellian himself and Frits Bolkestein due to which Buruma was, together with his publisher “Publishing House Penguin”, forced to make many changes and removals in later editions of his book. Other prominent persons defending the truthfulness of Ellian's case include the Nobel Prize winner of Literature Mario Vargas Llosa.

In the Netherlands Ellian started his studies of law at the Catholic University of Brabant (now the University of Tilburg). In 1996, he graduated with a degree in international public law, criminal law, and philosophy. He remained in Brabant as a researcher until he found a position with the Amsterdam Center for International Law, of the University of Amsterdam. He obtained a PhD from the University of Tilburg in 2003, The title of his doctoral dissertation is: "An Investigation into the Truth and Reconciliation Commission of South Africa". In this research he focused on the political transition sparked by the South-African Truth and Reconciliation Commission; questions pertaining to both international criminal law and legal philosophy. Central in his research stood the question: “why did the South Africans opt for a tribunal and the possibility of amnesty instead of a criminal tribunal that could try and punish the crimes of the past?”. It is worth to bring to attention for those who are interested in this topic that a further reading on this can be found in a later academic book wherein he has contributed by means of his article titled “Political Transition to a Democratic Regime: The South African Echoes of Forgiveness, Truth Commission and Negotiating Justice”. In his aforementioned research, he concluded that the commission was an acceptable tribunal worthy of international respect. In 2003 he became an associated professor of jurisprudence, and since 2005 he is a full professor at the law faculty of the University of Leiden. Since 2012 he is the academic director of the Institute for the Interdisciplinary Study of the Law at the law faculty of Leiden.

Ellian was a regular columnist for NRC Handelsblad, and makes appearances on political discussion programs on Dutch television. Ellian writes articles for the magazine Elsevier but also for international magazines and newspapers such as The Wall Street Journal, Le Monde, and Le Figaro.

Following the 2009 Iranian presidential election, Ellian wrote an open letter to Ali Khamenei, the Supreme Leader of Iran. The letter was published by German magazine Der Spiegel, Le Monde, The Wall Street Journal, and Dutch newspaper NRC Handelsblad. Der Spiegel subtitled the letter "Your Regime Is Finished" (not a direct quote from Ellian), while NRC Handelsblad subtitled it "The children of the revolution will accept the ayatollah's rule no more".

On 16 March 2026, Reza Pahlavi appointed Ellian as a member of the Transitional Justice Regulations Drafting Committee, together with Shirin Ebadi, Leyla Bahmany and Iraj Mesdaghi, for developing rules for a transitional justice court and truth commission for Pahlavi's proposed post-Islamic-Republic transitional government of Iran.

== Books ==
Afshin Ellian has published books defending freedom of speech and about Iran, "The State of Exception and Militant Democracy in a Time of Terror".

== Quotes ==
- "The extremists are afraid that if Dutch society becomes a safe haven for an intellectual discussion of political Islam, it will be very dangerous for them"
- "Free speech is in danger of being increasingly restricted by invoking “Islamophobia” and “racism”. And some intellectuals have already capitulated. For example, the opera Aisha was called off in Rotterdam in 2001, because the wife of the Prophet was depicted on stage. The production had to be cancelled because a number of actresses felt threatened. Recently a columnist on the national daily NRC Handelsblad, Hasna el Maroudi was forced to abandon her column because of threats of violence from the Moroccan community. What has happened to civil courage? Why do we hear nothing from the publishers, artists, media and colleagues of people who have capitulated about the consequences of this voluntary capitulation?
  We should expect civil courage not only from those who are threatened, but also from those around them, their publishers, producers, colleagues, etc."
- "Five years ago, my Afghan sister-in-law emigrated to the United States, where she now works, pays taxes and takes part in public life. If she had turned up in Europe, she would still be undergoing treatment from social workers for her trauma—and she still wouldn't have got a job or won acceptance as a citizen."
- In an open letter to Ali Khamenei, the Supreme Leader of Iran:

"Excellency, the demonstrations attest that the people of Iran, the children of the revolution, will accept your rule no more. Your regime is no longer able to exercise sovereignty over the Iranian people without the recourse to violence -- extreme violence. I urge you to recognize that Iran is now undeniably at a crossroads: Either the will of the people is accepted and a peaceful transition to democracy is achieved or you plan to respond to these protests by launching a bloodbath, which will cause unprecedented chaos in Iran. Ask yourself: Can a regime, hated and rejected by a huge majority of the population, transform itself into a democratic administration that recognizes the rule of law? Has it ever in history been possible for a political transition to take place peacefully and without the shedding of blood?"

== Bibliography ==
- Brieven van een Pers (ISBN 90-290-7522-8)
- Allah Weet het Niet Beter (ISBN 9789029078559)
- Media en Strafrecht (co-author)
- Verrijzenis van woorden (poetry)
- Mensenherfst (poetry)
- “Political Islam and the Attack on Religious Freedom”. Telos 145 (Winter 2008). New York: Telos Press.
