= Iman Pahlavi =

Iranian-American member of the House of Pahlavi (born 1993)

- Born: Iman Laya Pahlavi; September 12, 1993 (age 33); Washington, D.C. area, United States
- Spouse: Bradley Sherman (m. 2025)
- House: Pahlavi
- Father: Reza Pahlavi
- Mother: Yasmine Etemad-Amini

Iman Laya Pahlavi (Persian: ایمان لعیا پهلوی; born September 12, 1993) is an Iranian-American member of the exiled House of Pahlavi. She is the second of three daughters of Reza Pahlavi, the former Crown Prince of Iran, and Yasmine Pahlavi, and a granddaughter of Mohammad Reza Pahlavi, the last Shah of Iran, and Empress Farah.

== Early life and education ==
Pahlavi was born in the suburbs of Washington, D.C., where her family has lived in exile since the 1979 revolution. She finished high school at Bullis School in Potomac, Maryland, in 2011, and graduated from the University of Michigan in 2015 with a Bachelor of Arts in psychology and communications.

== Career ==
Pahlavi lives in New York City and has been reported to work in finance at American Express.

== Personal life ==
Pahlavi met American businessman Bradley Sherman through mutual friends in New York in 2017. Their engagement was announced by her mother on Instagram in August 2023.

The couple held a civil ceremony in Manhattan in May 2025, followed by a wedding celebration in Paris on 7–8 June 2025, attended by members of the Pahlavi family including Empress Farah. Sherman is Jewish, and the celebration included the traditional Jewish chair dance; the wedding drew comment in Iranian diaspora and Jewish media as a symbolic interfaith union.

Her sisters are Noor Pahlavi (born 1992) and Farah Pahlavi (born 2004).
