= Amir Hossein Etemadi =

Iranian activist (born 1981)

- امیر‌حسین اعتمادی
- Born: Amir Hossein Etemadi Bozorg; 1 November 1981 (age 45); Tehran, Iran
- Education: University of Tehran
- Years active: 2003–present
- Known for: Senior advisor to Reza Pahlavi

Amir Hossein Etemadi Bozorg (Persian: امیر‌حسین اعتمادی بزرگ; born 1 November 1981) is an Iranian political activist and former student activist. Etemadi, who considers himself a subversive, politically supports Reza Pahlavi and is one of his senior advisors.

== Career ==
=== Education and student activism (1999–2010) ===
Etemadi began his political activities when he entered the Faculty of Engineering at the University of Tehran in 1999 to study mechanical engineering. He was a member of the Faculty of Engineering student council from 2000 to 2003. In November 2002, he began publishing the political newspaper Farda, a student newspaper, in a single page at the University of Tehran. On 15 June 2003, Etemadi and several other students, including Saeed Ghasseminejad, were arrested and imprisoned in Evin Prison. Their families protested the uncertainty of their status by appearing before the Article 90 Commission of the Islamic Consultative Assembly. Etemadi was released in August of that year. The Public Relations Department of the Tehran Public and Revolutionary Prosecutor's Office announced in a statement about them: "Based on the Leader's approval of the request for the release of students who were arrested in recent events and who have declared their innocence of sedition and agitators and have declared their loyalty to the sacred system of the Islamic Republic, these students have been released." These students believed that their release was because the prosecution, during its interrogations, did not find evidence of them disrupting national security or engaging in armed activity, and that Ali Khamenei's pardon was a cover for their release.

Etemadi was among the liberal students at Tehran University. Etemadi and Ghasseminejad were one of the founders of the Iranian Liberal Students and Alumni Association . During the 2009 Iranian presidential election, Etemadi was among the people and in charge of the provincial campaign of Mehdi Karroubi, one of the two reformist candidates. He was the editor-in-chief of the websites Bamdad Khabar and Qasr.

=== Political activism (2010–present) ===
Etemadi was forced into exile in September 2010, first as a refugee in Turkey and then in October 2011 in the United States. In 2010, Etemadi declared the "Federal Republic of Iran" his preferred political system for Iran.

Etemadi has testified before the United States House of Representatives Foreign Affairs Committee.

Etemadi was one of the founders and most influential members of the Farshgerd group. Farshgerd, which called itself a "political action network," supported Reza Pahlavi, the last crown prince of Iran. Etemadi cited Pahlavi's consistent and steadfast struggle against the Islamic Republic of Iran and "the fact that the Pahlavis have worked so hard for the development of Iran" as reasons for his support for Pahlavi.

After Donald Trump was elected president of the United States in 2016, thirty political activists, including Etemadi, wrote a letter to him urging the new US administration to "expand existing sanctions against the Islamic Revolutionary Guard Corps and Ayatollah Khamenei's financial empire." The letter drew widespread reactions on Iranian social media, with 317 other political activists calling the signatories eager for "an escalation of the atmosphere, the imposition of sanctions, and possibly a military confrontation."

Etemadi is currently Reza Pahlavi's closest advisor. He accompanied Pahlavi on his trip to Israel in 2023.

In 2020, Etemadi was one of the signatories of a letter calling on the International Monetary Fund that would have been better not to give Iran a $5 billion loan to combat the coronavirus-2019. The signatories of the letter believed that Iran had the financial resources necessary to combat the pandemic.
