= Bullis School =

Coordinates: 39°01′42″N 77°12′00″W

Location
- 10601 Falls Road; Potomac, Maryland 20854; United States

Information
- Type: Private preparatory school
- Motto: "Caring, Challenging, Community"
- Established: 1930; 96 years ago
- Founder: William Bullis
- NCES School ID: 00579379
- Head of School: Christian Sullivan
- Teaching staff: 101 (on an FTE basis) (2021-22)
- Grades: K-12
- Enrollment: 1020 (2025-26)
- Student to teacher ratio: 1:7 (2025-26)
- Campus: Suburban
- Campus size: 102 acres (0.41 km^{2}); 11 buildings
- Colors: Blue and gold
- Athletics conference: Interstate Athletic Conference (boys); Independent School League (girls)
- Mascot: Bulldog
- Website: www.bullis.org
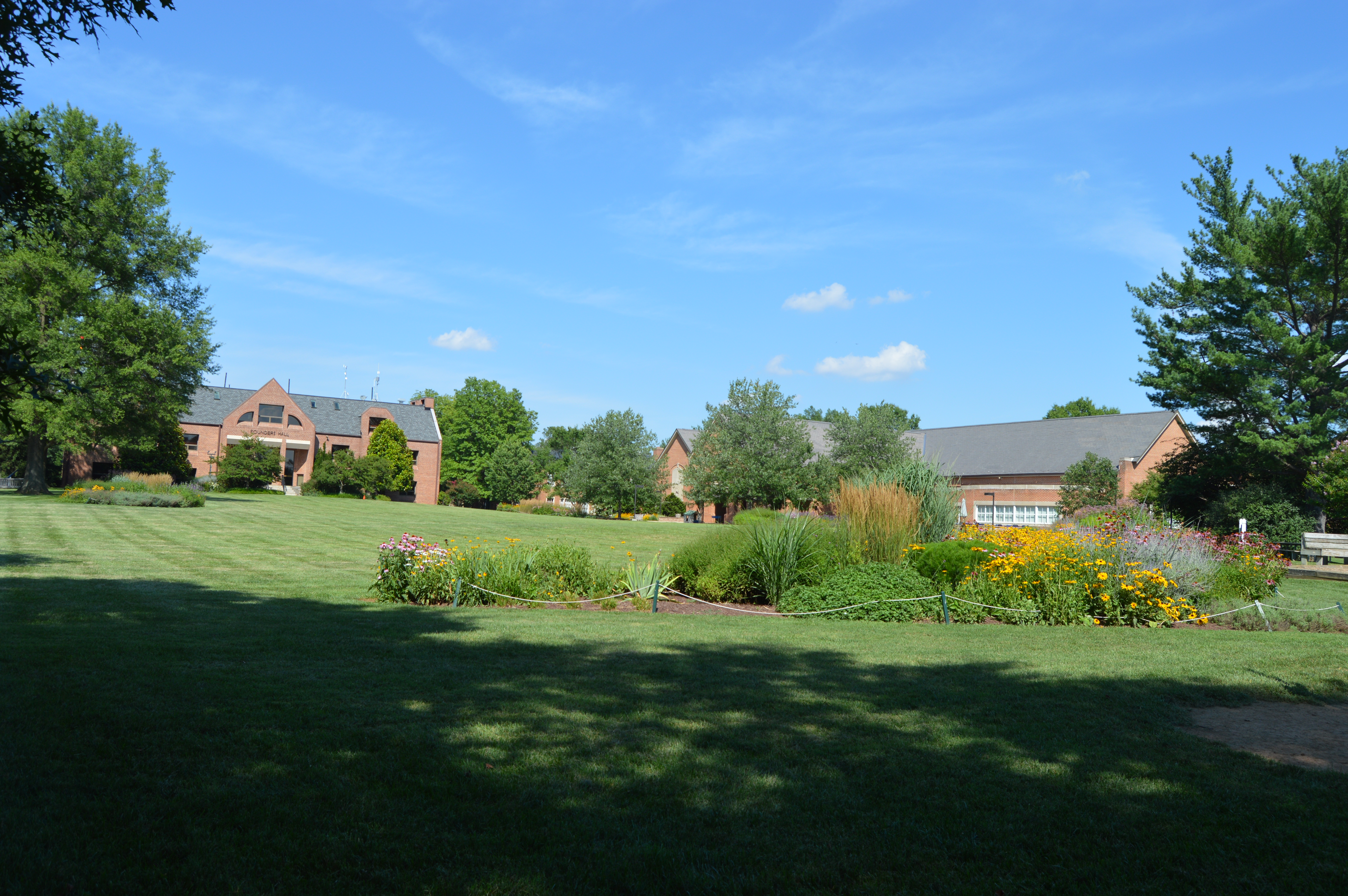
- Bullis School Bethesda Maryland in 2015

Bullis School is a private, co-educational college preparatory day school for grades K-12. The school is located in Potomac, Maryland, a suburb of Washington, D.C.

== History ==
Bullis School was founded in Washington D.C. in 1930 by Commander Bullis as a preparatory school for the United States Naval Academy and the United States Military Academy at West Point, New York. The school moved in 1935 to Silver Spring, Maryland, and began its four-year college preparatory program. Between 1964 and 1971, the school moved to its current location in Potomac, Maryland, and in 1981, became a co-educational institution.

== Academics ==
According to Bullis' 2021-2026 Strategic Plan, the school aims to "promote joyfulness and intentionally avoid an atmosphere of overwhelming stress and pressure."

Students from the graduating class of 2023 matriculated to 83 different colleges and universities.

Bullis is accredited by the Association of Independent Maryland & DC Schools (AIMS) and Maryland State Department of Education and is a member of the Middle States Association of Colleges and Schools.

== Athletics ==
Competitive sports are introduced in Middle School. Upper and Middle School students participate in more than 60 interscholastic teams in a variety of sports with other area independent schools.

Upper School students participate in the IAC and ISL leagues. Fall sports include football, cheerleading, boys and girls soccer, girls' tennis, field hockey and cross-country. Winter sports include boys and girls basketball, wrestling, ice hockey and swimming. Spring sports include softball, baseball, boys and girls' lacrosse, boys' tennis, golf, and track and field.

== Green energy ==
Bullis ranks fourth in the US for K-12 schools according to the EPA's Green Power Partnership. The school is powered by wind through the purchase of wind credits and the production of solar energy from 540 photovoltaic solar panels installed in December 2009 on the roof of the school's Blair Center.

== Notable alumni ==
- Steve Armas, professional soccer player
- Cam Brown, NFL linebacker
- Tom Brown, professional football player
- Monique Currie, basketball player
- John Diehl, professional football player
- Seth Davis, broadcaster
- Moise Fokou, professional football player
- Amy B. Harris, screenwriter and producer
- Dwayne Haskins, NFL quarterback
- Justin Herron, NFL offensive tackle
- Tanard Jackson, NFL safety
- Doug Moe, professional basketball player and coach
- Matthew Ogens, Emmy award-winning film director, creative director, photographer and artist
- Noor Pahlavi, granddaughter of the last Shah of Iran
- Iman Pahlavi, granddaughter of the last Shah of Iran
- Farah Pahlavi, granddaughter of the last Shah of Iran
- John Phillips, musician
- Caroline Queen, Olympic kayaker
- Henry Rollins, musician
- Masai Russell, NCAA record holder and 2024 Olympic gold medalist in the women's 100 metres hurdles
- Robert Sampson, professional basketball player
- Jake Scott, All-American University of Georgia and NFL safety
- Christian Veilleux, college football quarterback for the Georgia State Panthers
- Rodney Wallace, professional soccer player
- Ryan Willie, track and field athlete
- Quincy Wilson, track and field athlete
