= Agil Etemadi =

Dutch footballer (born 1987)

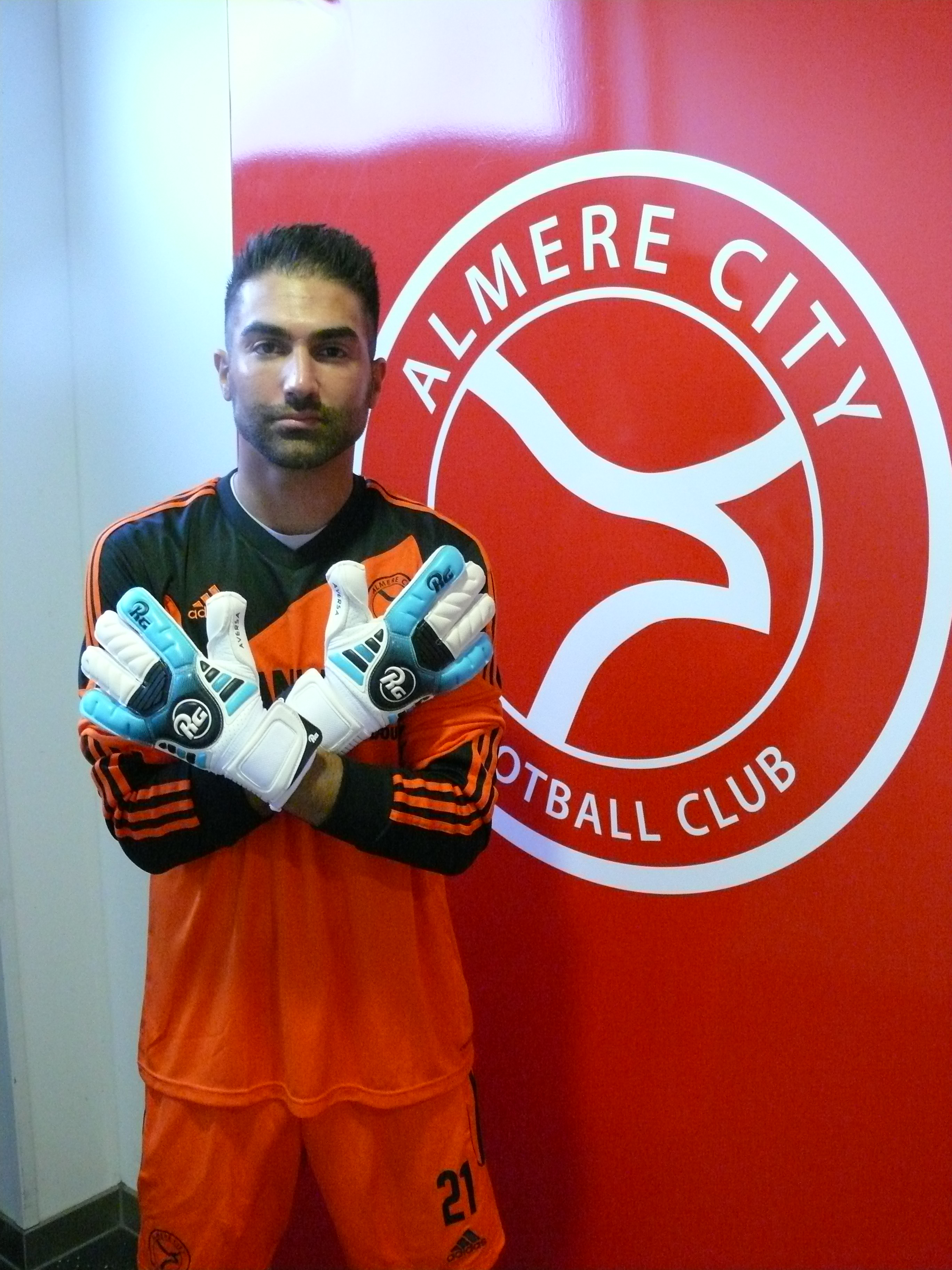
- Etemadi in 2015

Personal information
- Date of birth: 23 April 1987 (age 39)
- Place of birth: Tehran, Iran
- Position: Goalkeeper

Youth career
- vv GAVC
- 1996–2007: Heerenveen

Senior career*
Years	Team	Apps	(Gls)
2007–2010	Heerenveen	0	(0)
2009–2010	→ Emmen (loan)	12	(0)
2010–2011	Veendam	1	(0)
2011–2012	Groningen	0	(0)
2011–2012	→ Tractor (loan)	0	(0)
2012–2013	Tractor	9	(0)
2013–2016	Almere City	60	(0)
2016–2017	Sanat Naft	0	(0)
2017–2019	De Graafschap	3	(0)
2019–2023	Almere City	30	(0)
Total		115	(0)

International career
2007	Netherlands U21	3	(0)
- * Club domestic league appearances and goals

Agil Etemadi (Persian: عقیل اعتمادی; born 23 April 1987) is a former professional footballer who played as a goalkeeper. Born in Iran, he has represented the Netherlands at youth level.

== Club career ==
After starting as a youth player for vv GAVC from Grou, Etemadi moved to SC Heerenveen and came through their youth system. He later played for Eerste Divisie teams Emmen, Veendam and Almere City. He also was a back-up goalkeeper at Groningen and played in Iran for Tractor Sazi.

He went on a trial with Iran Pro League club Steel Azin in 2009 but he was not signed. In summer 2017, Etemadi signed a two-year contract with another Eerste Divisie side, De Graafschap.

== International career ==
Etemadi was invited to the Netherlands U21 national team in 2007. In 2009 he stated that he wished to play for the Iran national team.

== Coaching career ==
Etemadi retired as a player in June 2023, becoming Almere City's goalkeeping coach.

== Personal life ==
Etemadi was born in Tehran, Iran and moved to Holland, aged 6. He can fluently speak his native language Persian. He is the brother of former footballer Zabih Etemadi.
