= Ulysse Ellian =

Dutch lawyer and politician (born 1988)

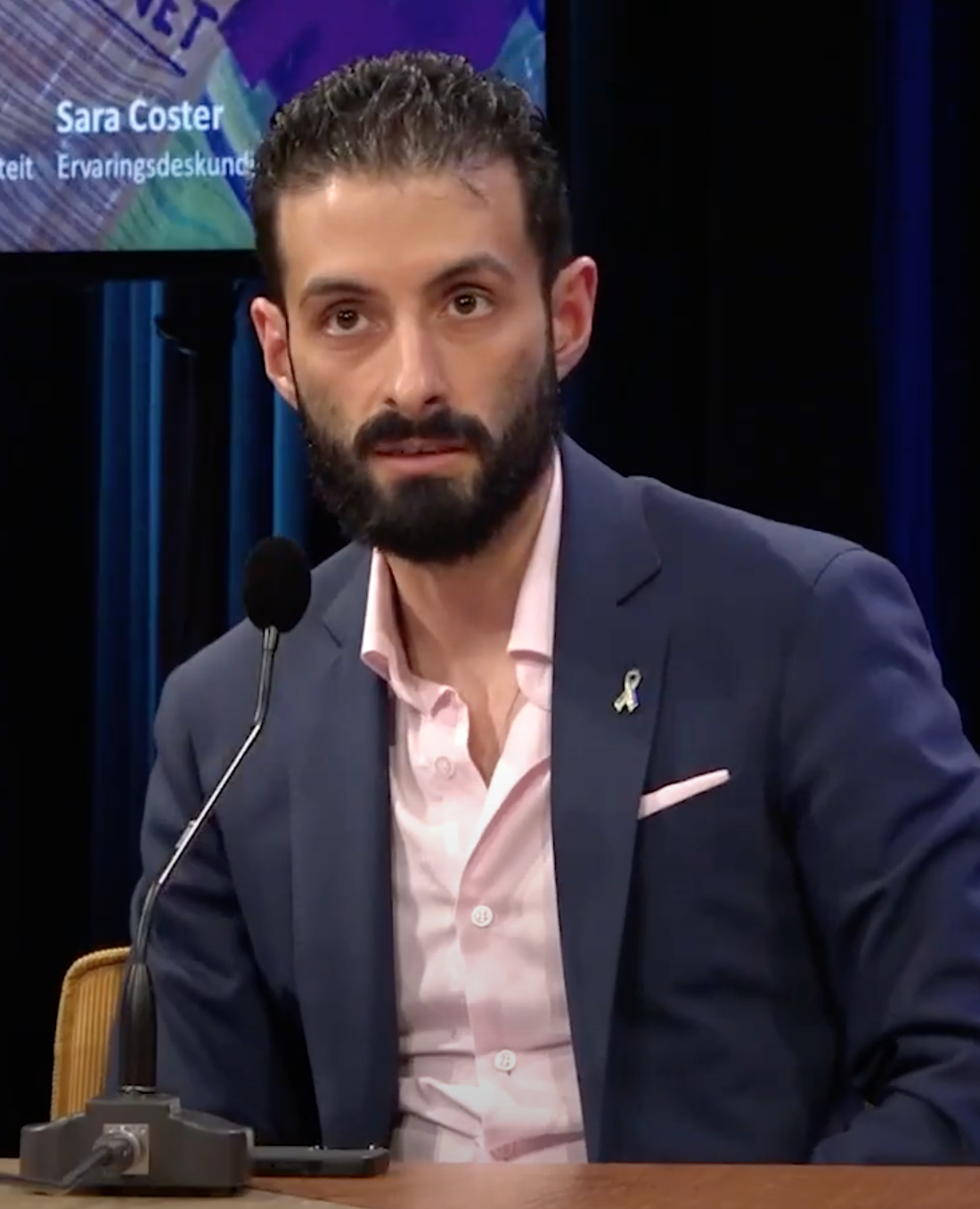
- Ellian during a 2022 discussion at De Balie

Member of the House of Representatives
- Incumbent
- Assumed office 31 March 2021

Member of the Almere municipal council
- In office 29 March 2018 – 25 March 2021
- Succeeded by: Willem Knemeijer

Personal details
- Born: Ulysse Ellian; 17 September 1988 (age 38) Kabul, Afghanistan
- Citizenship: Netherlands
- Party: People's Party for Freedom and Democracy
- Domestic partner: Lesley van Hilten
- Children: 1 daughter 2 stepsons
- Parent: Afshin Ellian (father)
- Education: Vrije Universiteit Amsterdam
- Occupation: Lawyer; politician

Ulysse Ellian (born 17 September 1988) is a Dutch lawyer and politician. He has been a member of the House of Representatives since the 2021 general election on behalf of the conservative-liberal People's Party for Freedom and Democracy (VVD). Ellian also served as a municipal councilor in Almere between 2018 and 2021.

== Early life and legal career ==
He was born in 1988 in the Afghan capital Kabul as the son of Afshin Ellian, an Iranian law professor, poet, and critic of political Islam. His father had fled the Iranian regime and had met Ellian's mother in Afghanistan. His family came to the Netherlands in 1989, and Ellian grew up with his younger sister in Tilburg and Almere. He studied legal theory at the Vrije Universiteit Amsterdam and became a teacher and researcher specialized in private law at the university after his graduation in 2011. Ellian also started working as a lawyer, and he served as a staff member of the parliamentary inquiry into the failed high-speed rail service Fyra between 2013 and 2015.

== Politics ==
Ellian was elected to the Almere municipal council in the 2018 municipal elections as the VVD's second candidate after he had assisted the party's caucus in Almere since 2014. He succeeded Hilde van Garderen as the VVD's caucus leader when Van Garderen became an alderwoman two months after the March 2018 election. Ellian received security protection in 2019 after he had condemned the alleged role of the Iranian government in the murder of Mohammad-Reza Kolahi, who had been accused by Iran of having been involved in the Hafte Tir bombing in 1981 and lived in Almere under a false identity.

Criminal Naoufal F. filed a disciplinary complaint against Ellian in February 2020, because Ellian had said in an EenVandaag episode that F. had been responsible for Kolahi's murder on behalf of the Iranian government as Ridouan Taghi's right-hand man. F. had been convicted of organizing the murder but the case was on appeal. Ellian responded that he had not told any falsehoods, and he called the complaint "unacceptable intimidation of a politician". The Almere municipal council unanimously passed a motion supporting Ellian, and the disciplinary council declared the complaint unfounded in May.

=== House of Representatives ===
Ellian ran for member of parliament in the March 2021 general election, being placed 22nd on the VVD's party list. He vacated his seat in the Almere municipal council eight days after the election. Ellian was elected to the House with 1,931 preference votes and was sworn in on 31 March. His focus was on justice, law, constitutional matters, and antisemitism. In April 2022, an amendment by Ellian passed the House to lower the threshold for required disclosure of political donations from €4,500 to €1,000. In October 2022, in reaction to comments by Minister for Legal Protection Franc Weerwind (D66) that prisoners with a life sentence would be released more often, Ellian posted on social media platform Twitter that Weerwind "would not rest before all criminals vote D66". He took back his words shortly after following criticism.

Ellian has worked on the government's approach to organized crime. He filed a motion to increase scrutiny of contact with the outside world from prisoners at Nieuw Vosseveld, where high-level criminals including Ridouan Taghi are housed, in order to prevent them from continuing their criminal activities. It was carried by the House. Another motion of his limited the number of lawyers prisoners at maximum security prisons can have to two for the same reason. Ellian revealed in an interview in late 2022 that he had been under protection since a few months without naming the nature of the threat. He later told RTL Nieuws that he had received an intimidating message from the Iranian embassy in the Netherlands, stating that the country considered him to be an Iranian citizen subject to its laws, several weeks after he had become a member of parliament. Following his re-election in 2023, Ellian kept his justice and law portfolio.

=== House committee assignments ===
==== 2021–2023 term ====
- Credentials committee (chair)
- Committee for Defence
- Committee for European Affairs
- Committee for the Interior
- Committee for Justice and Security

==== 2023–present term ====
- Credentials committee (chair)
- Committee for Justice and Security
- Temporary committee Fundamental rights and constitutional review
- Committee for European Affairs
- Committee for Defence
- Committee for Asylum and Migration

== Personal life ==
Ellian is a resident of Almere. His partner, Lesley van Hilten, used to be an assistant of the CDA caucus in the Almere municipal council. She switched to the VVD in 2021 and became a municipal councilor two years later. They have a daughter, who was born in 2021, and Ellian also raises his partner's two sons.

== Electoral history ==
Electoral history of Ulysse Ellian
Year	Body	Party	Pos.	Votes	Result		Ref.
Year	Body	Party	Pos.	Votes	Party seats	Individual	Ref.
2021	House of Representatives	People's Party for Freedom and Democracy	22	1,931	34	Won	
2023	House of Representatives	People's Party for Freedom and Democracy	18	2,532	24	Won	
2025	House of Representatives	People's Party for Freedom and Democracy	13	3,033	22	Won	
