= Iran Prosperity Project =

Plan for the establishment of an Iranian transitional government

Iran Prosperity Project پروژه شکوفایی ایران
- Flag

- Logo
- Mission statement: "Lay out the path that can lead to a free, fair, and prosperous Iran and to show that the dreams millions have for a new Iran are not only attainable, but measurable"
- Location: (Free Iran) Iran
- Founder: National Union for Democracy in Iran
- Country: Iran
- Key people: Reza Pahlavi (leader); Saeed Ghasseminejad (director)
- Established: 30 April 2025; 18 months ago
- Website: www.iranprosperityproject.com/en

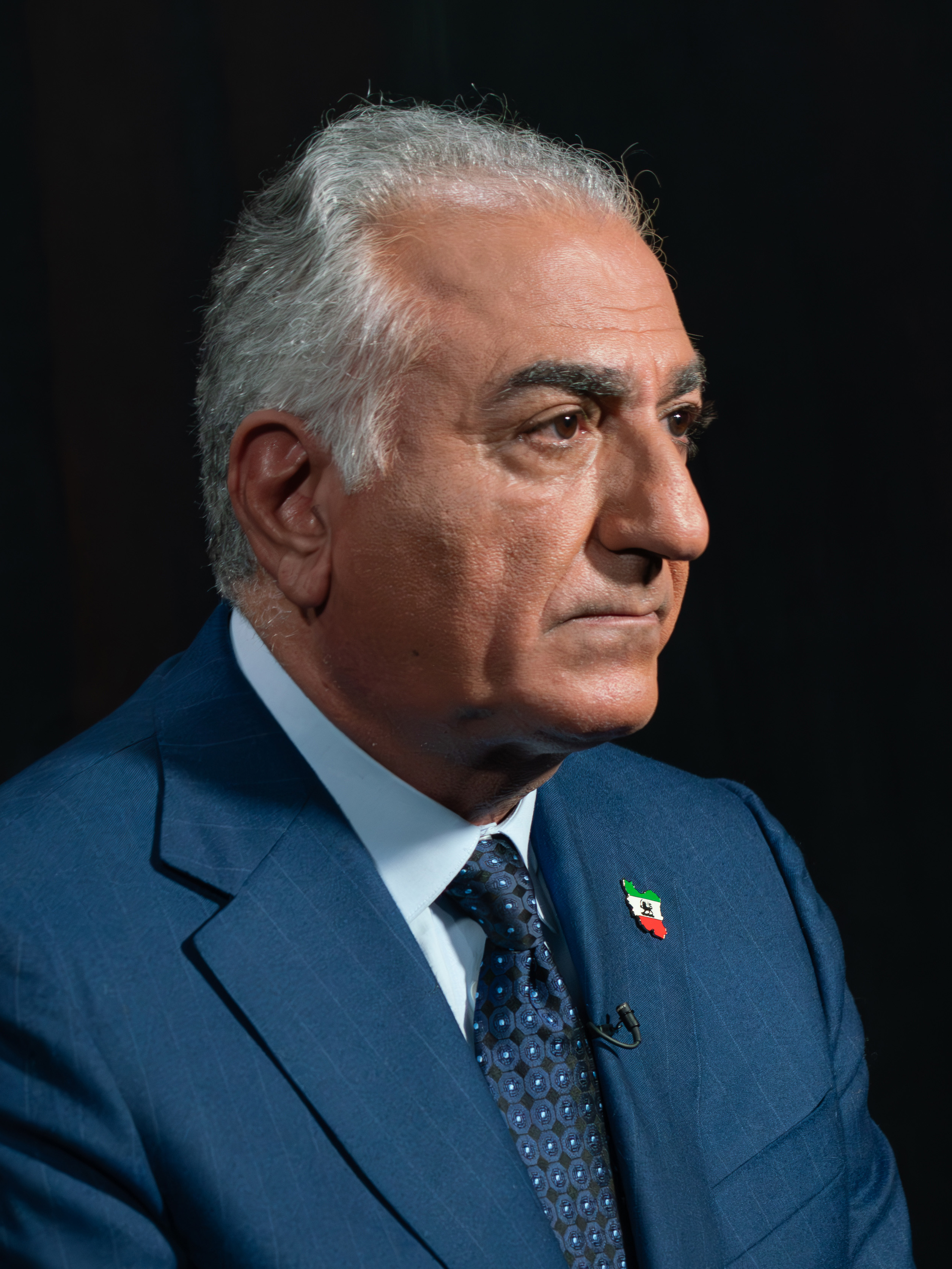
Iranian opposition leader Reza Pahlavi is aligned with Western allies and is ready to lead the transitional government to power once the Islamic Republic is overthrown.

The Iran Prosperity Project (IPP) (Persian: پروژه شکوفایی ایران, romanised: Prozhe-ye Shokufâyi-ye Irân) is a national political-economic plan put forth by the National Union for Democracy in Iran (NUFDI) preparing a transitional government to take over if the Islamic Republic is toppled. The plan is supported by opposition leader Reza Pahlavi, and aims to provide a viable path for Iran's future and support Iran's socioeconomic needs by focusing on economic stability for its citizens.

== History ==
On 30 April 2025, Reza Pahlavi officially launched the Iran Prosperity Project in Washington D.C. with presentations on various aspects of Iran's future economy, including healthcare, budget planning, and economic growth.

In July 2025, the National Union for Democracy in Iran released a booklet illustrating and expanding the "Emergency Phase" in the midst of the 2025 Iran internal crisis. This booklet focuses on key areas and offers extensive roadmaps on issues such as energy, industry, foreign policy, education, economy, healthcare.

In 2024, Pahlavi stated that the fall of the Islamic Republic would bring peace to the region and called for the West to end its policy of making deals with the government of Iran.

== Referendum ==
According to the timeline, there would be a new government, the future form of which would be either a constitutional monarchy or a full republic, to be decided in a fair referendum — in either case, the government would be secular and free democratic elections would be held.

== Transitional phases ==
The Iran Prosperity Project is structured into three phases, each with its own implementation timeline. The project defines "Transitional Period" to mean the time from the fall of the Islamic Republic to the time when a democratically elected government takes power.

=== Emergency Phase ===
The Emergency Phase is proposed to last 180 days.): The first six months of the Transitional Period focus on immediate stabilisation across fourteen policy areas: legal and political frameworks, military and security reform, foreign policy reorientation, government essential functions, macroeconomic governance, national asset recovery, energy, industry, cybersecurity, the environment, water, healthcare, and education. Governance during this phase falls under a unified Transitional System composed of three institutions—the Transitional Mehestan (the legislative branch), the Transitional Government (the executive branch), and the Transitional Divan (the judiciary)—operating under the leadership of Reza Pahlavi as Leader of the National Uprising. On 16 March 2026, Pahlavi appointed lawyer and Nobel Peace Prize laureate Shirin Ebadi, writer and human rights activist Iraj Mesdaghi, arbitration lawyer Leyla Bahmany, and legal scholar Afshin Ellian, as a committee to draft regulations for two institutions of transitional justice: a Transitional Justice Court and a Truth Commission.

The proposed legal framework adopts a hybrid option intermediate between retaining all laws of the Islamic Republic or restoring all laws of Pahlavi Iran. Under the hybrid option, Reza Pahlavi issues an official decree that: abolishes the Constitution of the Islamic Republic of Iran; retains existing laws and institutions as a default rule throughout the transitional period to ensure legal stability; and repeals those laws and dissolves those institutions in clear conflict with Iran's historical and national identity, the 1948 Universal Declaration of Human Rights, or the progress of the Transitional System. Bodies representing the Islamic Republic ideology, including the Islamic Revolutionary Guard Corps (IRGC) (including the Basij and the Quds Force) the Office of the Supreme Leader, the Guardian Council, and the Morality Police are dissolved, with vetted personnel and assets absorbed into reconstituted national institutions.

Within four months of the fall of the Islamic Republic, the Transitional Government is to hold a national referendum in which the Iranian people choose between a parliamentary monarchy and a republic as their future system of government; both ballot options enshrine seven inviolable constitutional principles, including secularism, the rule of law, individual rights grounded in the Cyrus Cylinder, democracy, separation of powers, judicial independence, and Iran's territorial integrity. Within two months of receiving the referendum results, the Transitional Government holds an election for a constituent assembly.

=== Stabilisation Phase ===
The Stabilisation Phase is proposed from month seven through to the end of the Transitional Period. Following the Emergency Phase referendum on the democratic regime type and election of the constituent assembly, the assembly drafts a new constitution within six months based on the chosen system of government. A constitutional referendum follows; upon approval, elections are held for the permanent Mehestan (parliament), and, if a republican system was chosen, a presidential election is held simultaneously. The overall Transitional Period is expected to last between 18 and 24 months, with limited extensions permitted under defined conditions requiring joint approval by the heads of all three transitional institutions and, for extensions beyond 12 months, a national referendum.

=== Post-Transition Long-Term Reforms Phase ===
The Post-Transition Long-Term Reforms Phase is proposed to begin with the formation of the first elected government. Once a democratically elected government assumes office, the transitional institutions are dissolved and responsibility for comprehensive legal modernisation, institutional development, and long-term economic and social reform passes to the elected Mehestan and government. This phase is intended to position Iran as a stable, open-market economy integrated into the global economy, capable of attracting foreign direct investment and rebuilding civil society.

== Criticism ==
In September 2024, Majid Mohammadi argued that a 10-point summary of the economic plans in the project needed further refinement and expansion to address key aspects of Iran's political economy, such as the role of state-owned banks and companies, resource allocation, and subsidies.

== See also ==
- 2025–2026 Iran–United States negotiations
- 2025–26 Iranian budget
- 2026 Iranian supreme leader election
- Iranian opposition
- Federalism in Iran
- Pahlavism
