= Noor Pahlavi =

Daughter of Reza Pahlavi (born 1992)

Noor Zahra Pahlavi
- Noor Pahlavi (center) with her father Reza Pahlavi (2025)
- Born: Noor Zahra Pahlavi; April 3, 1992 (age 34); Washington, D.C., United States
- House: Pahlavi
- Father: Reza Pahlavi
- Mother: Yasmine Pahlavi

Noor Zahra Pahlavi (Persian: نورالزهرا پهلوی; born April 3, 1992) is an lranian-American businesswoman, political activist and socialite who is the disputed (Note: Reza Pahlavi has declared Noor as his heir. However, the Persian Constitution of 1906 specifically provided that only a male could become the heir, with the current candidate being Patrick Ali Pahlavi.) heir apparent to the headship of the deposed Pahlavi dynasty since 2011. She is the eldest daughter of the exiled crown prince Reza Pahlavi and the granddaughter of Mohammad Reza Pahlavi, the last shah of Iran who was overthrown in the Iranian Revolution in 1979.

== Early life and education ==
Noor Pahlavi was born in Washington, D.C., on April 3, 1992, to Reza Pahlavi and Yasmine Pahlavi (née Etemad-Amini). Her father has declared her as his heir, emphasizing his belief "in the inherent equal rights between men and women". She attended Bullis School in Maryland before graduating from Georgetown University in 2014, where she obtained a degree in psychology. She attained an MBA from the Columbia Business School in 2020.

== Career ==
In 2017, Pahlavi was a director of fundraising and investor relations at a commercial real estate firm. By 2020, she became an advisory board member for the patient capital non-profit investment fund Acumen. In 2022, she started work for the strategic communications consultancy firm Argot Partners, becoming partner in 2024. She is also a principal at the venture capital firm Sofreh Capital, founded by Shervin Pishevar.

Pahlavi has been involved with the Phoenix Project of Iran, a think tank launched by her father in 2019. She has expressed support for the Iran Prosperity Project, in which her father plays a leading role, and offered a vision of Iran "where Persian culture is celebrated rather than washed away … [and] where citizens can love who they want, practice whatever religion they want". In October 2024, she appeared on Jay Ruderman's "All About Change" podcast.

She has also been involved in the activities of the National Union for Democracy in Iran, and took part in the Munich-based convention of the National Cooperation to Save Iran in July, 2025, alongside her father.

Pahlavi is a contributor to Medium.com, where she discusses political issues in both English and Persian. Her opinion pieces have been published by the Saudi news channel Al Arabiya and the Saudi royal family-owned newspaper Asharq Al-Aswat. She has also worked as a model, appearing on the covers of Harper's Bazaar Arabia and Cosmopolitan Indonesia. She has credited her grandmother Farah Pahlavi for helping her develop close relationships with leading fashion designers.

== Personal life and advocacy ==
Pahlavi has advocated for gender equality, and criticized the Iranian government following the death of Mahsa Amini. She has fundraised for Keshet, an organization promoting LGBTQ+ rights in the American Jewish community. Pahlavi and her family live in the United States.
