= Zabih Etemadi =

Iranian-Dutch footballer (born 1982)

Personal information
- Full name: Zabih Etemadi
- Date of birth: September 19, 1982 (age 44)
- Place of birth: Tehran, Iran
- Height: 1.78 m (5 ft 10 in)
- Positions: Defender; midfielder

Youth career
- 1998–2000: SC Heerenveen

Senior career*
Years	Team	Apps	(Gls)
2001–2004	SC Cambuur Leeuwarden	10	(0)
2004–2005	FC Groningen		
2005–2006	FC Wolvega		
2006–2009	SC Joure		
2009–2010	PKC'83		
2010–2011	WKE		
2011–2012	Drachtster Boys		
- * Club domestic league appearances and goals as of 19 September 2009

Zabih Etemadi (born 19 September 1982) is an Iranian former professional footballer living in the Netherlands. He currently works as a lawyer and sports agent and owns a sports management company. He holds Dutch citizenship and is the older brother of Agil Etemadi.

== Biography ==
Zabih Etemadi was born in Tehran (Iran) and grew up in Dubai. His family moved to The Netherlands when he was 10 years old.

== Professional football player ==
On his 15th Etemadi was scouted by SC Heerenveen. In 2001, he made his debut as a professional football player in the Dutch second division for Cambuur Leeuwarden, where he played as a back for three years. In 2004, he signed a contract with FC Groningen in the Dutch premier league. Etemadi retired from professional football in 2005 due to a knee injury. From 2005 until 2012 he played for several amateur clubs.

== Lawyer ==
After his retirement Etemadi studied law at the Rijksuniversiteit Groningen. In 2009, he received his master's degree in business law. After working for a commercial law firm for 5 years, Etemadi started his own law firm in Amsterdam in 2015. Together with Floris Havelaar he founded law firm LOYR in 2016.

As a lawyer Etemadi specializes in dispute resolution in the field of company and contractual law. He is also a member of a practice group concerned with sports law, where he advises and litigates on behalf of national and international clients. He is also a member of the Dutch Association of Sports Law (Vereniging voor Sport en Recht). In an interview with the alumni magazine of his university, Etemadi stated, "I'm hoping to become the football lawyer in The Netherlands."

== Sports agent ==
In 2010 Etemadi founded sports management company Soccer Linked Services, where he served as an agent for professional football players. In 2015, he formed a joint venture to formSportLife Management, offering career planning, talent development and legal support for football players, athletes and managers. The football players they have under contract include Johnatan Opoku and Martijn Barto.

== Football coach ==
Etemadi received his UEFA-B coaching degree in 2008. He has coached an under-15 youth team of amateur football club of SC Joure, which was promoted to the 3rd division. In July 2008 he was successful at the International Children's Games in San Francisco.

== Football related activities ==
Zabih Etemadi is a member of the Dutch think tank Voetbal en Recht (football and law), affiliated with the University of Amsterdam, which discusses legal issues related to football. He is also a board member of Favela United, a foundation that helps underprivileged children in Brasil and Mozambique through football. He currently plays for the Dutch national lawyers football team. Because of his Iranian background Etemadi is often consulted by football clubs looking for Iranian players. He is also invited by Dutch media to speak about Iranian football.

== Club career ==
- 2012–2017 WV-HEDW
- 2011–2012 Drachtster Boys
- 2010–2011 WKE
- 2009–2010 PKC'83
- 2006–2009 SC Joure
- 2005–2006 FC Wolvega
- 2004–2005 FC Groningen
- 2001–2004 SC Cambuur Leeuwarden
- 1998–2000 SC Heerenveen
