= Yasmine Pahlavi =

Iranian attorney and wife of Reza Pahlavi (born 1968)

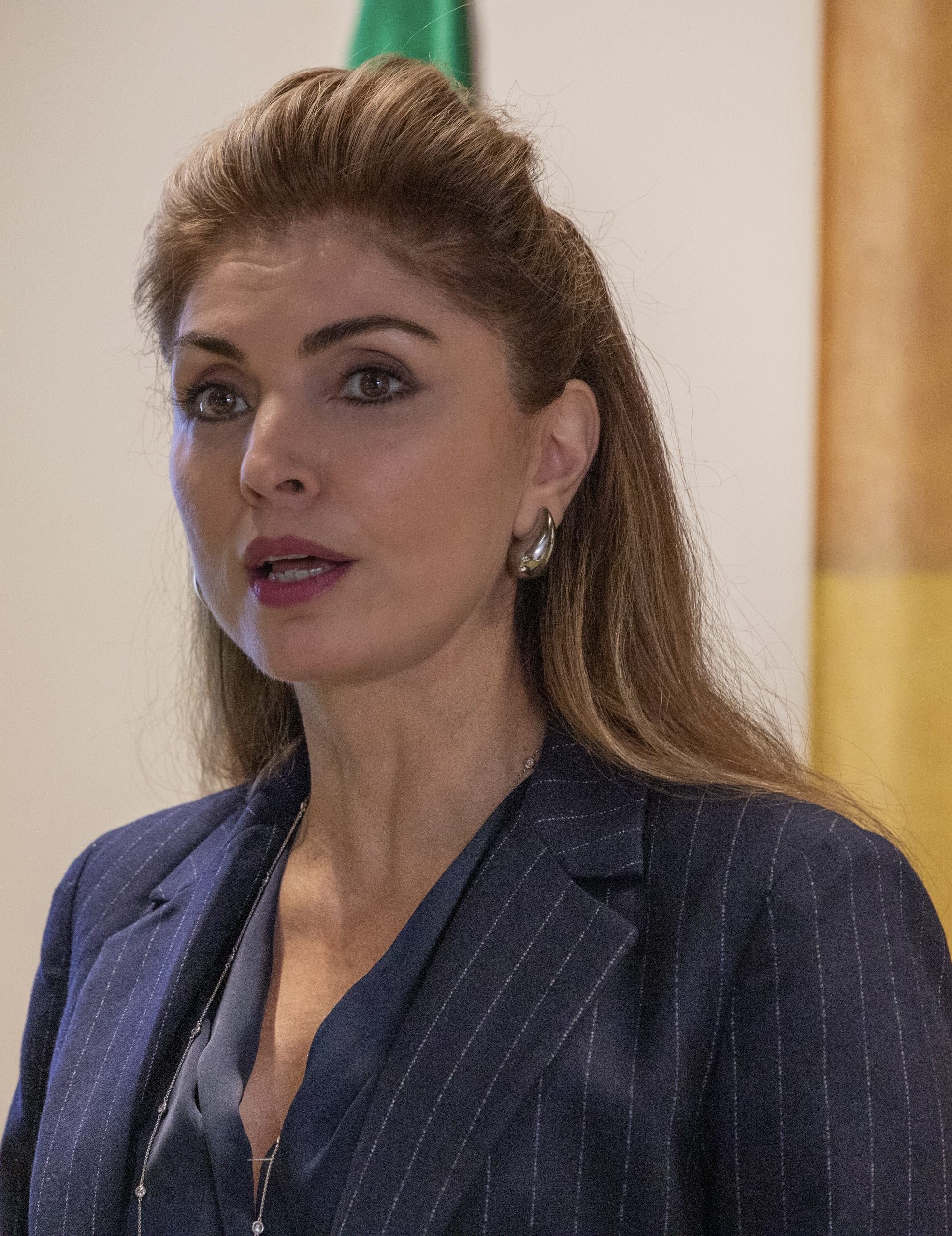
- Pahlavi in 2023
- Born: Yasmine Etemad-Amini; July 26, 1968 (age 58); Tehran, Imperial State of Iran
- Spouse: Reza Pahlavi (m. 1986)
- Issue: Noor Pahlavi; Iman Pahlavi; Farah Pahlavi
- House: Pahlavi (by marriage)
- Father: Abdollah Etemad-Amini
- Mother: Forough Eftekhari

Yasmine Pahlavi (Persian: یاسمین پهلوی, née Etemad-Amini, Persian: اعتماد امینی; born July 26, 1968) is an Iranian attorney who is the wife of Reza Pahlavi, the former crown prince of the Imperial State of Iran.

== Biography ==
Yasmine Etemad-Amini was born in Pars Hospital in Tehran in the Imperial State of Iran on July 26, 1968, to Iranian businessman and leading member of the Constitutionalist Party of Iran Abdollah Etemad-Amini and his wife Forough Eftekhari. She attended the private Tehran Community School until the Islamic revolution forced her family to leave Iran permanently. They settled in the San Francisco area of California, where she attended Notre Dame High School.

She enrolled at George Washington University in the late 1980s and, according to her family's published biography, earned a Bachelor of Arts in political science in 1990 and a Juris Doctor from its Law School in 1998. She was admitted to the Bar of Maryland that same year; as of 2026 her status with the Maryland Judiciary is listed as inactive/retired.

She worked for ten years as a staff attorney for Children's Law Center in Washington, D.C., representing the rights of at-risk and underprivileged youth. She was also the co-founder and a director of the Foundation for the Children of Iran. Founded in 1991, the purpose of the Foundation is to provide health care services to Iranian children or children of Iranian origin regardless of race, color, creed, religious or political affiliation. She resigned from her leadership role and any affiliation with the Foundation in February 2014. In November 2018, she announced that she had breast cancer.

== Marriage and children ==
Yasmine married Reza Pahlavi on June 12, 1986 when he was 25 and she was just 17, in Greenwich, Connecticut. The couple have three daughters: Noor Zahra, Iman Laya, and Farah Mitra. Pahlavi and her family live in the United States.

Titles in pretence
Preceded by Farah Pahlavi	— TITULAR — Empress consort of Iran; 1986–present Reason for succession failure: Monarchy abolished in 1979	Incumbent
