= Reza Pahlavi =

Former Crown Prince of Iran (born 1960)

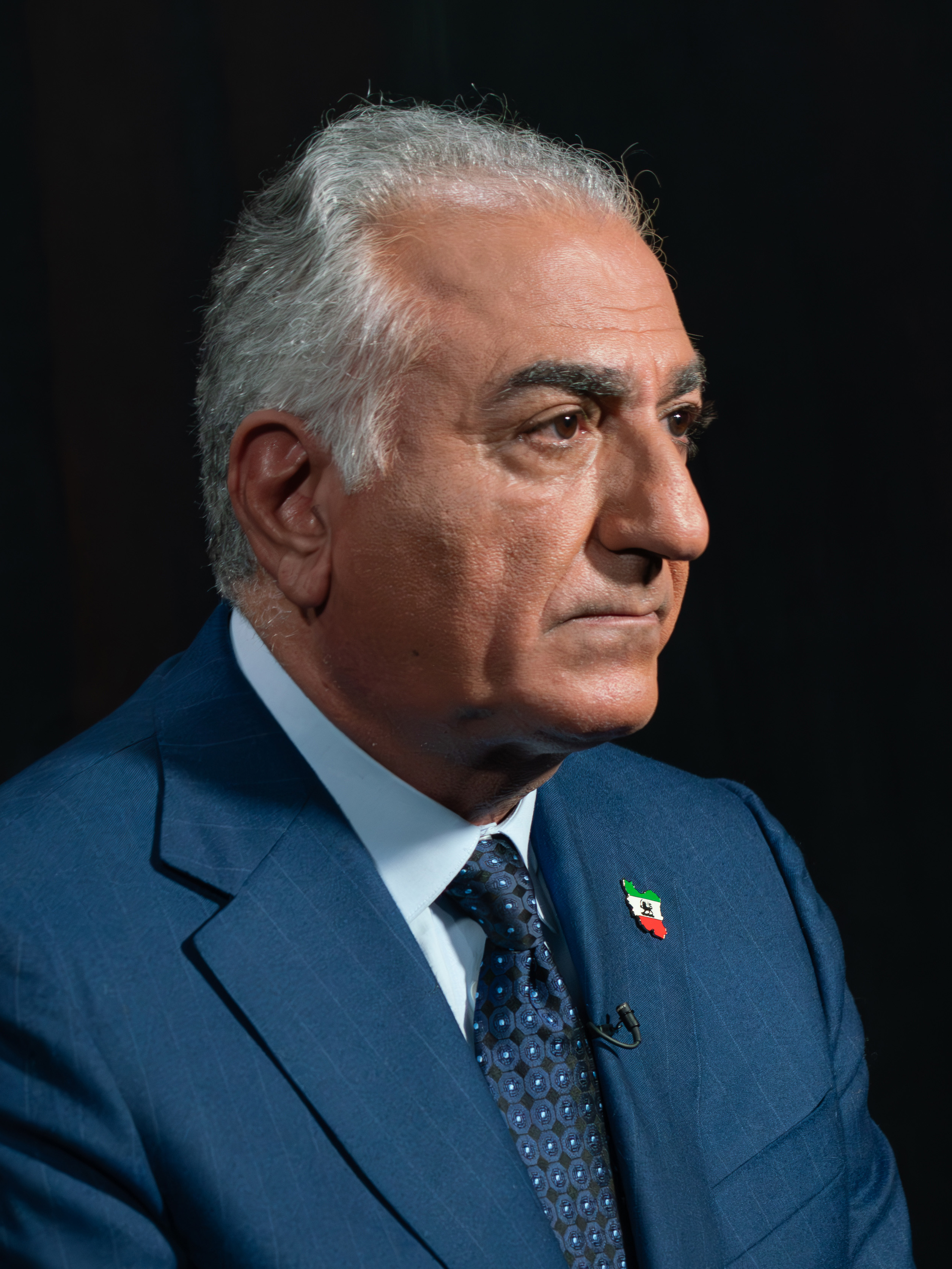
- Pahlavi in 2024

Head of the House of Pahlavi
- Tenure: 31 October 1980 – present
- Predecessor: Mohammad Reza Pahlavi (Note: Farah Diba served as regent between Mohammad Reza's death and Reza's proclamation as Shah)
- Heir apparent/presumptive: Disputed (Note: The Persian Constitution of 1906 specifically provided that only a male could become the heir, with the current candidate being Patrick Ali Pahlavi. However, Pahlavi has declared his eldest daughter, Noor Pahlavi, as his heir.)

Crown Prince of Iran
- Tenure: October 31, 1960 – 11 February 1979 / 31 October 1980
- Predecessor: Mohammad Reza Pahlavi (1926 – 1941)
- Successor: Monarchy abolished
- Born: 31 October 1960 (age 66); Tehran, Imperial State of Iran
- Spouse: Yasmine Etemad-Amini (m. 1986)
- Issue: Noor Pahlavi; Iman Pahlavi; Farah Pahlavi
Names
- Reza Pahlavi رضا پهلوی (Persian)
- House: Pahlavi
- Father: Mohammad Reza Pahlavi
- Mother: Farah Diba
- Party: Iran National Council (2013–2017)
- Alma mater: Williams College; American University in Cairo; University of Southern California (BS)
- Website: rezapahlavi.org

Reza Pahlavi (Note: /ˈreɪzə ˈpɑːləˌvi/ RAY-zə PAH-lə-VEE; Persian: رضا پهلوی, romanized: Rezâ Pahlavi [ɾeˈzɒː pʰæhlæˈviː]) (born 31 October 1960) is an Iranian political activist and the former Crown Prince of Iran. He is the eldest son of Mohammad Reza Pahlavi, the last Pahlavi Shah of Iran, and his wife, Empress Farah. He lives in the United States as a dissident in exile.

Born in Tehran, Reza Pahlavi was officially designated Crown Prince of Iran during his father's coronation in 1967. As a cadet in the Imperial Iranian Air Force, he moved to the United States to undergo pilot training at Reese Air Force Base in 1978. The following year, his father left Iran and the monarchy was abolished during the Islamic Revolution led by Ruhollah Khomeini. In 1980, following the death of his father in exile in Cairo, Pahlavi declared himself Shah of Iran, adopting the title "Reza Shah II", and became active in political opposition to the Islamic Republic from abroad. In 2025, he co-founded Iran Prosperity Project, a plan for the establishment of an Iranian transitional government.

Pahlavi has advocated holding a nationwide referendum to determine the country's future system of government, where voters will choose between a secular republic or a constitutional monarchy. Pahlavi has urged Iranians to protest against the Islamic Republic and has called for the overthrow of the current regime. Though advocating for Iran to form closer ties with the Western world and Israel, he says that a democratic Iran would not be antagonistic to Russia or China's interests. While many Iranians have voiced support for Pahlavi, several Western analysts question his relevancy.

He has been described as a prominent opposition figure during the 2025–2026 Iranian protests, having called for civilians to protest on 8 and 9 January which saw upwards of several millions of Iranians take to the streets. In February 2026, Pahlavi announced a "global day of action", calling for Iranians abroad to rally across several major Western cities; estimates suggest that the total number of ralliers may have exceeded one million. However, some outlets also describe him as a polarizing figure, with critics pointing out his alleged reliance on foreign backing. Pahlavi has met with several world leaders, including, Volodymyr Zelenskyy, Benjamin Netanyahu, and Marco Rubio among others. He and his family reside in a suburb of Washington, D.C., in the United States.

== Early life and education ==
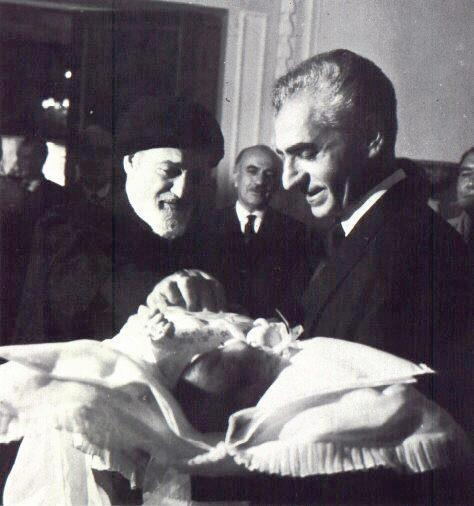
Reza (center, foreground) with his father Mohammad Reza Pahlavi (right) and Tehran's Friday Prayer Imam Hassan Emami (left)

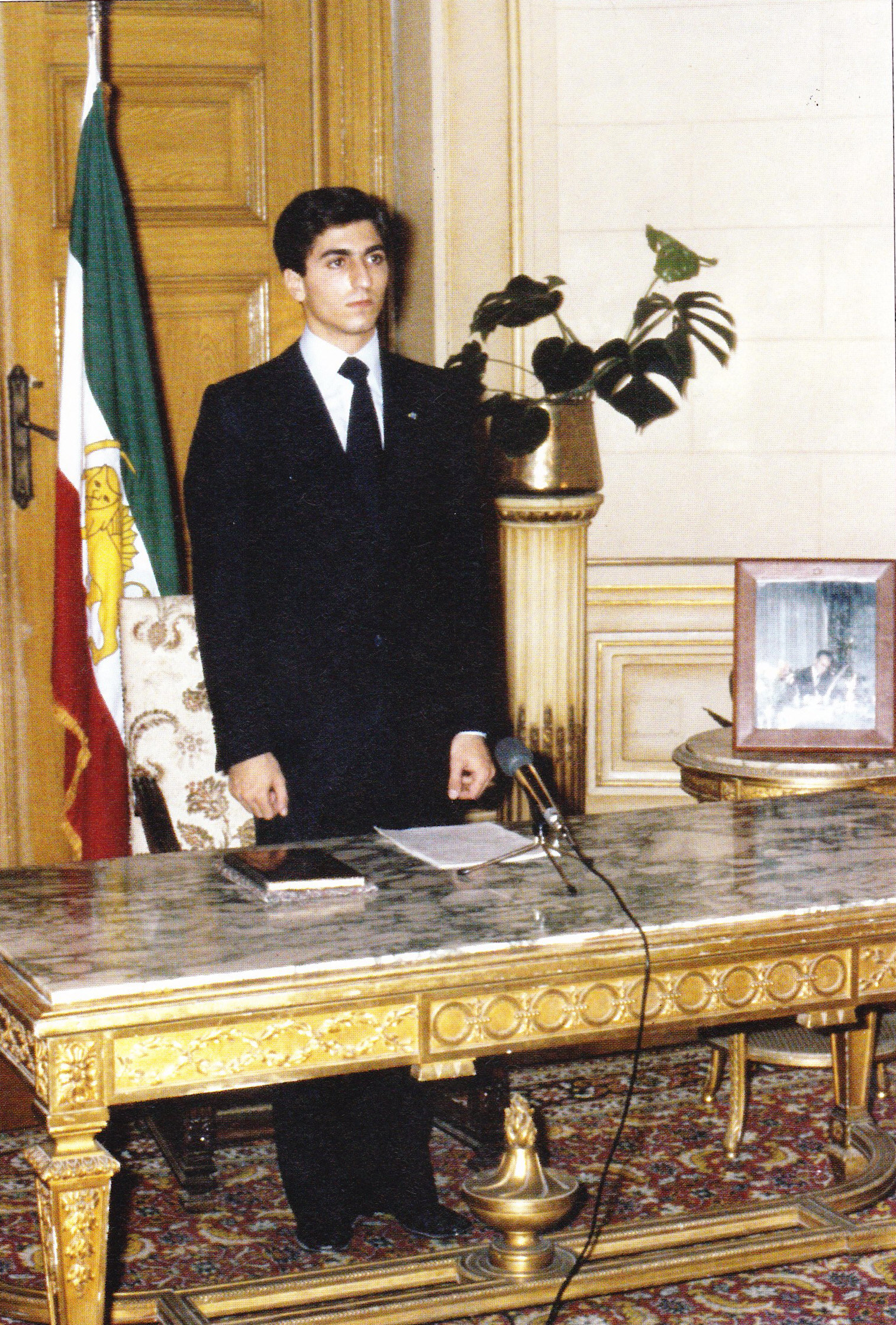
Reza Pahlavi's swearing in as the new shah of Iran on 31 October 1980 at Koubbeh Palace, Cairo

Reza Pahlavi was born in Tehran as the eldest son of Mohammad Reza Pahlavi, the Shah of Iran and Farah Pahlavi, the Shahbanu. Pahlavi's siblings include his sister Farahnaz, brother Ali Reza, and sister Leila, as well as a half-sister, Shahnaz. When he was born, the Shah pardoned 98 political prisoners, and the government declared a 20 percent reduction in income tax.

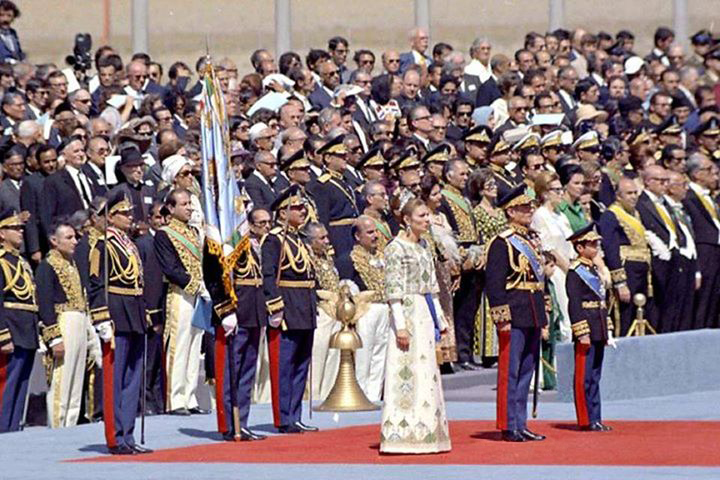
A ceremony at Pasargadae to mark the 2,500-year celebration of the Persian Empire in 1971. The Crown Prince is at the far right, age 10, standing next to his parents.

In his youth, he was a keen football player and spectator. He was a fan of the capital's football club Esteghlal, then known as Tāj (lit. 'Crown'), and his support was even televised by the National Iranian Radio and Television. The club participated in annual rallies organized on his birthday, identifying the club with the Pahlavi regime. He was also a supporter of Taj Abadan football club, another Iranian football team of the era.

=== Pilot training ===
He studied at the eponymous "Reza Pahlavi School," a private school located in the royal palace and restricted to the imperial family and court associates. He was trained as a pilot; his first solo flight was at the age of 11, and he obtained his license a year later.

As a cadet of the Imperial Iranian Air Force, he was sent to the United States in August 1978 to continue his pilot training. He was one of 43 cadet pilots in the one-year pilot training program at the Reese Air Force Base near Lubbock, Texas, which included flying the Cessna T-37 Tweet and Northrop T-38 Talon. As a result of the Iranian Revolution, he left the base in March 1979, about four months earlier than planned. He then joined his family in their travels, under tight security, from Morocco to the Bahamas to Mexico.

=== Higher education ===
Pahlavi began studies at Williams College in September 1979, but dropped out in 1980. He then enrolled at The American University in Cairo as a political science student, but his attendance was irregular. In 1981, he had reportedly dropped out of the program and continued his studies privately with Iranian professors, with a focus on Persian culture and history, philosophy, and oil in Iran.

While living in Morocco, Pahlavi obtained a B.S. in political science by correspondence from the University of Southern California in 1985. He is fluent in English and French in addition to his native Persian.

=== Succession ===
Reza Pahlavi is first in the line of succession to his late father. His younger brother Ali-Reza was second in line until his death by suicide in 2011. Before Reza Pahlavi's birth, the presumptive heir was Patrick Ali Pahlavi, the crown prince's cousin. On his website, Pahlavi has declared his eldest daughter, Noor Pahlavi as his heir, emphasizing his belief "in the inherent equal rights between men and women".

== Political activities in exile ==
=== 1980s ===
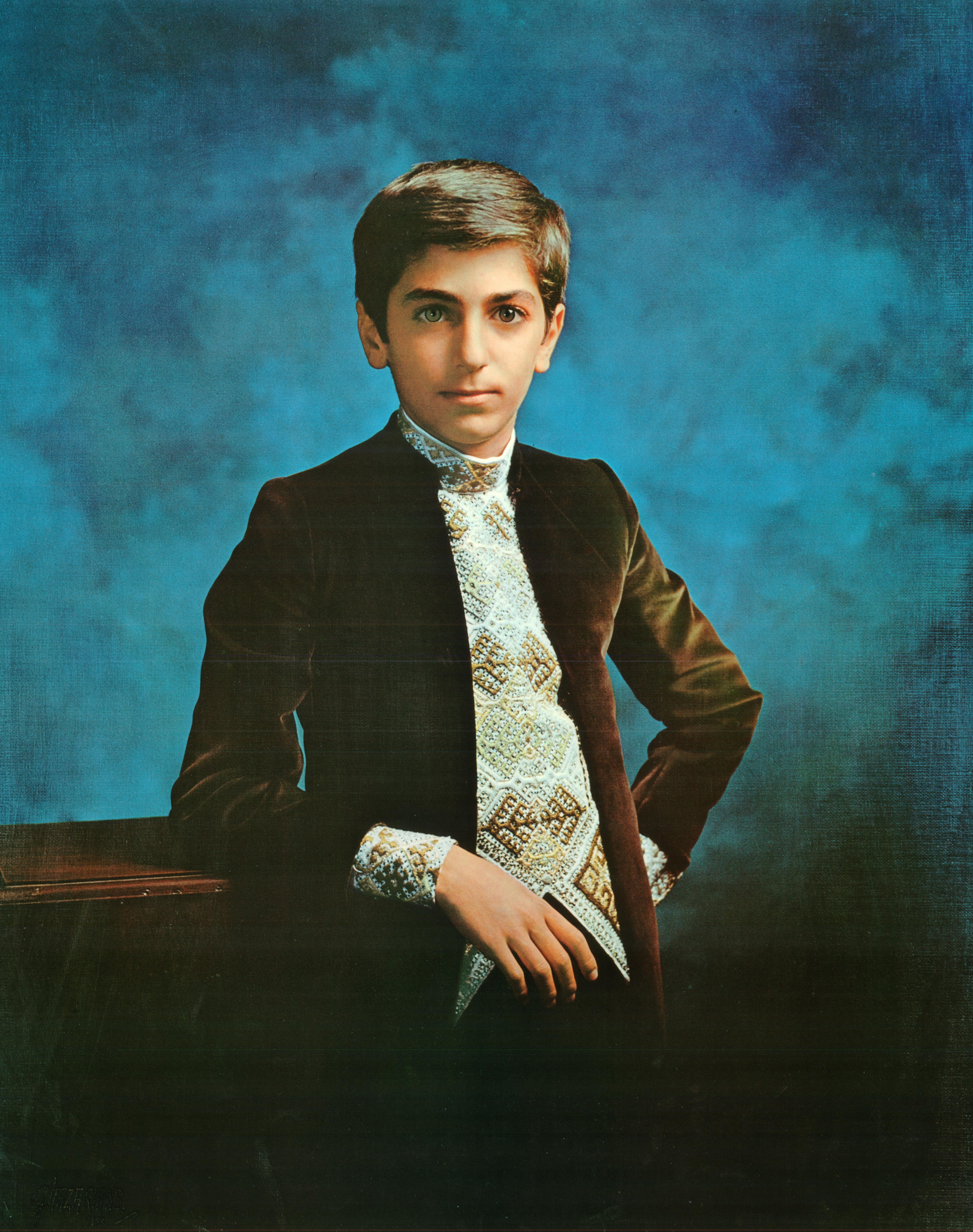
Official portrait of Reza Pahlavi as Crown Prince of Iran in 1973

Reza Pahlavi came to Cairo, Egypt, in March 1980 with his family. When his father Mohammad Reza Pahlavi was ill and in the last weeks of his life, media reported that some monarchist elements had advised the Shah to oust Reza in favor of his younger son, Ali Reza (who was 13 at the time) and a regency council, suggesting that Reza's background, training and interest in public affairs were too limited to become his successor. The Shah was understood to have rejected the idea and abdicated in favor of one of his two sons.

When the Shah died on 27 July 1980, Farah Pahlavi proclaimed herself as regent, a title of pretense. On his 20th birthday on 31 October, Reza Pahlavi declared himself to be the new king of Iran, Reza Shah II, and the rightful successor to the throne of the Pahlavi dynasty. Immediately afterward a spokesman for the United States Department of State, John Trattner, disassociated the U.S. government from Reza Pahlavi by stating that the U.S. government did not intend to support Pahlavi, and assuring that the U.S. government recognized the newly established post-revolutionary Iranian government.

In 1981, Pahlavi remained in the Koubbeh Palace and developed close ties to pro-monarchy groups while facing rejection from other opposition groups, including left-wing dissidents. In March, he issued a statement for the Persian New Year. He urged all opponents of the Iranian government to unite behind him and wage a "national resistance." Still, he chose to remain silent and made no reaction when President Abolhassan Banisadr was deposed, and the assassination of tens of officials including Chief Justice Mohammad Beheshti took place in June.

In August, Pahlavi announced that he had been secretly planning to overthrow the Iranian government, stating, "So far I have been unwilling to unveil the existence of the concerted plans for I do not wish to jeopardize the lives of some of our best children... many of our actions have been unknown to you, but I want to assure you that the necessary steps are being taken in the best orderly way to save Iran".

In 1982, Yaakov Nimrodi told the BBC in a radio interview that, along with Adolph Schwimmer and Adnan Khashoggi, he was involved with Pahlavi and Gen. Said Razvani to scheme a coup d'état and install Pahlavi in Iran. According to Samuel Segev, the plan had the approval of both the CIA and the Israeli cabinet, but it was abandoned when Israeli Prime Minister Menachem Begin resigned in 1983 and the new leadership under Yitzhak Shamir "thought Israel should not be involved in a new adventure".

In May 1986, Pahlavi disclosed that he had recently formed a government-in-exile to establish a constitutional monarchy again in Iran. In February 1989, he delivered an invited talk at Georgetown University's Walsh School of Foreign Service. His political support base at the time was limited to upper-class Iranian Americans, and he raised $1 million to finance his political activities over two months in the spring of 1989. He moved in a narrow circle of exiled government officials and academics, guarded by aides like his childhood bodyguard Ahmad Oveyssi.

=== 21st century ===
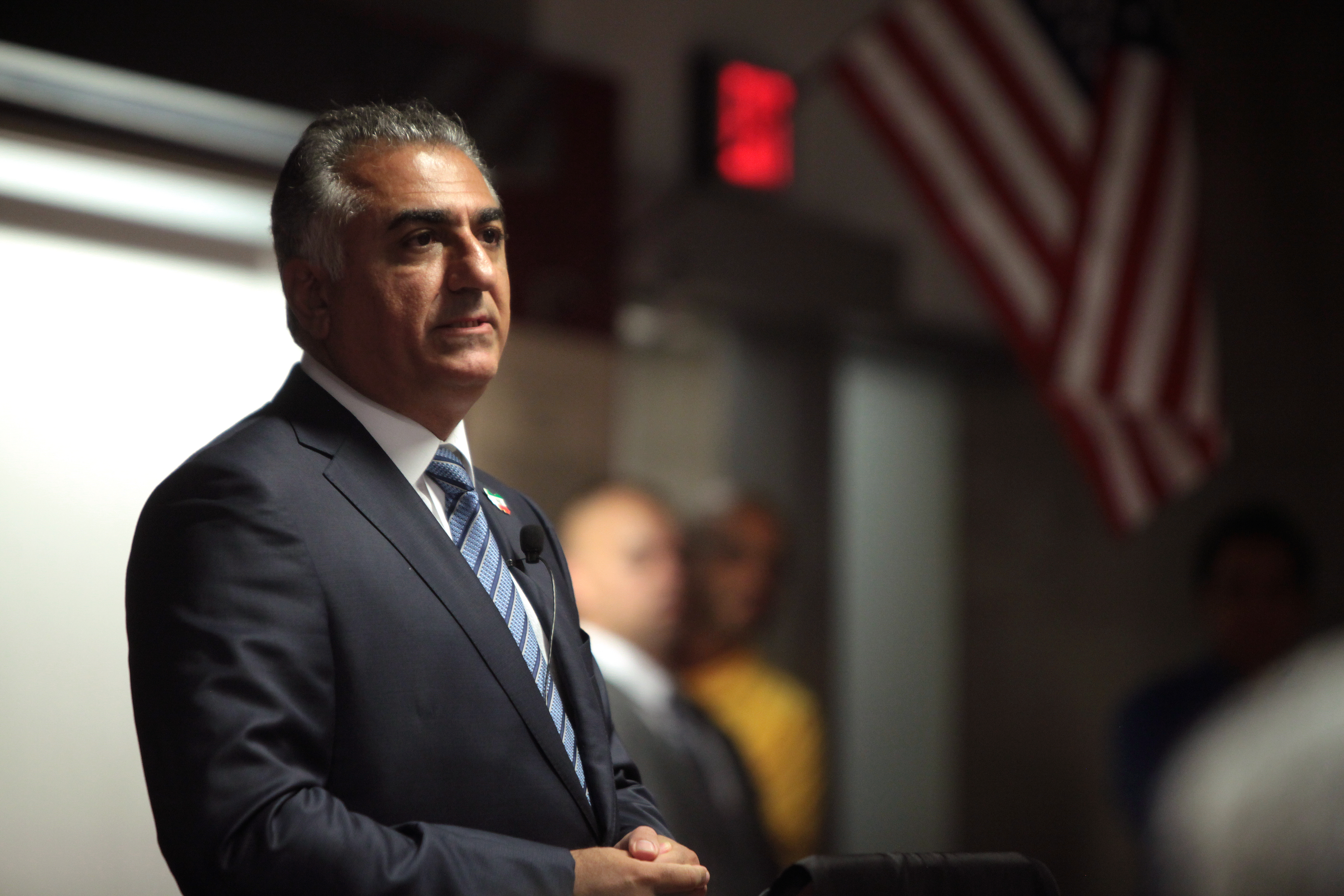
Reza Pahlavi at an event in 2015 in Tempe, Arizona.

Pahlavi has used his high profile as an Iranian abroad to campaign for human rights, democracy, and unity among Iranians in and outside Iran. On his website, he calls for a separation of religion and state in Iran and free and fair elections "for all freedom-loving individuals and political ideologies." He exhorts all groups dedicated to a democratic agenda to work together for a democratic and secular Iranian government.

In a presentation at the Washington Institute for Near East Policy in December 2018, Pahlavi called for the non-military support of those in Iran who were trying to replace the Islamist regime with a secular democracy. According to a news report, he was "not openly calling for the restoration of the Peacock Throne to Iran ... He casts himself more as a symbol than a politician but has called himself 'ready to serve my country'".

In November 2014, Pahlavi founded his own television and radio network called Ofogh Iran. In July 2017 it was reported that the Ofogh Iran International Media telethon no longer belonged to Pahlavi.

In February 2019, Reza Pahlavi launched the Phoenix Project of Iran think tank in Washington, D.C., based on the short-lived Iran Future Association, which he initiated in Toronto in 2008. According to the National Interest, this is "designed to bring the various strains of the opposition closer to a common vision for a post-clerical Iran".

In July 2026, Reuters reported that Pahlavi faced criticism for failing to unite Iran's fragmented opposition, with activists blaming divisions within his inner circle. The investigation also documented multiple incidents in Europe in which some of his supporters were accused of assaulting or harassing critics, journalists and business owners. Reuters further reported that some major donors became dissatisfied with his leadership and ceased financial support, while several analysts argued that he lacked a broad political movement inside Iran. The report also stated that the Trump administration declined to endorse Pahlavi as a future Iranian leader and that some supporters criticized his restrained response to President Donald Trump's wartime rhetoric toward Iran.

=== Support within Iran ===
While Pahlavi has long presented himself as an alternative to Iran's ruling clerics, opinions about him remain deeply divided, with many Iranians still associating his family with the Shah's authoritarian rule. A report published by the Brookings Institution in 2009 said that Pahlavi lacked an organized following within Iran since there was no serious monarchist movement in Iran itself. The report described Pahlavi as having "little in common with the intellectuals and students who make up the core of the reform movement".

During the 2017–18 Iranian protests, some videos on social media showed demonstrators chanting slogans in favor of Pahlavi's grandfather and calling for his return. On many occasions the videos indicated the royalist slogans prompted others in the crowd to shout the slogans down.

In January 2023, New York-based Iranian scholar and writer Arash Azizi noted that among younger Iranians on social media and at public demonstrations, support for Pahlavi has become more visible and argued, "To any fair observer of Iran, Pahlavi has a certain degree of support in Iranian society, although it is hard to discern just how wide this support is." He also noted that a number of Iranian dissident activists and celebrities, including Dariush Eghbali (who had been imprisoned under the Shah's rule), actress Shohreh Aghdashloo, actor Hamid Farrokhnezhad and Olympian Kimia Alizadeh have come out in support of Pahlavi being a figurehead to unite anti-regime movements.

The University of Navarra, a private Spanish Catholic research university founded by Opus Dei, published an article in 2023 in which they found there was support for Pahlavi within Iran. In 2023, an online poll conducted by the Berlin-based pro-Pahlavi (Note: In January 2026, ERF.I posted an open letter to Pahlavi on Twitter, in which they asked him to "lead the transition" in Iran and declared their "readiness to support" him.) Empirical Research and Forecasting Institute (ERF.I, established by Taghi Alereza, Houshang Lahooti and Noah Farhadi), with the help of machine learning, found that among the 9,000 respondents, almost 80 percent preferred Pahlavi to the current Islamic Republic leadership. The ERF.I poll result was cited by the conservative American think-tank Middle East Forum as an argument against "hesitation" in American government circles over backing efforts to restore the Iranian monarchy.

=== Support among Iranian expatriates ===
In 2006, Connie Bruck of The New Yorker wrote that Los Angeles is home to about 600,000 Iranian expatriates and said it was a monarchist stronghold.

A 2013 survey of Iranian-Americans conducted by George Mason University's Center for Social Science Research found that 85% of respondents did not support any Iranian opposition groups or figures. Of the remaining 15% who expressed support, 20% backed Pahlavi.

=== 2022–23 ===
During anti-government demonstrations in Iran in 2022 following the Abadan building collapse, Pahlavi predicted that the Islamic regime would collapse in the near future as events such as the shooting down of Ukraine International Airlines Flight 752, bans on importing foreign COVID-19 vaccines and tests into the country, and rising food prices had led to unnecessary deaths and would provoke further anger at government mismanagement from the population. He also urged members of the Iranian armed forces who oppose the Islamic Republic but work for the government to engage in peaceful disruption and called for a coordinated front against the regime.

In a February 2023 interview with The Daily Telegraph, Pahlavi called on the British and European governments to proscribe the Islamic Revolutionary Guard Corps (IRGC), arguing such a move would be "pulling out the biggest tooth the regime has." In the interview, he also argued his belief that the Islamic Republic was more likely to fall in the near future than it had been in previous decades, as Iranian reformists had switched tactics to wanting to completely overthrow the regime as opposed to changing it.

Pahlavi also predicted that the greatest challenge for a new secular, liberal democratic Iran would be the question of controlling the military and seeking justice against officials in the regime. He concluded that higher-ranking members of the Islamic regime would face trials for human rights abuses, but lower-ranking members could be pardoned to allow reintegration into society, citing the Nuremberg trials in which top Nazi officials were prosecuted while lower-ranking members were reintegrated back into Germany, and the Truth and Reconciliation Commission hearings in South Africa after the end of apartheid as examples to follow.

In March 2023, Pahlavi embarked on a tour of the United Kingdom and gave a speech to the Oxford Union. During the speech, he argued that "secular[ism] is a prerequisite to democracy" and that Islamic regimes fail by not accepting freedom of religion. He called for the right to Internet access to be restored to Iran to help communication between dissident movements and for non-violent tactics to be used in bringing down the Iranian regime. During the speech, a large demonstration in support of Pahlavi took place outside, calling for his restoration.

On 17 April 2023, he and his wife, Yasmine, visited Israel in "an effort to rebuild the historic relations between Iran and Israel". Upon his arrival in Israel, he visited the Western Wall and Yad Vashem on the occasion of Yom HaShoah and met with President of Israel Isaac Herzog and Prime Minister of Israel Benjamin Netanyahu. He also paid a condolence call to the bereaved Dee family at their home in the West Bank settlement of Efrat, after the deaths of sisters Maia and Rina and their mother, Lucy, in a terror shooting during the Passover holiday.

=== Support during the Mahsa Amini protests ===
In a recent attempt in 2023 to garner support for Reza Pahlavi as a representative for transition, a petition was created on the platform Change.org that has amassed over 460,000 signatures.

Reza Pahlavi asked Iranians worldwide to protest against the Islamic Republic on its 44th anniversary, 11 February 2023. As a result, people rallied in multiple cities in the US, Europe, Australia, and Canada. Reza Pahlavi himself participated in a rally in Los Angeles attended by a crowd of more than 80,000 people.

=== 2024–25 ===
In July 2024, Pahlavi was invited to speak at the National Conservatism Conference in Washington, D.C. In his speech, Pahlavi blamed the Iranian regime for the spread of radical Islam to other nations in the Middle East and the West following the revolution and promised that Iranians will take Iran back in the near future. He also argued that Masoud Pezeshkian was not a "moderate" politician due to his friendship with Hezbollah. He warned the United States not to launch a military campaign against the regime, arguing, "the problem that began in Iran must be ended in Iran," and concluded, "the soon to be free Iran doesn't seek your patronage. It seeks your partnership. It doesn't seek your funding. It seeks your friendship." In a subsequent essay for The Daily Telegraph, he called for the IRGC to be designated a terror group by the British government for its funding of Hezbollah, Hamas and the Houthis, as well as their suppression of Zan zendegi azadi.

In November 2024, Pahlavi called on Iranians to "reclaim and save our beloved Iran," but "did not directly address" how the Islamic Republic regime might be removed.

In late 2024, a series of videos circulated on social media that purported to show defections within Iran's army in response to Pahlavi's calls for military dissent against the Islamic Republic. While Pahlavi and his supporters presented the footage as evidence of growing opposition within state institutions and used it to promote his "National Cooperation" initiative, Iranian authorities, conservative media, and independent analysts disputed the claims, arguing that the videos were staged or AI-generated deepfakes.

In January and February 2025, he advised U.S. President Donald Trump against entering into an agreement with the Islamic Republic that would limit Iran's nuclear program in exchange for sanctions relief.

In February 2025, in an interview with The Daily Telegraph, Pahlavi called on Europe and Americans to prepare for the impending collapse of the regime in Tehran.

During the Twelve-Day War in June 2025, following the Iranian blackout of the internet, Pahlavi said the blackout "is a sign of panic, not strength." Pahlavi said in the same interview he viewed the destruction of Iran's military infrastructure and possessions, such as airbases and fighter jets as a loss. Pahlavi said that the war was not that of the Iranian people but Khamenei's war and that it was the Iranian people who were paying the price.

==== Munich Conference and formation of the Iranian Transition Government ====
In February 2025, the Munich Security Conference invited Reza Pahlavi to attend the event, but following pressure from the Iranian regime, the invitation was withdrawn. Shortly after, he was again invited to participate in the conference, only for that invitation to also be cancelled. Reza Pahlavi condemned this decision as "a betrayal of the Iranian people and the democratic values of Germany," stating, "the German government has not only silenced the voice of the Iranian people but has also directly aligned itself with the Islamic Republic."
At a "Munich Convergence Summit" in Munich on 18 February, with the participation of a number of Iranian opposition organizations, Reza Pahlavi stated, "Our goal today is solely the salvation of Iran, and in the future our mission is to hold free elections in Iran." He added that "the collapse within the regime has begun and must be broadened." He stressed that "our goal" should be to "establish a mechanism for cooperation" among different groups, rather than to create another opposition organization. He further emphasized, "Our future duty is to establish in the Constituent Assembly a democratic path based on the people's vote—and in contrast to the practices of 1978—wherein all possible options regarding the content and final form of Iran's new system are discussed transparently.

At the same time, a group of Pahlavi's supporters organized a protest rally on the sidelines of the Munich Security Conference, protesting against the conciliatory policies of the European Union toward the Islamic Republic, particularly those of the German government.

Pahlavi denounced inequalities and energy crises in Iran. He criticized the drying up of rivers and air pollution in Iran.

=== 2025–26 protests ===
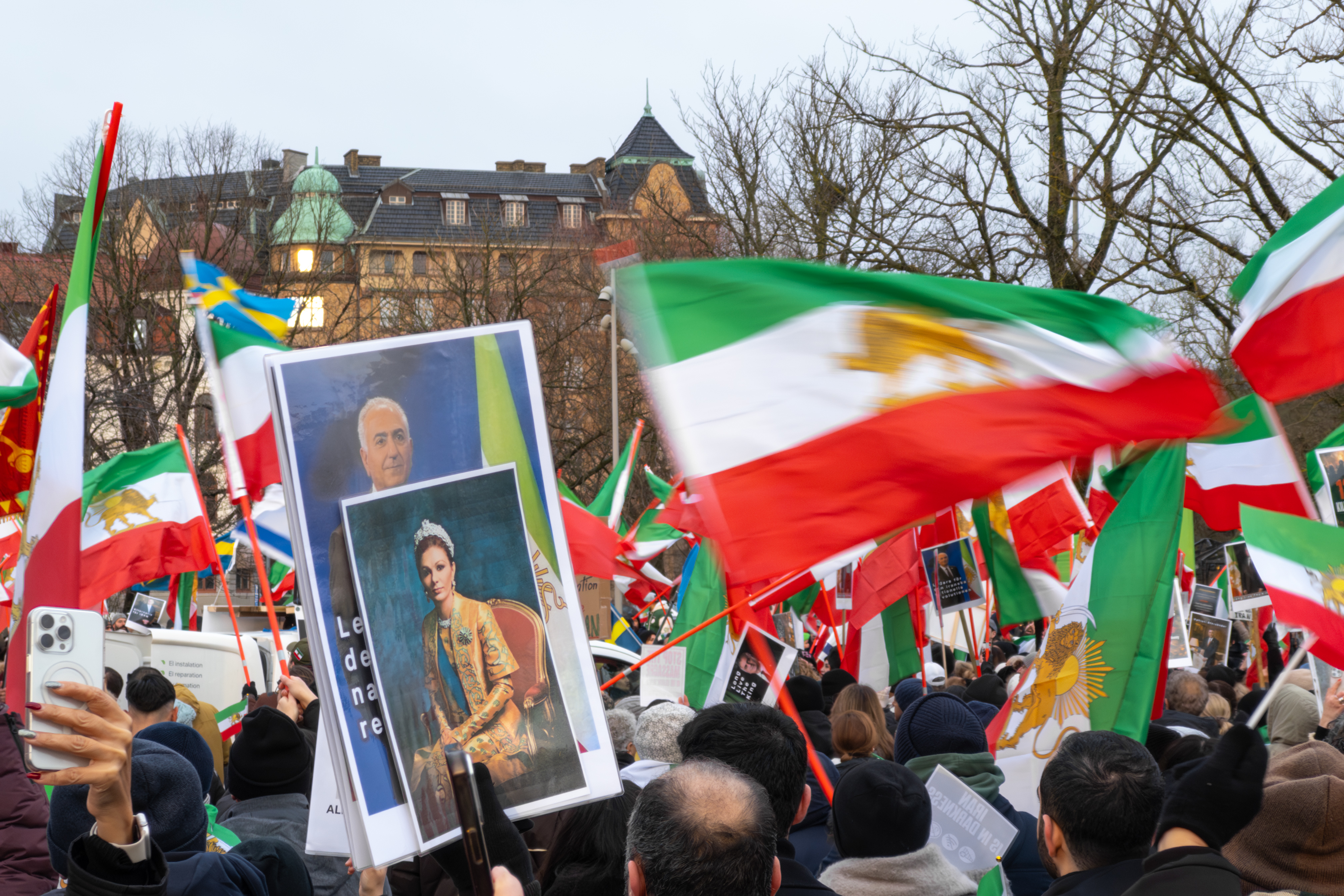
Protest in Gothenburg, Sweden against the Iranian government on 17 January 2026

On the eve of the protests, Pahlavi expressed his support for the protesters. By 6 January, he issued a call for Iranians to take to the streets at 20:00 on 8 and 9 January. From 7 to 8 January, there was a "dramatic expansion" in the rate and magnitude of protest activity. Upwards of several millions of Iranians took to the streets during the two days he called for protests; polling done in July 2026 suggests 54.6% of protesters present that day heeded Pahlavi's call. Regime forces massacred over 36,500 civilians in their pursuant crackdown. In many of the protests, Pahlavi's name was chanted repeatedly: "In ākharin nabarde, Pahlavi barmigarde!" (This is the final battle, Pahlavi will return!) and "Jāvid Shāh!" (Long live the Shah!) were among the most common chants heard.

According to an interview he gave to ARD, Reza Pahlavi said that Iran's transition would have to be based on free elections and a secular democratic system, and that he does not seek political power.

Some critics argued that apparent signs of prominence for Reza Pahlavi do not translate into the ability to unite or mobilize opposition forces, claiming that support for Pahlavi benefits the Iranian government by enabling it to frame the protests as foreign-backed and monarchist. In a 2026 interview, U.S. President Donald Trump said that Reza Pahlavi appeared "very nice" but questioned his ability to mobilize sufficient domestic support within Iran to assume power. In response, Pahlavi said that "millions of Iranians inside Iran and outside of Iran are calling my name." Nobel Peace Prize laureate Narges Mohammadi referred to Pahlavi's supporters as "the opposition against the opposition."

Pahlavi declared 14 February 2026 as a "global day of action," with major diaspora solidarity rallies that took place in Los Angeles, Toronto, and Munich. Over 250,000 attended the 14 February rally in Munich, while the Toronto and Los Angeles rallies each drew 350,000 in attendance. Protesters within Iran responded to Pahlavi's calls to chant anti-government slogans from rooftops and windows during the rallies abroad.

In late February 2026, the U.S. President's Special Envoy for West Asia Steve Witkoff confirmed in an interview that he met with Pahlavi at Trump's direction. In May 2026, The Guardian reported that pro-Pahlavi activists displayed SAVAK symbols and engaged in harassment and intimidation of rival Iranian opposition groups in London. Pahlavi has asked his supporters to distance themselves from "these types of behaviors and approaches", saying that "if any symbol is to be used, it must strictly be the Lion and Sun."

=== 2026 Iran war ===
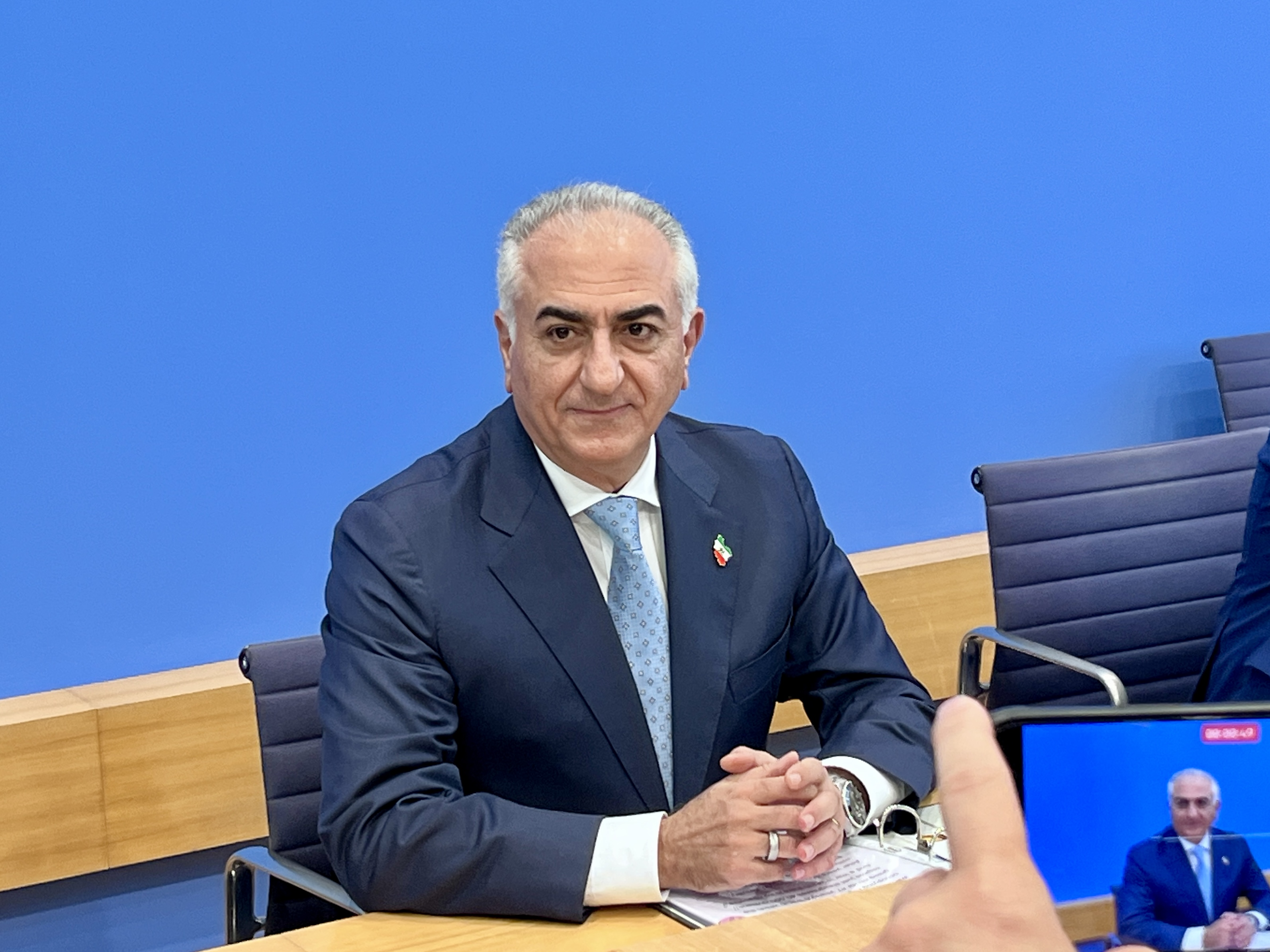
Reza Pahlavi in Berlin (April 2026)

During the 2026 Iran war, Pahlavi posted a video statement in which he said that the "assistance that the President of the United States had promised to the brave people of Iran has now arrived," arguing that "the attack was a humanitarian intervention, and its target is the Islamic Republic, its apparatus of repression, and its machinery of killing, not the country and great nation of Iran."

Pahlavi urged Trump "to exercise the utmost possible caution to preserve the lives of civilians and my compatriots. The people of Iran are your natural allies and the allies of the free world, and they will not forget your assistance during the most difficult period of Iran's contemporary history."

On the day prior to the attacks, he released an updated version of the Emergency Phase Booklet of his Iran Prosperity Project, which covers the first six months after the fall of the regime, focusing on Iran's immediate needs, including measures for economic stabilisation and institutional reconstruction.

Following the death of Ali Khamenei, Pahlavi stated in an interview on 60 Minutes that Iranians should be prepared to take to the streets and drive change when the appropriate moment arises. He said that the Iranian people were ready to "fight the fight" to end the Islamic Republic, adding that ongoing strikes against the government provided what he described as a "real opportunity" for Iranians, as they could now see the possible end of the regime.

On 9 March, Pahlavi said that he supported strikes on the IRGC and urged the army to join the people in toppling the government. On 11 March, Pahlavi told Iranians to stay home and continue the daily rooftop chants until he gives the "final call" to overthrow the government. On 14 March, Pahlavi called for underground resistance groups to intensify their fight against the Iranian government, while advising most Iranians to continue to stay home for now. He also noted that he has been in contact with the Trump administration. Also on 15 March, Pahlavi stated that the transition government under his leadership is ready to take control over Iran when the government falls, setting five economic goals for a post-Islamic Republic Iran. He also called for diaspora protests outside Iranian embassies worldwide. Pahlavi asked the U.S. and Israeli leaders not to attack civilian infrastructure in Iran.

Pahlavi has called for large public gatherings in solidarity with the protest movement during Chaharshanbe Suri. In his message for the Iranian New Year, he promised a 'final victory' over the Iranian government.

Pahlavi has called for Iranian people to create local groups to prevent the destruction of Iranian cultural and natural heritage after the government falls.

At the 2026 CPAC conference, Pahlavi outlined his vision for a free Iran, warning the American government not to strike a deal with the Iranian government.

On 3 April, Pahlavi called to expel the Iraqi militias from Iran, criticizing the Iranian government for bringing them.

On 5 April, Pahlavi called on the IRGC to step down before the U.S. targets Iranian infrastructure, saying that they are going to fall regardless, and that they should step down in order to preserve infrastructure.

On 9 April, at the beginning of the 2026 Iran war ceasefire, Pahlavi advised Iranians to exercise patience, noting that the Iranian people will need to deliver the 'final blow' to the Iranian government.

On 13 April, Pahlavi expressed disappointment in European countries for appeasing the Iranian government, which in his view supports terrorism and commits crimes against humanity. On 23 April, he was splashed with red liquid after leaving a press conference in Berlin in which he criticized the ceasefire between Iran and the U.S.

== Political views ==
According to Australia's ABC News, Reza Pahlavi believes in the establishment of a secular, democratic and liberal Iran.

Pahlavi has said that he has no intention to take a long-term leadership role in Iran should the current regime fall. He has said the Iranian people must choose the form of rule they prefer, whether constitutional monarchy or a republic, and that a referendum should be held to decide.

In 2024, Pahlavi told the BBC that he prefers that Iran choose to remain a republic, since he views this political system as more meritocratic. According to a December 2022 online poll by the Netherlands-based non-profit Group for Analyzing and Measuring Attitudes in Iran (GAMAAN) of 200,000 Iranians (158,000 inside Iran and 42,000 outside, 40% of whom identified as Muslim), 81% of respondents inside the country rejected the Islamic Republic. The GAMAAN poll also found Reza Pahlavi was by far the most popular first choice among 34 candidates to sit on the proposed "solidarity council" of the Iranian opposition, at 32.8% of support from respondents inside Iran. Axios reported that his "popularity exceeds that of any other Iranian opposition figure."

Pahlavi has advocated for increased tolerance within Iran, arguing for the establishment of watchdogs and the strengthening of civil society in order to avoid the concentration of power in one group. According to the University of Navarra, Pahlavi "has refused to commit to the restoration of the monarchy but has not renounced the 'prince' term most of his supporters use to address him."

Reza Pahlavi and the Iranian opposition have called for democratic countries to support the Iranian opposition's efforts in removing the Islamic regime and establishing a secular democracy in Iran. Pahlavi says that he and the opposition are representatives of the Iranian democracy movement whose activists are jailed and also tortured by the Islamic regime in Iran. Some Iranian activists are executed. Pahlavi is in contact with dissidents within Iran. The exact level of support Pahlavi has is not clear, with some sources stating he has little support from those "who make up the core of the reform movement," i.e., the Islamic liberal faction in Iranian politics.

According to Iranian activist and journalist Homa Sarshar, Pahlavi "has been consistent in his messaging." Sarshar believes Pahlavi should be part of a coalition. The Foundation for Defense of Democracies has said that one representative could assist in amplifying the Iranian message.

Regarding the possibility of chaos if the Islamic regime collapses, Pahlavi said that unlike other countries that underwent a chaotic transition, Iran is an ancient civilization, saying, "We are not Iraq or Afghanistan. We are a nation with millennia of unity. If there's rule of law and justice, there will be no anarchy." Pahlavi stated in the interview that there will be no civil war.

Reza Pahlavi promised in a June 2025 interview with Iran International that he would ensure "a lawful transition." Pahlavi stated that experts in transitional justice would ensure there are fair trials, promising every defendant the right to defend oneself in court. Pahlavi stated that unlike the 1979 revolution, no summary executions will be carried out. Pahlavi told Iran International that the transition would not be like the 1979 revolution. Pahlavi said the experts would ensure "equal rights for all Iranians—regardless of religion, ethnicity, or belief".

Pahlavi has stated that around 50,000 current and former officials from inside Iran’s government, military, and security forces have registered on a secure platform he created to coordinate efforts against the Islamic Republic and support a transition to a secular democratic state. He indicated that some units within the military and police have signaled they would turn against the regime, and many could be offered amnesty as part of a national reconciliation process. In an interview in March 2026 with 60 Minutes, Pahlavi outlined four core principles for building a new Iran. He pointed out the importance of Iran’s territorial integrity, a clear separation of religion and state, and the equality of all citizens under the law along with individual liberties.

== Foreign support ==
=== United States ===
Bob Woodward wrote in 1986 that the Reagan administration authorized the Central Intelligence Agency (CIA) to support and fund Iranian exiles, including Pahlavi. The agency transmitted his 11-minute speech, during which he vowed, "I will return," to Iranian television by pirating its frequency. The Tower Commission report, published in 1987, also acknowledged that the CIA was behind this event while a group in Paris calling itself 'Flag of Freedom' had taken responsibility for the act in September 1986.

James Mann wrote in February 1989 that when he asked the CIA about whether they helped Pahlavi, they refused to comment, and a spokesperson of the agency told him, "We would not confirm nor deny an intelligence matter."

In 2006, Connie Bruck of The New Yorker wrote that "Pahlavi had CIA funding for several years in the eighties, but it ended after the Iran-Contra scandal." Andrew Friedman of Haverford College states that Pahlavi began cooperation with the CIA after he met director William J. Casey and received a monthly stipend, citing Pahlavi's financial advisor and other observers. Friedman also connects his residence in Great Falls, Virginia, to its proximity to the George Bush Center for Intelligence, headquarters of the service.

In 2009, Pahlavi denied receiving U.S. government or foreign aid in an interview with The New York Times. Pahlavi said, "No, no. I don't rely on any sources other than my own compatriots" and denied allegations of working with the CIA, calling the allegations "absolutely and unequivocally false." However, in 2017 he told Jon Gambrell of the Associated Press, "My focus right now is on liberating Iran, and I will find any means that I can, without compromising the national interests and independence, with anyone who is willing to give us a hand, whether it is the U.S. or the Saudis or the Israelis or whomever it is."

=== Israel ===
In June 2025, amidst the Twelve-Day War, Pahlavi delivered a statement declaring that the Islamic Republic of Iran is "on the verge of collapse." He emphasized that internal divisions and defections within the regime signal its impending downfall. Pahlavi expressed confidence that the Iranian people, who have long resisted oppression, will soon achieve liberation. Pahlavi addressed the Iranian military and security forces, urging them to abandon the regime and join the people's movement for change. His stance during the Iran–Israel war, and especially his choice not to condemn the Israeli bombardment of Iran, was criticized by some Iranian opposition figures. Sina Toossi of the American Center for International Policy claimed that "he was really the only opposition figure that was supportive" of the Israeli strikes.

In October 2025, an investigation by Haaretz, in collaboration with the University of Toronto's Citizen Lab, reported that an Israeli-linked digital influence campaign was promoting Reza Pahlavi among Persian-speaking audiences. The investigation found that the operation used fake social media accounts and AI-generated videos to amplify pro-monarchist messaging. Citizen Lab's analysis suggested that the campaign's activities were synchronized with Israeli military operations in Iran. The investigation also reported that the network was operated from within Israel and was indirectly funded by Israel. A highly organized media network combining professional PR, diaspora activism, and what researchers describe as inauthentic online accounts promoted Pahlavi across social media. While this increased his international visibility, investigations suggest it also blurred the true level of his grassroots support inside Iran and sparked controversy over foreign ties, online harassment, and a manufactured image of popularity.

== Financial and legal issues ==
According to a December 2018 news report by Politico, Pahlavi "is thought to live mainly on what's left of his family wealth, his only full-time job being speaking out about Iran".

=== Shahbazi v. Pahlavi ===
In 1990, Ali Haydar Shahbazi, a former Imperial Guard member who worked for Pahlavi as a longtime bodyguard, filed a lawsuit in the district court of Alexandria, Virginia, accusing Pahlavi of breaching Iranian tradition by breaking his pledge to take care of him financially. Shahbazi, then aged 58, said in the court he abandoned more than $400,000 in property in Iran because Pahlavi assured him, "I'm going to pay your expenses and everything. I'm going to take care of you better than my father [did]," when he was hired, and then fired him with a handshake and $9,000 in 1989. Shahbazi asked for compensation for the $30,000 in taxes and penalties as well as an undetermined amount of money for his retirement.

Pahlavi's attorney dismissed the claim, saying that Shahbazi has received gifts worth several thousand dollars and was allowed to live luxuriously in Pahlavi's house in Great Falls, Virginia, adding that the servant was fired because his client ran out of money. Pahlavi agreed that Shahbazi was a loyal friend, but he offered support as long as he could. He also told the judge, "I was not involved in the day-to-day handling of my financial affairs."

In 1991, District Judge Albert Vickers Bryan Jr. argued that Pahlavi "had little knowledge of how his estate's money was spent and could not be held personally accountable for employment agreements with servants," declaring the case dismissed. According to media reports, Pahlavi began to cry in the court when the judge threw out the case.

=== Ansari v. Pahlavi ===
In 1990, Pahlavi and Ahmad Ali Massoud Ansari, his close aide and financial adviser, filed lawsuits against each other. Pahlavi accused Ansari of embezzlement amounting to $24 million, while Ansari claimed a $1.7 million lien against Pahlavi. During the trial, Pahlavi's attorney told the court, "[d]ue to the demands of his political responsibilities and his lack of experience in financial matters, Pahlavi had to trust completely in Ansari for the management of his funds... over the years, no one supplanted Ansari in any way in Pahlavi's trust. Conversely, no one betrayed Pahlavi's trust any more than Ansari," going further to accuse Ansari of being "an agent" for the Islamic Republic of Iran. Ansari denied the accusations and blamed Pahlavi for squandering the money with his extravagance, stating he faithfully carried out orders that Pahlavi was aware of.

The court asked Ansari to provide a complete accounting of his money handling, but he alleged that the documents had been destroyed to prevent a potential seizure. In 1996, the court ruled that Ansari should repay $7.3 million to Pahlavi and fined him an additional $2 million.

== Personal life ==
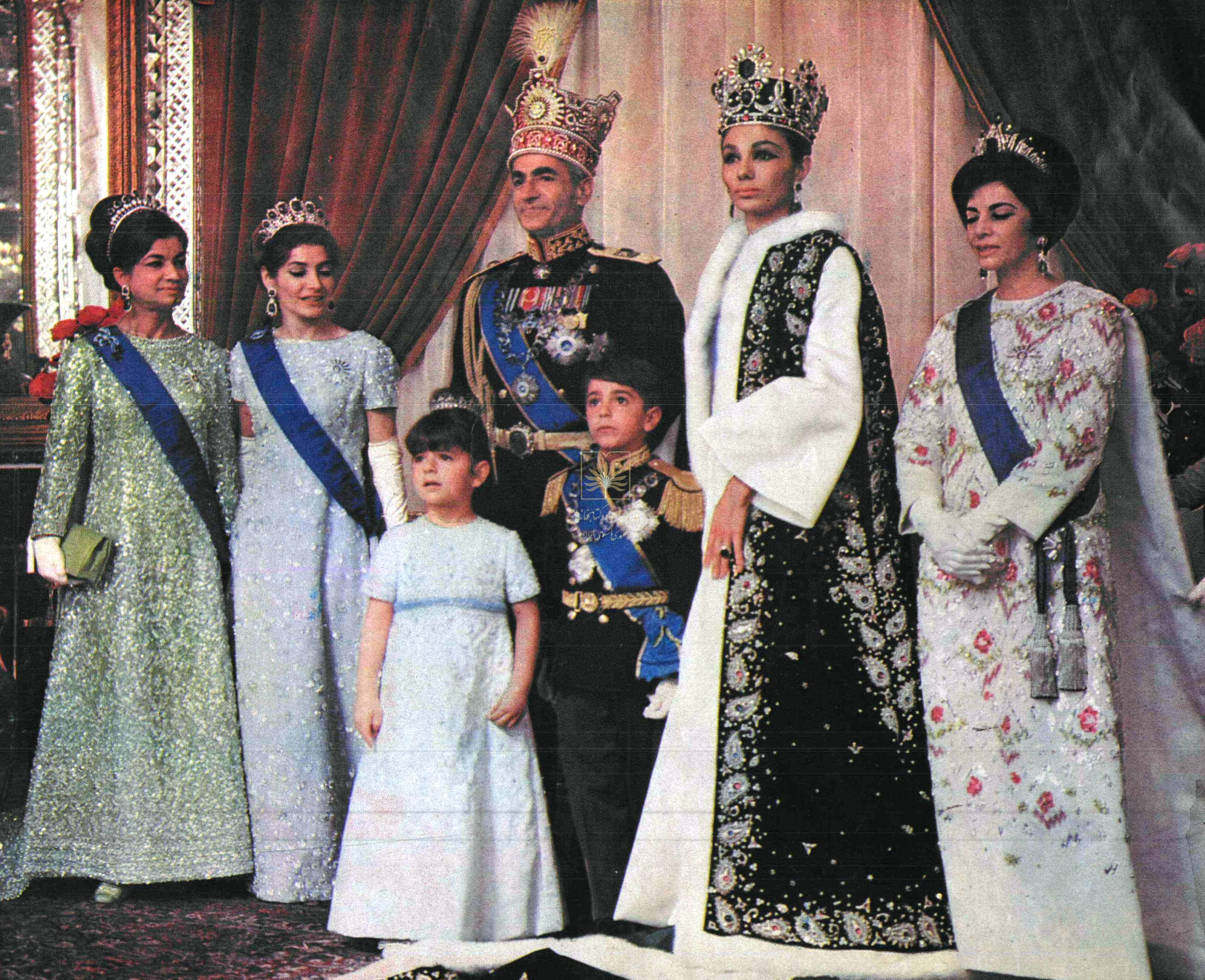
Reza Pahlavi with his family at his father's coronation in 1967

=== Relationships and marriage ===
Prior to meeting his now wife Yasmine Etemad-Amini, Pahlavi was reported to have dated several women, though those claims were based on unverified accounts and the women's identities have never been confirmed.

Pahlavi began courting Yasmine Etemad-Amini around 1985. They married on 12 June 1986, in Greenwich, Connecticut; he was 25 and she was 17. The couple have three daughters: Noor Zahra (born 3 April 1992), Iman Laya (born 12 September 1993), and Farah Mitra (born 17 January 2004). Iman married Jewish American businessman Bradley Sherman, head of partnerships at the delivery drone company Matternet, in 2025.

In 2004, Pahlavi was named the "unofficial godfather" of Princess Louise of Belgium, the eighth granddaughter of King Albert II of Belgium.

During the 1980s, he had lived in Morocco and in Paris before settling in Great Falls in suburban Virginia. In 1996, he became a resident of Potomac, Maryland and was still referred to as such in October 2025, despite reports that he had sold his Maryland house by July 2025 and moved to Paris.

=== Religious beliefs ===
Pahlavi is a Shia Muslim. When interviewed about religion in 2009, Pahlavi said, "That's a private matter, but if you must know, I am, of course, by education and conviction, a Shia Muslim. I am very much a man of faith."

On 6 April 2024, Prince Reza Pahlavi and Princess Yasmine Pahlavi visited the Bhandara Atash Kadeh Zoroastrian temple in Houston, Texas, and actively participated in the Yasna ceremony. During his visit, Reza Pahlavi stated:

Zoroastrianism is intertwined with Iranian history and civilization. Yasmine and I visited the Zoroastrian fire temple in Houston to honor this indigenous Iranian faith and show solidarity with our Zoroastrian compatriots and the Parsi community. Zoroastrianism, this ancient Iranian faith, has had a critical role in the development and progress of our great civilization. And I am convinced that its influence will only continue to grow as we see among our youth today.

== Honours ==
=== National ===
- Sovereign and Grand Collar of the Order of Pahlavi (26 September 1967, Iran)
- Mohammad Rezā Shāh Pahlavi Coronation Medal (26 October 1967, Iran)
- 25th Centennial Anniversary Medal (14 October 1971, Iran)
- Persepolis Medal (15 October 1971, Iran)

=== Foreign ===
- Knight of the Royal Order of the Seraphim (24 November 1970, Sweden)
- Knight Grand Cross of the Order of Merit of the Italian Republic (15 December 1974, Italy)
- Knight of the Collar of the Royal Order of Isabella the Catholic (19 April 1975, Spain)
- Grand Cross of the National Order of the Legion of Honour (14 December 1976, France)
- Grand Star of the Decoration of Honour for Services to the Republic of Austria (1976, Austria)
- Grand Collar of the Royal Order of the Drum (Rwanda)
- Knight of the Supreme Order of the Most Holy Annunciation (26 April 2023, House of Savoy)

=== Other recognitions ===
- Radio Farda's Person of the Year online poll (20 March 2011)
- Received the Key to the City of Beverly Hills from Mayor John A. Mirisch (23 January 2017, Los Angeles, California)

== See also ==
- Freedom of speech in Iran
- Human rights in the Islamic Republic of Iran
- Political repression in the Islamic Republic of Iran
- Political slogans against the Islamic Republic of Iran
- Status of religious freedom in Iran

== Bibliography ==
- Gozashteh va Ayandeh, London: Kayham Publishing, 2000. (in Persian)
- Winds of Change: The Future of Democracy in Iran, Regnery Publishing Inc., 2002, ISBN 0-89526-191-X.
- Iran: L'Heure du Choix, Denoël, 2009. (in French)

== Notes ==
Reza Pahlavi House of Pahlavi Born: 31 October 1960
Titles in pretence
| Preceded by Mohammad Reza | — TITULAR — Shah of Iran; 27 July 1980 – present Reason for succession failure: Monarchy abolished in 1979 | Incumbent; Heir: Princess Noor |
Lines of succession
| Vacant Title last held by Mohammad Reza | Crown Prince of Iran; 26 October 1967 – 11 February 1979 | Vacant Iranian Revolution |
| New title Party established | President of National Council of Iran; April 2013 – 16 September 2017 | Succeeded by Leadership Council |
