= Iranian opposition =

Political opposition to the Islamic Republic government

- Leader: Decentralised
- Ideology: Liberalism (Iranian); Anti-Khomeinism Factions: Iranian nationalism; Pan-Iranism; Republicanism; Mysticism (Persian) (Note: See Restart (group)); Secularism (Iranian); Monarchism (Iranian); Pahlavism; Mosaddeghism; Separatism (Iranian); Socialism (Iranian); Feminism (Iranian); Green politics
- Political position: Big tent
- Opponents: Iranian Principlists; Iranian Pragmatists; Iranian Reformists (factions)

Flags

The Iranian opposition (Note: Persian: مخالفان جمهوری اسلامی ایران, romanized: Moxalfan Jomhuri-ye Eslâmi-ye Irân) consists of various political groups, movements and people who oppose and seek the overthrow of the government of the Islamic Republic and its system of theocratic clerical rule based on the doctrine of the Guardianship of the Islamic Jurist (Velayat-e Faqih).

The opposition to Iran's theocratic government is ideologically diverse and includes republicans, monarchists, secularists, nationalists, liberals, and communists. In addition to secular and nationalist currents, Islamist groups and dissident Shia clerics have criticised aspects of the Islamic Republic and its political structure, though most are part of the Iranian reformists, certain Sunni Islamist and Kurdish Islamist movements have also opposed the state for religious or political reasons.

Opposition activity occurs both inside Iran and among the Iranian diaspora. Within Iran, political opposition is highly repressed by the government, and many opposition organisations and figures operate abroad. Protests organized by the opposition were violently suppressed, and many opposition figures, such as Mir Hossein Mousavi and Zahra Rahnavard, were held under house arrest for years without any charges. Thousands of political opponents of the Iranian government were summarily executed in 1988. Since the start of the 2025-2026 protests, Iranian government has been carrying out executions on an almost daily basis. Analysts and activists debate the mechanism of transition, whether change is more likely to emerge from within existing structures, mass civil resistance, elite fragmentation, or abrupt systemic collapse.

The issue of foreign intervention remains contested while some perspectives emphasise diplomatic pressure, sanctions, and international support for human rights as necessary tools to weaken authoritarian structures. Others warn that overt external intervention, especially military involvement, could undermine legitimacy, provoke nationalist backlash, or destabilise the region further.

These debates are reflected in the diversity of opposition actors. For example, the National Council of Resistance of Iran (NCRI) has outlined a Ten-Point Plan proposing a structured, rights-based democratic framework. Reza Pahlavi, Iran's exiled crown prince, has advocated for a 200-page plan that proposes he would lead the country during an 800-day transition. According to Reuters, the extent of support for restoring the monarchy within Iran remains uncertain, while pro-monarchist groups are divided.

Periodic nationwide protests have challenged the authorities, including the 1999 student protests, the 2009 Green Movement and 2009 protests following disputed presidential elections, the 2017–2018 and 2019–2020 protests, the 2022–2023 protests that followed the death of Mahsa Amini in police custody, and the 2025–2026 protests, which have been the largest unrest since the 1979 Revolution. These movements often articulate demands that extend beyond formal political change, calling for broader cultural transformation, personal freedoms, and social justice. In this sense, democratisation is framed not only as a political project but also as a societal one, involving shifts in norms surrounding gender, authority, and individual rights. These demonstrations were met with large-scale security crackdowns, resulting in tens of thousands of deaths, injuries, and arrests.

== Opposition during the Islamic Republic ==
=== Early opposition ===
==== 1979 revolution ====
Following the Islamic Revolution of 1979 and the establishment of the Islamic Republic, opposition to the new political order soon emerged. On 8 March 1979, coinciding with International Women's Day, thousands of women and supporters demonstrated in Tehran and other cities against proposals by the new authorities to enforce compulsory Islamic dress for women in public. The demonstrations continued for several days and became one of the earliest large-scale public protests against policies introduced by the post-revolutionary government.

On 14 June 1980, Ruhollah Khomeini called for the "Islamisation" of universities and the removal of what he described as Western and secular influences from Iran's higher education system. This directive led to the Iranian Cultural Revolution, during which universities were closed from 1980 to 1983 while curricula were revised and academic staff and students were screened for ideological conformity. During this period, numerous academics, students, and administrators were dismissed or prevented from continuing their studies or employment on political or religious grounds.

In the years immediately following the revolution, a range of political organisations sought to mobilise support among students and young people, including the People's Mojahedin Organisation of Iran (MEK). Universities became important arenas of political contestation between supporters of the Islamic Republic and various opposition groups. The Cultural Revolution and broader efforts to reshape cultural and political life in accordance with Islamic principles contributed to restrictions on secular and left-wing organisations and provoked periodic protests within academic and intellectual circles.

==== 1980 election tensions ====
On the final day of the elections, Massoud Rajavi met with President Abolhassan Banisadr and complained that members and supporters of the Islamic Republican Party (IRP) were intimidating voters, disrupting campaign activities, and attacking opposition supporters. According to accounts from the MEK, incidents included the disruption of rallies, assaults on campaign workers, and interference with ballot boxes. Following the elections, the MEK leadership concluded that it possessed sufficient support to function as a political opposition, but that the ruling establishment would not permit it to operate freely. Tensions subsequently escalated between the MEK and the IRP, while the organisation initially refrained from direct criticism of Ayatollah Ruhollah Khomeini. Revolutionary institutions aligned with the new government increasingly restricted the activities of the MEK and other opposition groups.

==== Crackdown and escalation of violence ====
After the dismissal and impeachment of President Abolhassan Banisadr by the Islamic Consultative Assembly in June 1981, the MEK called for nationwide demonstrations against the government on 20 June 1981. Large crowds gathered in several cities, estimates have suggested that the Tehran demonstration drew hundreds of thousands of participants. The protests were forcibly dispersed by security forces and pro-government groups, and the authorities subsequently launched a broad crackdown on the MEK and other opposition organisations. The events of June 1981 marked a turning point in the conflict between the Islamic Republic and armed opposition groups, leading to a period of violence, arrests, and executions during the early 1980s. As the MEK had become the main secular opposition to the Islamic Republic, Ayatollah Khomeini barred Rajavi from the elections declaring that "those who did not endorse the Constitution of the Islamic Republic of Iran could not be trusted to abide by that constitution". The MEK had boycotted the constitution by arguing it lacked proper councils, equal rights, nationalized assets, and a classless society.

==== Later opposition activity ====
In the following decades, opposition to the government in Iran continued to manifest through various protests and political movements. Notable examples include the 1992 Mashhad protests and the 1999 Iranian student protests. In 2004, a number of Iranian political activists in exile, including Hassan Shariatmadari, established the United Republicans of Iran (URI), a political organisation advocating a secular and democratic political system for Iran. Founded in August 2010 in New York as the Union for the Advancement of Secular Democracy in Iran, the organisation merged with the Organisation of Iranian Republicans in November 2014 and adopted its present name at its Los Angeles congress in June 2017.

=== Growing discontent ===
==== 2009 Green Movement ====
Widespread protests followed the 2009 Iranian presidential election, when protesters alleged that the government had committed electoral fraud. The protests became part of the Iranian Green Movement, At the time, the unrest was described by some observers as the largest in Iran since the 1979 Revolution.

During this period, Iranian women gained an increasingly prominent role in opposition activism, including campaigns against the country's mandatory hijab laws. In December 2017, a video of a woman removing and waving her hijab on a street in Tehran circulated widely on social media. The act inspired a series of similar protests in subsequent months, referred to as the Girls of Revolution Street.

==== Opposition unity ====
In November 2018, ten Iranian opposition organisations signed a joint memorandum of understanding intended to demonstrate unity despite internal divisions and to reaffirm their support for the overthrow of the Islamic Republic. The signatories expressed support for establishing a parliamentary democracy and for the separation of religion and state. The groups included the Republican Movement of Iran, Democratic Party of Iranian Kurdistan, Kurdistan Democratic Party, Komalah, Union of People's Fedaian of Iran, Komala of the Toilers of Kurdistan, Balochistan People's Party, Ahvaz Democratic Solidarity Party, Provisional Council of Left Socialists of Iran and the Democratic Alliance

On 12 June 2019, the tenth anniversary of the 2009 Iranian presidential election, 14 opposition activists based both inside and outside Iran signed an open letter known as the Statement of 14 Political Activists. The statement proposed a series of political and civil demands, including greater protection for women's rights, increased independence between the branches of government, amendments to the Constitution of Iran, and the resignation of supreme leader Ali Khamenei. Similar letters were published by other activists in August 2019, leading to a number of arrests.

In October 2020, Reza Pahlavi issued a message titled "New Pact", emphasising the rejection of the monopoly of power. He called for stronger connections between acts of civil disobedience throughout the country, including protests and strikes. He also called on all pro-democracy political forces to set aside their differences and unite for the transition from the Islamic Republic. Abdulla Mohtadi, Secretary General of the Komala Party of Iranian Kurdistan and a member of the Iran Transition Council, considered this message a positive first step, but did not consider it sufficient for unity among the opposition. Mojtaba Vahedi viewed Pahlavi's message positively, and commended his opposition to individual rule; however, Vahedi criticised Pahlavi's claim about his lack of desire for political power, asserting that political power is needed to implement political activity. He further called on Pahlavi to deal with those who create discord among the Iranian opposition to avoid prolonging the Islamic Republic. Ammar Maleki, a professor of political science in the Netherlands, assessed this move as positive and promising, but believed that more practical action is required.

In September 2022, widespread protests erupted across Iran following the death of Mahsa Amini, who was killed after her arrest for wearing the hijab "improperly". On 3 February 2023, former Prime Minister and reformist leader of the Green Revolution Mir-Hossein Mousavi called for a referendum on an end to clerical rule, stating that "he no longer supports the current Islamic Republic constitution". Over 400 political activists and journalists signed a statement where Mousavi called for the creation of a constituent assembly and a new constitution, believing that "with the current social awakening, and the society's disillusionment with reforms within the current political structure, there is no other way than allowing the people to decide their own destiny." This shift brings Mousavi in line with other opposition voices in its call for transition away from the Islamic Republic, and has support from Pahlavi, who reiterated the need for unity among opponents of the Islamic Republic government. Iran's top Sunni cleric Abdolhamid Ismaeelzahi also supported the initiative, saying, "Mousavi showed that he understood the realities of society. It's time for other politicians and ulema to think about saving the country and see the facts."

On 10 February 2023, the Georgetown Institute for Women, Peace and Security (GIWPS) hosted a conference called the Future of Iran's Democracy Movement, gathering major Iranian opposition groups to discuss a transition path for the creation of a secular and democratic Iran. Attendees of the summit included actresses Nazanin Boniadi and Golshifteh Farahani, Nobel Peace Prize Laureate Shirin Ebadi, activists Masih Alinejad and Dr. Hamed Esmaeilion; former soccer captain Ali Karimi, former Crown Prince Reza Pahlavi, and Kurdish leader Abdullah Mohtadi. The creation of the group Revolutionary Council of Dadkhahan was announced shortly afterwards, with a stated goal of supporting justice and an independent judiciary, along with the overthrow of the Islamic Republic of Iran to realise democracy and human rights in Iran.

In early March 2023, opposition groups published the "Charter of Solidarity and Alliance for Freedom", nicknamed the Mahsa Charter after Mahsa Amini. This effort received some attention from the press, and is seeking support from the international community. Due to his position as heir to the House of Pahlavi, Pahlavi emphasises his role "in this process of transition is to be of help to maintain a smooth process — to maximise the participation of democratic forces in this process", and that whoever the Iranians then elect in a free and open referendum is up to them. On 9 March 2023, five opposition groups announced the creation of Hamgami for a Secular Democratic Republic in Iran, a political coalition to advance the goal of establishing a "secular democratic republic in Iran". The coalition was created from the Union of Iranian Republicans, the National Front of Iran–Europe, the Left Party of Iran, the Iran National Front – Organisations Abroad, and the Union for Secular Republic and Human Rights in Iran. The coalition published its ten-point charter, the Fundamental Principles, on 31 March 2023, and held a press conference at the Central Library of the University of London on 3 April 2023. The charter commits the coalition to a democratic republic with separation of powers, an independent judiciary and media, equal citizens' rights, the abolition of the death penalty, and a foreign policy based on peace and normal relations with all countries, including the United States and Israel. Through the coalition, the five organisations joined a letter of 18 March 2024 to the United Nations Fact-Finding Mission on Iran on the suppression of protesters, and in June 2026 Hamgami joined four other republican blocs in a joint declaration. On 16 April 2025, Hamgami addressed a letter to the leaders of Germany, the United States, the United Kingdom and France, opposing any military action against Iran's facilities and infrastructure and calling for de-escalation and diplomacy, including transparent negotiations, effective IAEA monitoring and the easing of sanctions that burden the Iranian people, while maintaining targeted sanctions against human rights violators.

In December 2025, hyperinflation of the Iranian rial caused economic hardship in the country, leading to widespread discontent and resulted in the 2025–2026 Iranian protests. By 8 January 2026, the uprising had spread to all 31 provinces, with the Institute for the Study of War recording over 340 distinct protests in a single week. A nationwide general strike paralyzed major commercial centers, including the Grand Bazaar of Tehran, Tabriz, and Isfahan. In response to the unrest, the Iranian government implemented a total internet blackout and deployed ground forces from the Islamic Revolutionary Guard Corps to suppress demonstrators, particularly in Kurdistan and Kermanshah. Reports indicated that protesters had taken control of municipal buildings in several western cities.

In response to the unrest, Maryam Rajavi stated that Iran has entered an irreversible crisis, with decades of repression and corruption leaving the government weakened and facing growing public discontent. She said protests that began in late 2025 spread nationwide due to inflation, currency collapse, resource shortages, and poverty. According to Rajavi, regional setbacks, low electoral participation, and widespread dissatisfaction have eroded the regime's social base, while an organised resistance and younger protesters are increasingly challenging both religious and monarchical rule. Also in response, Reza Pahlavi called for strikes and urged members of the armed forces to defect. In a statement on 9 January 2026, he said that the Islamic Republic was "crumbling" and that the opposition had established secure communication channels with over 50,000 defectors within the regime's bureaucracy and military.

=== Recent developments ===
On 28 February 2026, as former Supreme Leader Ali Khamenei was killed in U.S.-Israeli airstrikes, the National Council of Resistance of Iran (NCRI) announced a provisional government in exile to transfer sovereignty to the Iranian people and establish a democratic republic. The group advocates as a gender-equal political alternative, supporting the separation of religion and government. The organisation has a history of holding large demonstrations in Paris, most recently during the wave of nationwide protests in Iran.

In September 2026, Iranian authorities arrested individuals who appeared in a video riding motorcycles near Karaj while waving the flag of the People's Mujahedin Organization of Iran (MEK). Iranian state television said all those appearing in the footage had been identified and arrested and described them as associated with the MEK. The MEK sais it represents those seeking a democratic and secular Iran rather than a restoration of the monarchy.

Analysts say it is difficult to gauge the level of support of either MEK or the Pahlavi movement in Iran, and reliable information on the MEK's level of support within Iran is also limited.

=== Proposal for a transitional government ===
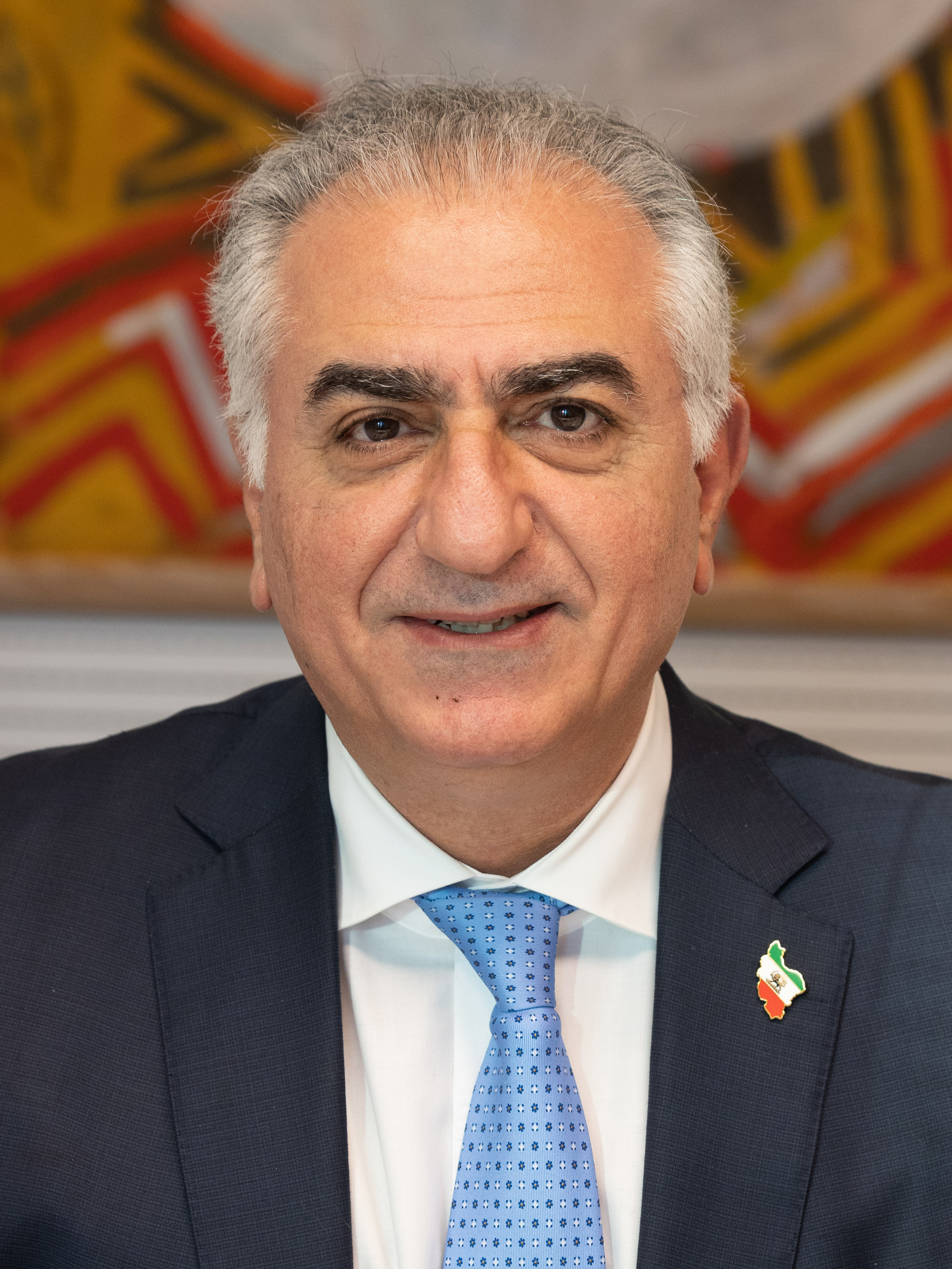
Reza Pahlavi

In concurrence with the 61st Munich Security Conference in February 2025, several Iranian opposition groups met in Munich in what was called the "Munich Convergence Summit". At the summit, a coalition of liberal and nationalist political parties selected Reza Pahlavi to lead a transitional government until the realisation of democratic elections and the formation of a new government in Iran. Pahlavi is the son of Mohammad Reza Pahlavi, the last Shah of Pahlavi Iran prior to the Islamic Revolution. He has stated that he personally prefers the establishment of a republic but that it is up to the Iranian people to decide.

On 17 June 2025, Reza Pahlavi declared the Iranian regime "in the process of collapsing" as Supreme Leader Ali Khamenei went into hiding amidst the Twelve-Day War. He then called on the Iranian people to "rise" and "reclaim" Iran, and presented a 100-day transition blueprint in the case of regime collapse. Two days later, Pahlavi confirmed to bipartisan members of the U.S. House of Representatives that he "does not seek power", but rather "to fulfil a duty to help lead this transition". The following day, Pahlavi confirmed through social media that discussions had started regarding a post-regime transition. On 22 June, following American airstrikes on Iranian nuclear facilities, Pahlavi urged Supreme Leader Khamenei to step down. He again reiterated that he does not seek power, but only to "help our great nation navigate through this critical hour towards stability, freedom and justice".

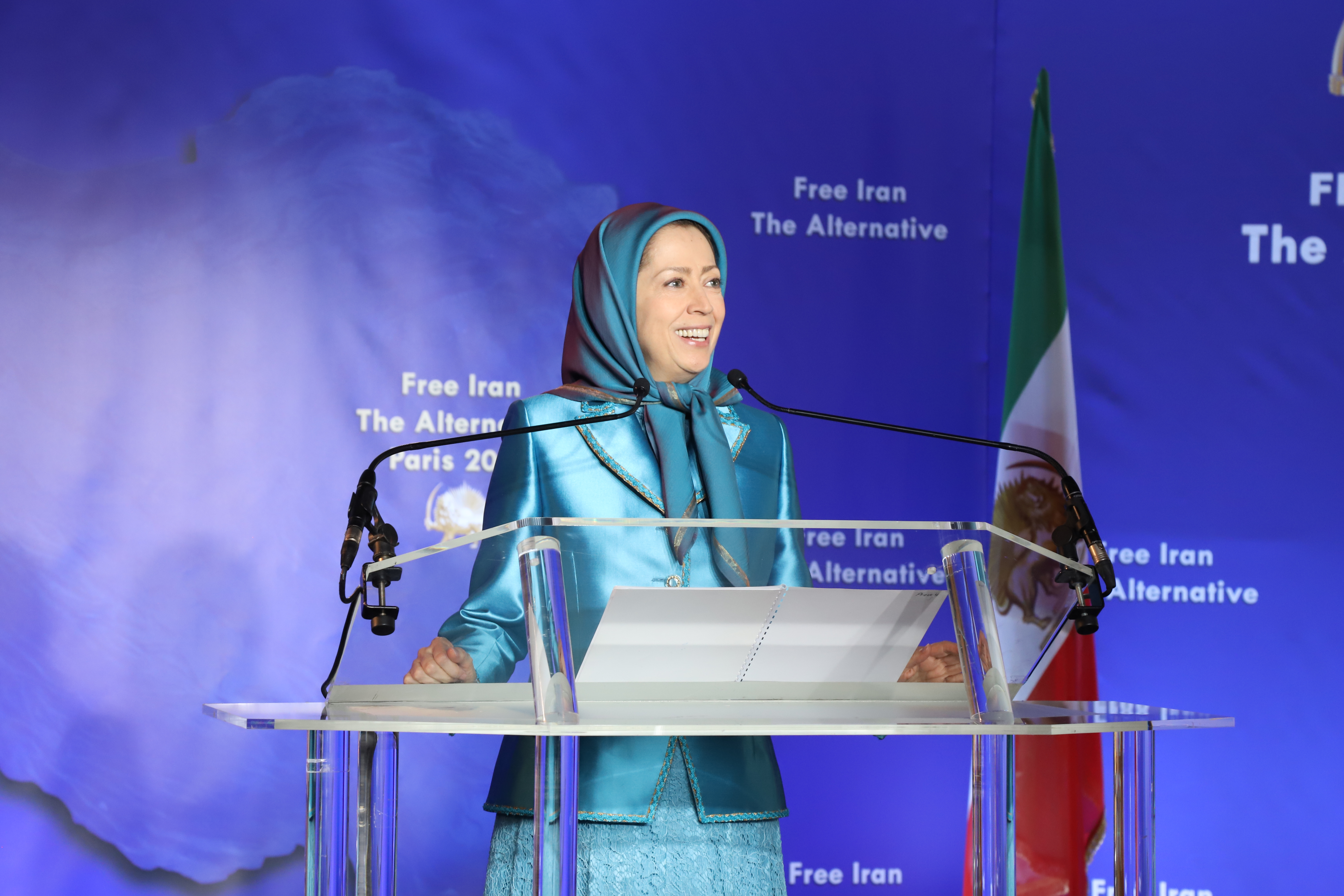
Maryam Rajavi in a 2018 rally

On 24 June 2025, the president-elect of the National Council of Resistance of Iran, Maryam Rajavi, said that an alternative government cannot be "imposed from above, as was done a century ago when Britain installed a monarchy by appointment". She added that "the solution for Iran lies neither in appeasement nor in war, but in a third option: regime change by the people of Iran and the organised resistance", stressing that the NCRI would be the best current option for change in Iran. She advocates for "a democratic, non-nuclear republic, with the separation of religion and state, gender equality and also autonomy for Iran's nationalities." Though, support for the NCRI remains unclear, and Reza Pahlavi stands out against all leaders. On 26 July 2025, Reza Pahlavi hosted a conference of opposition activists in Munich. He claimed that at least 50,000 officials from inside Iran's government and military registered through a secure channel to coordinate the ousting of the Iranian government.

According to an analysis from Robert Kaplan of the Center for a New American Security, Iran's natural borders makes itself distinct from many Arab states as the country was untouched by European border drawing, and is a civilisational cultural sphere similar to China and Greece. Kaplan believes this factor would allow Iran to "avoid the chaos that accompanied the yearnings for democracy in such an artificially drawn state as Iraq". He also believes that Iran is the "Middle East's geopolitical pivot point", and with a large and educated population, the country under a "more liberal regime" will have major influence on Mesopotamia to the west and Central Asia to the east. It is likely that an Iran under a liberal government would become an ally of the United States and Europe. On 31 July 2025, the National Council of Resistance of Iran organized a rally in Rome, where Maryam Rajavi proposed the overthrow of the Islamic Republic and the establishment of a democratic, non-nuclear state. The event drew support from notable Western political figures.

=== 2025–2026 protests and Iran war ===
During the 2025–2026 Iranian protests, large-scale demonstrations were reported inside Iran and across the diaspora. Hundreds of thousands of members of the Iranian diaspora participated in rallies in European and North American cities expressing support for regime change and a democratic transition. Iran International estimated at least 1.5 million protestors in Tehran, as well as thousands in multiple other cities. In exile, Pahlavi has remained a symbol for monarchists; and while some remember his family's rule as a period of modernisation, others associate it with censorship, repression, and the abuses of SAVAK. Despite efforts such as his symbolic 1980 coronation in Cairo and later attempts to form opposition coalitions like the National Council of Iran for Free Elections in 2013, critics argue these moves have had limited practical impact and at times conflicted with his message of democratic reform.

In July 2025, Pahlavi claimed that over 50,000 officials from Iran's government and security forces registered on a platform he created to coordinate efforts to topple the regime and establish a secular democratic state, as he sought to unify a broad opposition coalition despite criticism of his leadership. Following the 2025-26 Iranian protests, Pahlavi increased his diplomatic and media engagement, holding meetings with international journalists, policymakers, and political figures, and promoting a transitional roadmap. Several observers noted that Pahlavi emerged as one of the most visible opposition figures during the uprising. Maryam Rajavi called for the overthrow of Iran's ruling system following the 2026 Iran war, proposing a plan for a six-month transitional administration leading to free elections, separation of religion and state, gender equality, and a non-nuclear Iran.

== Major parties and organisations ==
=== Parties active in exile ===
- Communist Party of Iran (CPI)
- Green Party of Iran (GPI)
- Hamgami for a Secular Democratic Republic in Iran
- Iran National Council (INC)
  - Constitutionalist Party of Iran (CPI)
- Kingdom Assembly of Iran (API)
- National Union for Democracy in Iran (NUFDI)
- Organisation of Iranian American Communities (OIAC)
- Organization of Iranian People's Fedaian (OIPFM)
- People's Mojahedin Organisation of Iran (PMOI, MEK)
  - National Council of Resistance of Iran (NCRI)
- Tudeh Party of Iran (TPI)
- Union for Secular Republic and Human Rights in Iran (USRHR)
- United Republicans of Iran (URI)

=== Parties and groups active inside Iran ===
Parties or groups that challenge the system are generally prohibited, and activists may face surveillance, arrest, or other state pressure. As a result, domestic opposition organisations function in limited, informal, or semi‑legal forms.

- National Front (NFI)
  - Iran Party
  - Nation Party (NPI)
  - Party of the Iranian People
- Pan-Iranist Party
- Freedom Movement of Iran (FMI)
- Council of Nationalist-Religious Activists (CNRI)
- Coalition of Political Forces of Iranian Kurdistan
  - Democratic Party of Iranian Kurdistan (PDKI)
  - Kurdistan Freedom Party (PAK)
  - Kurdistan Free Life Party (PJAK)
  - Organization of Iranian Kurdistan Struggle (Khabat)
  - Komala of the Toilers of Kurdistan
  - Komala Party of Iranian Kurdistan
- Komala Kurdistan's Organization of the Communist Party of Iran (CPI)

== Public opinion ==
Following the 2017–2018 Iranian protests, a survey from the Iranian government found that a majority of respondents expressed dissatisfaction with the current situation, and that more than 31% of respondents have lost faith in government reform entirely. Among those dissatisfied, 41% reported willingness to participate in protests if they occurred. In July 2018, following the same protests, a report titled Iranian Public Opinion after the Protests was released by the University of Maryland School of Public Policy. The survey found that a large majority of respondents rejected the view that Iran's political system requires fundamental change: 77 percent disagreed with the statement, including 54 percent who disagreed strongly, while only 5 percent expressed strong agreement. The report also indicated that 67 percent of respondents disagreed with the assertion that the government interferes excessively in people's personal lives, with 30 percent disagreeing strongly. In addition, 59 percent rejected the claim that the government should not be strict in enforcing Islamic laws, including 33 percent who strongly disagreed. By contrast, 22 percent strongly agreed and 15 percent somewhat agreed that the government should not be strict in enforcing Islamic laws.

Other surveys conducted outside of state-affiliated channels have produced markedly different results. The Netherlands-based Group for Analyzing and Measuring Attitudes in Iran (GAMAAN), which conducts anonymous large-scale online surveys using VPN distribution and statistical weighting, reported substantially higher levels of opposition to the Islamic Republic in subsequent years. In a December 2022 survey conducted during the nationwide protests, 81% of respondents inside Iran stated that they would vote “No” in a hypothetical free referendum on the Islamic Republic, compared to 15% who would vote “Yes”. In a June 2024 survey, approximately 68% said they would vote “No,” while about 19–20% supported retaining the system. The 2024 survey further reported that around 70% opposed the continuation of the Islamic Republic and that 89% supported democracy as a form of governance. During the 2022 protests, 60% of respondents identified as proponents of regime change as a precondition for meaningful change. In addition, in a June 2024 pre-election survey, 65% stated they would not participate in the presidential election, with 68% of non-voters citing opposition to the overall system as their main reason for abstention. A September 2025 survey conducted after the Twelve-Day War reported a further increase in support for overthrowing the Islamic Republic compared to the previous year.

Since 2017, Iran has experienced repeated nationwide protest waves, including the 2017–2018 economic protests, the November 2019 demonstrations following fuel price increases, the 2022–2023 “Woman, Life, Freedom” uprising, and renewed protests in 2025–2026, which has been the largest uprising since the 1979 Islamic Revolution. GAMAAN's 2022 survey found that 80% of respondents inside Iran supported the nationwide protests, and its 2025 survey reported that 31% viewed civil protests as the most effective method for bringing about political change, compared to 14% who favored participation in elections.

=== Media ===
- Iran International
- Manoto
- Radio Farda
- Simaye Azadi

== International reactions ==
=== United States ===
In 2019, the U.S. House of Representatives introduced H.R. 374 in support of the Iranian people's desire for a democratic, secular, and non-nuclear Iran while "condemning Iranian state-sponsored terrorism". It offers support for a 10-point plan proposed by leader of National Council of Resistance of Iran Maryam Rajavi, which includes universal suffrage, market economy and a non-nuclear Iran. The resolution also called for the prevention of "malign activities of the Iranian regime's diplomatic missions" and that the U.S. "stands with the people of Iran who are continuing to hold legitimate and peaceful protests" against the Iranian government. The bill was introduced by Rep. Tom McClintock and received bipartisan support from 221 House members. According to McClintock, "There is a reason why a strong bipartisan majority in the United States House of Representatives has come together to co-sponsor this resolution condemning Iran's terrorist acts, it's because the world is watching the struggle for freedom in Iran, and it is cheering for your cause". He also mentioned that Iranian citizens have "taken to the streets and the airwaves" to protest against Ayatollah Ali Khamenei's regime, which he said has "lost any claim to legitimacy."

In 2023, McClintock introduced H.R. 100 to expressed continued support for the democracy movement in Iran since the Mahsa Amini protests. The bill received support from 222 House members, including 147 Republicans and 75 Democrats. The resolution "stands with the people of Iran who are legitimately defending their rights for freedom against repression, and condemns the brutal killing of Iranian protesters by the Iranian regime" and "recognises the rights of the Iranian people and their struggle to establish a democratic, secular, and non-nuclear Republic of Iran".

An article from Bloomberg in January 2020 revealed that then-Secretary of State Mike Pompeo ordered American diplomats to limit contact with several Iranian opposition groups to not jeopardise relations with the Iranian government. These groups included Iran Transition Council, Arab Struggle Movement for the Liberation of Ahwaz, South Azerbaijan National Liberation Movement, Komala Party of Iranian Kurdistan, Democratic Party of Iranian Kurdistan, and the People's Mojahedin Organisation of Iran.

=== Europe ===
Activist Masih Alinejad has criticised the German government for actively silencing exiled Iranian dissidents, mentioning the past Mykonos restaurant assassinations. In 2023, the European Parliament awarded the Sakharov Prize to the Woman, Life, Freedom movement, and imprisoned anti-regime journalist Narges Mohammadi was awarded the Nobel Peace Prize. The Ministry of Foreign Affairs of Iran condemned the decision.

== Opposition during the Pahlavi monarchy ==
In the period surrounding the 1953 Iranian coup d'état, many Shia clerics began to oppose Iran's secular government. For example, Ayatollah Abol-Qasem Kashani and his followers organised a series of protests against Mohammad Mosaddegh's liberal reforms. By July 1953, when Mosaddegh asked for a critical extension of his emergency powers, clerical members of "the Majles who supported Kashani left the National Front Coalition" and "set up their own Islamic Faction". (Muslim Warriors). This faction then boycotted the 1953 referendum concerning the dissolution of parliament.

In 1963, Iran launched the White Revolution, a far-reaching series of reforms to aggressively modernise the country. This aroused the antagonism of the ulama led by Ruhollah Khomeini, the future leader of the 1979 Islamic Revolution, who opposed the erosion of their traditional bases of power, and met with difficulties from a high failure rate for new farms and an exodus of agricultural workers to an alienating, atomised life in Iran's major cities. Eventually, the Shah exiled Khomeini in 1964, but he later returned to Tehran from exile in 1979 after the Shah fled Iran during the Islamic Revolution.

== See also ==
- Politics of Iran
  - Shia opposition to the Islamic Republic of Iran
  - Monarchism in Iran
  - Liberalism in Iran
  - Socialism in Iran
  - Separatism in Iran
  - List of Iranian defectors
  - Woman, Life, Freedom movement
  - 2025–2026 Iranian protests
    - 2026 Iranian diaspora protests
  - Iran Freedom Congress
  - Iran Prosperity Project

=== People ===
- Reza Pahlavi

=== Other national opposition movements ===
- Belarusian opposition
- Iraqi opposition (pre-2003)
- Libyan opposition
- Russian opposition
- Syrian opposition (2011–2024)
