= Iran-Novin Party =

Political party in Iran, founded 2023

Iran-Novin Party حزب ایران Ḥezb-e Īrān-e Novīn
- President: Hamed Sheinmanryad
- Founder: Hamed Sheinmanryad
- Founded: 27 October 2023
- Preceded by: Iran Novin Party
- Headquarters: Brussels, Belgium
- Ideology: Iranian nationalism; Secularism (Iranian); Monarchism (Iranian); Pahlavism; Economic liberalism
- International affiliation: National Council of Iran
- Colors: Blue

Website
- irannovin.party

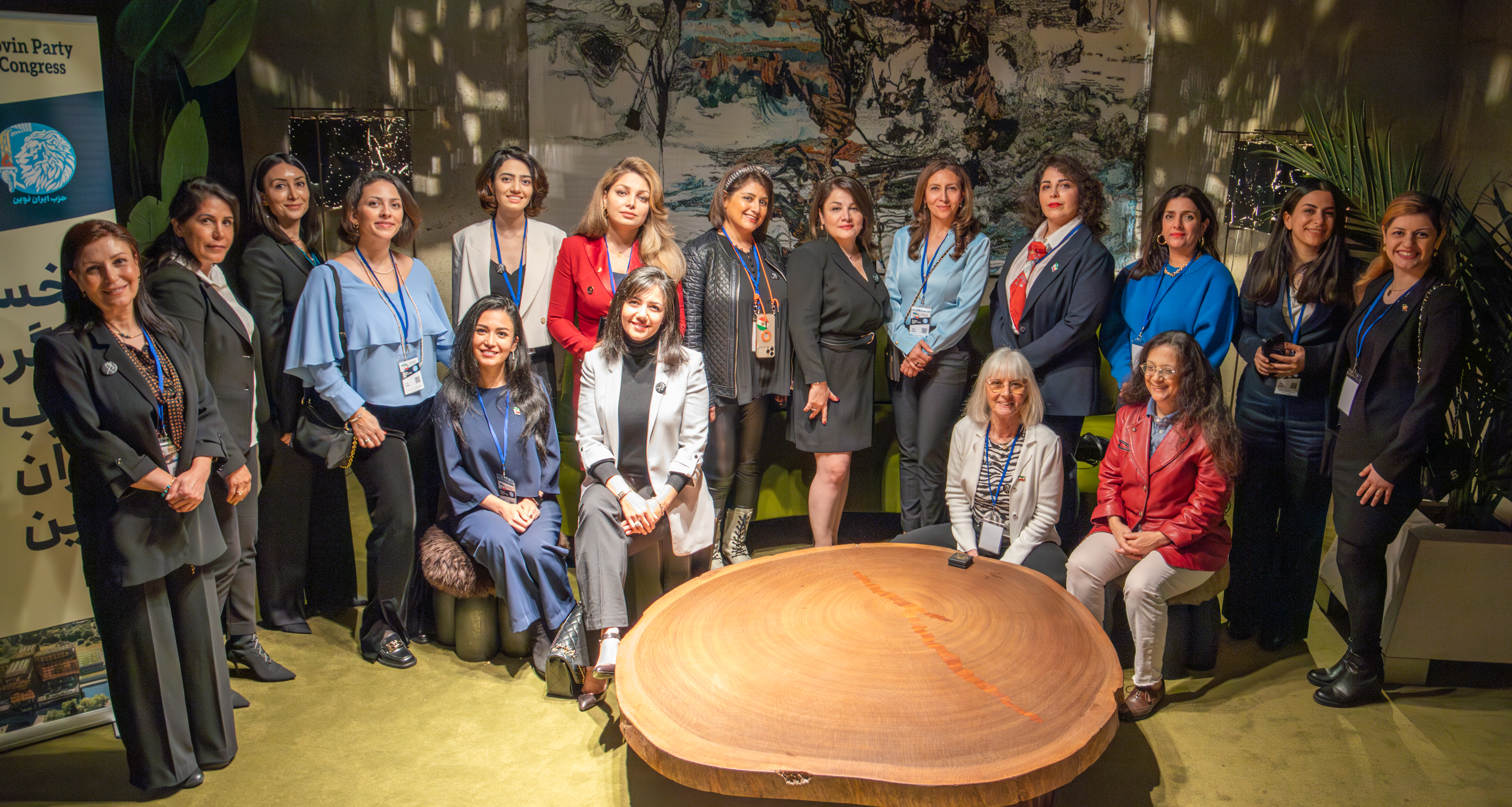
Meeting of the Iran-Novin Party (INP)

The newly founded Iran-Novin Party (INP), meaning "Party of New Iran" (Persian: حزب ایران نوین, romanized: Hezb-e Īrān-e Novīn), emerged in January 2023 through the efforts of Iranian members of the Farashgard Foundation and other exiled political activists who sought to establish a new political party.

The new Iran-Novin Party (INP) takes its name from the original Iran Novin Party (New Iran Party), which was founded in 1963 and dissolved in 1975. The original party aimed to modernize Iran and sought to achieve this during its tenure in government from 1964 to 1975.

== History ==
The genesis of the newly formed Iran-Novin Party (INP) is rooted in the ideological stream known as "Pahlavism." This means that the founders of the INP view themselves and their party as heirs to the Constitutional Revolution of 1906. They firmly believe that the two Pahlavi monarchs, Reza Shah Pahlavi and Mohammad Reza Shah Pahlavi, played pivotal roles in establishing constitutional frameworks in Iran. These efforts received strong support from patriotic Iranians dedicated to the nation’s reconstruction, resulting in significant achievements.

The members of the new Iran-Novin Party (INP) view themselves as heirs to this political legacy.

== Goals ==
In the wake of the massive protests by the people of Iran against the theocracy of the Islamic Republic in recent years, particularly in 2023, the Iran-Novin Party (INP) has committed itself to the abolition of the Islamic Republic and the establishment of a parliamentary, liberal, and democratic system as the most suitable form of government for the future of Iran.

In terms of economic policy, the Iran-Novin Party advocates for economic liberalism. According to the party, "maintaining the security of private property is one of the foundations of progress and development in society." Therefore, the Iran-Novin Party "considers the constitutionalists' wishes and the Pahlavi kings' valuable experience as its guiding principles, believing that the great Reza Shah played a remarkable role in realizing many constitutional ideals."

In contrast to some other Iranian political parties in exile, which were directly involved in the overthrow of the constitutional monarchy in Iran and the founding of the Islamic Republic, the Iran-Novin Party completely condemns the Islamic Revolution of 1979 as an "ideological rebellion in which outdated Islamic fundamentalists and stateless communists played a significant role."

== Founding Congress ==
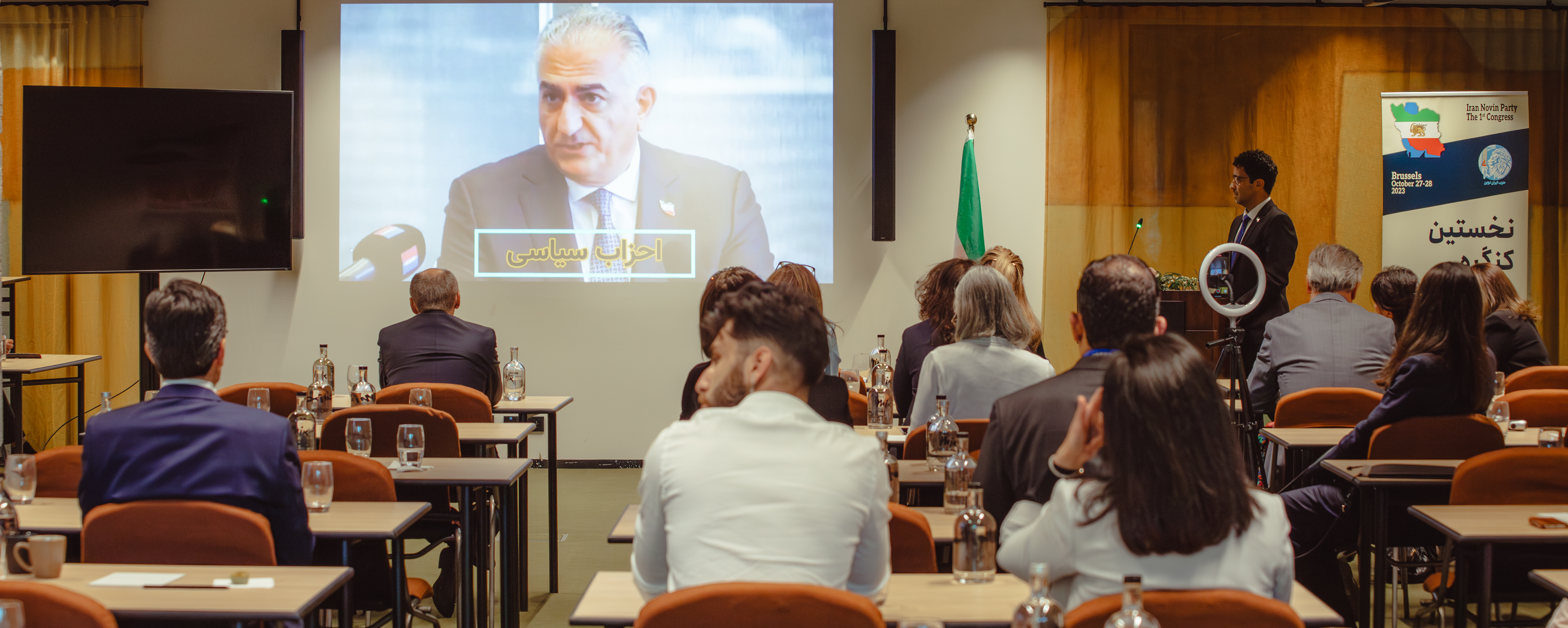
Message from Crown Prince Reza Pahlavi on the 1st day of the Congress of the Iran-Novin Party (INP)

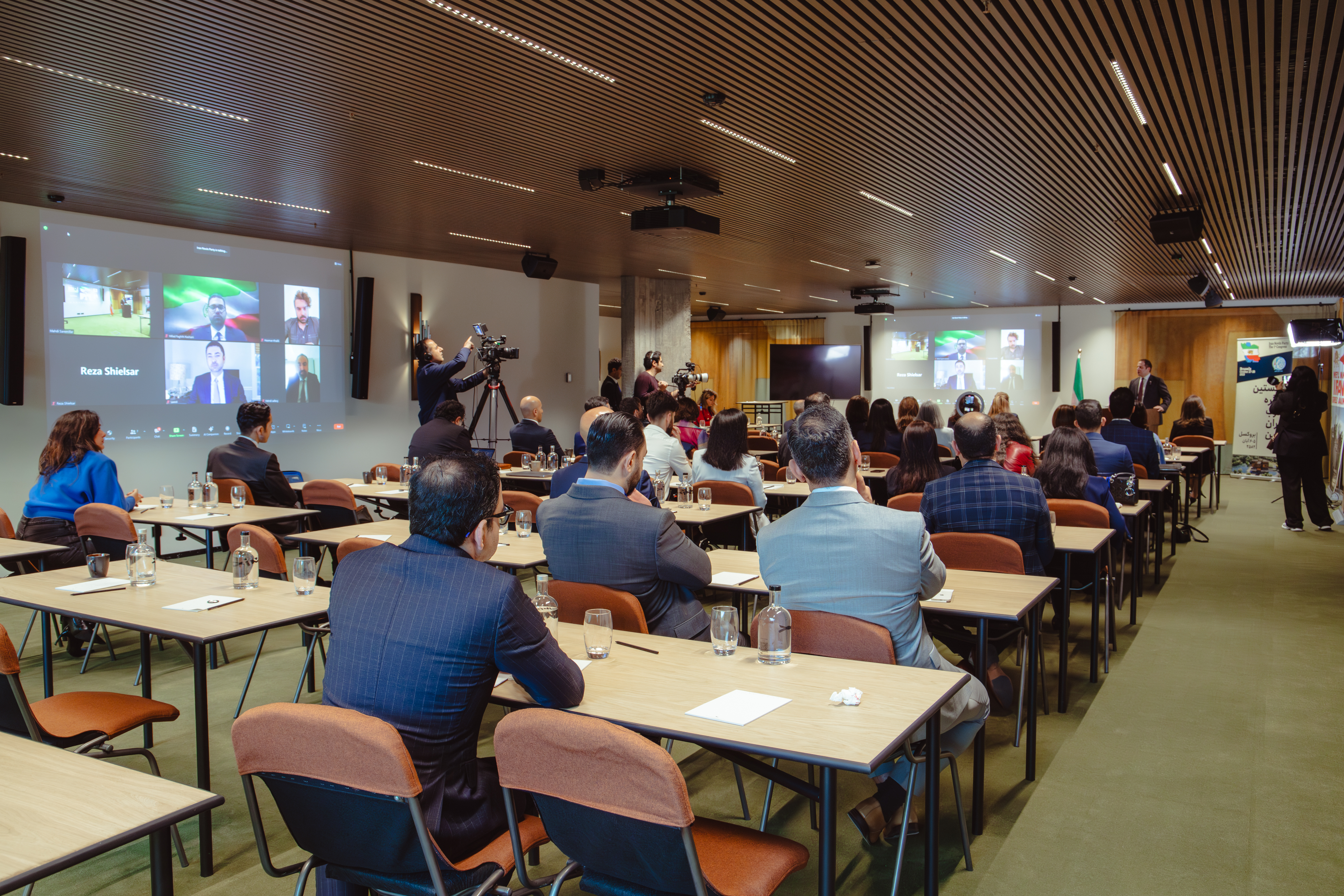
Members of the Iran-Novin Party on the 1st day of the INP Congress

To establish a democratically elected leadership and an official party platform voted on by its members, the 1st Congress of the Iran-Novin Party was held on October 27 and 28, 2023, in Brussels, Belgium.

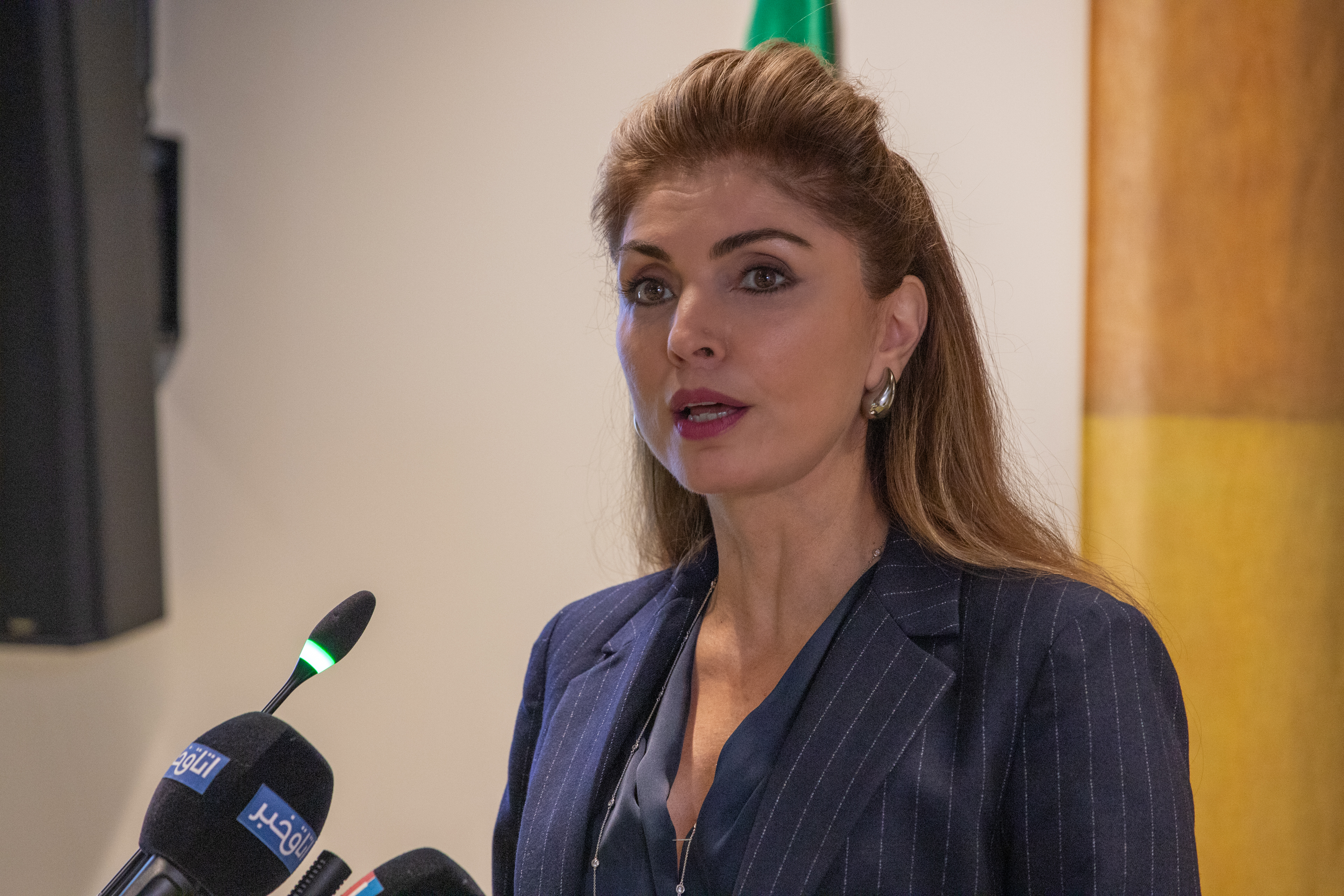
Yasmine Pahlavi's opening speech at the founding congress of the Iran-Novin Party (INP)

The opening speech was delivered by Yasmine Pahlavi, who reminded the members of the new Iran-Novin Party (INP) of the great tradition of the old Iran-Novin Party, whose members strived for the prosperity and well-being of all Iranians. She called on the new Iran-Novin Party (INP) to always remain committed to this important responsibility.

At this congress, in addition to the election of other members of the party's leadership bodies, Dr. Hamed Sheibanyrad was elected as the first chairman of the Iran-Novin Party for a two-year term. After his election, he outlined the INP's upcoming work in three stages: actions leading to the collapse of the Islamic Republic regime; activities necessary for the first 100 days following the regime's fall, during the transition period to democracy; and long-term measures after the establishment of democracy in the country. The party program was also adopted.

Other political parties, such as the "Constitutionalist Party of Iran - Liberal Democratic," and the exiled Iranian Crown Prince Reza Pahlavi, congratulated the Iran-Novin Party (INP) on its first congress.

== Political opinions ==
The following positions of the Iran-Novin Party can be highlighted from the party program adopted at the founding congress in October 2023:

=== Country and state ===
• The Iran-Novin Party considers the country’s independence from the domination and influence of foreign governments or elements a national necessity and asserts its fundamental belief in Iran’s national and territorial integrity.

• The Iran-Novin Party recognizes the Persian language as the country’s national language based on historical evidence and does not see this as conflicting with the need to protect, strengthen, and expand other languages and dialects within the country.

• While believing in a market economy, the Iran-Novin Party considers government regulations and market operation under these regulations to be inevitable.

=== Government and politics ===
• The Iran-Novin Party upholds the values of liberal democracy in politics and views secularism as a vital and unavoidable foundation for it.

• The Iran-Novin Party believes that good governance requires the rule of law. It views a stable democracy as one that follows a democratic rule of law, based on the separation of powers and ensuring the fundamental rights of citizens.

• The Iran-Novin Party believes that adherence to the principles and provisions of the Universal Declaration of Human Rights is crucial for maintaining a stable political environment in Iran.

=== Economy and society ===
• The Iran-Novin Party considers competition and meritocracy in all political, social, and economic spheres essential for the country's progress.

• The Iran-Novin Party deems it necessary to establish public and private social security systems under government regulations.

• The Iran-Novin Party believes that the government has a fundamental duty to provide free education for all Iranian applicants, at least until the end of secondary school.
