= Farashgard =

- Founded: September 16, 2018; 7 years ago
- Headquarters: Washington, D.C., United States
- Ideology: Monarchism (Iranian); Pahlavism; Liberalism (Iranian); Secularism (Iranian)
- Colours: Turquoise
- Slogan: We Will Reclaim Iran and Rebuild It

Website
- iranrevival.com

Farashgard (Persian: فَرَشگَرد) also known as Iran Revival, is an Iranian political action network. This organization was founded in September 2018, ten months after the beginning of the 2017–2018 Iranian protests. The organization was founded by 40 Iranian activists across the United States, Canada, Europe, and Iran.

Farashgard advocates for a secular democracy in Iran either through a Democratic republic or a Constitutional monarchy, but states that the exact form of a future political system will be determined by the people of Iran after the overthrow of the Islamic Republic.

The group's slogan is: "We Will Reclaim Iran and Rebuild It". Its original name Farashgard was metaphorically named after the Middle Persian concept Frashokereti.

== Activities inside Iran ==
The group has a number of supporters within Iran who receive the messages of Iran Revival through Persian language television and radio broadcasts. Supporters of the group in Iran have enacted a civil disobedience campaign inside the country by spray painting calls for a million man march, and slogans against the regime, on buildings, billboards, and storefronts across Iran.

As of September 2021, the group has over 220,000 followers on Instagram, one of the most popular apps in Iran.

=== Campaigns ===
- Meidân-e Miliuni (Million in a square): A social media campaign with the aim of organizing a million people in Tehran. It has a Persian hashtag: #میدان_میلیونی
- Pošt Be Došman, Ru Be Mihan (Back to the Enemy, Facing Homeland): #پشت_به_دشمن_رو_به_میهن
