= Shariatmadari =

Shariatmadari may refer to:

- Mohammad Kazem Shariatmadari (1905–1986), Iranian Grand Ayatollah
- Ali Shariatmadari (1924–2017), Iranian academic and educationist, Minister of Culture in the interim government of Mehdi Bazargan in 1979
- Hassan Shariatmadari, Iranian opposition politician and son of Mohammad Kazem Shariatmadari
- Hossein Shariatmadari (born 1948), Iranian journalist
- Mohammad Shariatmadari (born 1960), Iranian politician, and Vice President for External Affairs from 2013–2017
