= Iran National Council =

- Chairperson: Reza Pirzadeh
- Spokesperson: Reza Pahlavi
- Founder: Reza Pahlavi
- Founded: April 2013; 13 years ago
- Headquarters: Paris, France
- Ideology: Democratization; Secularism (Iranian); Majority: Monarchism (Iranian)
- Political position: Big tent

Party flag

Website
- irannc.org

Iran National Council for Free Elections (Persian: شورای ملی ایران برای انتخابات آزاد), also called the Iran National Council (INC; Persian: شورای ملی ایران, romanized: Šurā-ye melli-e Irān) or the National Council of Iran (NCI), is a political umbrella group headquartered in Paris, France. It serves as part of the Iranian opposition to the government of the Islamic Republic of Iran, with Reza Pahlavi acting as its spokesman. Pahlavi, who lives in the United States, is the former Crown Prince of Iran and is the son of the deposed Shah, and previously declared himself to be the new "Reza Shah II" in exile in 1980, following the 1979 revolution and the death of his father. Though Pahlavi has expressed support for a republic, he has not renounced his claim to the throne.

The "self-styled" National Council claims to represent religious and ethnic minorities, as well as monarchists and republicans. According to Kenneth Katzman, in 2017, the group which was established with over 30 groups in 2013 had suffered defections and its activity level appeared minimal.

In 2025–26 researchers identified coordinated online campaigns promoting Reza Pahlavi and his political movement.

== See also ==
- Constitutionalist Party of Iran
- Iran-Novin Party
- Iranian opposition
- Government in exile
