= Pahlavism =

Iranian nationalist and monarchist ideology

Pahlavism (Persian: پهلوی‌گرایی, romanized: Pahlavi-gerāyi) is an Iranian nationalist and monarchist ideology associated with the rule of the Pahlavi dynasty in Iran (1925–1979). It combined state-led modernization, Iranian nationalism emphasizing the country's pre-Islamic past, and a strong centralized state. It is also considered a case of liberal autocracy. While often characterized as pro-Western, scholars note that in its later phase the ideology incorporated increasing emphasis on cultural authenticity and elements of state anti-Western rhetoric.

== History ==
=== Origins ===
Under Reza Shah, Pahlavism consisted in practical reforms rather than a clearly articulated ideology. Amin Banani noted in 1959 (after Reza Shah's death):

Unlike Kemal Ataturk, whose reforms he emulated freely, [Reza Shah] made no public utterances, wrote no articles, left no testaments the total of which could be considered his program or the ideological core of his revolution. We cannot speak of Pahlavism as we do of Kemalism.

However, during the reign of Mohammad Reza Pahlavi, the monarchy sought to develop a more codified ideological structure. Pahlavism emerged as a distinct framework, particularly accelerating after the 1953 coup. Unlike traditional rule, it sought to transform the crown into a modernizing institution capable of competing with communist, socialist, and Islamist ideologies.

According to Zhand Shakibi, this development moved the monarchy from being a guarantor of stability to a "revolutionary" force during the White Revolution. The ideology was built upon the concept of the "King-Philosopher," where the Shah was presented as both a political leader and an intellectual guide, rooted in the ancient Iranian idea of farr-e izadi (divine glory).

== Core pillars ==
Shakibi identifies several fundamental pillars that defined Pahlavism as a modern ideological school:

- Archaism and Nationalism: The ideology emphasized Iran's pre-Islamic heritage, particularly the Achaemenid Empire, to create a national identity independent of Islamic clerical influence. This was exemplified by the 2,500-year celebration of the Persian Empire in 1971.
- Statist Modernization: Pahlavism promoted the idea that only a powerful monarchy could act as the primary agent of socio-economic change and propel Iran into the "Great Civilization."
- Secularism: While not explicitly anti-religious, it sought to marginalize the political power of the Ulama by promoting the state as the sole source of law and social guidance.

== Symbolism and cultural policy ==
A key element of Pahlavism was the use of historical symbolism to reinforce national pride. This included the promotion of pre-Islamic Persian architecture and the controversial 1976 adoption of the Imperial calendar (Taqvim-e Shahanshahi), which dated the Iranian year from the coronation of Cyrus the Great rather than the Hijra.

According to Shakibi, these cultural policies were designed to bypass the Islamic period of Iranian history and create a direct link between the modern Pahlavi state and the ancient Persian empires. This "secular nationalism" was disseminated through the education system and state-controlled media to foster a new generation of Iranians loyal to the monarchical-modernist ideal.

== The Resurgence Party and failure ==
In 1975, the ideological development reached its peak with the establishment of the Rastakhiz Party, which Mohammad Reza Pahlavi envisioned as the sole vehicle for Pahlavism. The party was intended to achieve ideological and political unity, requiring all Iranians to participate in its structures. During this period, the ideology was further codified through the publication of the Shah's books, such as "Toward the Great Civilization", which outlined a future for Iran as a leading industrial power.

However, Shakibi notes that Pahlavism failed to maintain mass support. The ideology remained a "top-down" construct that did not address the shifting social and economic realities of the late 1970s. The excessive focus on the monarch's persona and the exclusion of alternative political voices eventually contributed to the collapse of the state during the Iranian Revolution.

=== Development under Mohammad Reza Pahlavi ===
Under Reza Shah's son Mohammad Reza Pahlavi, Pahlavism evolved into a more visible ideology. During the later decades of his reign, it was expressed through royal ceremonies, such as his belated coronation and the 2,500-year celebration of the Persian Empire, and the establishment of the Rastakhiz Party as a single party.

During this period, the Shah modified state discourse in response to growing societal and intellectual criticism of Pahlavi Westernization. These adjustments emphasized Iranian cultural authenticity and contributed to the incorporation of anti-Western rhetoric into the state's official ideology.

Pahlavism was ultimately displaced following the Iranian Revolution, which established a new political order fundamentally opposed to the Pahlavi monarchy.

== Characteristics ==
In its modernist orientation, Pahlavism has been compared to the Kemalism of Turkey, the Baathism of Syria and Iraq, and the more recent Heydarism of the Republic of Azerbaijan.

According to M. Hakan Yavuz, "secular-authoritarian ideologies associated with Kemalism, Pahlavism, and Baathism elided the more pluralist forms of Islamic revival and reform".

Quoting Zhand Shakibi, "Pahlavism professed the importance of the 1906 Constitution but did not advocate the type of free elections characterizing the West's liberal democracies."

=== Relationship with the West ===
Pahlavism initially embraced Western models of state-building, legal reform, and modernization. However, particularly during the later reign of Mohammad Reza Pahlavi, state discourse increasingly emphasized cultural authenticity and resistance to perceived Western cultural domination, incorporating elements of state-led anti-Western rhetoric, as a reaction to increasing social and intellectual criticism of Pahlavi Westernization.

== Organizations ==
=== Before 1979 ===
- Iran-e-No Party (1927)
- Progress Party (1927–1932)
- Justice Party (1941–1946)
- National Union Party (1944–1950s)
- Aria Party (1946–1953)
- Nationalists' Party (1957–1963)
- People's Party (1957–1975)
- Iran Novin Party (1963–1975)
- Rastakhiz Party (1975–1978)

=== After 1979 ===
- Constitutionalist Party of Iran (1994–present)
- Iran National Council (2013–present; factions)
- Iran-Novin Party (2023–present)

These are asylum groups and have been banned from Islamic Republic of Iran, which antagonizes Pahlavism.

== See also ==
- Authoritarian nationalism
- Human rights in Pahlavi Iran
- Iran Prosperity Project
- Iranian nationalism
- Khomeinism
- Mosaddeghism
- Progressive conservatism
- White Revolution

== Sources ==
- Banani, Amin (1959). Impact of the West on Iran, 1921–1941.
- Pullapilly, Cyriac K. (1980). Islam in the Contemporary World. Cross Roads Books. ISBN 978-0-940121-00-3.
- Shakibi, Zhand (2018). "The Rastakhiz Party and Pahlavism: the beginnings of state anti-Westernism in Iran". British Journal of Middle Eastern Studies. 45 (2): 251–268. doi:10.1080/13530194.2016.1246242. JSTOR 48541228.
- Shakibi, Zhand (2013). "Pahlavīsm: The Ideologization of Monarchy in Iran". Politics, Religion & Ideology. 14 (1): 114–135. doi:10.1080/21567689.2012.751911.
- Shakibi, Zhand (2019). Pahlavi Iran and the Politics of Occidentalism. Bloomsbury. ISBN 978-1-78673-630-7.
- Yavuz, M. Hakan (2013). Toward an Islamic Enlightenment: The Gülen Movement. Oup USA. ISBN 978-0-19-992799-9.
- Pahlavi, Mohammad Reza (1961). Mission for My Country. London: Hutchinson. p. 336. ISBN 978-0090628308.
- Pahlavi, Mohammad Reza (2024). Toward the Great Civilization. London: I.B. Tauris. ISBN 978-0755654178.
