= Alawite opposition to Ba'athist Syria =

Alawites who opposed the Assad family

Alawites had a history of opposing Ba'athist Syria dating back to presidency of Hafez al-Assad, and continued during the presidency of Bashar al-Assad until Ba'athist Syria had collapsed in 2024. The Assad family was also Alawite.

== Background ==
After a series of coups, the 1963 Syrian coup d'état helped the Ba'ath Party seize power. Alawite military officers Hafez al-Assad and Salah Jadid took part in the coup. In 1970, Hafez al-Assad launched the Corrective Movement and overthrew fellow Salah Jadid. Alawites were largely poor and rural, and were a marginalized group in Syria until Hafez al-Assad gained power. Robert D. Kaplan claimed that an Alawite ruling Syria was an "unprecedented development shocking to the Sunni-majority population which had monopolized power for so many centuries."

Under Hafez al-Assad, Alawites constituted the majority of Syrian military and political elites. He stripped Sunnis, Druze, and Isma'ilis of their political and military positions and gave them to Alawites. Although the social status of Alawites improved, their living conditions remained relatively poor, and the Sunni-Alawite tensions persisted. In 1971, Assad declared himself president of Syria, a position that was constitutionally reserved for Sunnis. In 1973, a new constitution was adopted, removing Islam as the state religion and only mandating that the president be a Muslim, without mentioning a specific sect. In 1974, in order to ease tensions, Musa as-Sadr issued a fatwa recognising Alawites as Muslims.

== Opposition ==
After the Islamist uprising in Syria, the Hafez al-Assad carefully ensured the dominance of Alawites in all factors of the Syrian government. Despite increased Sunni-Alawite tensions, Syria remained stable until the Syrian civil war.

During the Syrian civil war, the Assad government deployed mostly Alawite soldiers, and also conscripted Alawites. The mass conscriptions disproportionately targeted Alawite regions. The conscriptions resulted in many young Alawite men dying, and caused suffering to the Alawite region along the Syrian coast. There were increased tensions between the Alawite community and the Assad government. Regardless, many Alawites felt as if Assad was the only option, fearing that an opposition victory would lead to mass killings of Alawites, especially after the rise of Sunni Islamism among the opposition. Alawites were described as being "hostage" to Assad. (This fear would indeed come to pass with the 2025 massacres of Syrian Alawites.) Over 100,000 young Alawite men were killed in combat by 2020.

In 2016, Alawite religious leaders published a statement publicly disassociating the Alawite community from the Assad government. They also called for unity between all Syrians, and referred to Sunnis, Shias, and Alawites as "brothers and sisters". They stated that Alawites existed before the Assad regime "and will exist after it", and that Alawites "should not be associated with the crimes the regime has committed".

Alawites had also opposed Iranian intervention in Syria and complained that Iran was a threat to the Alawite faith due to its Shia conversion campaigns in the Alawite regions with tacit approval of the Assad government.

The Assad administration faced increasing opposition from the Alawite community as the Syrian civil war progressed.

Bashar al-Assad attempted to integrate Alawites into Sunni Islam as to alleviate Sunni opposition to his rule, while Hafez al-Assad entirely dismissed the Alawite faith as simply Twelver Shi'ism. Alawites insisted that they were a distinct Islamic sect, while accusing Hafez al-Assad and Bashar al-Assad of undermining the Alawite faith throughout their rule. Syrian school textbooks published under Bashar al-Assad did not mention the Alawite faith.

After the 2024 Homs offensive led by Tahrir al-Sham, many Alawites expressed relief as they were not targeted by HTS. Ahmed al-Sharaa assured minorities of safety during the 2024 Syrian opposition offensives. After the Assad family hometown of Qardaha was captured by the opposition, HTS met with Alawite religious elders of the town and received their support. It was alleged that Bashar al-Assad acquired support from Alawites primarily via fearmongering, and that he otherwise would have been unpopular among them.

Amid the 2025 massacres of Syrian Alawites, a cleric with membership in the Alawite Islamic Council denounced what he said was the spurious conflation of Alawites in general with "remnants of the former regime".

== See also ==
- Syrian opposition to Bashar al-Assad
- Shia opposition to the Islamic Republic of Iran
