= Irreligion in Iran =

Some irreligious Iranians

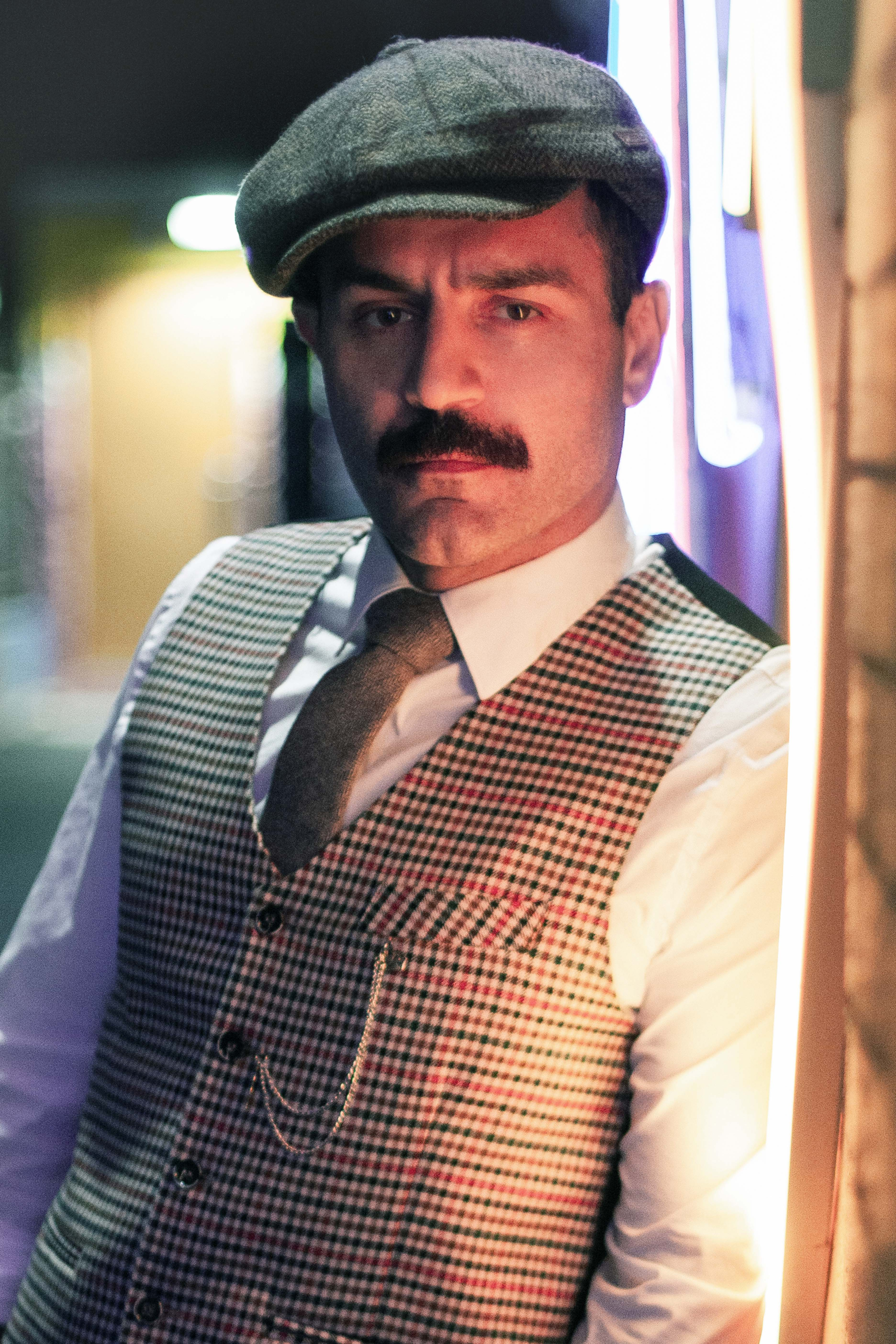
Shahin Najafi

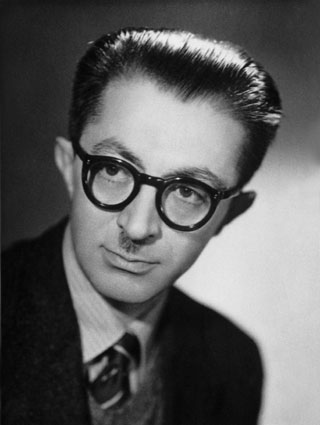
Sadegh Hedayat

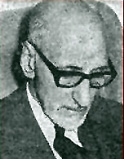
Ali Dashti

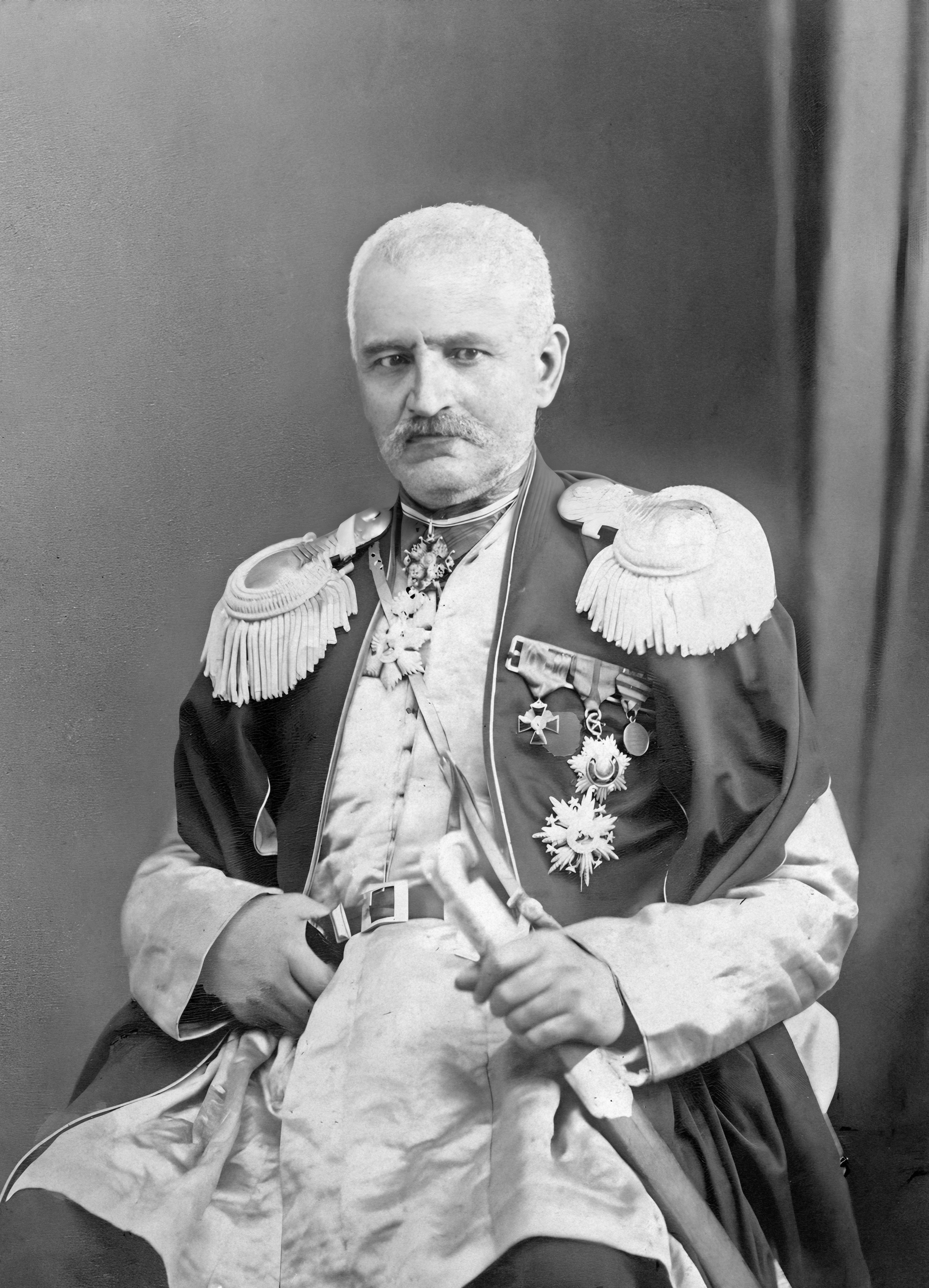
Mirza Fatali Akhundov

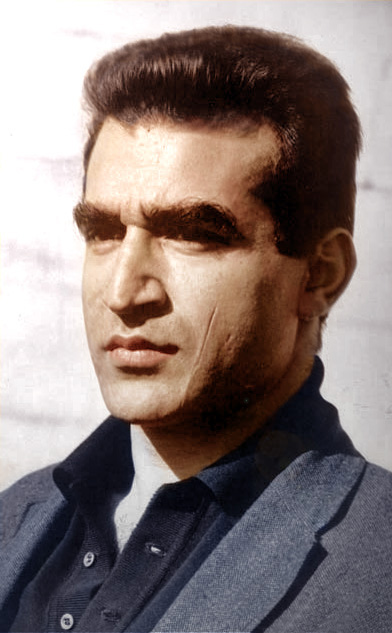
FM-2030

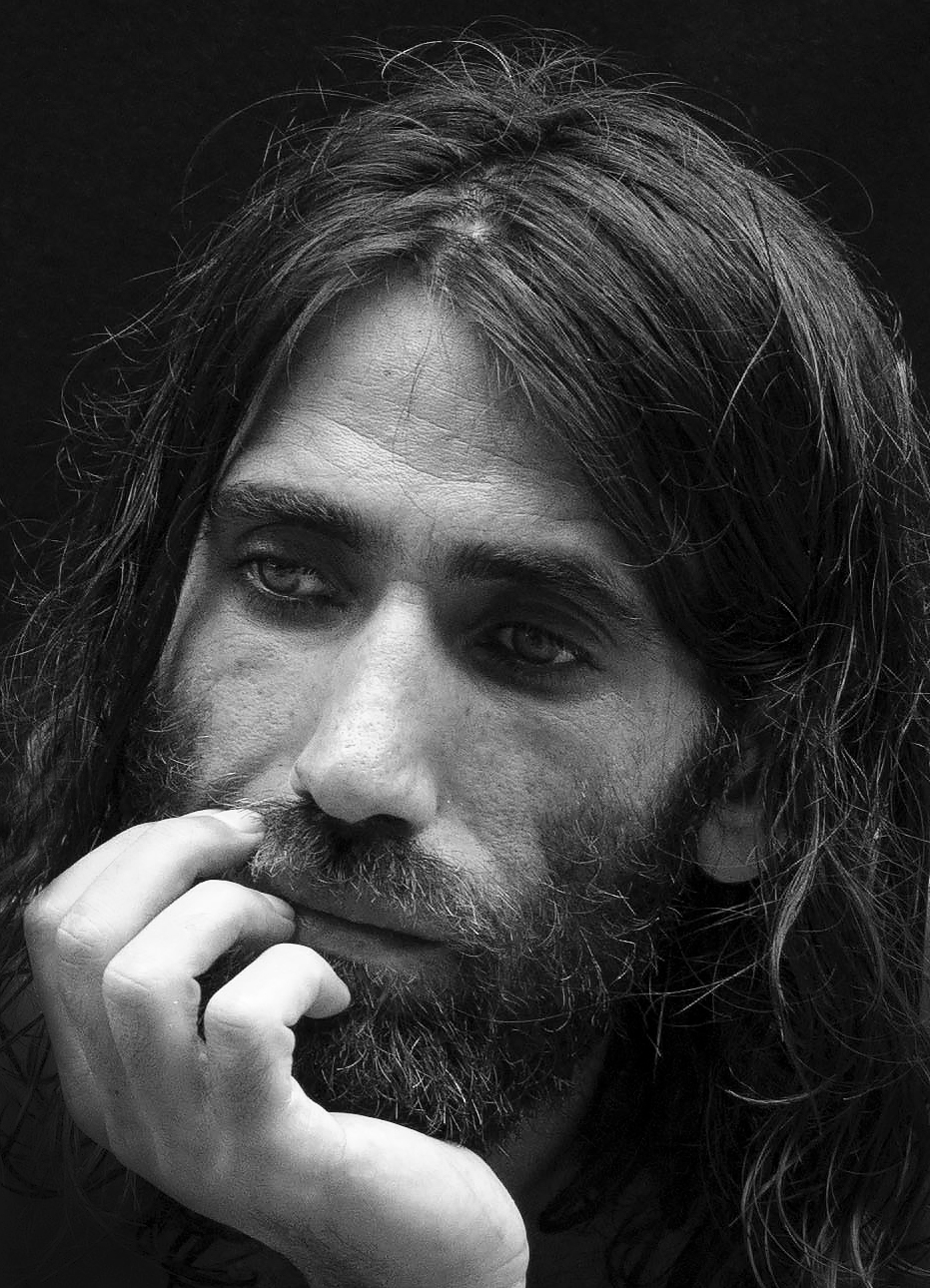
Behrouz Boochani

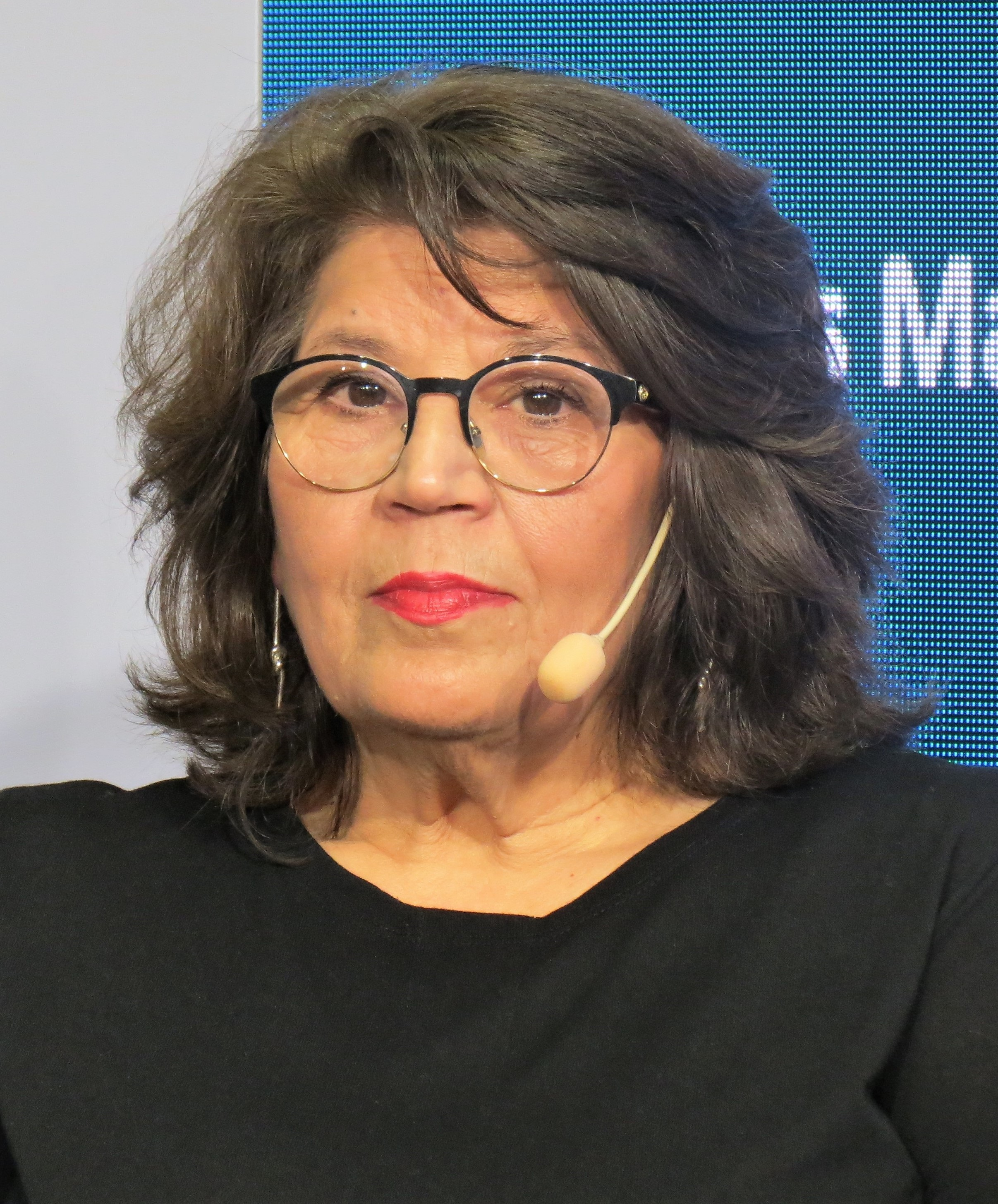
Jila Mossaed

Religion in Iran (2011)
1. Islam (99.4%)
2. other (Note: Christian: 117,704 Zoroastrian: 25,272 Jewish: 8,756 other: 49,101 No answer: 205,317) (0.60%)

Irreligion in Iran has a long historical background. Non-religious citizens are officially unrecognized by the Iranian government. In the official 2011 census, 265,899 persons did not state any religion (0.3% of total population). Between 2017 and 2022, the World Values Survey found that 96.6% of Iranians identified as Muslims, with 1.3% of Iranians identifying as atheists. In the 1999-2004 cycle, the WVS had found 1% of Iranians had identified as atheists.

However, a 2020 social media-based survey conducted by GAMAAN found a much larger percentage of Iranians identifying as atheists (8.8%), as well as a larger fraction of Iranians (22.2%) identifying as not following any religion. Nonetheless, the reliability of the survey has been questioned, as it used self-selecting participants reached through social media and chain referrals. For comparison, the same survey put the number of Muslims in Iran at 40.4%, and Zoroastrians at 7.7%. The Federation of Zoroastrian Associations of North America put the number of Zoroastrians in Iran at up to 25,271 in 2012, equivalent to 0.03% of an 87.6 million population.

Under Iranian law, apostasy from Islam is punishable by death (although not practiced much). Non-religious Iranians are officially unrecognized by the government, and one must declare oneself as a member of one of the four recognized faiths in order to avail oneself of many of the rights of citizenship.

Citizens of the Islamic Republic of Iran are officially divided into four categories: Muslims, Zoroastrians, Jews and Christians. This official division ignores other religious minorities in Iran, notably the agnostics, atheists and Bahá'ís.

== History ==
The oldest document referring to atheists in Iran, dates back to Zoroaster era where in Avesta, they are referred to as "Ashmoghs", which literally means heretics, apostates, or more precisely atheists.

In Islamic Iran there were also instances of opposition to organised religion. In the 10th century AD, the famous Persian scientist Rhazes famously opposed religion and the divine revelation of prophets in his treatises Fī al-Nubuwwāt (On Prophecies) and Fī Ḥiyal al-Mutanabbīn (On the Tricks of False Prophets).

Further skepticism of the ideas of God could be seen in the quatrains of Omar Khayyam where the compassion of God and the ideas of afterlife are continuously questioned. This work was also written in the 10th century.

Under the Pahlavi dynasty from 1925 until the Iranian Islamic revolution of 1979, atheism was promoted, taught and tolerated, though not officially accepted. With the Bolshevik Revolution in Russia (the northern neighbour of Iran), the Iranian communist Tudeh Party enjoyed considerable popularity among educated urban Iranians especially in the late 1940s and 1960s, and atheism (a tenet of Marxism–Leninism) grew in popularity. For example, Karo Derderian, the Armenian-Iranian poet and brother to the famous singer Viguen, famously wrote poetry rejecting both God and religion.

=== After the Islamic revolution ===
Even when atheism was tolerated by the Iranian governments, the vast majority of people in Iran have remained religious. However, with the Islamic revolution, irreligion became a political issue, and a disorder to be suppressed by Muslims.

Mehdi Bazargan wrote that "to view Islam as an opposition to Iranian nationalism is tantamount to destroying ourselves. To deny Iranian identity and consider nationalism irreligious is part and parcel of the anti-Iranian movement and is the work of the anti-revolutionaries".

=== Contemporary ===
Religion in Iran (GAMAAN July 2023 Online Social Media Survey)
1. Muslim (Note: Includes: Shi’a (37.9%), Sunni (4.9%), and Sufi (1.0%).) (43.8%)
2. Belief in God without religion (17.3%)
3. Humanist (16.1%)
4. Irreligious (Note: Includes: None (6.6%), Atheist (6.5%), and Agnostic (1.6%).) (14.7%)
5. Zoroastrian (2.80%)
6. Other (Note: Includes: Christian (0.5%), Baháʼí (0.2%), Jewish (0.1%), Yarsan (0.3%), Spiritual (1.6%), other religions (2.9%).) (5.30%)

According to the Ali Reza Eshraghi, the problem with today's Iranian society is that few political or religious critics are willing to recognise or understand the "popular religion". In other words, both the Islamic regime and its opposing elites are not fond of the manners in which the laymen practice religion. Therefore, instead of relying on empirical observation they prefer to simply speculate about the religiosity of this very complex society. Measuring religiosity is not a simple task. The criteria are different among the social scientists. In 2012 only, Iranian scholars held thirteen sessions in Tehran to discuss the criteria. The limited research on this matter suggests that Iranian society is still a religious one. A study in 2009, conducted by two Iranian sociologists – Abbas Kazemi and Mehdi Faraji – conclude that in comparison to 1975, four years before the revolution, Iranians are still considerably very religious. The number of Iranians who pray or participate in socio-religious rituals has remained relatively unchanged. The number of people who fast has even increased. At the same time, as another sociologist Amir Nikpey says, Iranians have become modern and secular "without becoming anti-religion".

Some Iranian feminists have also been noted as being irreligious and atheistic.

Patriotic Iranian youth who fought and died in the Iran–Iraq War were often noted in Islamic religious zeal and nationalism, and the Iranian youth are among the most politically active among the countries of the Islamic world. As the most restive segment of Iranian society, the young also represent one of the greatest long-term threats to the current form of theocratic rule. After the 2009 presidential election, youth was the biggest bloc involved in the region's first sustained "people power" movement for democratic change, creating a new political dynamic in the Middle East. Iran is one of the most tech-savvy societies in the developing world, with an estimated 28 million Internet users, led by youth. Most young Iranians are believed to want to be part of the international community and globalization.

== Persecution ==
Iran was reported by The Washington Post to be among the thirteen countries where atheism can attract capital punishment. The last noted legal execution for apostasy in Iran was in 2014, when Mohsen Amiraslani was convicted and executed for making "innovations in religion" and insulting the Prophet Jonah.

== List of irreligious Iranians ==
- Armin Navabi – ex-Shia Muslim atheist and secular activist, author, podcaster and vlogger including founder of Atheist Republic
- Ashraf Dehghani – Iranian female communist revolutionary, and is a member of the Iranian People's Fedai Guerrillas
- Aramesh Dustdar – philosopher, writer, scholar and a former philosophy lecturer at Tehran University
- Afshin Ellian – Iranian-Dutch professor of law, philosopher, poet, and critic of political Islam. He is an expert in international public law and philosophy of law
- FM-2030 – Belgian-born Iranian-American author, teacher, transhumanist philosopher, futurist, consultant and athlete
- Hadi Khorsandi – contemporary Iranian poet and satirist. Since 1979, he has been the editor and writer of the Persian-language satirical journal Asghar Agha
- Shahin Najafi – Iranian actor, musician, singer and songwriter
- Maryam Namazie – British-Iranian secularist and human rights activist, commentator, and broadcaster
- Mina Ahadi – Iranian-Austrian political activist
- Sadegh Hedayat – Iranian writer, translator and intellectual, best known for his novel The Blind Owl

== Among the Iranian diaspora ==
=== Iranian Americans ===
A significant number of Iranian-Americans are irreligious. According to Harvard University professor Robert D. Putnam, the average Iranian-American is slightly less religious than the average American. In the book, Social Movements in 20th Century Iran: Culture, Ideology, and Mobilizing Frameworks, author Stephen C. Poulson adds that Western ideas are making Iranians irreligious.

A 2012 national telephone survey of a sample of 400 Iranian-Americans in the Los Angeles area, commissioned by the Public Affairs Alliance of Iranian Americans and conducted by Zogby Research Services, asked the respondents what their religions were. The survey had a cooperation rate of 31.2%. Additionally, the number of Muslim Iranian-Americans decreased from 42% in 2008 to 31% in the 2012 survey.

=== European Iranians ===
The Central Committee for Ex-Muslims was founded by Dutch-Iranian Ehsan Jami with an aim to support apostates and to bring attention to women's rights violations.

A British-Iranian organisation, Iranian Atheists Association, was established in 2013 to form a platform for Iranian atheists to start debate and question the current Islamic republic’s attitude towards atheists, apostasy and human rights.

== See also ==
- Atheism
- Christianity in Iran
- Demographics of Iran
- Freedom of religion in Iran
- Islam in Iran
- Religion in Iran
- Secularism in Iran
- Zoroastrianism
