= Hamgami for a Secular Democratic Republic in Iran =

Iranian political coalition

Hamgami for a Secular Democratic Republic in Iran (همگامی برای جمهوری سکولار دموکرات در ایران, literally "in step together") is a coalition of five Iranian republican opposition parties and organisations, formed on 9 March 2023. Its stated goal is the establishment of a secular democratic republic in Iran. Its members are the Union of Iranian Republicans, the National Front of Iran–Europe, the Left Party of Iran, the organisations of the National Front of Iran abroad, and the Union for Secular Republic and Human Rights in Iran.

== Formation ==
On 9 March 2023, the five parties announced that, after a period of close cooperation and common positions on events in Iran, they were upgrading their relations and entering into a coalition. Their announcement included an attachment setting out their views on the political situation in Iran and the Woman, Life, Freedom movement, and said they would publish their common views and hold a press conference in early 2023.

The coalition's Fundamental Principles, a ten-point charter, were published on 31 March 2023. A press conference at the Central Library of the University of London followed on 3 April 2023, with Mahmoud Jafari of the National Front of Iran–Europe, Behrooz Khaligh of the Left Party of Iran, Maryam Satvat of the Union of Iranian Republicans, Mahdieh Golrou of the Union for Secular Republic and Human Rights in Iran, and Homayoun Mahmanesh of the National Front organisations abroad.

== Principles ==
The Fundamental Principles commit the coalition to a democratic republic with separation of powers, an independent judiciary and media, rotation of power, an elected parliament and president, territorial integrity, decentralisation and equal ethnic rights, and separation of religion from the state. They call for equal citizens' rights and implementation of the Universal Declaration of Human Rights, with women's rights at the centre and no discrimination on grounds including sexual orientation; the release of political prisoners, freedom of parties, media, belief, expression and assembly, and the abolition of the death penalty. They also cover economic development and the fight against corruption, social security and welfare, the environmental crisis, national solidarity through equal rights and the free use of all languages of Iran with Persian as the common language, and a foreign policy based on peace, non-interference and normal relations with all countries, including the United States and Israel.

== Reactions ==
A group of political activists, most of them signatories of a statement by 673 secular democratic republicans, welcomed the coalition as a step towards forming a republican pole in Iran. The People's Mojahedin Organization of Iran also welcomed it. The reformist activist Ehsan Houshmand criticised the founding statement in the newspaper Shargh for not using the term "the Iranian nation", calling the phrase used, "the people of Iran", vague. The coalition's secretariat wrote to Shargh assuring the paper that its members believed in the concept of the Iranian nation and promising to use the term in the charter, but Shargh declined to publish the letter.

== Activities ==
Through Hamgami, the five organisations joined a letter of 18 March 2024 to the UN Fact-Finding Mission on Iran, concerning the suppression of protesters. Hamgami was one of five republican blocs that issued a joint declaration on 22 June 2026.
