= Constitutionalist Party of Iran =

Constitutionalist Party of Iran – Liberal Democrat حزب مشروطه ایران–لیبرال دموکرات
- Abbreviation: CPI–LD
- Secretary-General: Fouad Pashaie
- Founder: Dariush Homayoon
- Founded: 1994
- Headquarters: Los Angeles, United States
- Ideology: Constitutional monarchism Liberalism (Iranian); Pahlavism
- National affiliation: National Council of Iran

Website
- irancpi.net

Constitutionalist Party of Iran – Liberal Democrat (حزب مشروطه ایران–لیبرال دموکرات, Hezb-e Mashruteh-ye Irân–Liberâl Demokrât) is an Iranian monarchist political party in exile. It was founded in 1994 by exiled supporters of the former Pahlavi dynasty, notably former minister Dariush Homayoon, with the aim of restoring a constitutional monarchy in Iran. The party condemns the 1979 Islamic Revolution and advocates the return of the monarchy under Crown Prince Reza Pahlavi in a liberal democratic system.

Fouad Pashaie (also spelled Foad Pashai) has served as Secretary-General of the CPI since the mid-2000s, after Homayoun’s tenure. The party is headquartered in Los Angeles and operates primarily through the Iranian diaspora.

== History ==
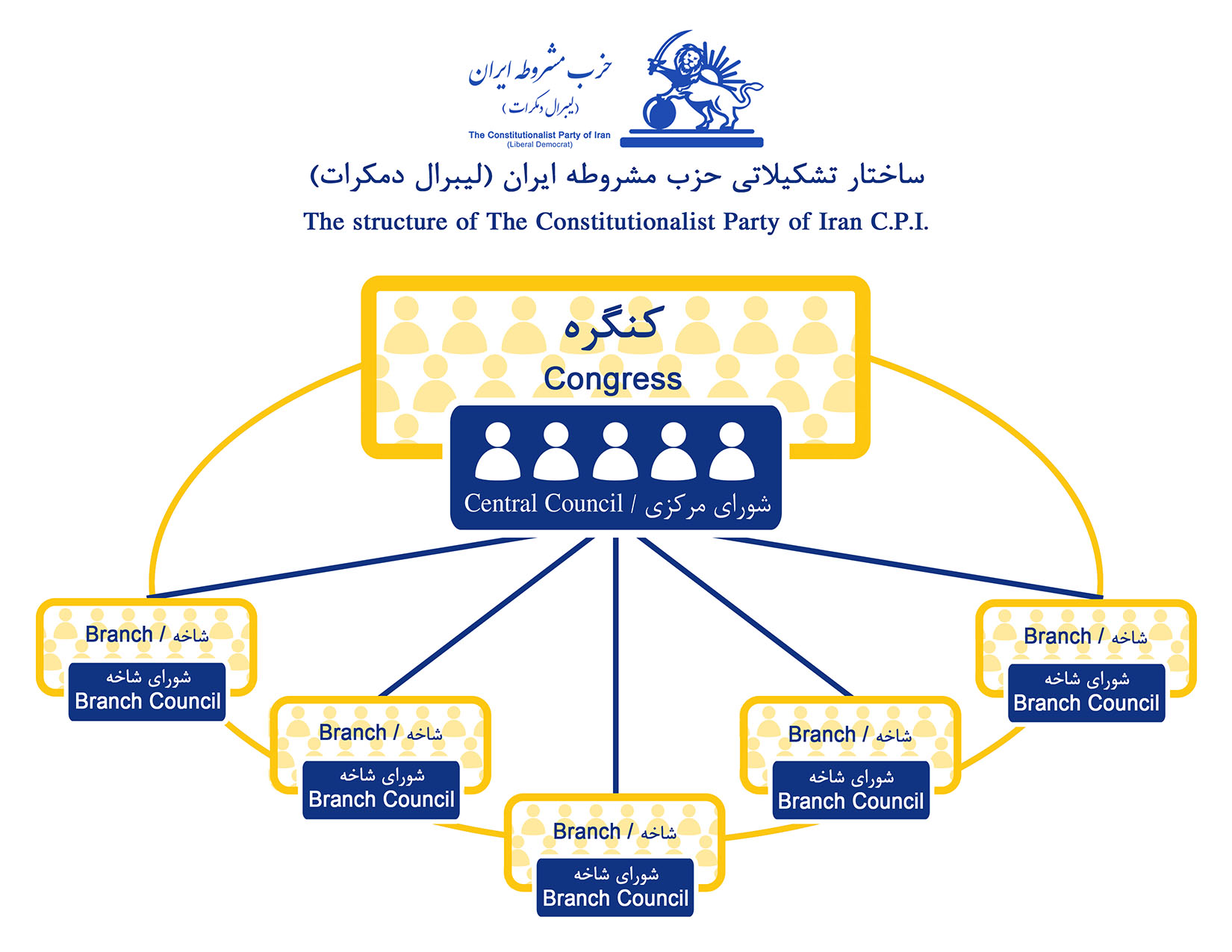
Organizational structure of the Constitutionalist Party of Iran (Liberal Democrat)

The Constitutionalist Party of Iran traces its roots to the early 1990s Persian monarchist movement in exile. After two years of preparatory work by a founding committee, the party was formally established at a conference on 9–10 April 1994 in Cologne, Germany, under the name "Organization of Iranian Constitutionalists" (Sazman-e Mashruteh Khahan-e Iran). The party’s co-founder and first leader was Dariush Homayoon, a former minister of information during the reign of Mohammad Reza Shah.

Homayoun guided the CPI's development toward a platform of constitutional monarchy combined with secular liberal democracy. In 2004, he stepped aside from active leadership, with Fouad Pashaie elected as Secretary-General. Homayoun remained an influential elder figure until his death in 2011.

In 2013, the party joined the umbrella organization the National Council of Iran, initiated by Reza Pahlavi to unify opposition groups for democratic change.

In 2019, Secretary-General Haideh Tavackoli reaffirmed the party’s commitment to a peaceful democratic transition at the CPI’s annual conference. By 2020, Fouad Pashaie returned as Secretary-General.

== Ideology and platform ==
The CPI describes itself as a constitutional monarchist and liberal democratic organization. It advocates for the restoration of a constitutional monarchy alongside democratic governance, human rights, secularism, and the rule of law.

The party draws historical inspiration from the 1906 Persian Constitutional Revolution and modernization efforts during the Pahlavi era.

== Activities and alliances ==
Operating among the Iranian diaspora, the CPI organizes advocacy campaigns, political forums, and international media engagements.

In 2022, the CPI was among twelve Iranian opposition organizations that signed a joint statement endorsing Reza Pahlavi and calling for national unity.

Within Iran, the party is banned, and public association with it can result in persecution. The CPI also co-authored an open letter to future U.S. President Joe Biden in 2020, urging support for Iran’s democratic movement.
