= Hassan Shariatmadari =

Iranian opposition leader (born 1947)

- حسن شریعتمداری
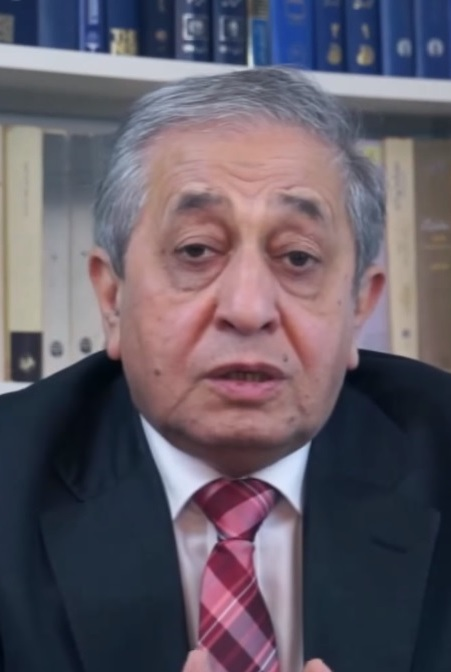
- Shariatmadari in July 2015
- Born: 26 May 1947 (age 79); Tabriz, Imperial State of Iran
- Education: Sharif University of Technology; University of Tehran
- Occupations: Politician, activist
- Political party: United Republicans of Iran (2004–present); Muslim People's Republic Party (1979–1980)
- Father: Mohammad Kazem Shariatmadari

Hassan Shariatmadari (born 1947) is an Iranian politician and dissident. He is the founder and leader of the Union of Iranian Republicans (UIR) since 2004. He is one of the leading figures of the Iranian opposition to the Islamic Republic of Iran.

The son of Kazem Shariatmadari who was a leading critic of Ruhollah Khomeini and died under house arrest in 1986, Shariatmadari later fled to Hamburg, Germany and founded the UIR. He is a proponent of the Free Elections Movement for Iran.

== Early life and family ==
Hassan Shariatmadari was born in Tabriz, Iran. He is the son of Grand Ayatollah Kazem Shariatmadari, a leading Shia cleric critical of Ruhollah Khomeini and died under house arrest in 1986.

Shariatmadari holds two master's degrees, one in Physics from Aryamehr University of Technology (currently Sharif University of Technology) and one in Law from Tehran University. In parallel to his university studies, he studied theology and philosophy at the Qom Shia Seminary and is intimately familiar with Islamic jurisprudence. In June 2013, he gave a series of Persian-language webinars on the role of free and fair elections in transitioning democracies for Tavaana: E-Learning Institute for Iranian Civil Society.

== Political career ==
During the Pahlavi regime, he supported his father's position that the Shah's authority should be limited to what had been specified in the Constitutional revolution of 1906 and that a democratic parliament should be in charge of running the country instead of the monarchy taking an active role in ruling Iran. Between 1973 and 1980 he served as the Chief Editor of Payame Shadi and Nasle Now monthly magazines for children and youth.

At the time of the Iranian revolution of 1979, Shariatmadari co-founded the Iranian People's Republican Party (IPRP). A firm believer in the separation of religion and politics, his movement resisted the establishment of the Velayat-e faqih (Rule of the Jurist) system in Iran and was violently crushed by the Iranian revolutionary guard and the Basij in 1980 after which he went into exile. At its height, IPRP was able to mobilize more than a million people in the Azarbayjan province of Iran to protest against Khomeini's rule.

In 1983, Shariatmadari joined forces with several nationalist and center leftist groups to form the National Republicans of Iran, a coalition aimed at uniting a broad range of secular forces under a common political umbrella organization. In 2004, he joined other secular political leaders of the opposition in the formation of Union of Iranian Republicans (UIR), once the largest coalition of Iranian opposition groups after the revolution. The URI envisioned Iran as a democratic republic with constitutional guarantees of civil, political, social rights and individual liberties, separation of religion and state, sustainable social development, gender equality, rights of minorities, and increased local decision-making authority, and supported a non-violent struggle path towards democracy.

== Personal life ==
Hassan Shariatmadari is married, has three children, and lives in Hamburg, Germany.
