= United Republicans of Iran =

United Republicans of Iran اتحاد جمهوری‌خواهان ایران
- Spokesperson: Hassan Shariatmadari
- Founded: 2004; 22 years ago
- Headquarters: Berlin, Germany
- Ideology: Secularism; Social democracy
- National affiliation: Solidarity for a Secular Democratic Republic in Iran

Party flag

Website
- jomhouri.com

The Union of Iranian Republicans or United Republicans of Iran (Persian: اتحاد جمهوری‌خواهان ایران, romanized: Ettehād-e Jomhuri-khāhān-e Iran) is a secular political organization founded in 2004 by Iranian leftist activists in exile. They are classified as part of the democratic republican opposition groups, whose members are not exclusively made up of former Marxists, but substantial numbers of them are.

In 2011, the Organization of Iranian Republicans split from this organization.
