= M. Hakan Yavuz =

M. Hakan Yavuz (born 24 April 1964) is a Turkish political scientist and historian, a scholar of contemporary Islamic and Turkish studies.

== Early life and education ==
Yavuz was born in Bayburt, Turkey in 1964. Kazım Yavuz, his father, was a political activist and teacher who was graduated from the Ernis (Van) Village Institutes and led numerous cooperative projects to develop rural area economy and infrastructure. Yavuz obtained his Bachelor of Arts in political science at Faculty of Political Science, Ankara University (Mektep-i Mülkiye) in 1987. He received his master's from the University of Wisconsin-Milwaukee. He spent one semester in 1989 at the Hebrew University of Jerusalem to complete his master thesis that compared the works of Michael Oakeshott and Michael Walzer. He earned his Ph.D. in political science from the University of Wisconsin-Madison in 1998. He received a two-year MacArthur Foundation scholarship to carry out research on the localization of Islam in the Fergana Valley of Uzbekistan as well as in eastern Turkey. His dissertation titled Islamic Political Identity in Turkey was published by the Oxford University Press in 2003.

== Academic career ==
Yavuz began his academic career at Bilkent University in 1996 while he was completing his dissertation. After spending one year there, he joined the University of Utah as an assistant professor in 1998. He held a joint appointment in the university's Department of Political Science and the Middle East Center. Yavuz was a Kroc Institute For International Peace Study Fellow at the University of Notre Dame in 2001 followed by his one-year fellowship at the University of California-Irvine in 2000. He taught as a visiting professor at Sarajevo University in Bosnia, Waseda University in Tokyo, Manas University in Biskek, the Central European University in Budapest and Australian National University in Canberra.

Since 2009, Yavuz runs the Turkish Studies Project funded by Turkish Coalition of America, one of the main purposes of which is to deny that the Armenian genocide constituted a genocide. Yavuz wrote that "there was no genocide, but rather local responses to the Armenian provocations, the guerrilla tactics on the side of the occupying Russian army, and the rebellions in different parts of Anatolia".

In The Torn Republic: Turkey's Search for Civilizational Identity (2026), M. Hakan Yavuz describes the Erdoğan era as a shift toward neopatrimonial, increasingly personalized rule. He identifies the 2013 Gezi Park protests as a turning point that hardened Erdoğan's leadership into a more explicitly authoritarian order. Yavuz argues that the collapse of the AKP's alliance with the Gülen movement and the failure of the Kurdish peace process together drove the displacement of the party's earlier "conservative democracy" rhetoric by a combination of authoritarian nationalism and Islamist populism. Turkey's foreign policy increasingly came to revolve around "beka sorunu" (the perceived existential survival of the state) becoming less a strategic doctrine than an instrument of regime preservation. Yavuz sets the government's official rhetoric of "strategic autonomy" against what he calls "authoritarian symbiosis". He contends that under Erdoğan, foreign policy decisions have been driven more by regime maintenance, personalized decision-making, and transactional bargaining than by any coherent, autonomous strategy.

== Publications ==
=== Authored books ===
- with Michael Gunter, The Karabakh Conflict Between Armenia and Azerbaijan: Causes & Consequences (New York: Palgrave, 2022).
- with Erdi A. Erturk, Kemal Kılıçdaroğlu and the New Republican People’s Party in Turkey (New York: Palgrave, 2023).
- Erdoğan: The Making of an Autocrat (Edinburgh University Press, 2021).
- Islamic Political Identity in Turkey (Oxford University Press, 2003; 2005).
- Secularism and Muslim Democracy in Turkey (Cambridge: Cambridge University Press, 2009).
- Toward and Islamic Enlightenment: The Gülen Movement (New York: Oxford University Press, 2013).
- Nostalgia for the Empire: The Politics of Neo-Ottomanism (Oxford University Press, 2020). https://global.oup.com/academic/product/nostalgia-for-the-empire-9780197512289?q=M.%20Hakan%20Yavuz&lang=en&cc=us
- The Torn Republic: Turkey's Search for Civilizational Identity (Oxford University Press, 2026). https://global.oup.com/academic/product/the-torn-republic-9780197848272?q=M.%20Hakan%20Yavuz&lang=en&cc=us

=== Edited books ===
Yavuz is co-editor of a three-volume edition on the disintegration of the Ottoman Empire:

- with Peter Sluglett, eds., War and Diplomacy: The Russo-Turkish War of 1877-1878 and the Treaty of Berlin (Salt Lake City: The University of Utah Press, 2011).
- with Isa Blumi, eds., War and Nationalism: The Balkan Wars, 1912–1913, and Their Sociopolitical Implications (Salt Lake City: The University of Utah Press, 2013).
- with Feroz Ahmad, eds, War and Collapse: World War I and the Ottoman State (Salt Lake City: The University of Utah Press, 2015).

His other edited books include:

- with Bayram Balci, eds. Turkey’s July 15th Coup: What Happened and Why? (Salt Lake City: The University of Utah Press, 2017).
- The Emergence of a New Turkey: Democracy and AK Parti (Salt Lake City: The University of Utah Press, 2006).
- with John Esposito eds., Turkish Islam and the Secular State: The Gülen Movement (Syracuse University Press, 2003).
- with Ahmet Erdi Ozturk eds., Islam, Populism and Regime Change in Turkey: Making and Re-making the AKP (Routledge, 2020).
- with Michael Gunter, Shamkal Abiov, eds. Heydar Aliyev and the Foundations of Modern Azerbaijan (New York: Palgrave-Macmillan, 2024).
- Michael Gunter, eds. The Nagorno-Karabakh Conflict: Historical and Political Perspectives (New York: Routledge, 2023).
- with Erdi A. Ozturk, eds. Erdoğan’s Turkey: Islamism, Identity and Memory (New York: Routledge, 2021).
- with Erdi A. Ozturk, eds. Islam, Populism and Regime Change in Turkey (New York: Routledge, 2019).
