= Shia opposition to the Islamic Republic of Iran =

Shia opposition to the Islamic Republic of Iran refers to Shia Muslims who oppose the Islamic Republic of Iran, a Shia Islamist theocracy based on Khomeinism, established after the 1979 Iranian Revolution.

== Religious authenticity ==
The traditional Twelver Shia view was to keep clerics away from political and governmental positions. Velayat-e Faqih is a Twelver Shia concept which holds that at least partial religious and social affairs of the Muslims need to be administered by a righteous and qualified Shia faqīh until the appearance of the Mahdi. However, not all Twelver Shias believe in Velayat-e Faqih. Within the community of Velayat-e Faqih, there are disputed opinions about the limits of the Faqih, with some supporting absolute authority, and some supporting limited authority for those who needed the guardianship of the Faqih. Velayat-e Faqih later became associated with Ruhollah Khomeini, who supported absolute authority. After the Iranian revolution, Khomeini implemented his interpretation of Velayat-e Faqih in Iran, causing religious disagreements between Shias. Traditionally, Shia jurists stated that Velayat-e Faqih "meant no more than legal guardianship of senior clerics over those deemed incapable of looking after their own interests — minors, widows, and the insane." They also believed that political rule was to be left to Shia rulers, who should only use their rule to defend the territory, maintain public stability, and righteously distribute the khums.

Shias who opposed Velayat-e Faqih claimed that implementation of Velayat-e Faqih over the general public puts sane independent adults in the same category as incapable people who could not act without a guardian to protect their interests. They also claimed that Shia Muslims who sought religious guidance should seek it from the Marja.

Ali al-Sistani is a conservative traditionalist Shia cleric popular in Iraq. Sistani opposed the concept of Velayat-e Faqih, and criticised Iranian interference in Iraq, claiming that even if Iran was ruled by Velayat-e Faqih, the Iranian government did not have authority over Iraqi Shias. Sistani claimed that ruling should be the "role of Islam as providing values and guidelines for social order", rather than political rule. Although Sistani opposed Velayat-e Faqih, he was reluctant to engage in a rivalry with Iran. However, Sistani had sometimes openly criticised Velayat-e Faqih.

There was a minority view, which asserted that a senior faqih had the right to enter political disputes, but only if the leader was absent, or if the leader had oppressed the nation.

Mohammad Kazem Shariatmadari favored the traditional view that clerics should avoid politics, and was in conflict with the government of Khomeini.

Subhi al-Tufayli claimed that Velayat-e Faqih was not a real Islamic concept, but an excuse for the Iranian government to continue its tyrannical policies.

Senior clerics who opposed Velayat-e Faqih include Bashir al-Najafi, Muhammad al-Fayadh, Muhammad Saeed al-Hakim, and Mohammad Hussein Fadlallah.

Sadiq al-Shirazi criticised the Iranian interpretation of Velayat-e Faqih and how it gave all control to a single Faqih, making him virtually impossible to remove from power. Hussein al-Shirazi, in a lecture in Qom, criticised Velayat-e Faqih and compared Ali Khamenei to the Pharaoh, causing his arrest.

== Other opposition ==
Although the People's Mojahedin Organization of Iran fought against the monarchy, it later fought against the Islamic Republic as well, and attempted to overthrow Khomeini on June 20, 1981. Khomeini regarded the Mojahedin as an anti-Islamic organization that posed a grave threat to the foundations of Islam and the authority of clerical rule. This hostile religious framing had profound implications for the group’s supporters, providing the theological justification for a series of campaigns aimed at their suppression and extermination. These oppressive developments intensified during the 1981–1982 Iran Massacres, where the Islamic Republic targeted its opposition. The PMOI later declared war against the Islamic Republic and its government. Many moderate Iranian Shias also opposed the Islamic Republic, including Mir Hossein Mousavi, Mehdi Karroubi, and Hussein-Ali Montazeri.

Muqtada al-Sadr opposed Nouri al-Maliki due to his ties with Iran, causing the Mahdi Army to rebel against the Iraqi government in 2006. Although Muqtada al-Sadr has studied in Iranian seminaries, and was exiled in Iran, he opposed the Iranian regime. Unlike Iran-backed Shia militias, the Sadrist Movement was more nationalist and rejected Iranian interference in Iraq.

Subhi al-Tufayli, a Lebanese Shia cleric and former Hezbollah leader, was very critical of Iran and Hezbollah. The Tufayli faction of Hezbollah was more independent, while the Nasrallah faction was Pro-Iran. Later, with Iranian support, Hassan Nasrallah became the leader of Hezbollah. The main dispute between the Tufayli and Nasrallah factions was over Tufayli insisting on shunning Lebanese politics and focusing on fighting Israel in South Lebanon, which the Nasrallah faction had downplayed. After armed clashes between the Tufayli and Nasrallah factions, Tufayli was expelled from Hezbollah in 1998. Subhi al-Tufayli was a fierce opponent of Iran and Hezbollah, and had called for Lebanese Shia action against Iran. Tufayli stated that the Iranian government "built their politics on Persian identity. They exploited sectarianism for the benefit of their Persian project. They deceive the Shia in Lebanon, Syria, Iraq and everywhere else telling them 'you are minorities in Sunni areas' and this is not true."

Iraqi, Kuwaiti, and Khuzestani Arab Shias largely opposed the Islamic Republic of Iran. There was also significant Lebanese Shia opposition towards the Islamic Republic of Iran. Azerbaijani Shias also largely opposed the Islamic Republic of Iran, due to historic ethnic tensions, as well as the efforts of the secular government of Azerbaijan.

== See also ==
- Alawite opposition to the Assad regime
- War of Brothers
