= Secularism in Iran =

Secularism in Iran was established as state policy shortly after Rezā Shāh was crowned Shah in 1925. He made any public display or expression of religious faith, including the wearing of the headscarf (hijab) and chador by women and wearing of facial hair by men (with the exception of the mustache) illegal. Public religious festivals (such as Muharram and Ashura) and celebrations were banned, Shia clergy were forbidden to preach.

Although criticised by the religious traditionalists and viewed as authoritarian by foreign observers, Reza Shah intended to secularise Iran and eliminate the influence of the Shi'a clergy upon the government and the society. During his reign, the first instances of Islamic extremism and terrorism appeared in Iran as a backlash against his secularist policies. For example, secularist politicians and writers such as Ahmad Kasravi were assassinated by Muslim extremists, the most notorious of which remains Navvab Safavi, who today is considered a hero by the government of the Islamic Republic of Iran.

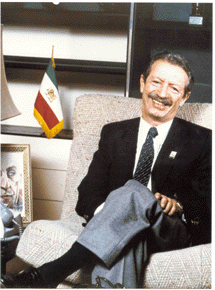
Shapour Bakhtiar, Iran's last secular prime minister.

After Reza Shah was forcibly deposed and sent into exile by British and Soviet forces with the Anglo-Soviet invasion of Iran, the era of secularism in Iran ended. From 1941 until 1953, democracy was properly restored to Iran, but the Shi'a clergy also were able to return to their previous level of power and influence because of their primary base of support in rural parts of central Iran.

After 1953, the Iranian government, while becoming less and less democratic, also increasingly took steps to restore Reza Shah's authoritarian policies and eliminate the influence of the Shi'a clergy and organised religion from the government and public life. In the late 1960s, Mohammad Reza Pahlavi had forced the Shi'a clerical novitiates to attend public state-run universities in order to gain religious certification and license to preach, similar to Catholic and Christian schools of theology. Mohammad Reza Shah also began taking steps in the 1970s to exclude Shi'a clergy from participating in the Parliament and to impose restrictions on public displays of religion and religious observance.

Both Reza Shah and Mohammad Reza Shah took much inspiration from the post-revolutionary French and Classical American political schools of thought which advocate separation of religion and state, and both blamed the British for the rise of Islamism and radical Islam in Iran and the Middle East. For this reason Pahlavi Iran vigorously pursued close relations with France and the United States. In 1979, after the deposition of the government of Prime Minister Shapour Bakhtiar in February of that year, an interim government was established under Prime Minister Mehdi Bazargan which sought to establish a nationalist Islamic democratic government with pro-free market economic policy, in opposition to the wishes of Ayatollah Ruhollah Khomeini and his pro-Islamic Republic faction. Bazargan's government resigned en masse in November 1979 immediately after the US Embassy takeover by radicalist students.

The end of Bazargan's government officially marked the end of state-directed secularism in Iran. In February 1980 the Islamic Republican Party established the current theocratic government of Iran, with Ayatollah Khomeini as Supreme Leader of Iran.

Secular opposition to the Islamist government of the Islamic Republic of Iran had been active in the country up until 1984, afterwards they were branded heretics and apostates by the clerical hierarchy, and eventually jailed, executed or exiled.

== Recent developments ==
A 2020 Online Survey by Gamaan found that 8.8% Iranians identifying as Atheist and a large fraction (22.2%) identifying as not following an organized religion and only 40% self identified as Muslims. The findings have been cited as evidence of growing secularization in Iranian society. In 2022, Iran's Deputy Interior Minister, Taghi Rostamvandi, warned about the surge in demand by Iranian people for adoption of a secular constitution.

The Mahsa Amini protests (2022-23) were seen as a sign of growing demand among Iranians for a secular Iran. In a November 2022 poll by Group for Analyzing and Measuring Attitudes in Iran (GAMAAN), almost three-quarters of Iranians opposed mandatory hijab; of this population, 84% prefer a secular Iranian state to theocracy, which GAMAAN characterized as an endorsement of regime change.

== Secularist politicians and figures of Iran ==
- Reza Shah
- Mohammad Mosaddegh
- Ahmad Kasravi
- Dariush Forouhar
- Shapour Bakhtiar
- Fazlollah Zahedi
- Dariush Homayoon
- Mohammad Reza Pahlavi
- Amir-Abbas Hoveyda
- Reza Pahlavi, Crown Prince of Iran

== See also ==
- Irreligion in Iran
