= Mohammad Reza Pahlavi =

Shah of Iran from 1941 to 1979

- King of Kings; Light of the Aryans; Center of the Universe
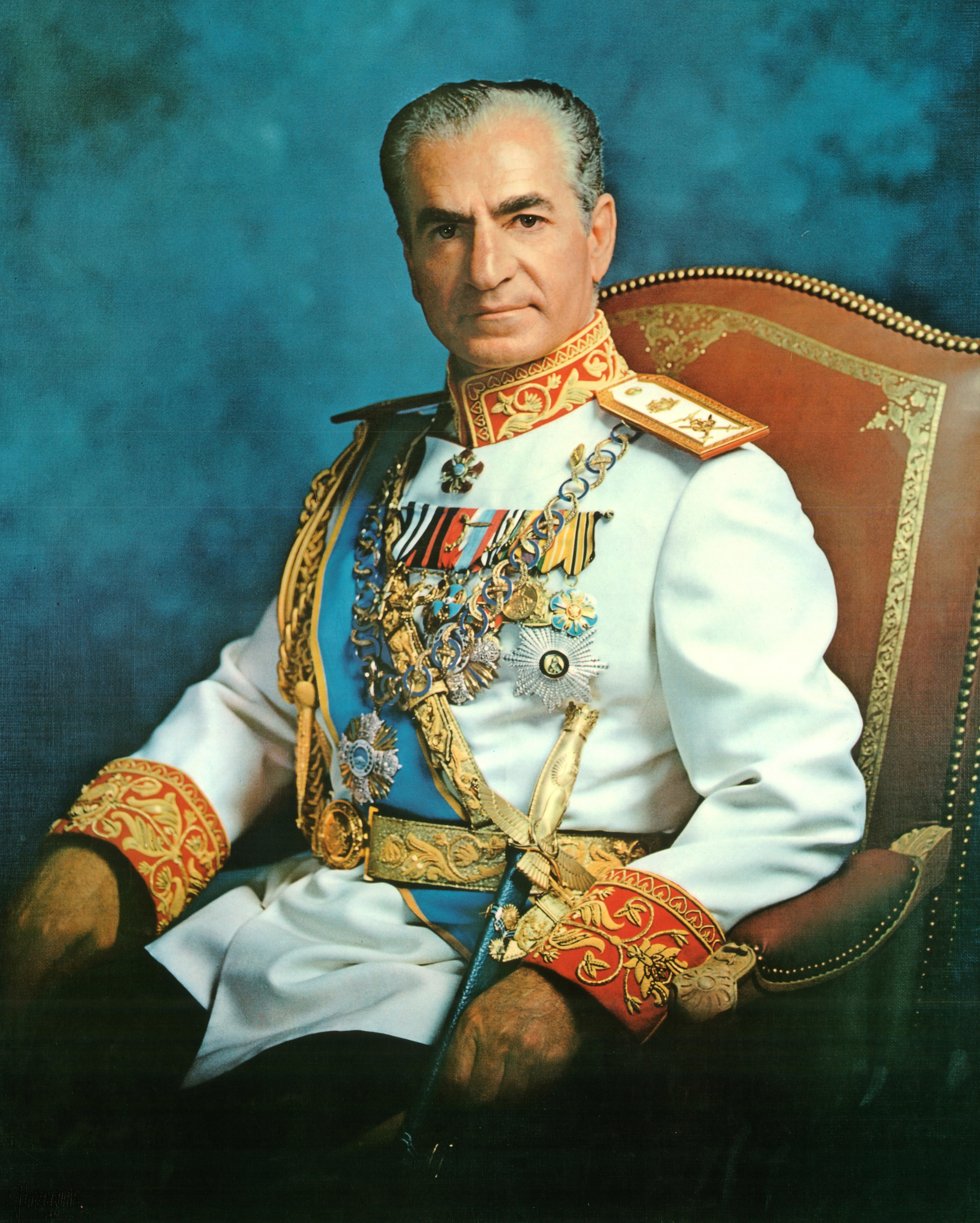
- Official portrait, c. 1973

Shah of Iran
- Reign: 16 September 1941 – 11 February 1979
- Coronation: 26 October 1967
- Predecessor: Reza Shah
- Successor: Monarchy abolished; Ruhollah Khomeini (as Leader of the Islamic Revolution)
- Born: 26 October 1919; Tehran, Iran
- Died: 27 July 1980 (aged 60); Cairo, Egypt
- Burial: 30 July 1980; Al-Rifa'i Mosque
- Spouse: Fawzia of Egypt (m. 1939; div. 1948) Soraya Esfandiary-Bakhtiary (m. 1951; div. 1958) Farah Diba (m. 1959)
- Issue: Princess Shahnaz; Crown Prince Reza; Princess Farahnaz; Prince Ali Reza; Princess Leila
Regnal name
- Mohammad Reza Shah; Persian: محمدرضا شاه
- Dynasty: Pahlavi
- Father: Reza Shah
- Mother: Tadj ol-Molouk
- Religion: Twelver Shia Islam
- Signature: Persian signature Latin signature

Personal details
- Education: Institut Le Rosey; Madrasa Nezam

Military service
- Allegiance: Pahlavi Iran
- Branch/service: Imperial Iranian Army
- Years of service: 1936–1979
- Rank: Aryamehr
- Commands: Army's Inspection Department
- Battles/wars: World War II; Anglo-Soviet invasion of Iran; Kurdish separatism in Iran; Hama Rashid revolt; Luri tribal insurgency in Pahlavi Iran; Iran crisis of 1946; 1953 Iranian coup d'état; 1962–1964 Tribal Rebellion of Fars; 1963 demonstrations in Iran; 1967 Kurdish revolt in Iran; Joint Operation Arvand; Siahkal incident; Second Iraqi–Kurdish War; 1974–1975 Shatt al-Arab conflict; Iranian Revolution
- Mohammad Reza Shah's voice Mohammad Reza Shah on the nonrenewability of oil Recorded 1971

Mohammad Reza Pahlavi (Note: /ˈreɪzə ˈpɑːləˌvi/; Persian: محمدرضا پهلوی, pronounced [mohæmˈmæd ɾeˈzɒː pʰæhlæˈviː]) (26 October 1919 – 27 July 1980) was the last Shah of Iran (Note: As such, he was commonly referred to in Western news media simply as "the Shah".), reigning from 1941 to 1979 as the second monarch of the Pahlavi dynasty. He succeeded his father, Reza Shah, and ruled the Imperial State of Iran until his overthrow in the Islamic Revolution. During his reign, he assumed the title Shahanshah (lit. 'King of Kings'), and held several other titles, including Aryamehr (lit. 'Light of the Aryans') and Bozorg Arteshtaran (lit. 'Grand Army Commander').

Born in Tehran, Pahlavi was named crown prince upon his father's coronation in 1926, and later served as an officer in the Iranian Army. The Anglo-Soviet invasion of Iran in 1941 forced Reza Shah's abdication and Mohammad Reza's accession to the throne. His early reign was marked by political instability, including the Iran crisis of 1946 and a turbulent struggle for power with prime minister Mohammad Mosaddegh, who nationalized the British-owned oil industry with widespread popular support. However, a subsequent decline in oil exports and mounting economic difficulties weakened Mosaddegh's position. Amid efforts to preserve his premiership by expanding his authority, Mosaddegh was removed from office in the 1953 Iranian coup d'état, carried out by pro-monarchy forces with British and American involvement. The coup consolidated the Shah's power, paving the way for increasingly autocratic rule.

In 1963, the Shah introduced the White Revolution, a broad program of economic and social modernisation accompanied by heavy investment in infrastructure and domestic industry, aimed at realising his vision of a "Great Civilization". Iran subsequently experienced rapid economic growth, with real GDP per capita nearly tripling between 1963 and 1976. Living standards improved substantially, although the economic benefits were unevenly distributed. With American support, the Shah undertook an extensive military buildup, establishing Iran as the preeminent military power in the Persian Gulf, and independently sought to extend the country's influence into the Indian Ocean. The 1973 Sale and Purchase Agreement effectively nationalised Iran's petroleum operations, and surging oil revenues thereafter fuelled an expansion of government investment. However, rapid spending strained the country's absorptive capacity, contributing to inflation, shortages, and persistent economic inequality.

Discontent over Iran's socioeconomic conditions and political repression fuelled growing opposition to the monarchy in the late 1970s. In January 1978, a newspaper article attacking dissident cleric Ruhollah Khomeini sparked protests that rapidly developed into nationwide demonstrations. The crisis intensified with the Cinema Rex fire, the Jaleh Square massacre, and widespread strikes beginning in October, leaving the Shah's position increasingly untenable. On 16 January 1979, the Shah left Iran for exile, transferring his duties to a regency council. Within a month, however, the monarchy collapsed, and Khomeini emerged as the supreme leader of the new Islamic republic. After encountering difficulties obtaining asylum in various countries amid the Iran hostage crisis, Pahlavi died in exile on 27 July 1980 in Egypt, where he had been welcomed by President Anwar Sadat.

Pahlavi's legacy remains divisive, reflecting his authoritarian rule, political repression, human rights violations, and close alignment with Western powers, alongside his efforts to modernize Iran's economy and enhance its geopolitical influence. Positive views of his reign have persisted among segments of the Iranian population and diaspora, becoming particularly visible during the 2025–2026 Iranian protests through pro-Pahlavi and monarchist slogans.

== Early life, family and education ==
Mohammad Reza was born on 26 October 1919 in Tehran to Reza Khan (later Reza Shah Pahlavi), a brigadier general in the Persian Cossack Brigade, and his second wife, Tadj ol-Molouk. His father was the son of Major Abbas-Ali Khan, an army officer of Mazandarani origin, and Noush-Afarin Ayromlou, whose family had emigrated to Iran from either Georgia or Yerevan in the nineteenth century following the Russo-Persian Wars. His mother was born in Baku, Russian Empire (present-day Azerbaijan), and was the daughter of Teymūr Khan Ayromlou, an Iranian army general of Ayrum descent.

Mohammad Reza was Reza Khan's eldest son and the third of his eleven children by four women. He was born alongside his twin sister, Ashraf; his other full siblings were his older sister, Shams, and younger brother, Ali Reza. His father reportedly regarded the birth of his first son as a good omen and called him khosh-ghadam (lit. 'bird of good omen'). In November 1919, following the enactment of Iran's surname law, Reza Khan adopted the surname Pahlavi, derived from the historical designation for Middle Persian. On 24 April 1926, the day before his father's coronation, six-year-old Mohammad Reza was proclaimed Crown Prince of the newly established Pahlavi dynasty.

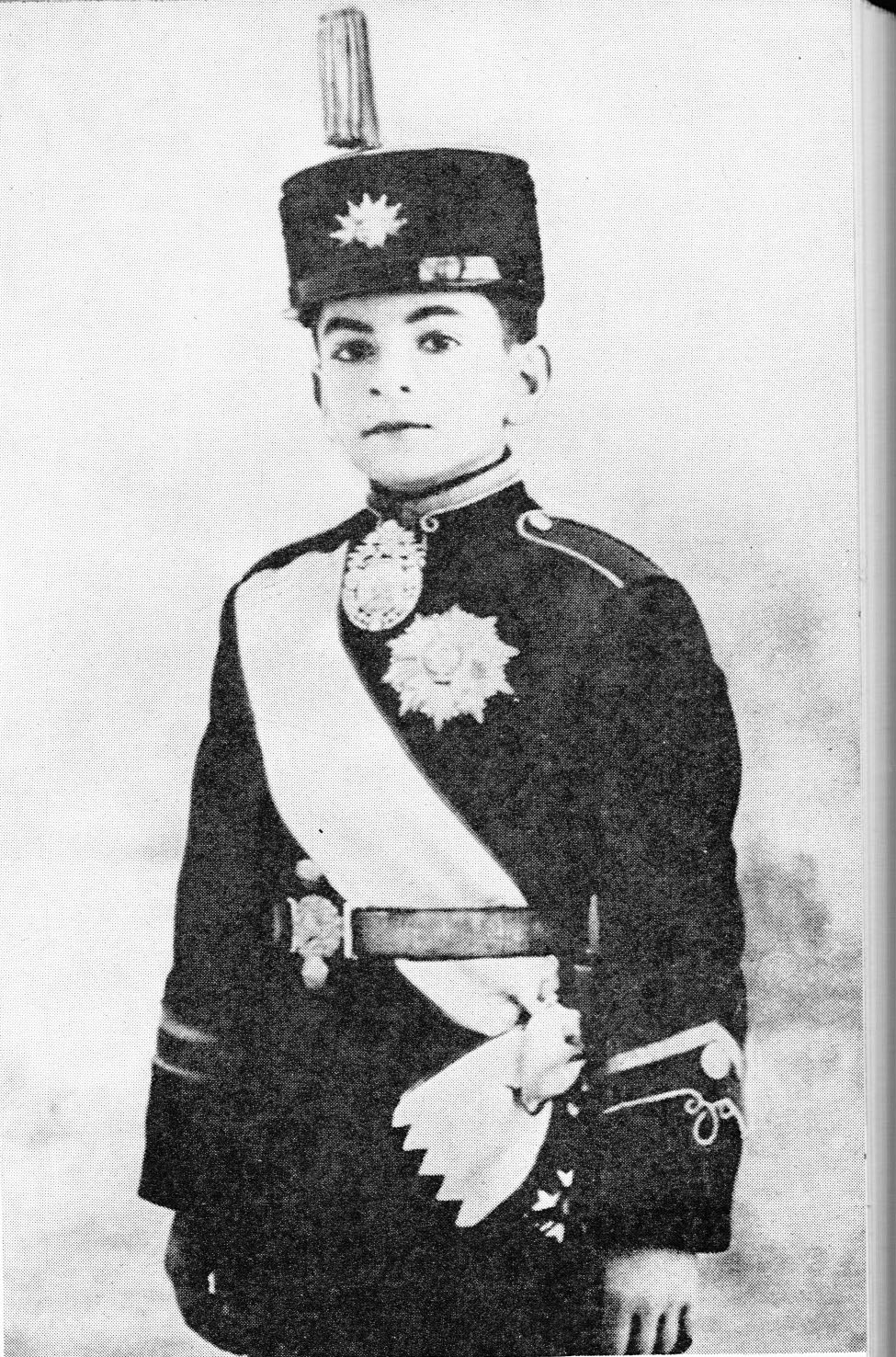
Crown Prince Mohammad Reza Pahlavi, c. 1926

Growing up, Mohammad Reza was very close to his twin sister Ashraf, who described her brother as the "centre of my existence." He also shared a close relationship with his mother, Tadj ol-Molouk, and his older sister Shams. Tadj ol-Molouk was assertive and deeply superstitious, encouraging her son's belief that he was destined for an important future. Upon becoming Crown Prince, however, he was separated from his mother and sisters and was placed under the educational supervision of military officers. Reza Shah further ordered that everyone, including his mother and siblings, address the Crown Prince as "Your Highness" (vālā-hazrat).

Mohammad Reza had a difficult relationship with his father, whom he later described in his autobiography Mission for My Country as "one of the most frightening men" he had known. Their relationship remained emotionally distant and highly formal; Reza Shah addressed his son using the formal shomā (شما) rather than the informal to (تو), both meaning "you", (Note: Similar to the tu–vous distinction in French; no exact equivalent in Modern English.) and expected the same formality in return.

=== Education ===
In 1931, at the recommendation of Minister of Court Abdolhossein Teymourtash, Reza Shah sent the Crown Prince to Institut Le Rosey, a private boarding school in Switzerland. He left Iran on 7 September 1931 and became the first Iranian heir apparent to be sent abroad for his education. His adjustment to life in Switzerland was initially difficult. Accustomed to the deference afforded to him in Iran, he reportedly demanded that fellow students stand at attention in his presence, but soon adapted to the comparatively egalitarian environment of the school. As a student, Mohammad Reza played football for the school's team.

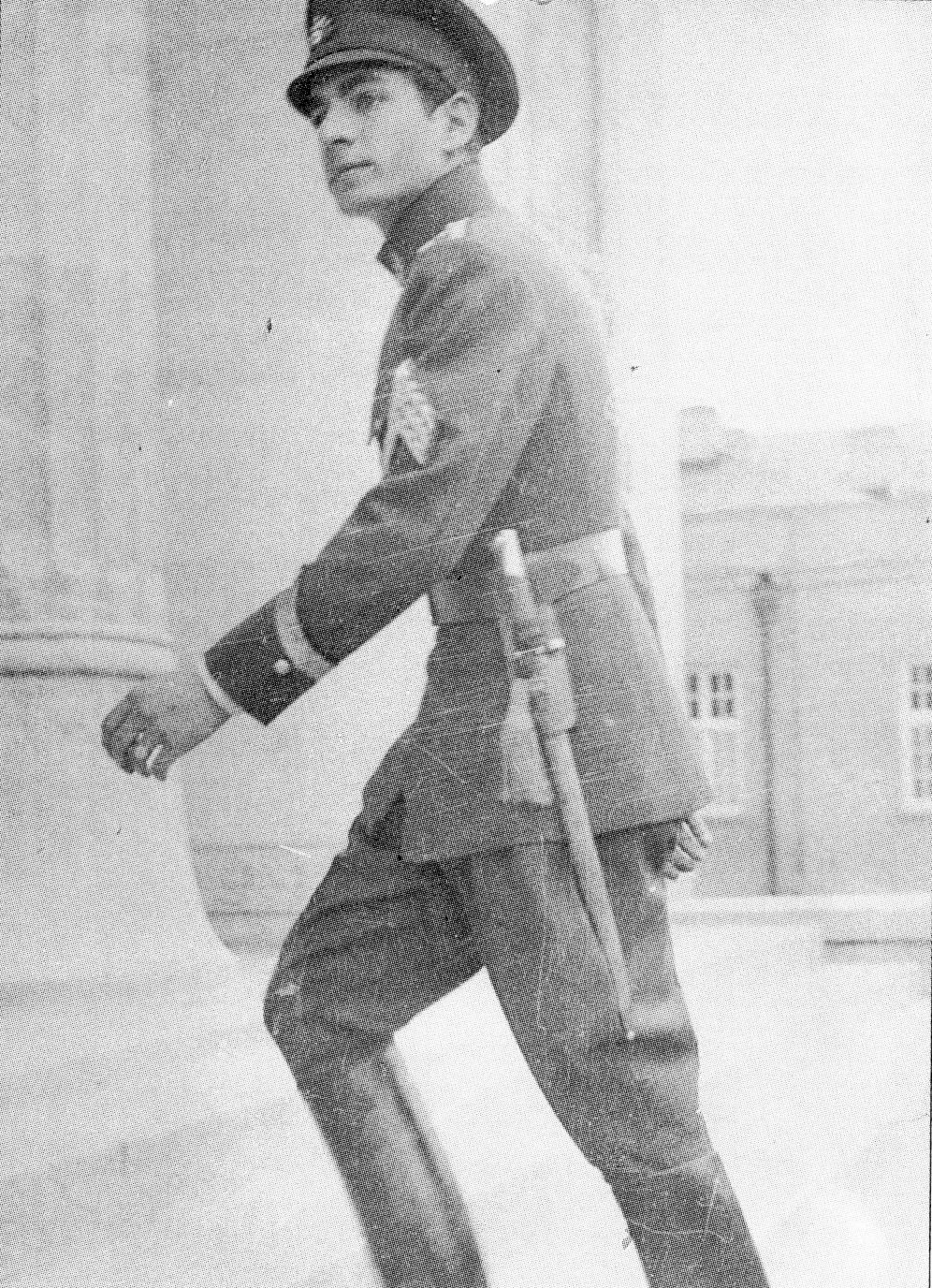
Mohammad Reza entering Madrasa Nezam, a military school in Tehran, 1938

In addition to his native Persian, Mohammad Reza learned to speak English, French, and German fluently. He developed a lasting interest in French language and culture; writing for the school newspaper in French in 1935 and 1936, he credited Le Rosey with broadening his outlook and introducing him to Western culture. He also befriended Ernest Perron, a teacher who introduced him to French literature and became one of his closest confidants. When Mohammad Reza returned to Iran in 1936, Perron accompanied him and subsequently remained associated with the royal court at the Marble Palace.

After returning to Iran, Mohammad Reza completed his secondary education and enrolled at the Madrasa Nezam, a military academy in Tehran. He graduated as a second lieutenant in 1938 and was subsequently promoted to captain, a rank he held until his accession to the throne. From 1938 to 1941, he served as an army inspector, travelling throughout Iran to examine both civil and military installations.

== Rise to power and rule as Shah ==
=== First marriage ===
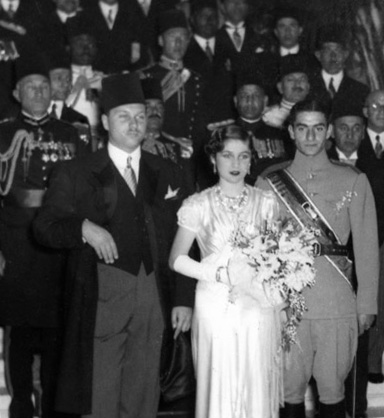
Photograph of the wedding ceremony of Crown Prince Mohammad Reza (right) and Princess Fawzia of Egypt at Abdeen Palace in Cairo, 1939

One of the main initiatives of Iranian and Turkish foreign policy had been the Saadabad Pact of 1937, an alliance bringing together Turkey, Iran, Iraq, and Afghanistan, with the intent of creating a Muslim bloc that, it was hoped, would deter any aggressors. President Mustafa Kemal Atatürk of Turkey suggested to his friend Reza Khan during the latter's visit that a marriage between the Iranian and Egyptian courts would be beneficial for the two countries and their dynasties, as it might lead to Egypt joining the Saadabad pact. Dilawar Princess Fawzia of Egypt (5 November 1921 – 2 July 2013) was daughter of King Fuad I of Egypt and Nazli Sabri, and sister of King Farouk I of Egypt. In line with Atatürk's suggestion, Mohammad Reza and the Egyptian Princess Fawzia were married on 15 March 1939 in the Abdeen Palace in Cairo. Reza Shah did not participate in the ceremony. During his visit to Egypt, Mohammad Reza was greatly impressed with the grandeur of the Egyptian court as he visited the various palaces built by Isma'il "the Magnificent" Pasha, the famously free-spending khedive of Egypt, and resolved that Iran needed similarly grandiose palaces to match them.

Mohammad Reza's marriage to Fawzia produced one child, Princess Shahnaz Pahlavi (born 27 October 1940). Their marriage was not a happy one, as the Crown Prince was openly unfaithful, often being seen driving around Tehran in one of his expensive cars with one of his girlfriends. Additionally, Mohammad Reza's dominating and possessive mother saw her daughter-in-law as a rival to her son's love, and took to humiliating Princess Fawzia, whose husband sided with his mother. A quiet, shy woman, Fawzia described her marriage as miserable, feeling very much unwanted and unloved by the Pahlavi family and longing to return to Egypt. In his 1961 book Mission for My Country, Mohammad Reza wrote that the "only happy light moment" of his entire marriage to Fawzia was the birth of his daughter.

=== Anglo-Soviet invasion and deposition of his father Reza Shah ===
Meanwhile, in the midst of World War II in 1941, Nazi Germany began Operation Barbarossa and invaded the Soviet Union, breaking the Molotov–Ribbentrop Pact. This had a major impact on Iran, which had declared neutrality in the conflict. In the summer of 1941, Soviet and British diplomats passed on numerous messages warning that they regarded the presence of Germans administering the Iranian state railroads as a threat, implying war if the Germans were not dismissed. Britain wished to ship arms to the Soviet Union via Iranian railroads, and statements from the German managers of the Iranian railroads that they would not cooperate made both the Soviets and British insistent that the Germans Reza Khan had hired be sacked at once. As his father's closest advisor, the Crown Prince Mohammad Reza did not see fit to raise the issue of a possible Anglo-Soviet invasion of Iran, blithely assuring his father that nothing would happen. The Iranian-American historian Abbas Milani wrote about the relationship between Reza Khan and the Crown Prince at the time, noting, "As his father's now constant companion, the two men consulted on virtually every decision".

Later that year, British and Soviet forces occupied Iran in a military invasion, forcing Reza Shah to abdicate. On 25 August 1941, British and Australian naval forces attacked the Persian Gulf while the Soviet Union conducted a land invasion from the north. On the second day of the invasion, with the Soviet air force bombing Tehran, Mohammad Reza was shocked to see the Iranian military simply collapse, with thousands of terrified officers and men all over Tehran taking off their uniforms in order to desert and run away, despite having not yet seen combat. Reflecting the panic, a group of senior Iranian generals called the Crown Prince to receive his blessing to hold a meeting to discuss how best to surrender. When Reza Khan learned of the meeting, he flew into a rage and attacked one of his generals, Ahmad Nakhjavan, striking him with his riding crop, tearing off his medals, and nearly personally executing him before his son persuaded him to have the general court-martialled instead. The collapse of the Iranian military that his father had worked so hard to build humiliated his son, who vowed that he would never see Iran defeated like that again, foreshadowing the future Shah's later obsession with military spending.

=== Ascension to the Sun throne ===
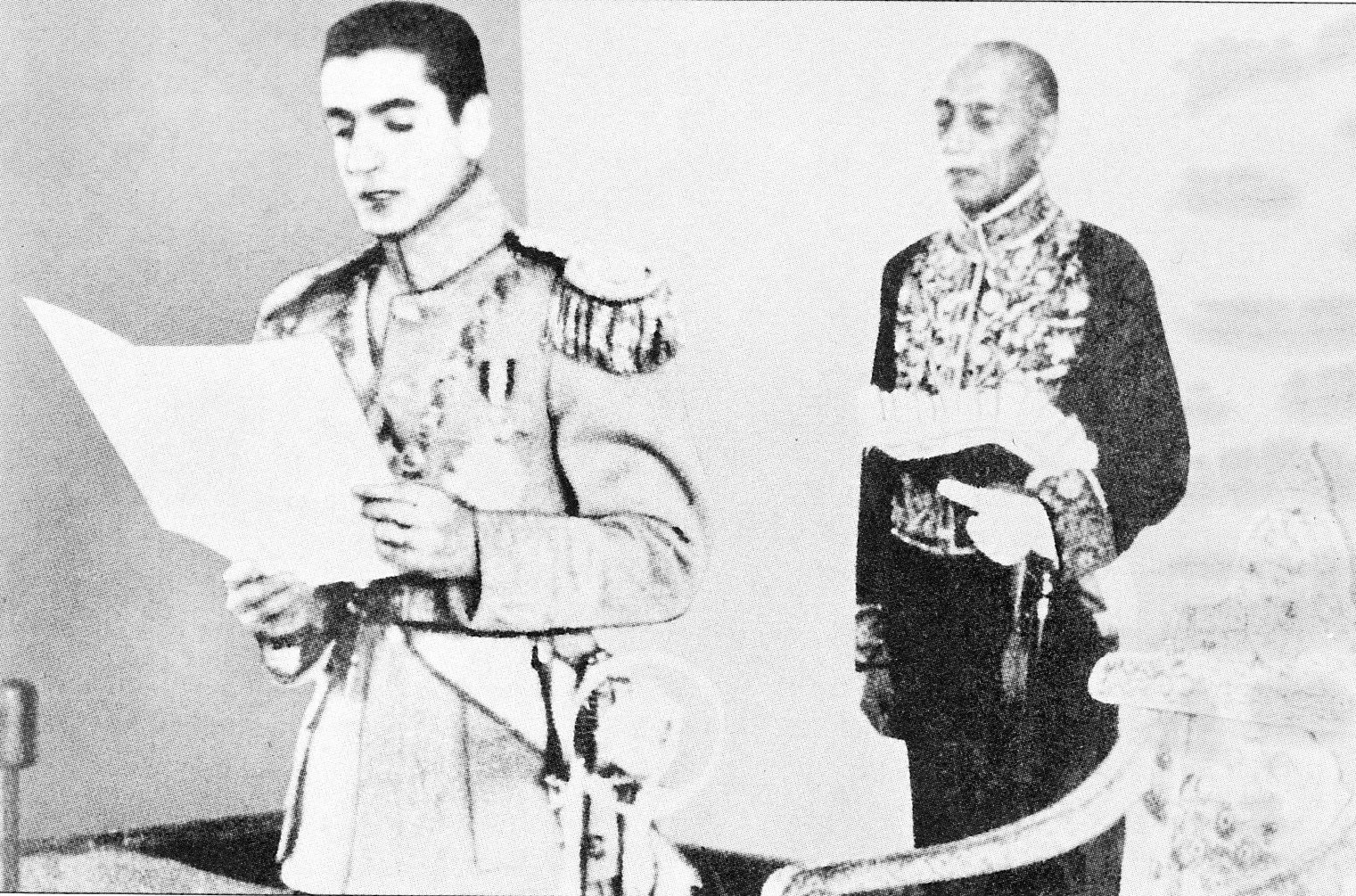
The inauguration of Mohammad Reza as Shah of Iran in the National Assembly, 17 September 1941

On 16 September 1941, Prime Minister Mohammad Ali Foroughi and Foreign Minister Ali Soheili attended a special session of parliament to announce the resignation of Reza Shah and that Mohammad Reza was to replace him. The next day, at 4:30 p.m., Mohammad Reza took the oath of office and was received warmly by parliamentarians. On his way back to the palace, the streets filled with people welcoming the new Shah jubilantly, seemingly more enthusiastic than the Allies would have liked. The British would have liked to put a Qajar back on the throne, but the principal Qajar claimant to the throne was Prince Hamid Mirza, an officer in the Royal Navy who did not speak Persian, so the British were forced to accept Mohammad Reza as Shah. The main Soviet interest in 1941 was to ensure political stability to ensure Allied supplies, which meant accepting Mohammad Reza's ascension to the throne. Subsequent to his succession as king, Iran became a major conduit for British and, later, American aid to the USSR during the war. This massive supply route became known as the Persian Corridor.

Much of the credit for orchestrating a smooth transition of power from the King to the Crown Prince was due to the efforts of Mohammad Ali Foroughi. Suffering from angina, a frail Foroughi was summoned to the Palace and appointed prime minister when Reza Shah feared the end of the Pahlavi dynasty once the Allies invaded Iran in 1941. When Reza Shah sought his assistance to ensure that the Allies would not put an end to the Pahlavi dynasty, Foroughi put aside his adverse personal sentiments for having been politically sidelined since 1935. The Crown Prince confided in amazement to the British minister that Foroughi "hardly expected any son of Reza Shah to be a civilized human being", but Foroughi successfully derailed thoughts by the Allies to undertake a more drastic change in the political infrastructure of Iran.

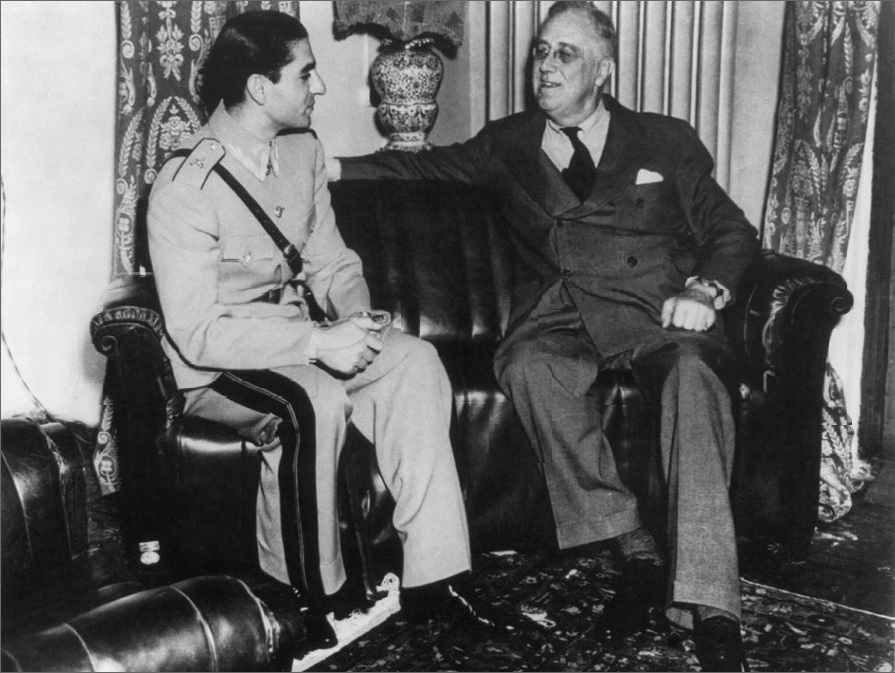
The Shah meeting with U.S. president Franklin D. Roosevelt during the Tehran Conference in 1943, two years following his father's forced abdication during the Anglo-Soviet invasion of Iran

A general amnesty was issued two days after Mohammad Reza's accession to the throne on 19 September 1941. All political personalities who had suffered disgrace during his father's reign were rehabilitated, and the forced unveiling policy inaugurated by his father in 1935 was overturned. Despite the young king's enlightened decisions, the British minister in Tehran reported to London that "the young Shah received a fairly spontaneous welcome on his first public experience, possibly rather [due] to relief at the disappearance of his father than to public affection for himself". During his early days as Shah, Mohammad Reza lacked self-confidence and spent most of his time with Perron writing poetry in French.

In 1942, Mohammad Reza met Wendell Willkie, the Republican candidate for the US presidency in the 1940 election who was now on a world tour to promote his "one world" policy. Willkie took the Shah flying for the first time. The prime minister, Ahmad Qavam, had advised the Shah against flying with Willkie, saying he had never met a man with a worse flatulence problem, but the Shah took his chances. Mohammad Reza told Willkie that when he was flying that he "wanted to stay up indefinitely". Enjoying flight, Mohammad Reza hired the American pilot Dick Collbarn to teach him how to fly. Upon arriving at the Marble Palace, Collbarn noted that "the Shah must have twenty-five custom-built cars ... Buicks, Cadillacs, six Rolls-Royces, a Mercedes". During the Tehran Conference with the Allied forces in 1943, the Shah was humiliated when he met Joseph Stalin, who visited him in the Marble Palace but did not allow the Shah's bodyguards to be present, with the Red Army alone guarding them.

=== Relationship with exiled father ===
Despite his public professions of admiration in later years, the Shah had serious misgivings about not only the coarse and roughshod political means adopted by his father, but also his unsophisticated approach to affairs of state. The young Shah possessed a decidedly more refined temperament, and amongst the unsavory developments that "would haunt him when he was king" were the political disgrace brought by his father on Teymourtash, the dismissal of Foroughi by the mid-1930s, and Ali Akbar Davar's suicide in 1937. An even more significant decision that cast a long shadow was the disastrous and one-sided agreement his father had negotiated with the Anglo-Persian Oil Company (APOC) in 1933, one which compromised the country's ability to receive more favourable returns from oil extracted from the country.

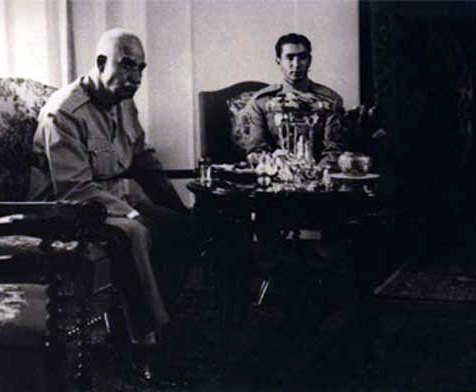
Crown Prince Mohammad Reza with his father, Reza Shah, September 1941

Mohammad Reza nevertheless expressed concern for his exiled father, who had previously complained to the British governor of Mauritius that living on the island was both a climatic and social prison. Attentively following his life in exile, Mohammad Reza would object to his father's treatment to the British at any opportunity. The two sent letters to one another, although delivery was often delayed, and Mohammad Reza commissioned his friend, Ernest Perron, to hand-deliver a taped message of love and respect to his father, bringing back with him a recording of his voice:

My dear son, since the time I resigned in your favour and left my country, my only pleasure has been to witness your sincere service to your country. I have always known that your youth and your love of the country are vast reservoirs of power on which you will draw to stand firm against the difficulties you face and that, despite all the troubles, you will emerge from this ordeal with honour. Not a moment passes without my thinking of you and yet the only thing that keeps me happy and satisfied is the thought that you are spending your time in the service of Iran. You must remain always aware of what goes on in the country. You must not succumb to advice that is self-serving and false. You must remain firm and constant. You must never be afraid of the events that come your way. Now that you have taken on your shoulders this heavy burden in such dark days, you must know that the price to be paid for the slightest mistake on your part may be our twenty years of service and our family's name. You must never yield to anxiety or despair; rather, you must remain calm and so strongly rooted in your place that no power may hope to move the constancy of your will.

As Shah, Mohammad Reza constantly disparaged his father in private, calling him a thuggish Cossack who achieved nothing as Shah. In fact, he almost airbrushed his father out of history during his reign, to the point of implying the House of Pahlavi began its rule in 1941 rather than 1925.

=== Onset of the Cold War ===
In 1945–46, the main issue in Iranian politics was the Soviet-sponsored separatist government in Iranian Azerbaijan and Kurdistan, which greatly alarmed the Shah. He repeatedly clashed with his prime minister Ahmad Qavam, whom he viewed as too pro-Soviet. At the same time, the growing popularity of the communist Tudeh Party worried Mohammad Reza, who felt there was a serious possibility of them leading a coup. In June 1946, Mohammad Reza was relieved when the Red Army pulled out of Iran. In a letter to the Azerbaijani Communist leader Ja'far Pishevari, Stalin wrote that he had to pull out of Iran, as otherwise the Americans would not pull out of China, and he wanted to assist the Chinese Communists in their civil war against the Kuomintang. However, the Pishevari regime remained in power in Tabriz, Azerbaijan, and Mohammad Reza sought to undercut Qavam's attempts to make an agreement with Pishevari as a way of getting rid of both. On 11 December 1946, the Iranian Army, led by the Shah in person, entered Iranian Azerbaijan and the Pishevari regime collapsed with little resistance, with most of the fighting occurring between ordinary people who attacked functionaries of the Pishevari that had treated them brutally. In his statements at the time and later, Mohammad Reza credited his easy success in Azerbaijan to his "mystical power". Knowing Qavam's penchant for corruption, the Shah used that issue as a reason to sack him. By this time, the Shah's wife Fawzia had returned to Egypt. Despite efforts to persuade her to return to Iran, she refused to go back, which led Mohammad Reza to divorce her on 17 November 1948.

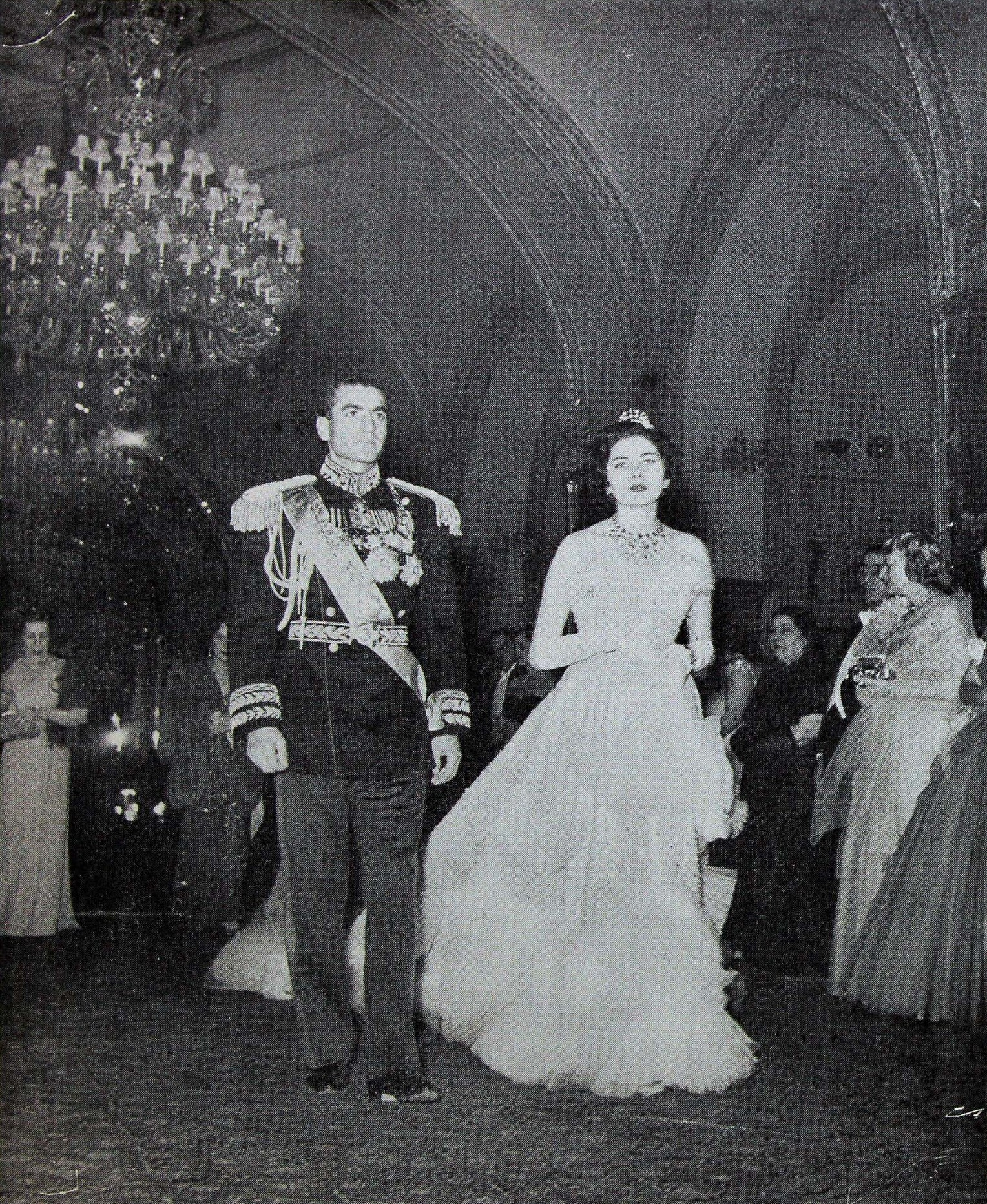
Mohammad Reza Shah and Queen Soraya at their wedding, 1951

By now a qualified pilot, Mohammad Reza was fascinated with flying and the technical details of aeroplanes, and any insult to him was always an attempt to "clip [his] wings". Mohammad Reza directed more money to the Imperial Iranian Air Force than any branch of the armed forces, and his favourite uniform was that of the Marshal of the Imperial Iranian Air Force. Marvin Zonis wrote that Mohammad Reza's obsession with flying reflected an Icarus complex, also known as "ascensionism", a form of narcissism based on "a craving for unsolicited attention and admiration" and the "wish to overcome gravity, to stand erect, to grow tall ... to leap or swing into the air, to climb, to rise, to fly".

Mohammad Reza often spoke of women as sexual objects who existed only to gratify him, and during a 1973 interview with Italian journalist Oriana Fallaci, she vehemently objected to his attitudes towards women. As a regular visitor to the nightclubs of Italy, France, and the United Kingdom, Mohammad Reza was linked romantically to several actresses, including Gene Tierney, Yvonne De Carlo, and Silvana Mangano.

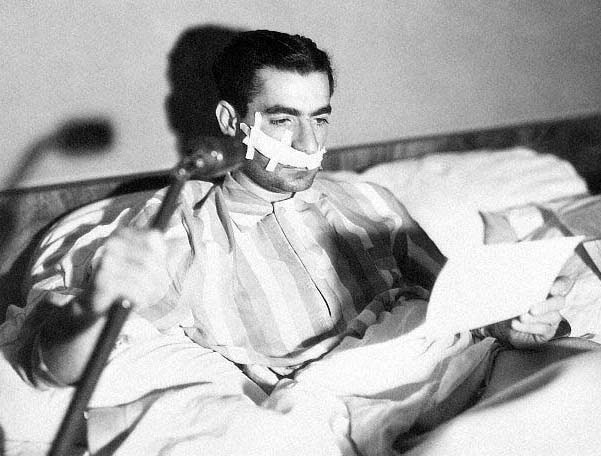
Mohammad Reza Shah in a hospital after a failed assassination attempt, 1949

At least two unsuccessful assassination attempts were made against the young Shah. On 4 February 1949, he attended an annual ceremony to commemorate the founding of Tehran University. At the ceremony, gunman Fakhr-Arai fired five shots at him at a range of about three metres. Only one of the shots hit the king, grazing his cheek. The gunman was instantly shot by nearby officers. After an investigation, Fakhr-Arai was declared a member of the communist Tudeh Party, which was subsequently banned. However, there is evidence that the would-be assassin was not a Tudeh member but a religious fundamentalist member of Fada'iyan-e Islam. The Tudeh were nonetheless blamed and persecuted.

The Shah's second wife was Soraya Esfandiary-Bakhtiary, a half-German, half-Iranian woman and the only daughter of Khalil Esfandiary-Bakhtiary, Iranian Ambassador to West Germany, and his wife Eva Karl. She was introduced to the Shah by Forough Zafar Bakhtiary, a close relative of Soraya's, via a photograph taken by Goodarz Bakhtiary, in London, per Forough Zafar's request. They married on 12 February 1951, when Soraya was 18, according to the official announcement. However, it was rumoured that she was actually 16, the Shah being 32. As a child, she was tutored and brought up by Frau Mantel, and hence lacked proper knowledge of Iran, as she herself admitted in her personal memoirs, stating, "I was a dunce—I knew next to nothing of the geography, the legends of my country, nothing of its history, nothing of Muslim religion".

=== Nationalization of oil and 1953 Iranian coup d'état ===
By the early 1950s, the political crisis brewing in Iran commanded the attention of British and American policy leaders. Following the 1950 Iranian legislative election, Mohammad Mosaddegh was elected prime minister in 1951. He was committed to nationalising the Iranian petroleum industry controlled by the Anglo-Iranian Oil Company (AIOC) (formerly the Anglo-Persian Oil Company, or APOC). Under the leadership of Mosaddegh and his nationalist movement, the Iranian parliament unanimously voted to nationalise the oil industry, thus shutting out the immensely profitable AIOC, which was a pillar of Britain's economy and provided it political clout in the region.

At the start of the confrontation, American political sympathy with Iran was forthcoming from the Truman Administration. In particular, Mosaddegh was buoyed by the advice and counsel he was receiving from the American Ambassador in Tehran, Henry F. Grady. However, eventually American decision-makers lost their patience, and by the time the Republican administration of President Dwight D. Eisenhower entered office, fears that communists were poised to overthrow the government became an all-consuming concern. These concerns were later dismissed as "paranoid" in retrospective commentary on the coup from US government officials. Shortly prior to the 1952 presidential election in the United States, the British government invited Central Intelligence Agency (CIA) officer Kermit Roosevelt Jr., to London to propose collaboration on a secret plan to force Mosaddegh from office. This would be the first of three "regime change" operations led by CIA director Allen Dulles (the other two being the successful CIA-instigated 1954 Guatemalan coup d'état and the failed Bay of Pigs Invasion of Cuba).

Under the direction of Roosevelt, the American CIA and British Secret Intelligence Service (SIS) funded and led a covert operation to depose Mosaddegh with the help of military forces disloyal to the government. Referred to as Operation Ajax, the plot hinged on orders signed by Mohammad Reza to dismiss Mosaddegh as prime minister and replace him with General Fazlollah Zahedi, a choice agreed on by the British and Americans.

Before the attempted coup, the American Embassy in Tehran reported that Mosaddegh's popular support remained robust. The Prime Minister requested direct control of the army from the Majlis. Given the situation, alongside the strong personal support of Conservative Prime Minister Winston Churchill and Foreign Secretary Anthony Eden for covert action, the American government gave the go-ahead to a committee, attended by the Secretary of State John Foster Dulles, Director of Central Intelligence Allen Dulles, Kermit Roosevelt Jr., Loy W. Henderson, and Secretary of defense Charles Erwin Wilson. Roosevelt returned to Iran on 13 July 1953, and again on 1 August 1953, in his first meeting with the king. A car picked him up at midnight and drove him to the palace. He lay down on the seat and covered himself with a blanket as guards waved his driver through the gates. The Shah got into the car and Roosevelt explained the mission. The CIA bribed him with $1 million in Iranian currency, which Roosevelt had stored in a large safe—a bulky cache, given the then-exchange rate of 1,000 rial to 15 US dollars.

Meanwhile, the Communists staged massive demonstrations to hijack Mosaddegh's initiatives, and the United States actively plotted against him. On 16 August 1953, the right wing of the Army attacked. Armed with an order by the Shah, it appointed General Fazlollah Zahedi as prime minister. A coalition of mobs and retired officers close to the Palace executed this coup d'état. They failed dismally and the Shah fled the country to Baghdad, and then to Rome. Ettelaat, the nation's largest daily newspaper, and its pro-Shah publisher, Abbas Masudi, criticised him, calling the defeat "humiliating".

During the Shah's time in Rome, a British diplomat reported that the monarch spent most of his time in nightclubs with Queen Soraya or his latest mistress, writing, "He hates taking decisions and cannot be relied on to stick to them when taken. He has no moral courage and succumbs easily to fear". To get him to support the coup, his twin sister Princess Ashraf—who was much tougher than him and publicly questioned his manhood several times—visited him on 29 July 1953 to berate him into signing a decree dismissing Mosaddegh.

In the days leading up to the second coup attempt, the communists turned against Mosaddegh. Opposition against him grew tremendously. They roamed Tehran, raising red flags and pulling down statues of Reza Shah. This was rejected by conservative clerics like Kashani and National Front leaders like Hossein Makki, who sided with the king. On 18 August 1953, Mosaddegh defended the government against this new attack. Tudeh partisans were clubbed and dispersed. The Tudeh party had no choice but to accept defeat.

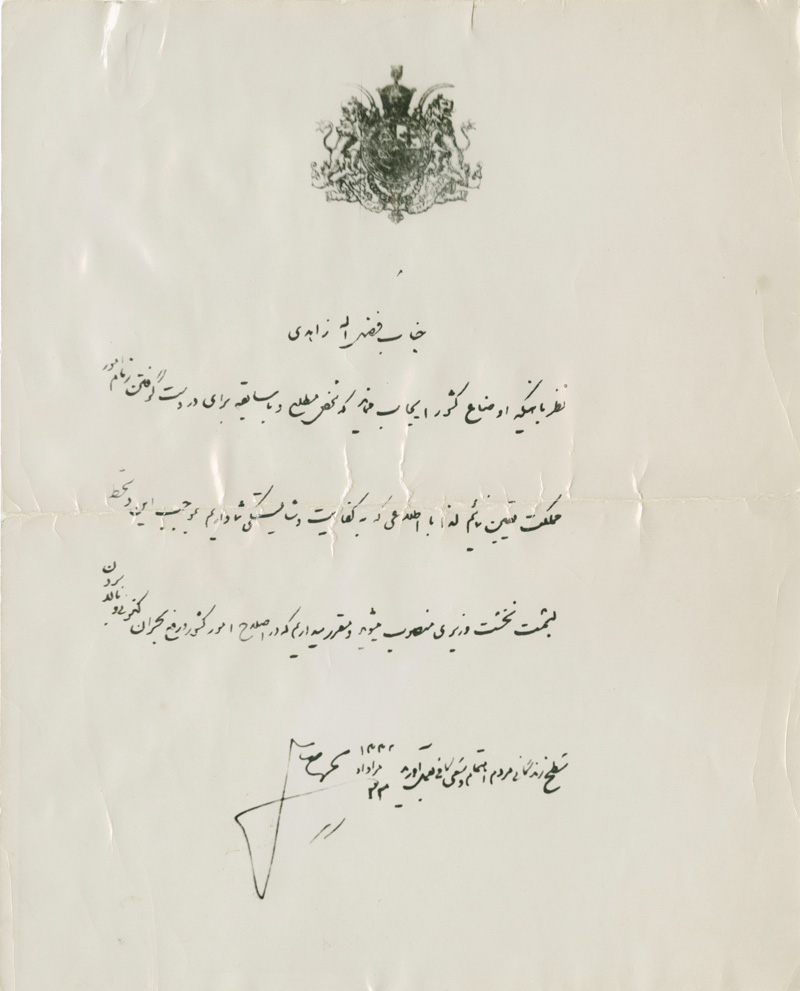
The Shah's firman naming General Fazlollah Zahedi the new prime minister. Coup operatives made copies of the document and circulated it around Tehran to help regenerate momentum following the collapse of the original plan.

In the meantime, according to the CIA plot, Zahedi appealed to the military, claimed to be the legitimate prime minister and charged Mosaddegh with staging a coup by ignoring the Shah's decree. Zahedi's son Ardeshir acted as the contact between the CIA and his father. On 19 August 1953, pro-Shah partisans—bribed with $100,000 in CIA funds—finally appeared and marched out of south Tehran into the city centre, where others joined in. Gangs with clubs, knives, and rocks controlled the streets, overturning Tudeh trucks and beating up anti-Shah activists. As Roosevelt was congratulating Zahedi in the basement of his hiding place, the new Prime Minister's mobs burst in and carried him upstairs on their shoulders. That evening, Loy W. Henderson suggested to Ardashir that Mosaddegh not be harmed. Roosevelt gave Zahedi US$900,000 left from Operation Ajax funds.

After his brief exile in Italy, the Shah returned to Iran, this time through the successful second coup attempt. The deposed Mosaddegh was arrested and tried, with the king intervening and commuting his sentence to three years, to be followed by life in internal exile. Zahedi was installed to succeed Mosaddegh. Although Mohammad Reza returned to power, he never extended the elite status of the court to the technocrats and intellectuals who emerged from Iranian and Western universities. Indeed, his system irritated the new classes, for they were barred from partaking in real power.

=== Self-assertion: from figurehead monarch to effective authoritarian ===
In the aftermath of the 1953 coup d'état, Mohammad Reza was widely viewed as a figurehead monarch, and General Fazlollah Zahedi, the Prime Minister, saw himself and was viewed by others as the "strong man" of Iran. Mohammad Reza feared that history would repeat itself, remembering how his father was a general who had seized power in a coup d'état in 1921 and deposed the last Qajar shah in 1925, and his major concern in the years 1953–55 was to neutralise Zahedi. American and British diplomats in their reports back to Washington and London in the 1950s were openly contemptuous of Mohammad Reza's ability to lead, calling the Shah a weak-willed and cowardly man who was incapable of making a decision. The contempt in which the Shah was held by Iranian elites led to a period in the mid-1950s where the elite displayed fissiparous tendencies, feuding amongst themselves now that Mosaddegh had been overthrown, which ultimately allowed Mohammad Reza to play off various factions in the elite to assert himself as the nation's leader.

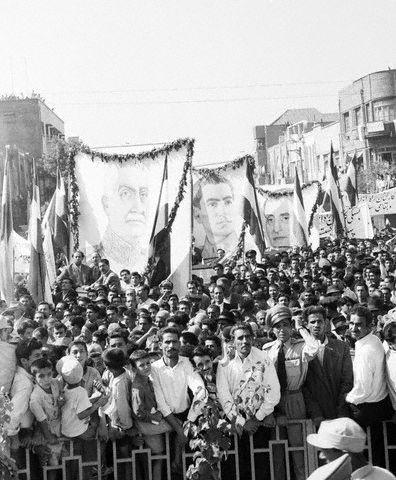
Pro-Shah demonstration, 1954

The very fact that Mohammad Reza was considered a coward and insubstantial turned out to be an advantage as the Shah proved to be an adroit politician, playing off the factions in the elite and the Americans against the British with the aim of being an autocrat in practice as well as in theory. Supporters of the banned National Front were persecuted, but in his first important decision as leader, Mohammad Reza intervened to ensure most of the members of the National Front brought to trial, such as Mosaddegh himself, were not executed as many had expected. Many in the Iranian elite were openly disappointed that Mohammad Reza did not conduct the expected bloody purge and hang Mosaddegh and his followers as they had wanted and expected. In 1954, when twelve university professors issued a public statement criticising the 1953 coup, all were dismissed from their jobs, but in the first of his many acts of "magnanimity" towards the National Front, Mohammad Reza intervened to have them reinstated. Mohammad Reza tried very hard to co-opt the supporters of the National Front by adopting some of their rhetoric and addressing their concerns, for example declaring in several speeches his concerns about the Third World economic conditions and poverty which prevailed in Iran, a matter that had not much interested him before.

Mohammad Reza was determined to copy Mosaddegh, who had won popularity by promising broad socio-economic reforms, and wanted to create a mass powerbase as he did not wish to depend upon the traditional elites, who only wanted him as a legitimising figurehead. In 1955, Mohammad Reza dismissed General Zahedi from his position as prime minister and appointed his

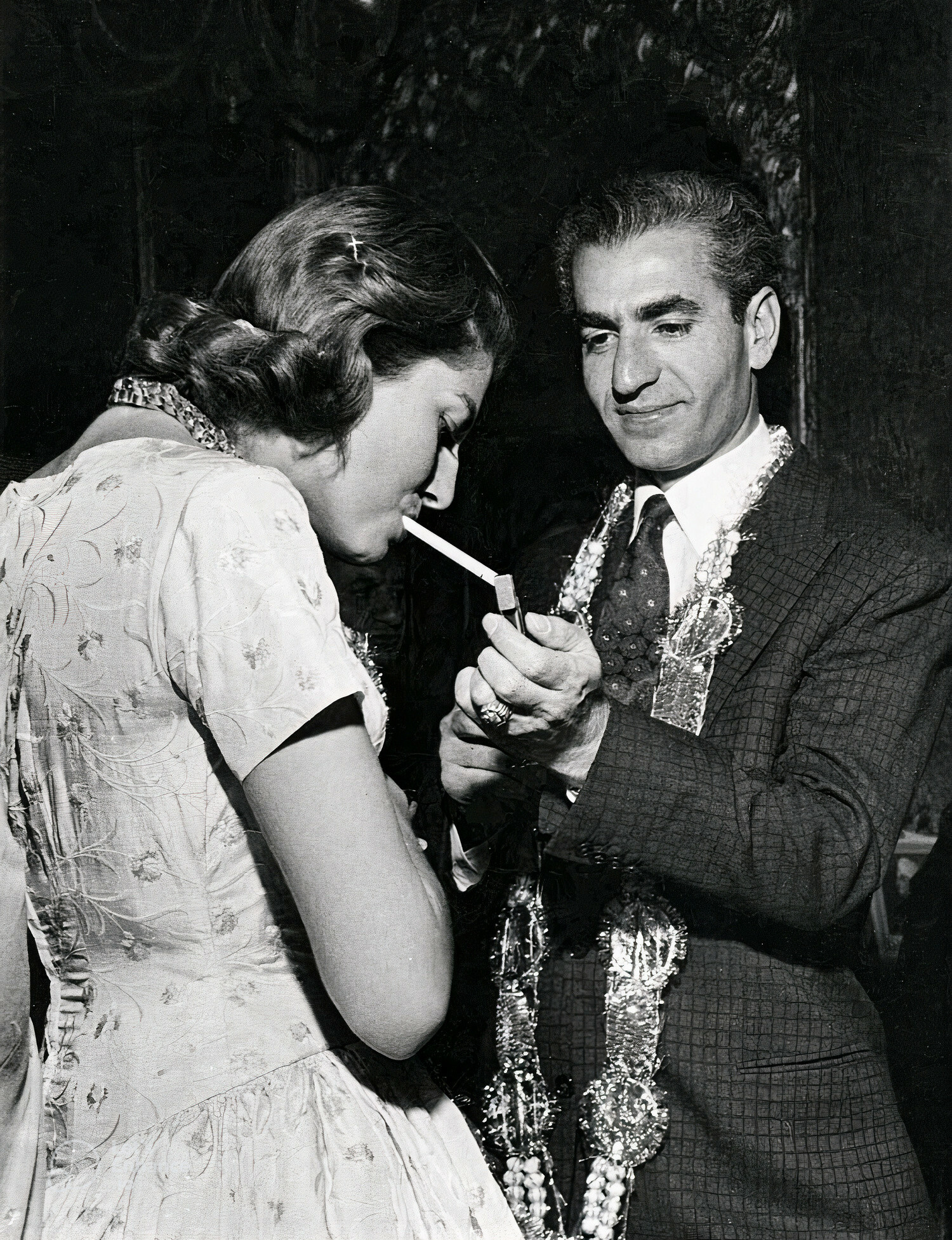
The Shah lighting a cigarette for his wife Soraya, 1950s

archenemy, the technocrat Hossein Ala' as prime minister, whom he in turn dismissed in 1957. Starting in 1955, Mohammad Reza began to quietly cultivate left-wing intellectuals, many of whom had supported the National Front and some of whom were associated with the banned Tudeh party, asking them for advice about how best to reform Iran. It was during this period that Mohammad Reza began to embrace the image of a "progressive" Shah, a reformer who would modernise Iran, who attacked in his speeches the "reactionary" and "feudal" social system that was retarding progress, bring about land reform and give women equal rights.

Determined to rule as well as reign, it was during the mid 1950s that Mohammad Reza started to promote a state cult around Cyrus the Great, portrayed as a great Shah who had reformed the country and built an empire with obvious parallels to himself. Alongside this change in image, Mohammad Reza started to speak of his desire to "save" Iran, a duty that he claimed he had been given by God, and promised that under his leadership Iran would reach a Western standard of living in the near future. During this period, Mohammad Reza sought the support of the ulema, and resumed the traditional policy of persecuting those Iranians who belonged to the Baháʼí Faith, allowing the chief Baháʼí temple in Tehran to be razed in 1955 and bringing in a law banning the Baháʼí from gathering together in groups. A British diplomat reported in 1954 that Reza Khan "must have been spinning in his grave at Rey. To see the arrogance and effrontery of the mullahs once again rampant in the holy city! How the old tyrant must despise the weakness of his son, who allowed these turbulent priests to regain so much of their reactionary influence!" By this time, the Shah's marriage was under strain as Queen Soraya complained about the power of Mohammad Reza's best friend Ernest Perron, whom she called a "shetun" and a "limping devil". Perron was a man much resented for his influence on Mohammad Reza and was often described by enemies as a "diabolical" and "mysterious" character, whose position was that of a private secretary, but who was one of the Shah's closest advisors, holding far more power than his job title suggested.

In a 1957 study compiled by the U.S. State Department, Mohammad Reza was praised for his "growing maturity" and no longer needing "to seek advice at every turn" as the previous 1951 study had concluded. On 27 February 1958, a military coup to depose the Shah led by General Valiollah Gharani was thwarted, which led to a major crisis in Iranian-American relations when evidence emerged that associates of Gharani had met American diplomats in Athens, which the Shah used to demand that henceforward no American officials could meet with his opponents. Another issue in Iranian-American relations was Mohammad Reza's suspicion that the United States was insufficiently committed to Iran's defence, observing that the Americans refused to join the Baghdad Pact, and military studies had indicated that Iran could only hold out for a few days in the event of a Soviet invasion.

In January 1959, the Shah began negotiations on a non-aggression pact with the Soviet Union, which he claimed to have been driven to by a lack of American support. After receiving a mildly threatening letter from President Eisenhower warning him against signing the treaty, Mohammad Reza chose not to sign, which led to a major Soviet propaganda effort calling for his overthrow. Soviet leader Nikita Khrushchev ordered Mohammad Reza assassinated. A sign of Mohammad Reza's power came in 1959 when a British company won a contract with the Iranian government that was suddenly cancelled and given to Siemens instead. An investigation by the British embassy soon uncovered the reason why: Mohammad Reza wanted to bed the wife of the Siemens sales agent for Iran, and the Siemens agent had consented to allowing his wife to sleep with the Shah in exchange for winning back the contract that he had just lost. On 24 July 1959, Mohammad Reza gave Israel implicit recognition by allowing an Israeli trade office to be opened in Tehran that functioned as a de facto embassy, a move that offended many in the Islamic world. When Eisenhower visited Iran on 14 December 1959, Mohammad Reza told him that Iran faced two main external threats: the Soviet Union to the north and the new pro-Soviet revolutionary government in Iraq to the west. This led him to ask for vastly increased American military aid, saying his country was a front-line state in the Cold War that needed as much military power as possible.

The Shah and Soraya's marriage ended in 1958 when it became apparent that, even with help from medical doctors, she could not bear children. Soraya later told The New York Times that the Shah had no choice but to divorce her, and that he was heavy-hearted about the decision. However, even after the marriage, it is reported that the Shah still had great love for Soraya, and it is reported that they met several times after their divorce and that she lived her post-divorce life comfortably (even though she never remarried), being paid a monthly salary of about $7,000 from Iran. Following her death in 2001 at the age of 69 in Paris, an auction of the possessions included a three-million-dollar Paris estate, a 22.37-carat diamond ring, and a 1958 Rolls-Royce.

Pahlavi subsequently indicated his interest in marrying Princess Maria Gabriella of Savoy, a daughter of the deposed Italian king, Umberto II. Pope John XXIII reportedly vetoed the suggestion. In an editorial about the rumours surrounding the marriage of a "Muslim sovereign and a Catholic princess", the Vatican newspaper, L'Osservatore Romano, considered the match "a grave danger", especially considering that under the 1917 Code of Canon Law a Roman Catholic who married a divorced person would be automatically, and could be formally, excommunicated.

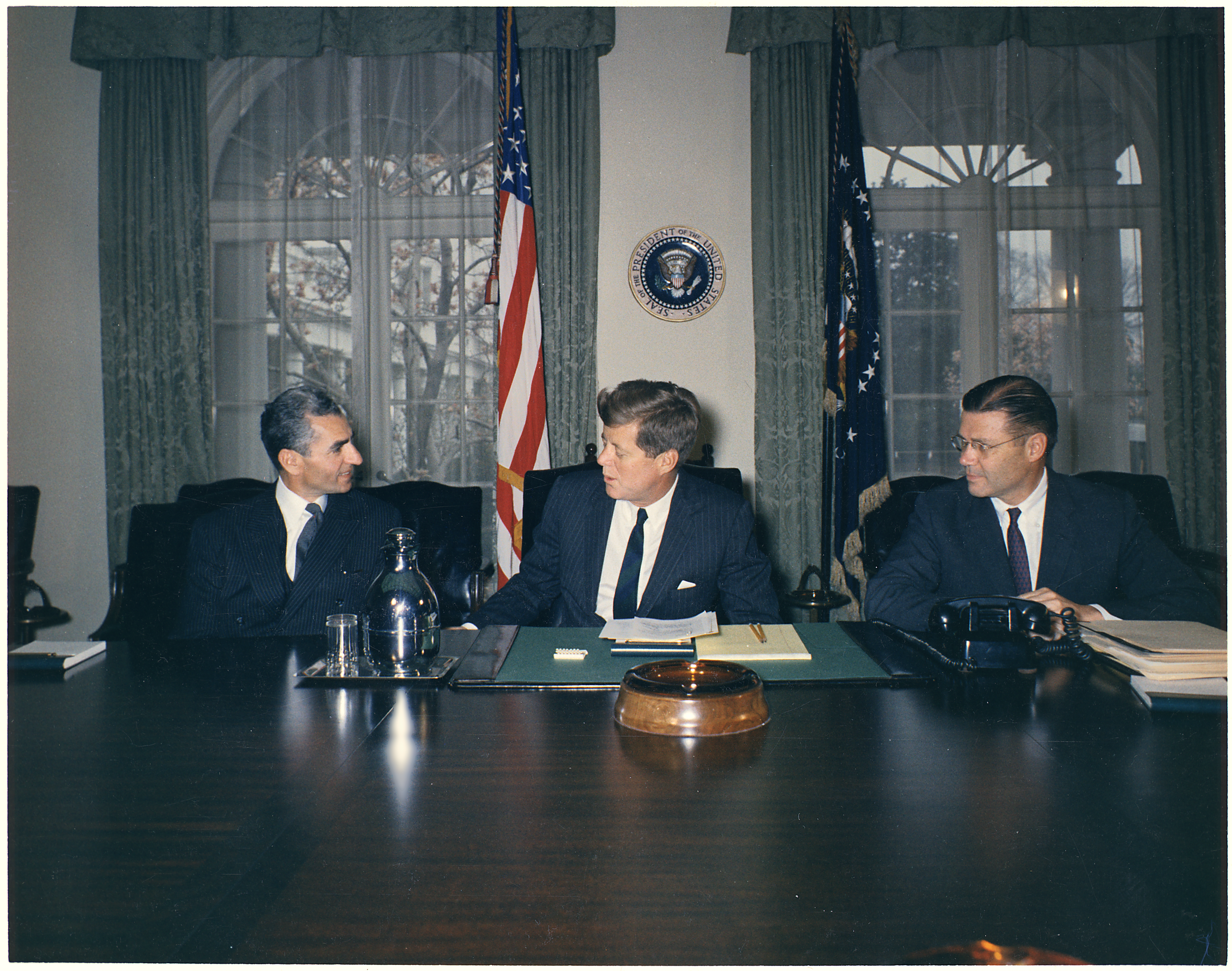
The Shah meeting with U.S. President John F. Kennedy and Secretary of Defense Robert McNamara in April 1962

In the 1960 U.S. presidential election, the Shah had favoured the Republican candidate, incumbent Vice President Richard Nixon, whom he had first met in 1953 and rather liked, and according to the diary of his best friend Asadollah Alam, Mohammad Reza contributed money to the 1960 Nixon campaign. Relations with the victor of the 1960 election, the Democrat John F. Kennedy, were not friendly. In an attempt to mend relations after Nixon's defeat, Mohammad Reza sent General Teymur Bakhtiar of SAVAK to meet Kennedy in Washington on 1 March 1961. From Kermit Roosevelt Jr., Mohammad Reza learned that Bakhtiar, during his trip to Washington, had asked the Americans to support a coup he was planning, which greatly increased the Shah's fears about Kennedy. On 2 May 1961, a teacher's strike involving 50,000 people began in Iran, which Mohammad Reza believed was the work of the CIA. Mohammad Reza had to sack his prime minister Jafar Sharif-Emami and give in to the teachers after learning that the Army probably would not fire on the demonstrators. In 1961, Bakhtiar was dismissed as chief of SAVAK and expelled from Iran in 1962 following a clash between demonstrating university students and the army on 21 January 1962 that left three dead. In April 1962, when Mohammad Reza visited Washington, he was met with demonstrations by Iranian students at American universities, which he believed were organised by U.S. Attorney General Robert F. Kennedy, the President's brother and the leading anti-Pahlavi voice in the Kennedy administration. Afterwards, Mohammad Reza visited London. In a sign of the changed dynamics in Anglo-Iranian relations, the Shah took offence when he was informed he could join Queen Elizabeth II for a dinner at Buckingham Palace that was given in somebody else's honour, insisting successfully he would have dinner with the Queen only when given in his own honour.

Mohammad Reza's first major clash with Ayatollah Khomeini occurred in 1962, when the Shah changed the local laws to allow Iranian Jews, Christians, Zoroastrians, and Baháʼí to take the oath of office for municipal councils using their holy books instead of the Koran. Khomeini wrote to the Shah to say this was unacceptable and that only the Koran could be used to swear in members of the municipal councils regardless of what their religion was, writing that he heard "Islam is not indicated as a precondition for standing for office and women are being granted the right to vote .... Please order all laws inimical to the sacred and official faith of the country to be eliminated from government policies." The Shah wrote back, addressing Khomeini as Hojat-al Islam rather than as Ayatollah, declining his request. Feeling pressure from demonstrations organised by the clergy, the Shah withdrew the offending law, but it was reinstated with the White Revolution of 1963.

== Middle years ==
=== The White Revolution ===
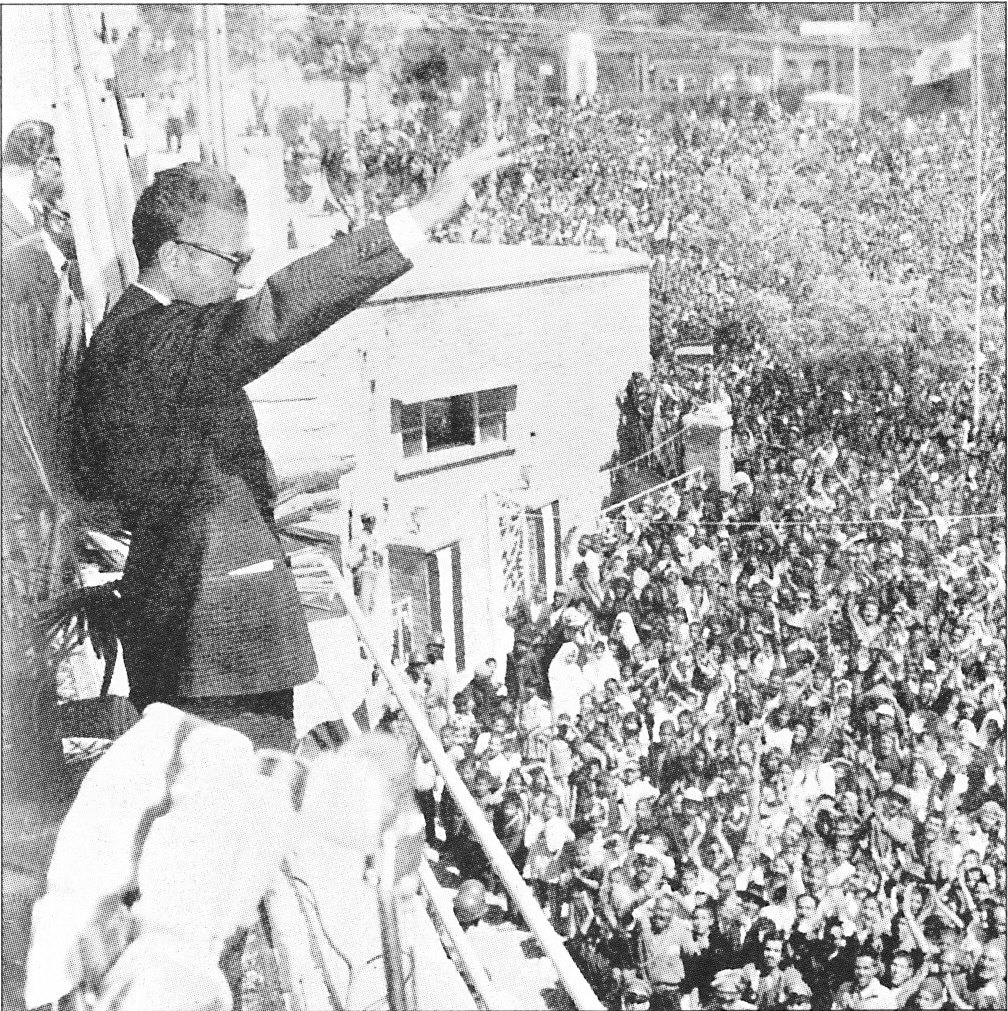
The Shah speaks about the principles of his White Revolution, 1963

==== Conflict with Islamists ====
In 1963, Mohammad Reza launched the White Revolution, a series of far-reaching reforms, which caused much opposition from the religious scholars. They were enraged that the referendum approving the White Revolution in 1963 that allowed women to vote, with the Ayatollah Khomeini saying in his sermons that the fate of Iran should never be allowed to be decided by women. In 1963 and 1964, nationwide demonstrations against Mohammad Reza's rule took place all over Iran, with the centre of the unrest being the holy city of Qom. Students studying to be imams at Qom were most active in the protests, and Ayatollah Khomeini emerged as one of the leaders, giving sermons calling for the Shah's overthrow. At least 200 people were killed, with the police throwing some students to their deaths from high buildings, and Khomeini was exiled to Iraq in 4 October 1965.

The second attempt on the Shah's life occurred on 10 April 1965. A soldier named Reza Shamsabadi shot his way through the Marble Palace. The assassin was killed before he reached the royal quarters, but two civilian guards died protecting the Shah.

==== Conflict with communists and socialists ====
According to Vladimir Kuzichkin, a former KGB officer who defected to MI-6, the Soviet Union also targeted the Shah. The Soviets tried to use a TV remote control to detonate a bomb-laden Volkswagen Beetle; the TV remote failed to function. A high-ranking Romanian defector, Ion Mihai Pacepa, also supported this claim, asserting that he had been the target of various assassination attempts by Soviet agents for many years.

=== Pahlavi's court ===
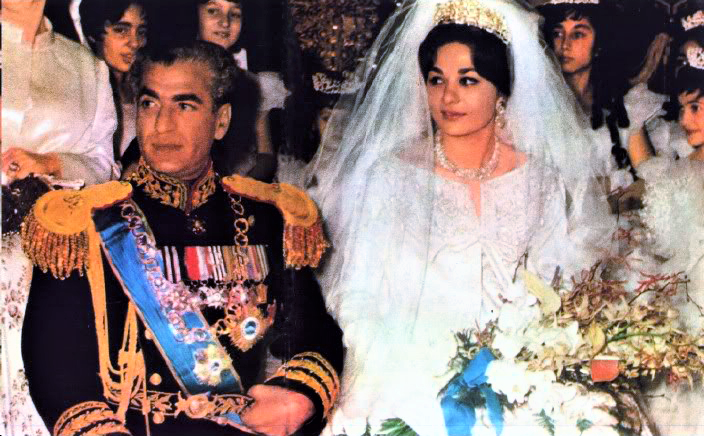
Wedding of the Shah with Farah Diba on 20 December 1959

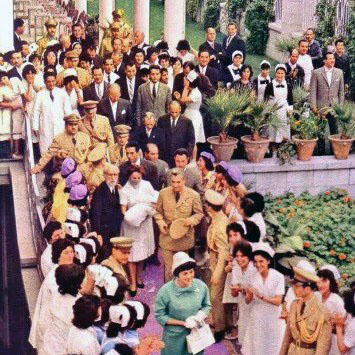
The Shah and his wife, Farah, after the birth of their son, Reza, in a public hospital in Tehran, 1960

Mohammad Reza's third and final wife was Farah Diba (born 14 October 1938), the only child of Sohrab Diba, a captain in the Imperial Iranian Army (son of an Iranian ambassador to the Romanov Court in St. Petersburg, Russia), and his wife, the former Farideh Ghotbi. They were married in 1959, and Queen Farah was crowned Shahbanu, or Empress, a title created specifically for her in 1967. Previous royal consorts had been known as "Malakeh" (Arabic: Malika), or Queen. The couple remained together for 21 years, until the Shah's death. They had four children together:

- Crown Prince Reza Pahlavi (born 31 October 1960), heir to the now defunct Iranian throne. Reza Pahlavi is the founder and leader of National Council of Iran, a government in exile of Iran;
- Princess Farahnaz Pahlavi (born 12 March 1963);
- Prince Ali Reza Pahlavi (28 April 1966 – 4 January 2011);
- Princess Leila Pahlavi (27 March 1970 – 10 June 2001).

One of Mohammad Reza's favourite activities was watching films, and his favourites were light French comedies and Hollywood action films, much to the disappointment of Farah, who tried hard to interest him in more serious films. Mohammad Reza was said to have been unfaithful towards Farah, and his right-hand man Asadollah Alam regularly imported tall European women for "outings" with the Shah, though Alam's diary also mentions that if women from the "blue-eyed world" were not available, he would bring the Shah "local product". When Farah learned about his affairs in 1973, Alam blamed the prime minister Amir Abbas Hoveyda, while the Shah thought it was the KGB. Milani noted that neither admitted it was the Shah's "crass infidelities" that caused this issue. Milani further wrote that "Alam, in his most destructive moments of sycophancy, reassured the Shah—or his 'master' as he calls him—that the country was prosperous and no one begrudged the King a bit of fun". He also had a passion for automobiles and aeroplanes, and by the mid-1970s, the Shah had amassed one of the world's largest collections of luxury cars and planes. His visits to the West were invariably the occasions for major protests by the Confederation of Iranian Students, an umbrella group of far-left Iranian university students studying abroad, and Mohammad Reza had one of the world's largest security details as he lived in constant fear of assassination.

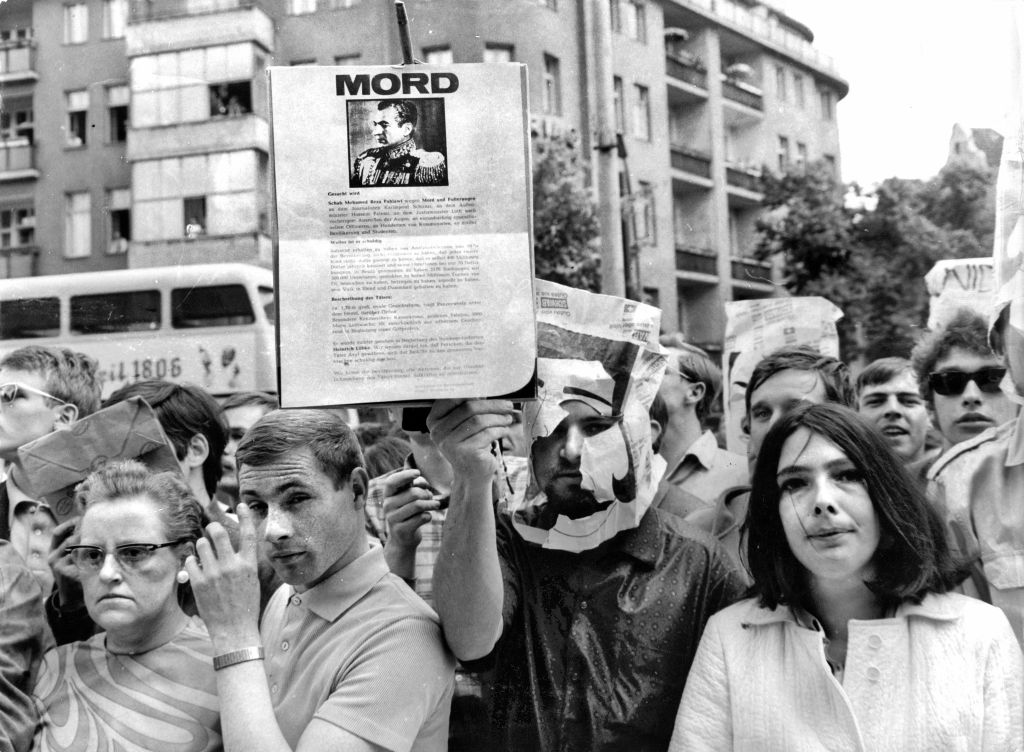
An anti-Shah demonstration in West Berlin, 1968

Milani described Mohammad Reza's court as open and tolerant, noting that his and Farah's two favourite interior designers, Keyvan Khosrovani and Bijan Saffari, were openly gay, and were not penalised for their sexual orientation, with Khosrovani often advising the Shah about how to dress. Milani noted the close connection between architecture and power, as architecture is the "poetry of power" in Iran. In this sense, the Niavaran Palace, with its mixture of modernist style, heavily influenced by current French and traditional Persian styles, reflected Mohammad Reza's personality. Mohammad Reza was a Francophile whose court had a decidedly French ambiance.

Mohammad Reza commissioned a documentary from the French filmmaker Albert Lamorisse meant to glorify Iran under his rule. But he was annoyed that the film focused only on Iran's past, writing to Lamorisse there were no modern buildings in his film, which he charged made Iran look "backward". Mohammad Reza's office was functional, with ceilings and walls decorated with Qajar art. Farah began collecting modern art and by the early 1970s owned works by Picasso, Gauguin, Chagall, and Braque, which added to the modernist feel of the Niavaran Palace.

=== Imperial coronation ===
On 26 October 1967, 26 years into his reign as Shah ("King"), he took the ancient title Shāhanshāh ("Emperor" or "King of Kings") in a lavish coronation ceremony held in Tehran. He said that he chose to wait until this moment to assume the title because, in his own opinion, he "did not deserve it" up until then; he is also recorded as saying that there was "no honour in being Emperor of a poor country", which he viewed Iran as being until that time.

=== 2,500-year celebration of the Persian Empire ===
As part of his efforts to modernise Iran and give the Iranian people a non-Islamic identity, Mohammad Reza quite consciously started to celebrate Iranian history before the Arab conquest with a special focus on the Achaemenid period. In October 1971, he marked the anniversary of 2,500 years of continuous Persian monarchy since the founding of the Achaemenid Empire by Cyrus the Great. Concurrent with this celebration, Mohammad Reza changed the benchmark of the Iranian calendar from the Hijrah to the beginning of the First Persian Empire, measured from Cyrus the Great's coronation.

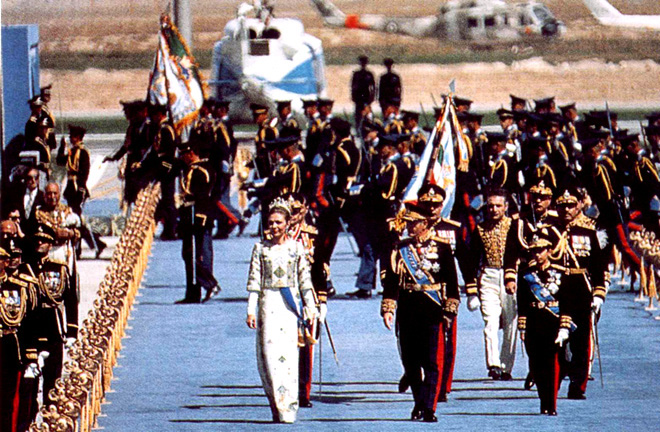
The arrival of Shah Mohammad Reza, Shahbanu Farah and Crown Prince Reza in Pasargadae, in front of Cyrus' tomb, 12 October 1971

At the celebration at Persepolis in 1971, the Shah had an elaborate fireworks show intended to send a dual message; that Iran was still faithful to its ancient traditions and that Iran had transcended its past to become a modern nation, that Iran was not "stuck in the past", but as a nation that embraced modernity had chosen to be faithful to its past. The message was further reinforced the next day when the "Parade of Persian History" was performed at Persepolis when 6,000 soldiers dressed in the uniforms of every dynasty from the Achaemenids to the Pahlavis marched past Mohammad Reza in a grand parade that many contemporaries remarked "surpassed in sheer spectacle the most florid celluloid imaginations of Hollywood epics". To complete the message, Mohammad Reza finished off the celebrations by opening a brand new museum in Tehran, the Shahyad Aryamehr, that was housed in a very modernistic building and attended another parade in the newly opened Aryamehr Stadium, intended to give a message of "compressed time" between antiquity and modernity. A brochure put up by the Celebration Committee explicitly stated the message: "Only when change is extremely rapid, and the past ten years have proved to be so, does the past attain new and unsuspected values worth cultivating", going on to say the celebrations were held because "Iran has begun to feel confident of its modernization". Milani noted it was a sign of the liberalization of the middle years of Mohammad Reza's reign that Hussein Amanat, the architect who designed the Shahyad was a young Baháʼí from a middle-class family who did not belong to the "thousand families" that traditionally dominated Iran, writing that only in this moment in Iranian history such a thing was possible.

=== Role at OPEC ===
Prior to the 1973 oil embargo, Iran spearheaded OPEC's aim for higher oil prices. When raising oil prices, Iran would point out the rising inflation as a means to justify the price increases. In the aftermath of the Yom Kippur War, Arab states employed an oil embargo in 1973 against Western nations. Although the Shah declared neutrality, he sought to exploit the lack of crude oil supply to Iran's benefit. The Shah held a meeting of Persian Gulf oil producers, declaring they should double the price of oil for the second time in a year. The price hike resulted in an "oil shock" that crippled Western economies while Iran saw a rapid growth of oil revenues. Iranian oil incomes doubled to $4.6 billion in 1973–1974 and spiked to $17.8 billion in the following year. As a result, the Shah had established himself as the dominant figure of OPEC, having control over oil prices and production. Iran experienced an economic growth rate of 33% in 1973 and 40% the next year, and GNI expanded 50% in the next year.

The Shah's oil coup signaled that the United States had lost the ability to influence Iranian foreign and economic policy. Under the Shah, Iran dominated OPEC and Middle Eastern oil exports.

=== Nationalist Iran ===
By the 19th century, the Persian word Vatan began to refer to a national homeland for many intellectuals in Iran. The education system was controlled mainly by Shiite clergy who utilized a Maktab system in which open political discussion of modernization was prevented. However, a number of scholarly intellectuals, including Mirzā FathʿAli Ākhundzādeh, Mirzā Āqā Khān Kermāni, and Mirzā Malkam Khān began to criticize Islam's role in public life while promoting a secular identity for Iran. Over time, studies of Iran's glorious history and present reality of a declined Qajar period led many to question what led to Iran's decline. Iranian history was categorized into pre-Islamic and Islamic periods. Iran's pre-Islamic period was seen as prosperous, while the Arab invasions were seen as "a political catastrophe that pummelled the superior Iranian civilization under its hoof". Therefore, as a result of the growing number of Iranian intellectuals in the 1800s, the Ancient Persian Empire symbolized modernity and originality, while the Islamic period brought by Arab invasions imposed on Iran a period of backwardness.

Ultimately, these revelations in Iran would lead to the rise of Aryan nationalism in Iran and the perception of an "intellectual awakening", as described by Homa Katouzian. In Europe, many concepts of Aryan nationalism were directed at the anti-Jewish sentiment. In contrast, Iran's Aryan nationalism was deeply rooted in Persian history and became synonymous with an anti-Arab sentiment instead. Furthermore, the Achaemenid and Sasanian periods were perceived as the real Persia, a Persia which commanded the respect of the world and was void of foreign culture before the Arab invasions.

Thus, under the Pahlavi state, these ideas of Aryan and pre-Islamic Iranian nationalism continued with the rise of Reza Shah. Under the last Shah, the tomb of Cyrus the Great was established as a significant site for all Iranians. The Mission for My Country, written by the Shah, described Cyrus as "one of the most dynamic men in history" and stated that "wherever Cyrus conquered, he would pardon the very people who had fought him, treat them well, and keep them in their former posts .... While Iran at the time knew nothing of democratic political institutions, Cyrus nevertheless demonstrated some of the qualities which provide the strength of the great modern democracies". The Cyrus Cylinder also became an important cultural symbol and Pahlavi successfully popularized the decree as an ancient declaration of human rights. The Shah employed titles like Āryāmehr and Shāhanshāh in order to emphasize Iranian supremacy and the kings of Iran.

The Shah continued with his father's ideas of Iranian nationalism, treating Arabs as the utmost other. Nationalist narratives, which were widely accepted by a majority of Iranians, portrayed Arabs as hostile to Pahlavi's revival of "modern" and "authentic" Iran.

=== Economic growth ===
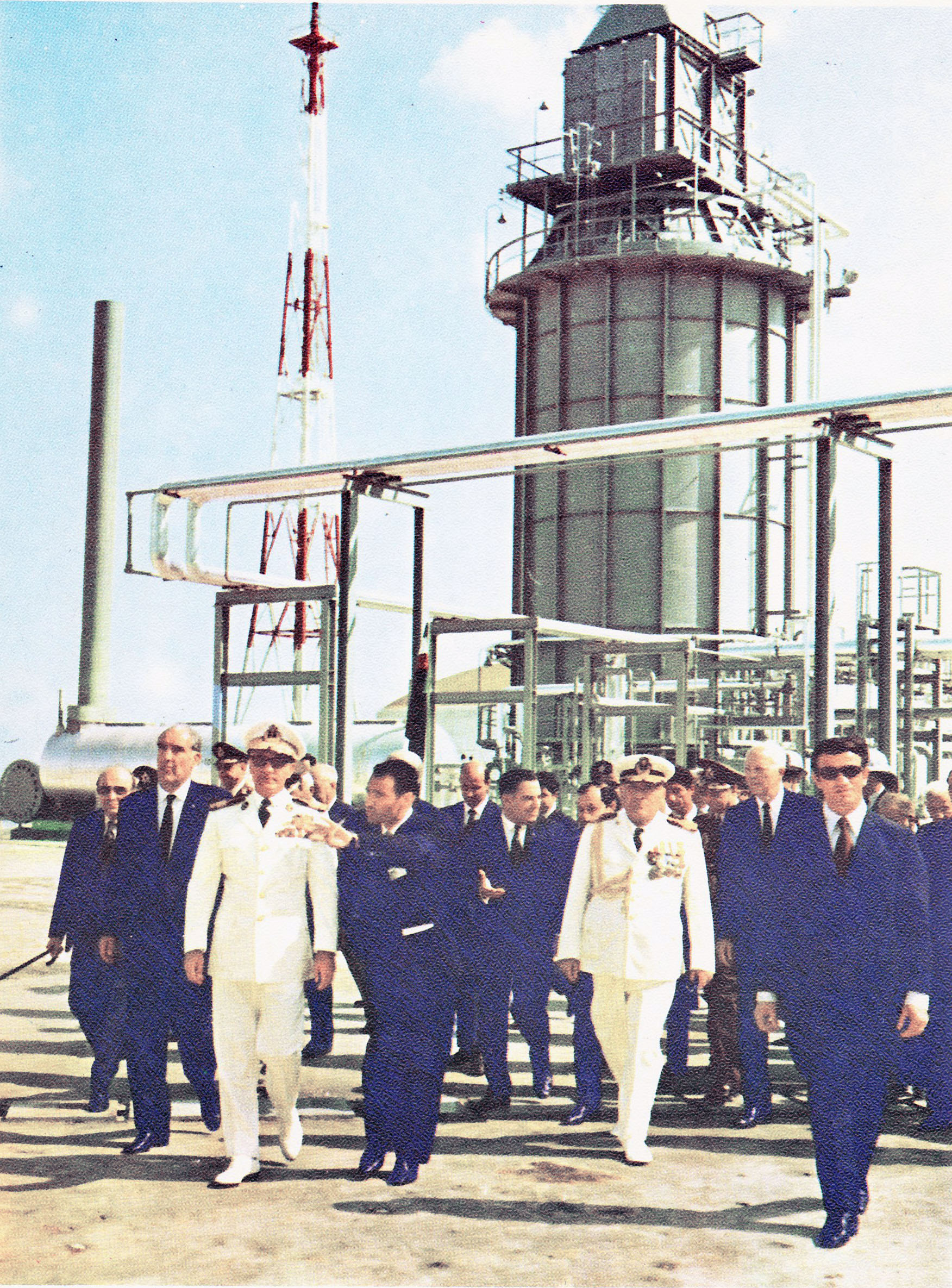
The Shah visiting the Kharg Petrochemical Complex, 1970

In the 1970s, Iran had an economic growth rate equal to that of South Korea, Turkey, and Taiwan; Western journalists regularly predicted that Iran would become a First World nation within the next generation. Significantly, a "reverse brain drain" had begun with Iranians who had been educated in the West returning home to take up positions in government and business. The firm of Iran National, run by the Khayami brothers, had become by 1978 the largest automobile manufacturer in the Middle East, producing 136,000 cars every year while employing 12,000 people in Mashhad. Mohammad Reza had strong étatist tendencies and was deeply involved in the economy, with his economic policies bearing a strong resemblance to the same étatist policies being pursued simultaneously by General Park Chung-hee in South Korea. Mohammad Reza considered himself a socialist, saying he was "more socialist and revolutionary than anyone". Reflecting his self-proclaimed socialist tendencies, although unions were illegal, the Shah brought in labour laws that were "surprisingly fair to workers".

Iran in the 1960s and 70s was a tolerant place for the Jewish minority. One Iranian Jew, David Menasheri later said that Mohammad Reza's reign was the "golden age" for Iranian Jews when they were equals, and when the Iranian Jewish community was one of the wealthiest Jewish communities in the world. The Baháʼí minority also did well after the bout of persecution in the mid-1950s ended, with several Baháʼí families rising to prominence in the world of Iranian business.

Under his reign, Iran experienced over a decade of double-digit GDP growth coupled with major investments in military and infrastructure. Elementary school education was made free and mandatory; in 1974, $16 billion was spent on building new schools and hospitals. The same year, Iran agreed to purchase more arms from the United States than did the rest of the world combined in any other preceding year.

The Shah's first economic plan was geared towards large infrastructure projects and improving the agricultural sector, which led to the development of many major dams, particularly in Karaj, Safīdrūd, and Dez. The next economic plan was directed and characterized by an expansion in the credit and monetary policy of the nation, which resulted in a rapid expansion of Iran's private sector, particularly in construction. From the period 1955–1959, real gross fixed capital formation in the private sector saw an average annual increase of 39.3%. The private sector credit rose by 46 percent in 1957, 61 percent in 1958, and 32 percent in 1959 (Central Bank of Iran, Annual Report, 1960 and 1961). By 1963, the Shah had begun a redistribution of land offering compensation to landlords valued on previous tax assessments, and the land obtained by the government was then sold on favourable terms to Iranian peasants. The Shah also initiated the nationalization of forests and pastures, female suffrage, profit-sharing for industrial workers, privatization of state industries, and formation of literacy corps. These developments marked a turning point in Iranian history as the nation prepared to embark on a rapid and aggressive industrialization process.

The years 1963–1978 represented the longest period of sustained growth in per capita real income that the Iranian economy ever experienced. During the 1963–77 period, gross domestic product (GDP) grew by an average annual rate of 10.5% with an annual population growth rate of around 2.7% placing Iran as one of the fastest growing economies in the world. Iran's GDP per capita was $170 in 1963, rising to $2,060 by 1977. The growth was not just a result of increased oil revenues. In fact, the non-oil GDPs grew by an average annual rate of 11.5 percent, which was higher than the average annual rate of growth experienced in oil revenues. By the fifth economic planning, oil GDP rose to 15.3% strongly outpacing growth rates in oil revenue, which only saw 0.5% growth. From 1963 to 1977, the industrial and the service sectors experienced annual growth rates of 15.0% and 14.3%, respectively. The manufacturing of cars, television sets, refrigerators, and other household goods increased substantially in Iran. For instance, from 1969 to 1977, the number of private cars produced in Iran increased steadily from 29,000 to 132,000, and the number of television sets produced rose from 73,000 in 1969 to 352,000 in 1975.

The growth of industrial sectors in Iran led to substantial urbanization of the country. The extent of urbanization rose from 31 percent in 1956 to 49 percent in 1978. By the mid-1970s, Iran's national debt was paid off, turning the nation from a debtor to a creditor nation. The balances on the nation's account for the 1959–78 period resulted in a surplus of approximately $15.17 billion. The Shah's fifth five-year economic plan sought to achieve a reduction in foreign imports through the use of higher tariffs on consumer goods, preferential bank loans to the industrialists, maintenance of an overvalued rial, and food subsidies in urban areas. These developments led to a new large industrialist class in Iran, and the nation's industrial structure was extremely insulated from threats of foreign competition.

In 1976, Iran saw its largest-ever GDP uptick, largely thanks to the Shah's economic policies. According to the World Bank, when valued in 2010 dollars, Mohammad Reza Pahlavi improved the country's per-capita GDP to $10,261, the highest at any point in Iran's history.

According to economist Fereydoun Khavand:

During these 15 years, the average annual growth rate of the country fluctuated above 10%. The total volume of Iran's economy increased nearly fivefold during this period. In contrast, during the past 40 years, Iran's average annual economic growth rate has been only about two percent. Considering the growth rate of Iran's population in the post-revolution period, the average per capita growth rate of Iran in the last 40 years is estimated between zero percent and half a percent. Among the main factors hindering the growth rate in Iran are a lack of a favorable business environment, severe investment weakness, very low levels of productivity, and constant tension in the country's regional and global relations.

Many European, American, and Japanese investment firms sought business ventures and to open up headquarters in Iran. According to one American investment banker, "They are now dependent on Western technology, but what happens when they produce and export steel and copper, when they reduce their agricultural problems? They'll eat everybody else in the Middle East alive."

=== Relationship with the Western world ===
By the 1960s and 1970s, Iranian oil revenues experienced rapid growth. By the mid-1960s, Iran saw "weakened U.S. influence in Iranian politics" and a strengthening in the power of the Iranian state. According to Homa Katouzian, the perception that the US was the instructor of the Shah's regime due to their support for the 1953 coup contradicted the reality that "its real influence" in domestic Iranian politics and policy "declined considerably". In 1973 the Shah initiated an oil price hike with his control of OPEC further demonstrating the US no longer had influence over Iranian foreign and economic policies. In response to American media outlets critical of him, the Shah claimed that Iran's oil price hikes did little to contribute to the rising inflation in the United States. Pahlavi also implied criticism of the US for not taking the lead on anti-communist efforts.

In 1974, during the oil crisis, the Shah began an atomic nuclear energy policy, prompting US Trade Administrator William E. Simon to denounce the Shah as a "nut." In response, US President Nixon publicly apologised to the Shah through a letter in order to disassociate the president and the United States from the statement. Simon's statement illustrated the growing American tensions with Iran over the Shah's raising of oil prices. Nixon's apology covered up the reality that the Shah's ambitions to become the leader in the Persian Gulf Area and the Indian Ocean basin were placing a serious strain on his relationship with the United States, particularly as India had tested its first atomic bomb in May 1974.

Many critics labelled the Shah as a Western and American "puppet", an accusation that has been disproven as unfounded by contemporary scholars due to the Shah's strong regional and nationalist ambitions, which often led Tehran to disputes with its Western allies. In particular, the Carter administration which took control of the White House in 1977 saw the Shah as a troublesome ally and sought change in Iran's political system.

By the 1970s, the Shah had become a strongman. His power had dramatically increased both in Iran and internationally, and on the tenth anniversary of the White Revolution, he challenged The Consortium Agreement of 1954 and terminated the agreement after negotiations with the oil consortium resulting in the establishment of 1973 Sale and Purchase Agreement.

Khomeini accused the Shah of false rumors and employed Soviet methods of deception. The accusations were amplified by international media outlets, which widely propagated the information, and protests were widely shown on Iranian televisions.

Many Iranian students studied across Western Europe and the United States, where ideas of liberalism, democracy, and counterculture flourished. Among left-leaning Westerners, the Shah's reign was seen as equivalent to that of right-wing hate figures. Western anti-Shah fervour broadcast by European and American media outlets was ultimately adopted by Iranian students and intellectuals studying in the West, who accused the Shah of Westoxification when it was the students themselves who were adopting Western liberalism they experienced during their studies. These Western ideas of liberalism resulted in utopian visions for revolution and social change. In turn, the Shah criticized Western democracies and equated them to chaos.

Furthermore, the Shah chastised Americans and Europeans as being "lazy" and "lacking discipline" and criticized their student radicalism as being caused by Western decline. President Nixon expressed his concern to the Shah that Iranian students in the United States would similarly become radicalized, asking the Shah: "Are your students infected?" and "Can you do anything?"

=== Foreign relations and policies ===
==== France ====
In 1961, the Francophile Mohammad Reza visited Paris to meet his favourite leader, General Charles de Gaulle of France. Mohammad Reza saw height as the measure of a man and a woman (the Shah had a marked preference for tall women) and the 6 feet 5 inches (1.96 m) de Gaulle was his most admired leader. Mohammad Reza loved to be compared to his "ego ideal" of General de Gaulle, and his courtiers constantly flattered him by calling him Iran's de Gaulle. During the French trip, Queen Farah, who shared her husband's love of French culture and language, befriended the culture minister André Malraux, who arranged for the exchange of cultural artifacts between French and Iranian museums and art galleries, a policy that remained a key component of Iran's cultural diplomacy until 1979. Many of the legitimising devices of the regime, such as the constant use of referendums, were modelled after de Gaulle's regime. Intense Francophiles, Mohammad Reza and Farah preferred to speak French rather than Persian to their children. Mohammad Reza built the Niavaran Palace, which took up 840 square metres (9,000 sq ft) and whose style was a blend of Persian and French architecture.

==== United States ====
The Shah's diplomatic foundation was the United States' guarantee that it would protect his regime, enabling him to stand up to larger enemies. While the arrangement did not preclude other partnerships and treaties, it helped to provide a somewhat stable environment in which Mohammad Reza could implement his reforms. Another factor guiding Mohammad Reza's foreign policy was his wish for financial stability, which required strong diplomatic ties. A third factor was his wish to present Iran as a prosperous and powerful nation; this fuelled his domestic policy of Westernisation and reform. A final component was his promise that communism could be halted at Iran's border if his monarchy was preserved. By 1977, the country's treasury, the Shah's autocracy, and his strategic alliances seemed to form a protective layer around Iran.

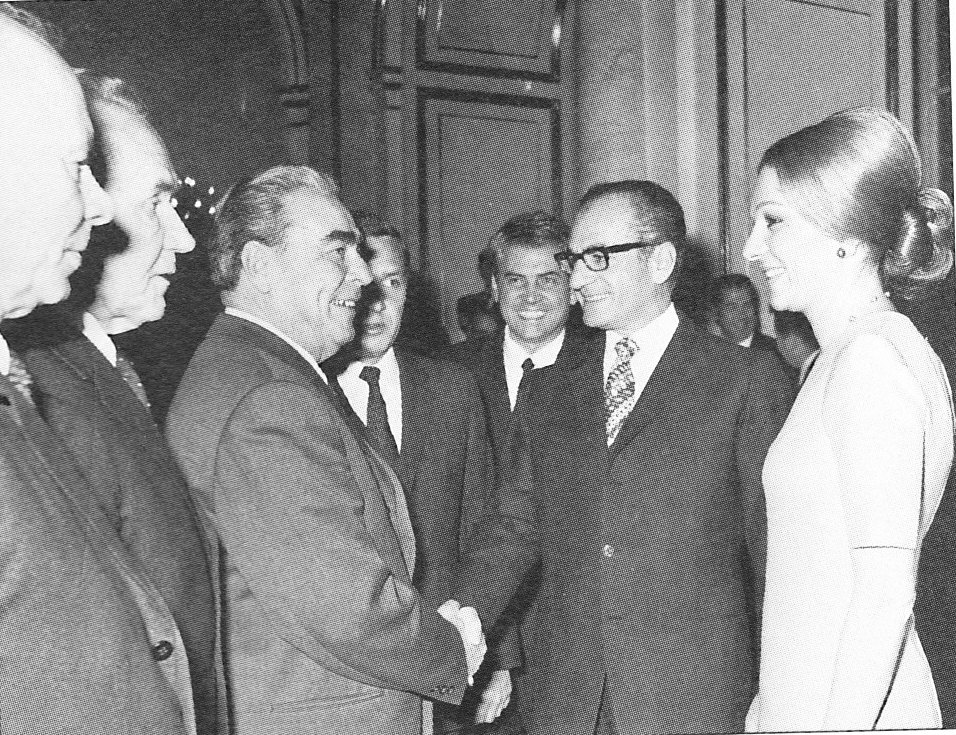
Mohammad Reza Shah and Farah Pahlavi meeting with general secretary Leonid Brezhnev in Moscow, 1970

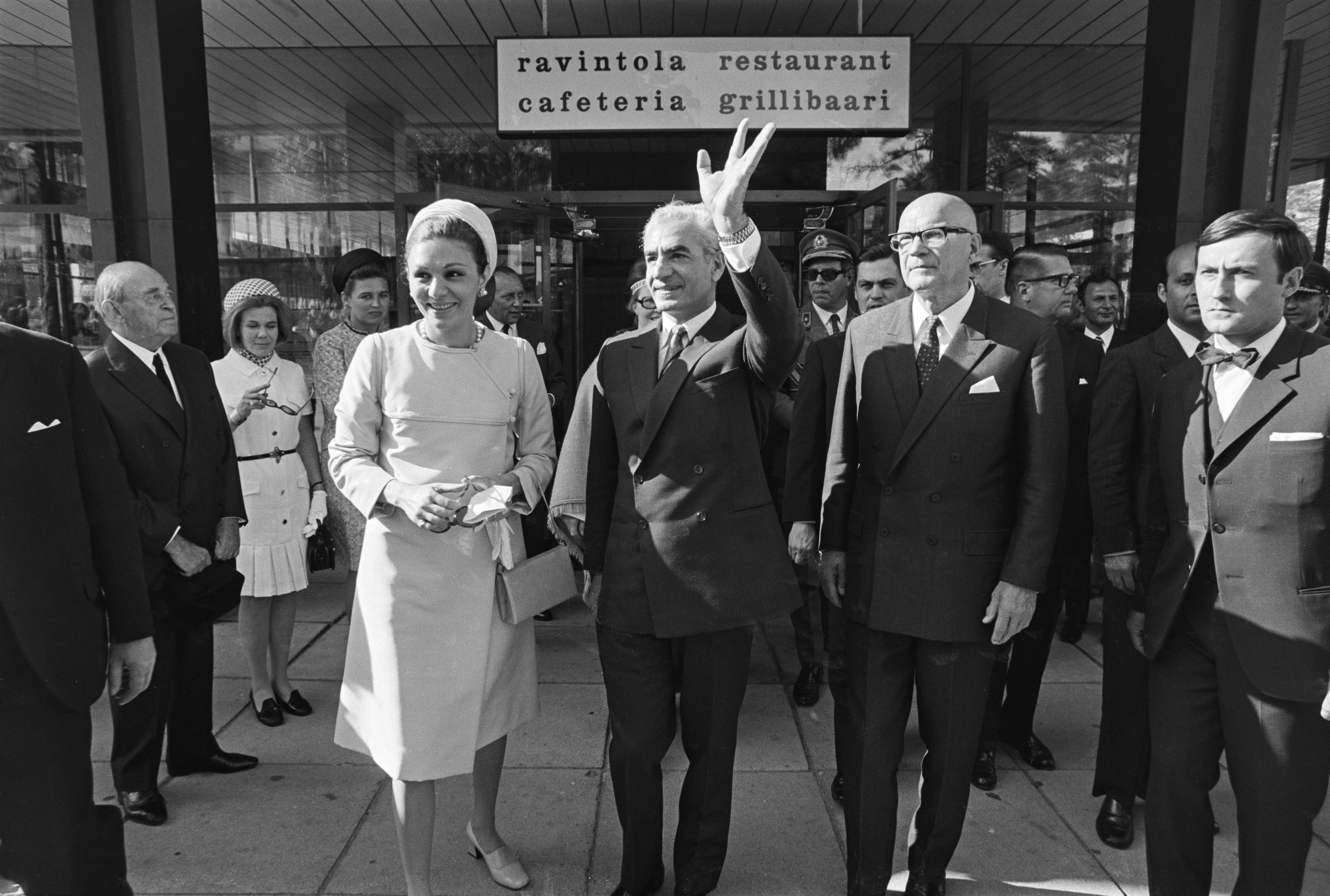
The Shah and his wife visited Espoo, Finland in June 1970. President Urho Kekkonen next to the Shah.

Although the US was responsible for putting the Shah in power, he did not always act as a close American ally. In the early 1960s, when the State Department's Policy Planning Staff that included William R. Polk encouraged the Shah to distribute Iran's growing revenues more equitably, slow the rush toward militarisation, and open the government to political processes, he became furious. He identified Polk as "the principal enemy of his regime." In July 1964, the Shah, Turkish President Cemal Gürsel, and Pakistani President Ayub Khan announced in Istanbul the establishment of the Regional Cooperation for Development (RCD) organisation to promote joint transportation and economic projects. It also envisioned Afghanistan's joining at some time in the future. The Shah was the first regional leader to grant de facto recognition to Israel.

When interviewed on 60 Minutes by reporter Mike Wallace, he criticised American Jews for their presumed control over US media and finance, saying that The New York Times and The Washington Post were so pro-Israel in their coverage that it was a disservice to Israel's own interests. He also said that the Palestinians were "bully[ing] the world" through "terrorism and blackmail". The Shah's remarks on the alleged Jewish lobby are widely believed to have been intended to pacify the Shah's Arab critics. In any case, bilateral relations between Iran and Israel were not adversely affected.

In a 1967 memo to President Lyndon B. Johnson, US defense Secretary Robert McNamara wrote that "our sales [to Iran] have created about 1.4 million man-years of employment in the US and over $1 billion in profits to American industry over the last five years," leading him to conclude that Iran was an arms market the United States could not do without. In June 1965, after the Americans proved reluctant to sell Mohammad Reza some of the weapons he asked for, the Shah visited Moscow, where the Soviets agreed to sell some $110 million-worth of weaponry; the threat of Iran pursuing the "Soviet option" caused the Americans to resume selling Iran weapons. Additionally, British, French, and Italian arms firms were willing to sell Iran weapons, thus giving Mohammad Reza considerable leverage in his talks with the Americans, who sometimes worried that the Shah was buying more weapons than Iran needed or could handle. The Nixon administration had no such concerns, agreeing to sell the Shah, "all available sophisticated weapons short of the atomic bomb," in May of 1972.

Lunar astronaut Neil Armstrong meeting the Shah of Iran during visit of Apollo 11 astronauts to Tehran on 28–31 October 1969

==== Arab countries ====
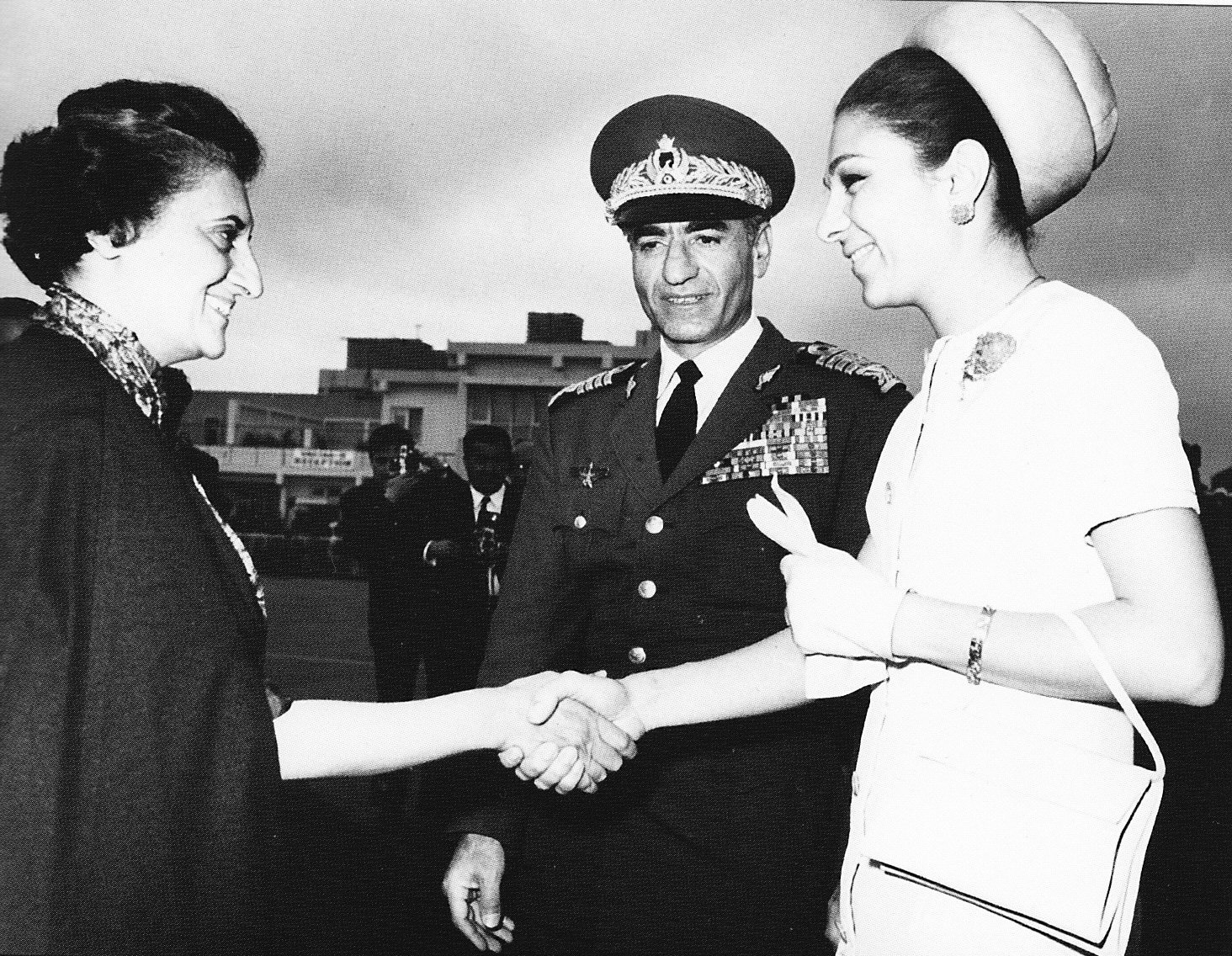
The Shah and his wife Farah meet Indira Gandhi in India, 1970

Concerning the fate of Bahrain (which Britain had controlled since the 19th century, but which Iran claimed as its own territory) and three small Persian Gulf islands, the Shah negotiated an agreement with the British, which, by means of a public consensus, ultimately led to the independence of Bahrain (against the wishes of Iranian nationalists). In return, Iran took full control of Greater and Lesser Tunbs and Abu Musa in the Strait of Hormuz, three strategically sensitive islands which the United Arab Emirates claimed. During this period, the Shah sent one of his most trusted tribal men, Sheikh Abdulkarim Al-Faisali, and maintained cordial relations with the Persian Gulf states and established close diplomatic ties with Saudi Arabia. Mohammad Reza saw Iran as the natural dominant power in the Persian Gulf region, and tolerated no challenges to Iranian hegemony, a claim supported by a gargantuan arms-buying spree that started in the early 1960s. Mohammad Reza supported the Yemeni royalists against republican forces in the Yemen Civil War (1962–70) and assisted the sultan of Oman in putting down a rebellion in Dhofar (1971). In 1971, Mohammad Reza told a journalist: "World events were such that we were compelled to accept the fact that [the] sea adjoining the Oman Sea—I mean the Indian Ocean—does not recognise borders. As for Iran's security limits—I will not state how many kilometres we have in mind, but anyone who is acquainted with geography and the strategic situation, and especially with the potential air and sea forces, know what distances from Chah Bahar this limit can reach".

From 1968 to 1975 the Iraq deported over 60,000 Iraqis of Iranian descent into Iran, causing a rise in tensions. Iran's relations with Iraq, however, were often difficult due to political instability in the latter country. Mohammad Reza was distrustful of both the socialist government of Abd al-Karim Qasim and the Arab nationalist Ba'ath Party. He resented the internationally recognised Iran-Iraq border on the Shatt al-Arab River, which a 1937 treaty fixed on the low watermark on the Iranian side, giving Iraq control of most of the Shatt al-Arab. On 19 April 1969, the Shah abrogated the treaty, and as a result, Iran ceased paying tolls to Iraq when its ships used the Shatt al-Arab, ending Iraq's lucrative source of income. He justified his move by arguing that almost all river borders all over the world ran along the thalweg, and by claiming that because most of the ships that used the Shatt al-Arab were Iranian, the 1937 treaty was unfair to Iran. Iraq threatened war over the Iranian move, but when on 24 April 1969 an Iranian tanker escorted by Iranian warships sailed down the Shatt al-Arab without paying tolls, Iraq, being the militarily weaker state, did nothing. The Iranian abrogation of the 1937 treaty marked the beginning of a period of acute Iraqi–Iranian tension that was to last until the Algiers Accords of 1975. The fact that Iraq had welcomed the former SAVAK chief General Teymur Bakhtiar to Baghdad, where he regularly met with representatives of the Tudeh Party and the Confederation of Iranian Students, added to the difficult relations between Iran and Iraq. On 7 August 1970, Bakhtiar was badly wounded by a SAVAK assassin who shot him five times, and he died five days later; Alam wrote in his diary that Mohammad Reza rejoiced at the news.

==== Soviet Union ====
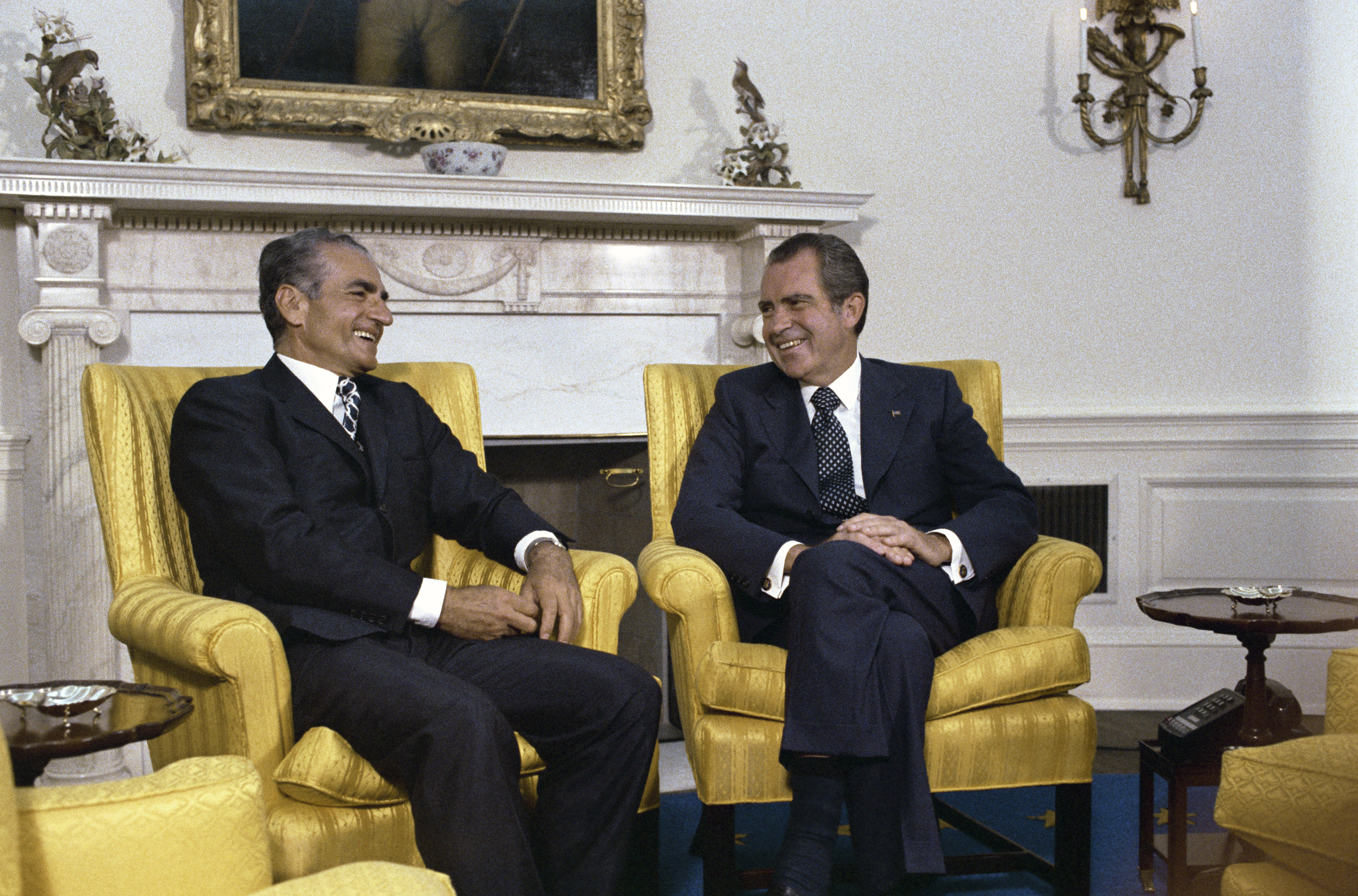
The Shah with Richard Nixon in the Oval Office, 1973

On 7 May 1972, Mohammad Reza told a visiting President Richard Nixon that the Soviet Union was attempting to dominate the Middle East via its close ally Iraq, and that to check Iraqi ambitions would also be to check Soviet ambitions. Nixon agreed to support Iranian claims to have the thalweg in the Shatt al-Arab recognised as the border and to generally back Iran in its confrontation with Iraq. Mohammad Reza financed Kurdish separatist rebels in Iraq, and to cover his tracks, armed them with Soviet weapons which Israel had seized from Soviet-backed Arab regimes, then handed them over to Iran at the Shah's behest. The initial operation was a disaster, but the Shah continued to attempt to support the rebels and weaken Iraq. Then, in 1975, the countries signed the Algiers Accord, which granted Iran equal navigation rights in the Shatt al-Arab as the thalweg was now the new border, while Mohammad Reza agreed to end his support for Iraqi Kurdish rebels. The Shah also maintained close relations with King Hussein of Jordan, President Anwar Sadat of Egypt, and King Hassan II of Morocco. Beginning in 1970, Mohammad Reza formed an unlikely alliance with the militantly left-wing regime of Colonel Muammar Gaddafi of Libya, as both leaders wanted higher oil prices for their nations, leading Iran and Libya to join forces to press for the "leapfrogging" of oil prices.

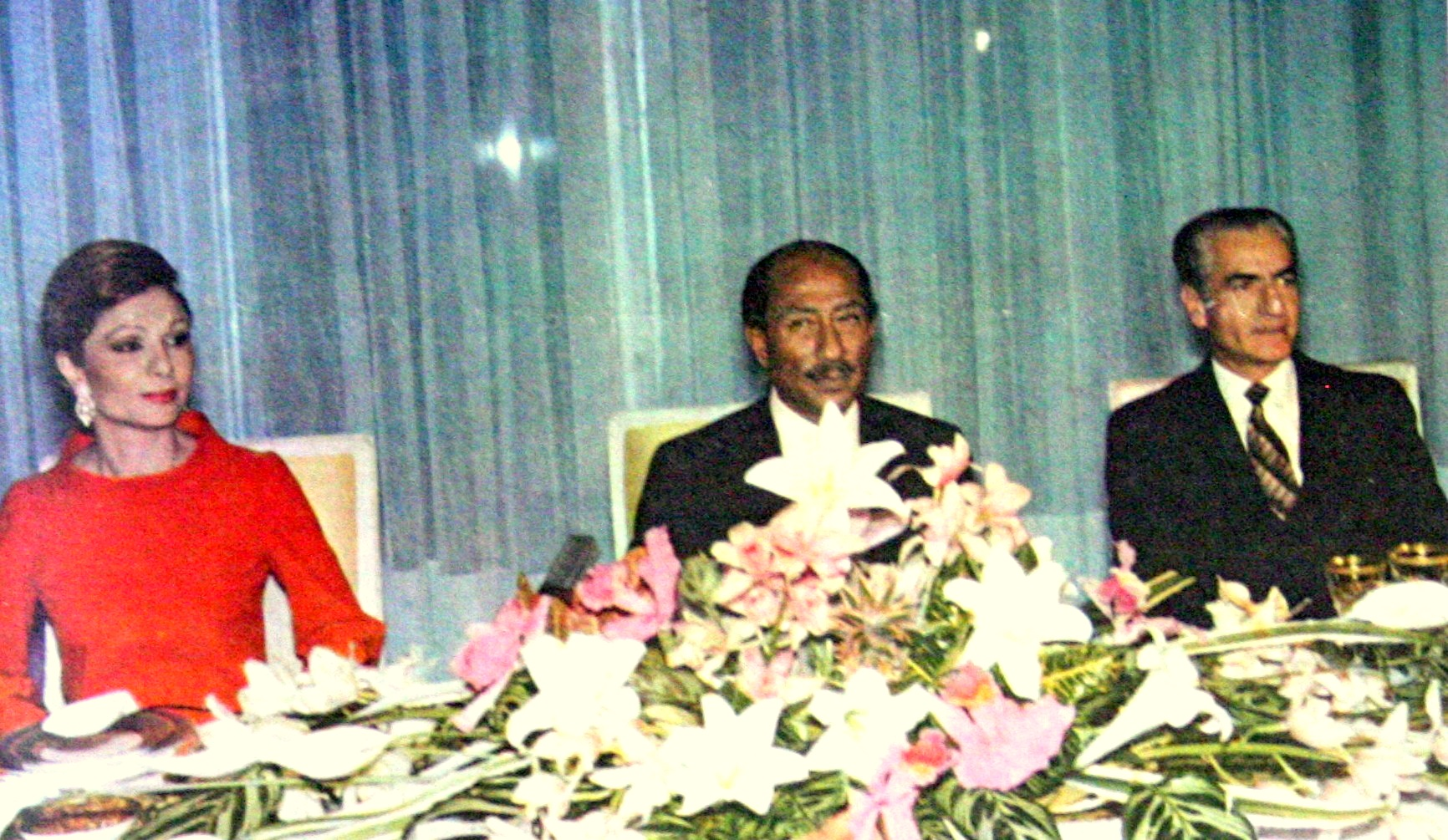
The Shah and Shahbanou meeting Egyptian President Anwar Sadat in Tehran, 1975

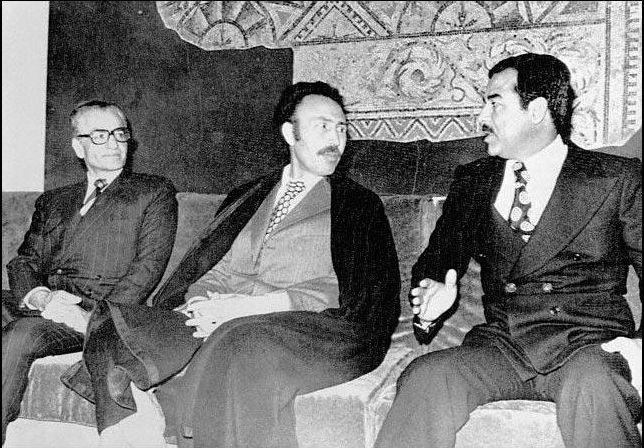
The Shah meeting Algerian President Houari Boumediène and Iraqi Vice President Saddam Hussein in Algiers in order to sign the 1975 Algiers Agreement

The US-Iran relationship grew more contentious as the US became more dependent on Mohammad Reza as a stabilising force in the Middle East, under the Nixon Doctrine. In a July 1969 visit to Guam, President Nixon had announced the Nixon Doctrine, which declared that the United States would honour its treaty commitments in Asia, but "as far as the problems of international security are concerned ... the United States is going to encourage and has a right to expect that this problem will increasingly be handled by, and the responsibility for it taken by, the Asian nations themselves." The particular Asian nation the Nixon Doctrine was aimed at was South Vietnam, but the Shah seized upon the doctrine, with its message that Asian nations should be responsible for their own defence, to argue that the Americans should sell him arms without limitation, a suggestion that Nixon embraced. A particular dynamic was established in American-Iranian relations from 1969 onward, in which the Americans gave in to whatever Mohammad Reza demanded, as they felt they needed a strong Iran as a pro-American force in the Middle East and could not afford to lose Iran as an ally. Further adding to the Shah's confidence was the Sino-Soviet border conflict of 1969, which forced the Red Army to make a major redeployment to the Chinese border. Mohammad Reza, who always feared the prospect of a Soviet invasion, welcomed the Sino-Soviet war and the resulting reduction of Red Army divisions along the Soviet-Iranian border as giving him more room internationally.

Under Nixon, the United States finally agreed to sever all contact with any Iranians opposed to the Shah's regime, a concession that Mohammad Reza had been seeking since 1958. The often very anti-American tone of the Iranian press was ignored because Mohammad Reza supported the US in the Vietnam War. Likewise, the Americans ignored the Shah's efforts to raise oil prices, even though it cost many American consumers more. After 1969, a process of "reverse leverage" set in, when Mohammad Reza began to dictate to the United States as the Americans needed him more than he needed the Americans. The American National Security Advisor Henry Kissinger wrote in 1982 that because of the Vietnam War, it was not politically possible in the 1970s for the United States to fight a major war: "There was no possibility of assigning any American forces to the Indian Ocean in the midst of the Vietnam War and its attendant trauma. Congress would have tolerated no such commitment; the public would not have supported it. Fortunately, Iran was willing to play this role." Consequently, the Americans badly needed Iran as an ally, which allowed Mohammad Reza to dictate to them. This experience greatly boosted the Shah's ego, as he felt he was able to impose his will on the world's most powerful nation.

==== Iran and Israel vs. Iraq ====
The Americans initially rejected Mohammad Reza's suggestion that they join him in supporting the Iraqi Kurdish peshmerga fighting for independence on the grounds that an independent Kurdistan would inspire the Turkish Kurds to rebel, and they had no interest in antagonising the NATO member Turkey. Some of the Shah's advisers also felt it was unwise to support the peshmerga, saying that if the Iraqi Kurds won independence, then the Iranian Kurds would want to join them. When Nixon and Kissinger visited Tehran in May 1972, the Shah convinced them to take a larger role in what had, up to then, been a mainly Israeli-Iranian operation to aid Iraqi Kurds in their struggles against Iraq, against the warnings of the CIA and State Department that the Shah would ultimately betray the Kurds. He did this in March 1975 with the signing of the Algiers Accord that settled Iraqi-Iranian border disputes, an action taken without prior consultation with the US, after which he cut off all aid to the Kurds and prevented the US and Israel from using Iranian territory to provide them assistance.

As a way of increasing pressure on Baghdad, the peshmerga had been encouraged by Iran and the US to abandon guerrilla war for conventional war in April 1974, so the years 1974–75 saw the heaviest fighting between the Iraqi Army and the peshmerga. The sudden cut-off of Iranian support in March 1975 left the Kurds very exposed, causing them to be crushed by Iraq. The British journalist Patrick Brogan wrote that "...the Iraqis celebrated their victory in the usual manner, by executing as many of the rebels as they could lay their hands on." Kissinger later wrote in his memoirs that it was never the intention of the US or Iran to see the peshmerga actually win, as an independent Kurdistan would have created too many problems for both Turkey and Iran; rather, the intention was to "irritate" Iraq enough to force the Iraqis to change their foreign policy.

==== Middle East oil industry ====
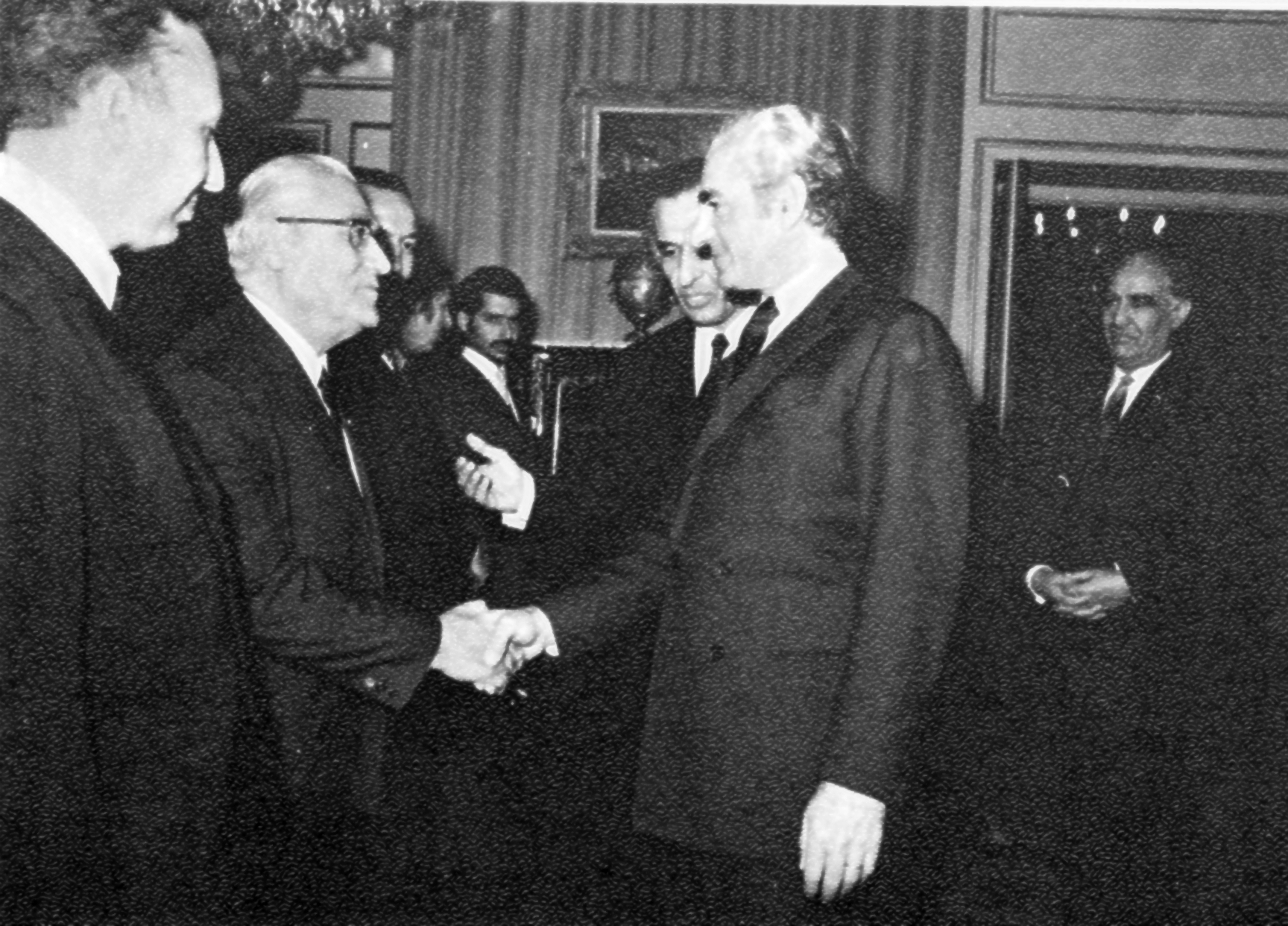
Mohammad Reza Shah shakes hands with members of OPEC in a landmark session in Tehran, 1970

The Shah also used America's dependence on Middle Eastern oil as leverage; although Iran did not participate in the 1973 oil embargo, he purposely increased production in its aftermath to capitalise on the higher prices. In December 1973, only two months after oil prices were raised by 70 per cent, he urged OPEC nations to push prices even higher, which they agreed to do, more than doubling the price. Oil prices increased by 470 per cent over a 12-month period, which also increased Iran's GDP by 50 per cent. Despite personal pleas from President Nixon, the Shah ignored any complaints, claimed the US was importing more oil than at any time in the past, and proclaimed that "the industrial world will have to realise that the era of their terrific progress and even more terrific income and wealth based on cheap oil is finished."

=== Modernization and style of governance ===
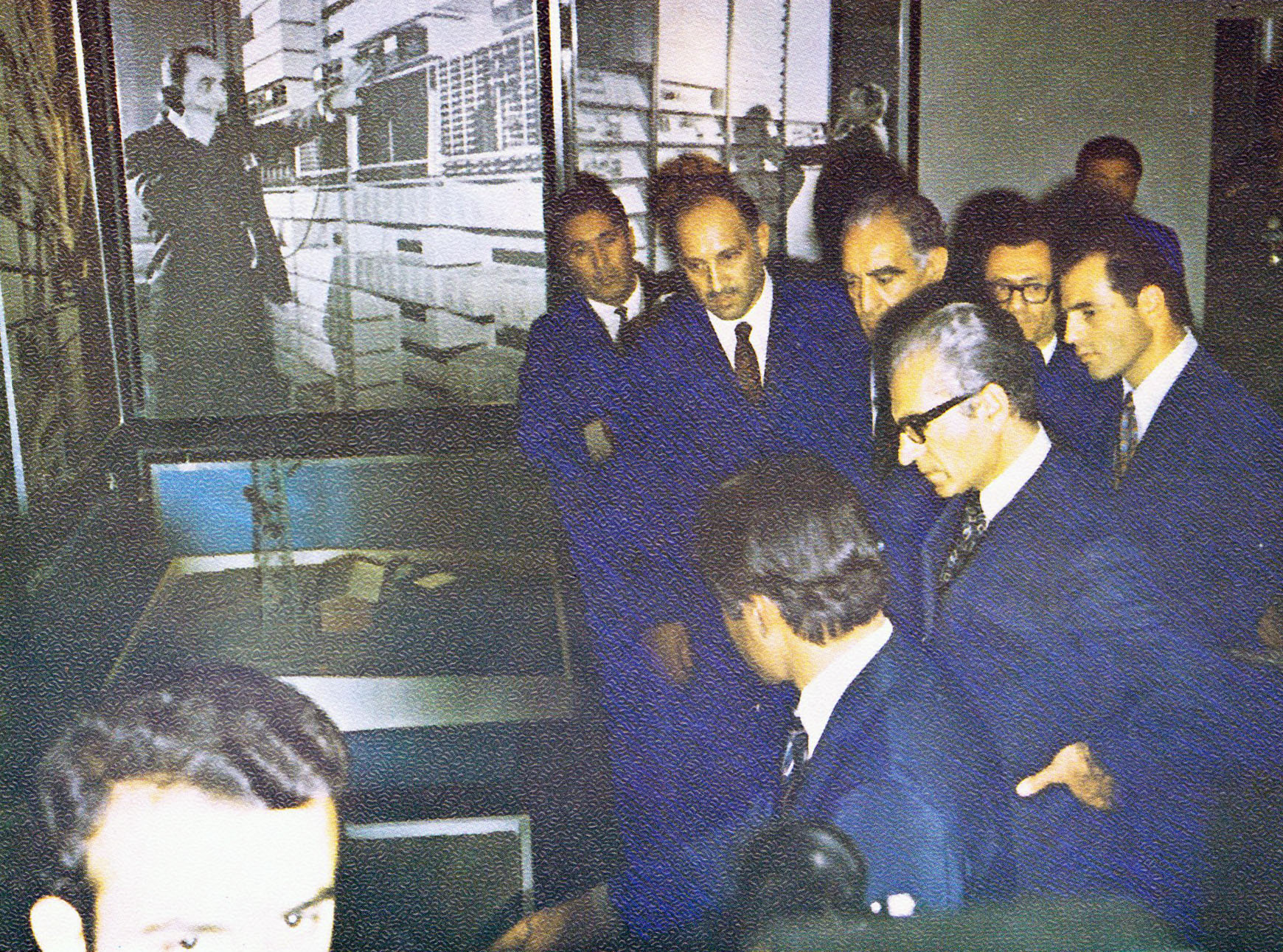
After opening the microwave station, the Shah visits its different departments in 1970

With Iran's great oil wealth, the Shah became the preeminent leader of the Middle East, and self-styled "Guardian" of the Persian Gulf. In 1961, he defended his style of rule, saying, "When Iranians learn to behave like Swedes, I will behave like the King of Sweden."

During the last years of his regime, the Shah's government became more autocratic. In the words of a US Embassy dispatch: "The Shah's picture is everywhere. The beginning of all film showings in public theaters presents the Shah in various regal poses accompanied by the strains of the National Anthem ... The monarch also actively extends his influence to all phases of social affairs ... There is hardly any activity or vocation in which the Shah or members of his family or his closest friends do not have a direct or at least a symbolic involvement. In the past, he had claimed to take a two-party system seriously and declared, 'If I were a dictator rather than a constitutional monarch, then I might be tempted to sponsor a single dominant party such as Hitler organised'."

However, by 1975, Mohammad Reza had abolished the two-party system of government in favour of a one-party state under the Rastakhiz (Resurrection) Party. This was the merger of the New Iran Party, a centre-right party, and the People's Party, a liberal party. The Shah justified his actions by declaring, "We must straighten out Iranians' ranks. To do so, we divide them into two categories: those who believe in Monarchy, the constitution and the Six Bahman Revolution and those who don't ... A person who does not enter the new political party and does not believe in the three cardinal principles will have only two choices. He is either an individual who belongs to an illegal organisation, or is related to the outlawed Tudeh Party, or in other words a traitor. Such an individual belongs to an Iranian prison, or if he desires he can leave the country tomorrow, without even paying exit fees; he can go anywhere he likes, because he is not Iranian, he has no nation, and his activities are illegal and punishable according to the law." In addition, the Shah had decreed that all Iranian citizens and the few remaining political parties become part of Rastakhiz.

=== Image and self-image in the 1970s ===
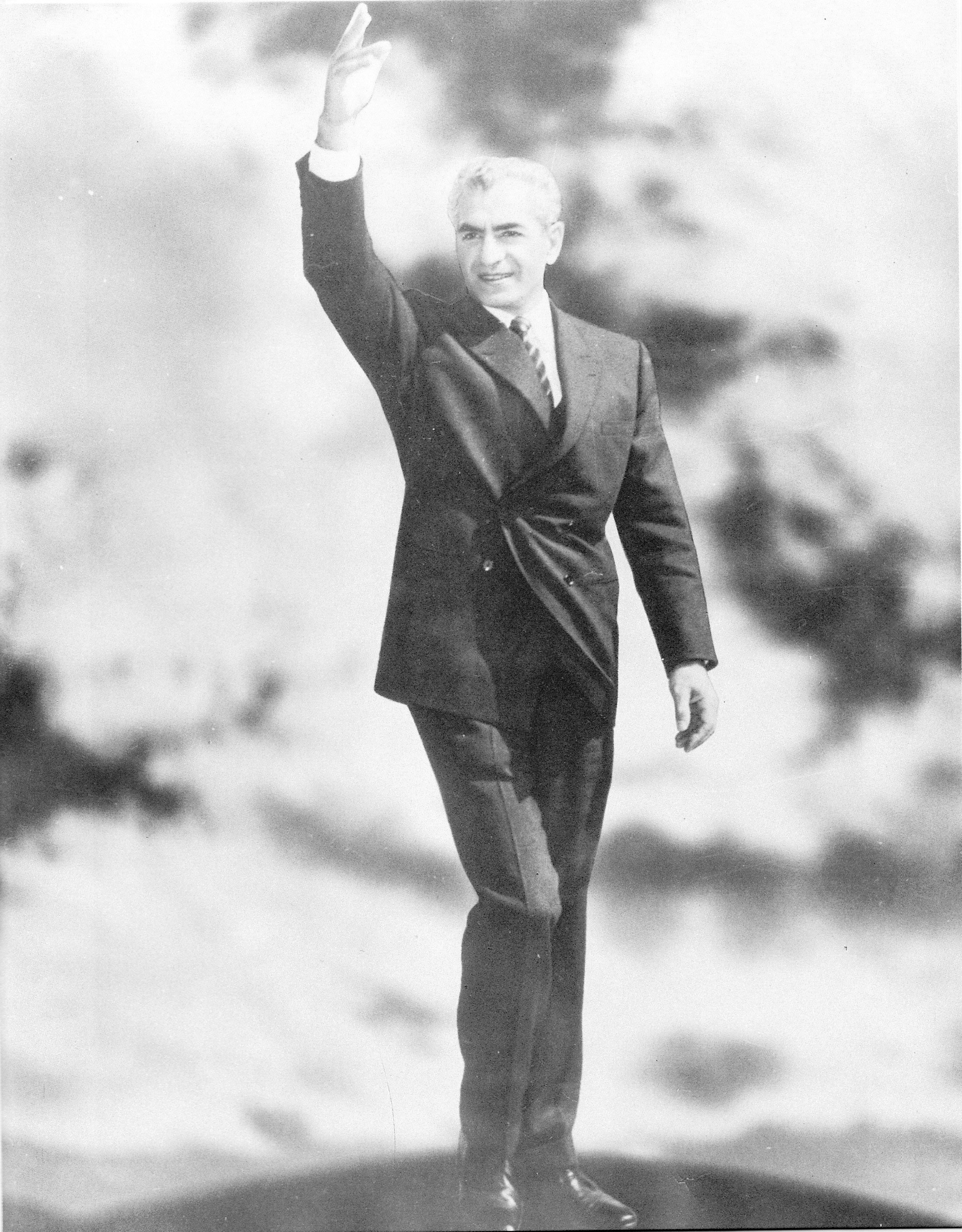
The Shah greeting Iranian civilians during the White Revolution in 1963

From 1973 onward, Mohammad Reza had proclaimed his aim as that of the tamaddon-e-bozorg, the "Great Civilisation", a turning point not only in Iran's history, but also the history of the entire world—a claim that was taken seriously for a time in the West. On 2 December 1974, The New Yorker published an article by Paul Erdman that was a conjectural future history entitled "The Oil War of 1976: How The Shah Won the World: The World as We Knew It Came to an End When the Shah Of Iran Decided to Restore The Glory of Ancient Persia with Western Arms". In 1975, US Vice President Nelson Rockefeller declared in a speech: "We must take His Imperial Majesty to the United States for a couple of years so that he can teach us how to run a country." In 1976, a pulp novel by Alan Williams was published in the United States under the title A Bullet for the Shah: All They Had To Do Was Kill the World's Most Powerful Man, whose sub-title reveals much about how the American people viewed the Shah at the time (the original British title was the more prosaic Shah-Mak).

The great wealth generated by Iran's oil encouraged a sense of nationalism at the Imperial Court. Empress Farah recalled her days as a university student in 1950s France about being asked where she was from:

When I told them Iran ... the Europeans would recoil in horror as if Iranians were barbarians and loathsome. But after Iran became wealthy under the Shah in the 1970s, Iranians were courted everywhere. Yes, Your Majesty. Of course, Your Majesty. If you please, Your Majesty. Fawning all over us. Greedy sycophants. Then they loved Iranians.

Mohammad Reza shared the empress's sentiments as Westerners came begging to his court looking for his largesse, leading him to remark in 1976:

Now we are the masters and our former masters are our slaves. Everyday [sic?] they beat a track to our door begging for favors. How can they be of assistance? Do we want arms? Do we want nuclear power stations? We have only to answer, and they will fulfill our wishes.

Because the House of Pahlavi were a parvenu house – as Reza Khan had begun his career as a private in the Persian Army, rising up to the rank of general, taking power in a coup d'état in 1921, and making himself shah in 1925 – Mohammad Reza was keen to gain the approval of the older royal families of the world, and was prepared to spend large sums of money to gain that social acceptance.

Amongst the royalty that came to Tehran looking for the Shah's generosity were King Hussein of Jordan, the former King Constantine II of Greece, King Hassan II of Morocco, the princes and princesses of the Dutch House of Orange, and the Italian Princess Maria Gabriella of Savoy, whom the Shah had once courted in the 1950s. He coveted the British Order of the Garter, and had, prior to courting Maria Gabriella, inquired about marrying Princess Alexandra of Kent, granddaughter of King George V, but in both cases he was rebuffed in no uncertain terms. As an Iranian, Mohammad Reza greatly enjoyed supporting the Greek branch of the House of Glücksburg, knowing the Greeks still celebrated their victories over the Persians in the 5th and 4th centuries BC. He enjoyed close relations with Emperor Haile Selassie of Ethiopia, as demonstrated by the fact that he was the guest of honour at the Persepolis celebrations in 1971. Ethiopia and Iran, along with Turkey and Israel, were envisioned as an "alliance of the periphery" that would constrain Arab power in the greater Middle East.

In an era of high oil prices, Iran's economy boomed while the economies of the Western nations were trapped in stagflation (economic stagnation and inflation) after the 1973–74 oil shocks, which seemed to prove the greatness of Mohammad Reza both to himself and to the rest of the world. In 1975, both the British Prime Minister Harold Wilson and the French President Valéry Giscard d'Estaing made pleading phone calls to Mohammad Reza asking him for loans, which ultimately led the Shah to give a US$1 billion loan to the United Kingdom and another US$1 billion to France. In a televised speech in January 1975 explaining why he was lending Britain a sum equal to US$1 billion, Mohammad Reza declared in his usual grandiose style: "I have known the most dark hours when our country was obliged to pass under the tutelage of foreign powers, amongst them England. Now I find that England has not only become our friend, our equal, but also the nation to which, should we be able, we will render assistance with pleasure," going on to say that since he "belonged to this [European] world," he did not want Europe to collapse economically. As Britain had often dominated Iran in the past, the change in roles was greatly gratifying to Mohammad Reza.

Courtiers at the Imperial court were devoted to stroking the Shah's ego, competing to be the most sycophantic, with Mohammad Reza being regularly assured he was a greater leader than his much admired General de Gaulle, that democracy was doomed, and that based on Rockefeller's speech, that the American people wanted Mohammad Reza to be their leader, as well as doing such a great job as Shah of Iran. According to historian Abbas Milani, all of this praise boosted Mohammad Reza's ego, and he went from being a merely narcissistic man to a megalomaniac, believing himself a man chosen by Allah Himself to transform Iran and create the "Great Civilisation". When one of the Shah's courtiers suggested launching a campaign to award him the Nobel Peace Prize, he wrote on the margin: "If they beg us, we might accept. They give the Nobel to kaka siah ["any black face"] these days. Why should we belittle ourselves with this?" Befitting all this attention and praise, Mohammad Reza started to make increasingly outlandish claims for the "Great Civilisation", telling the Italian journalist Oriana Fallaci in a 1973 interview with L'Europeo:

Halfway measures, compromises, are unfeasible. In other words, either one is a revolutionary or one demands law and order. One can't be a revolutionary with law and order. And even less with tolerance ... when Castro came to power, he killed at least 10,000 people ... in a sense, he was really capable, because he's still in power. So am I, however! And I intend to stay there, and to demonstrate that one can achieve a great many things by the use of force, show even that your old socialism is finished. Old, obsolete, finished ... I achieve more than the Swedes ... Huh! Swedish socialism! It didn't even nationalize forests and water. But I have ... my White Revolution ... is a new original kind of socialism and ... believe me, in Iran we're far more advanced than you and we really have nothing to learn from you.

In an interview with Der Spiegel published on 3 February 1974, Mohammad Reza declared: "I would like you to know that in our case, our actions are not just to take vengeance on the West. As I said, we are going to be a member of your club". In a press conference on 31 March 1974, Mohammad Reza predicted what Iran would be like in 1984, saying:

In the cities, electric cars would replace the gas engines and mass transportation systems would be switched to electricity, monorail over the ground or electric buses. And, furthermore, in the great era of civilization that lies ahead of our people, there will be least two or three holidays a week.

In 1976, Mohammad Reza told the Egyptian journalist Mohamed Hassanein Heikal in an interview: "I want the standard of living in Iran in ten years' time to be exactly on a level with that in Europe today. In twenty years' time we shall be ahead of the United States".

Reflecting his need to have Iran seen as "part of the world" (by which Mohammad Reza meant the western world), all through the 1970s he sponsored conferences in Iran at his expense, with for example in one week in September 1975 the International Literacy Symposium meeting in Persepolis, the International Congress of Philosophy meeting in Mashhad and the International Congress of Mithraic Studies meeting in Tehran. He also sought to hold the 1984 Summer Olympics in Tehran. For most ordinary Iranians, struggling with inflation, poverty, air pollution, having to pay extortion payments to the police who demanded money from even those performing legal jobs such as selling fruits on the street, and daily traffic jams, the Shah's sponsorship of international conferences was just a waste of money and time. Meanwhile between 1950 and 1979, real GDP per capita nearly tripled from about $2700 to about $7700 (2011 international dollars), with heavy investments in education, science, and infrastructure. Furthermore, conferences on pre-Islamic practices such as the cult of Mithra fuelled religious anxieties. Though Mohammad Reza envisioned the "Great Civilisation" of a modernised Iran whose standard of living would be higher than that of the United States and at the forefront of modern technology, he did not envision any political change, making it clear that Iran would remain an autocracy.

== Achievements ==
=== Education and military ===
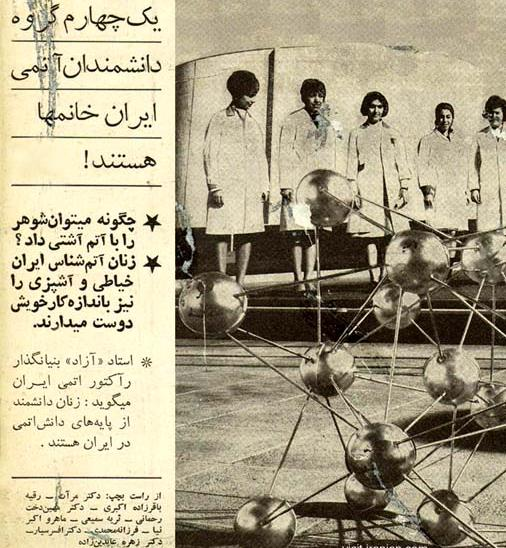
Iranian newspaper clip from 1968, reading: "A quarter of Iran's nuclear energy scientists are women", a marked change in women's rights

Improvement of the educational system was made through the creation of new elementary schools. In addition, literacy courses were set up in remote villages by the Imperial Iranian Armed Forces, this initiative being called "Sepāh-e Dānesh" (Persian: سپاه دانش) meaning "Army of Knowledge". The Armed Forces were also engaged in infrastructural and other educational projects throughout the country "Sepāh-e Tarvij va Ābādāni" (Persian: سپاه ترویج و آبادانی lit. army for promotion and development) as well as in health education and promotion "Sepāh-e Behdāsht" (Persian: سپاه بهداشت lit. "army for hygiene"). The Shah instituted exams for Islamic theologians to become established clerics. Many Iranian university students were sent to and supported in foreign, especially Western, countries and the Indian subcontinent.

Between 1967 and 1977, the number of universities increased in number from 7 to 22, the number of institutions of advanced learning rose from 47 to 200, and the number of students in higher education soared from 36,742 to 100,000. Literacy rose substantially over the same period, though from a low base and unevenly: national census data put the literacy rate at 39.2 percent for men and 17.4 percent for women in 1966, rising to 47.5 percent and 35.5 percent respectively by 1976.

In the field of diplomacy, Iran realised and maintained friendly relations with Western and East European countries as well as Israel and China and became, especially through its close friendship with the United States, more and more a hegemonial power in the Persian Gulf region and the Middle East.

As to infrastructure and technology, the Shah continued and developed further the policies introduced by his father. His programmes included projects in technologies such as steel, telecommunications, petrochemical facilities, power plants, dams and the automobile industry. The Aryamehr University of Technology was established as a major new academic institution.

=== Nuclear program ===
The Shah also led a massive military build-up and began the construction of many nuclear facilities. By 1977, Iran was considered the fifth strongest nation in the world according to a report by Georgetown University. The Shah announced the days of foreign exploitation in Iran were over and exclaimed statements such as: "Nobody can dictate to us", and "Nobody can wave a finger at us because we will wave back."

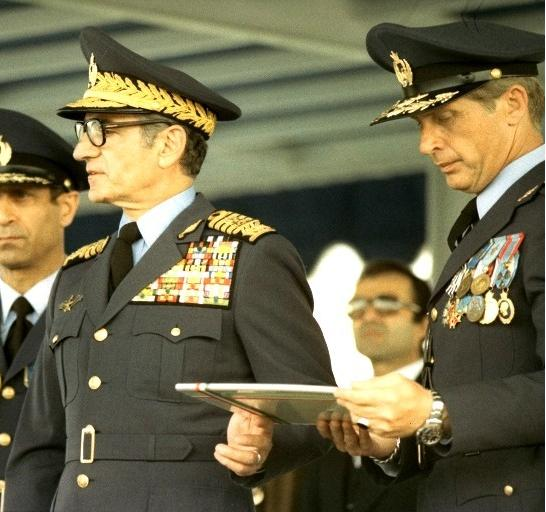
Mohammad Reza Shah in the IIAF uniform alongside IIAF generals Nader Jahanbani and Mohammad Amir Khatami, c. 1975

The Shah sought to protect Iran's interests through various means such as funding foreign rebellions in Iraq, military support in Oman, financial/military action, and diplomacy, prompting the CIA to conclude that:

In summary, thanks to the Shah himself and oil resources, Iran is well on its way to playing a leading role in the Mid East with a modernized elite, large economic resources and strong forces. Succession is always a question in an authoritarian regime, even a benevolent one, but each year reinforces the social and political momentum in the direction the Shah has set. I believe the US can keep close to and benefit from this process and even influence Iran toward a positive regional and world role rather than a bid for area hegemony or other adventurism.

Despite criticism from Western skeptics, the Shah came to be seen, particularly in the two superpowers and other European powers, as a master statesman through his domestic reforms, popular base in Iran, successful opposition to radical Arab neighbors, and ambitions for regional stability and prosperity. The fall of the Pahlavi order in 1979 removed the Shah's stabilizing efforts, leading to the Soviet invasion of Afghanistan, the destabilization of Pakistani politics, the emergence of Saudi Arabia as a major oil power, the rise of Saddam Hussein and Ba'athists in regional conflicts, and the subsequent Wahhabi-Salafi militancy.

=== Economic reforms ===
Under the Shah's leadership, Iran experienced an impressive transformation of the economy. From 1925 to 1976 Iran's economy had grown 700 times, per capita 200 times, and domestic capital formation 3,400 times most of which occurred during the reign of the second Pahlavi Monarch, Mohammad Reza Pahlavi. Iran enjoyed an average annual industrial growth rate of over 20% from 1963 to 1976. From 1965 to 1976 Iranian per capita income rose 8 times from $195 to $1,600. By 1978 per capita income surpassed $2,400. Much of the growth was not due to oil income. Among the OPEC oil-producing nations experts agreed only Iran's growth was due to an intelligent development plan while the growth seen in nations such as Saudi Arabia and Libya was solely based upon oil revenues. Iran's growth was expected to continue, with half of the Iranian families expected to own cars by 1985, per capita income reaching $4,500 ($13,471 adjusted for inflation), Iran would produce twenty million tons of steel annually, one million tons of aluminum, one million cars, three million television sets, one million tons of paper, and a large number of engineers.

Iranian women in Tehran, 1971

During the Shah's rule, Iran's average income level was nearing that of Western European nations, and Iranians experienced an unprecedented amount of prosperity and opportunity with an emerging middle class. Iran's growing prosperity coupled with goals of independence allowed for increasing autonomy from Western nations like the US. From 1963 to 1977 Iran experienced an average annual growth rate of 10.5% making it one of the world's fastest-growing economies and Iran experienced its largest GDP growth ever. The economic growth was not simply based on oil, in fact, non-oil revenues grew at a faster rate of 11.5% annually.

During the 1960s and 1970s, Iran's society and the economy experienced a great transformation as a result of rapid industrialization. The state invested in infrastructure to develop industry and provided financial capital resulting in profitable conditions for private Iranian companies. As a result, Iran's development across the industrialization scale, technological advancement, economic growth, urbanization, and per capita income increase was extraordinary compared to other developing nations. World Bank data during this period reveals Iran had an annual real growth rate of 9.6% for middle-income categories which was the highest of any other country in the developing world. Investment, savings, consumption, employment, and per capita income also demonstrated exceptional growth. Gross domestic investment grew at an average yearly rate of 16% and reached 33% of the GDP by 1977–1978. Iranian consumption grew on average by 18% a year. Iran's middle class was far larger than any other developing country. Iran's economic growth was compared to that of rapidly industrializing Asian countries such as South Korea. Since the revolution, Iran's economic growth and rapid industrialization have plummeted, largely due to Western sanctions.

During the early 1970s, with the success of the Shah's White Revolution, Iran had become a country of economic opportunity, and its international status was rising. From 1959 and 1970 the gross national product (GNP) approximately tripled rising from $3.8 to $10.6 billion and by the late 1960s Iran become one of the middle east's most flourishing spots for investment among foreign investors due to financial stability and rise in purchasing power. Many foreign powers struggled to compete for relations with Iran due to the rising potential of its growing marketplace. Iran Air also became one of the fastest growing airlines in the world and many Iranian construction companies some funded by the state had been involved in many construction projects such as Pre-Fab Inc. which created the precast concrete benches for the Āryāmehr Stadium.

== Overthrow ==
=== Background ===
The overthrow of the Shah came as a surprise to almost all observers. The first militant anti-Shah demonstrations of a few hundred started in October 1977, after the death of Khomeini's son Mostafa. On 7 January 1978, an article "Iran and Red and Black Colonization" was published in the newspaper Ettela'at attacking Ruhollah Khomeini, who was in exile in Iraq at the time; it referred to him as a homosexual, a drug addict, and a British spy, and claimed he was an Indian, not an Iranian. Khomeini's supporters had brought in audio tapes of his sermons, and Mohammad Reza was angry with one sermon, alleging corruption on his part, and decided to hit back with the article, despite the feeling at the court, SAVAK, and Ettela'at editors that the article was an unnecessary provocation that was going to cause trouble. The next day, protests against the article began in the city of Qom, a traditional centre of opposition to the House of Pahlavi.

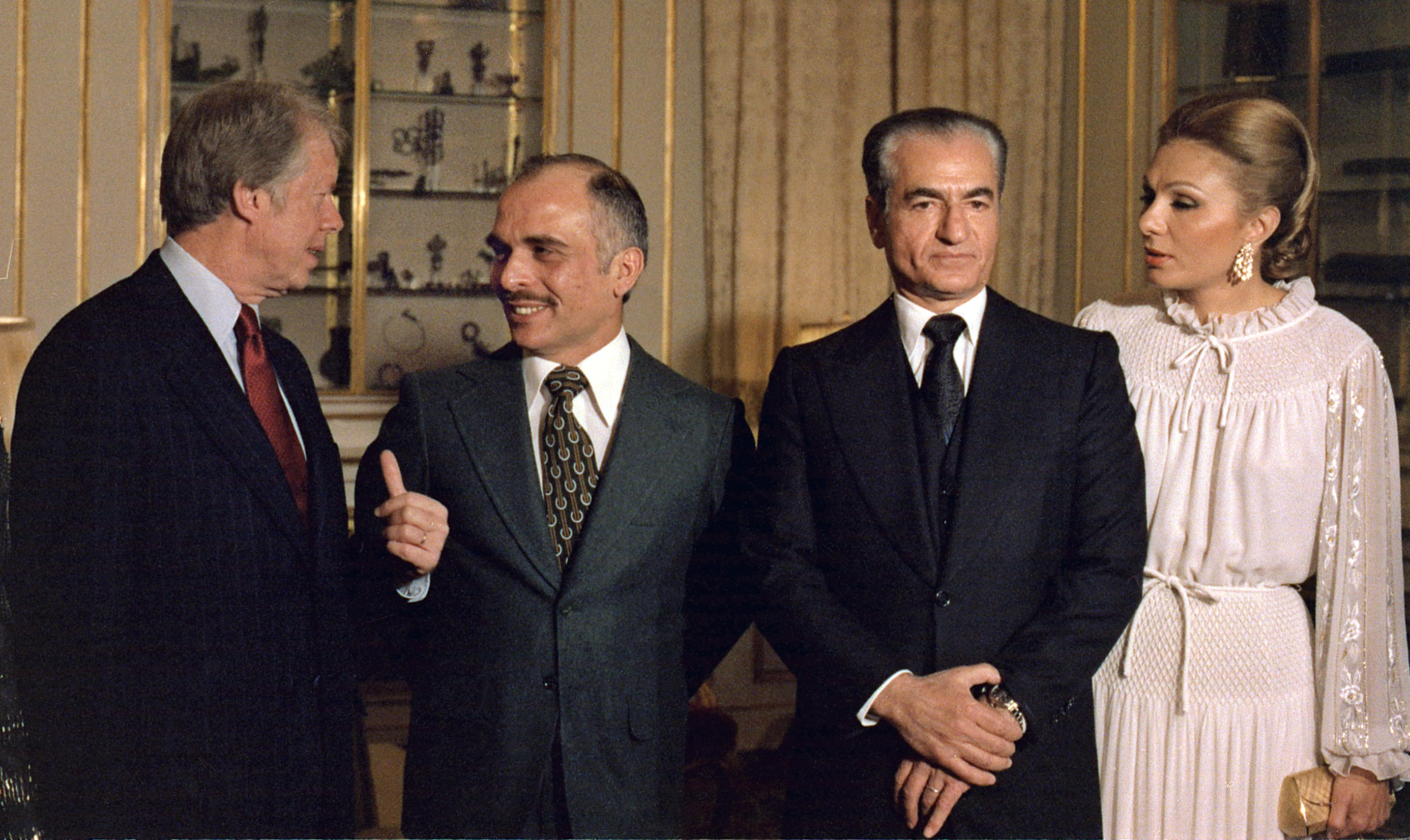
Tehran on 31 December 1977: Mohammad Reza and Farah with New Year's guests King Hussein and President Jimmy Carter

=== Reza's cancer diagnosis ===
In 1974, the Shah's doctor, Abdol Karim Ayadi, diagnosed the Shah with splenomegaly after he complained of a swollen abdomen. On 1 May 1974, French professor Dr. Georges Flandrin flew to Tehran to treat the Shah. On the first visit, Flandrin was able to diagnose the Shah with chronic lymphocytic leukemia. The Shah's diagnosis of cancer would not be revealed to him until 1978. Medical reports given to the Shah were falsified and altered in order to state that the Shah was in good health, to conceal his cancer from him. In 1976, the Shah met with French physicians in Zurich; they were disturbed by his abnormal blood count. They discovered he was being treated with the wrong medication, worsening his condition.

As his health worsened, from the spring of 1978, the Shah stopped appearing in public, with the official explanation being that he was suffering from a "persistent cold". In May 1978, the Shah suddenly cancelled a long-planned trip to Hungary and Bulgaria. He spent the entire summer of 1978 in Ramsar Palace at Ramsar, the Caspian Sea resort town, where two of France's most prominent doctors, Jean Bernard and Georges Flandrin, treated his cancer. To try to stop his cancer, Bernard and Flandrin had Shah Mohammad Reza take prednisone, a drug with numerous potential side effects including depression and impaired thinking.

As nationwide protests and strikes swept Iran, the imperial court found it nearly impossible to get decisions from the increasingly reclusive Shah, as he became utterly passive and indecisive, content to spend hours listlessly staring into space as he rested by the Caspian Sea while the revolution raged. The seclusion of the Shah, who normally loved the limelight, sparked all sorts of rumors about the state of his health and damaged the imperial mystique, as the man who had been presented as a god-like ruler was revealed to be fallible. A July 1978 attempt to deny the rumors of Shah Mohammad Reza's declining health (by publishing a crudely doctored photograph in the newspapers of the Emperor and Empress walking on the beach) instead further damaged the imperial mystique, as most people realised that what appeared to be two beach clogs on either side of the Shah were merely substitutes inserted for his airbrushed aides, who were holding him up as he now had difficulty walking by himself.

In June 1978, Shah Mohammad Reza's French doctors first revealed to the French government how serious his cancer was, and in September, the French government informed the American government that the Shah was dying of cancer; until then, US officials had no idea that Mohammad Reza had even been diagnosed with cancer four years earlier. The Shah had created a very centralised system in which he was the key decision-maker on all issues, and as historian Abbas Milani noted, he was mentally disabled in the summer of 1978 owing to his tendency to be indecisive when faced with a crisis which, combined with his cancer and the effects of the anti-cancer drugs, made his mood "increasingly volatile and unpredictable. One day, he was full of verve and optimism and the next day or hour he fell into a catatonic stupor", bringing the entire government to a halt. Milani wrote that the Shah was in 1978 "beset with depression, indecision and paralysis, and his indecision led to the immobilisation of the entire system." Empress Farah grew so frustrated with her husband that she suggested numerous times that he leave Iran for medical treatment and appoint her as regent, saying she would handle the crisis and save the House of Pahlavi. Mohammad Reza vetoed this idea, saying he did not want Farah to be a "Joan of Arc", and it would be too humiliating for him as a man to flee Iran and leave a woman in charge.

=== Nationwide riots and strikes ===
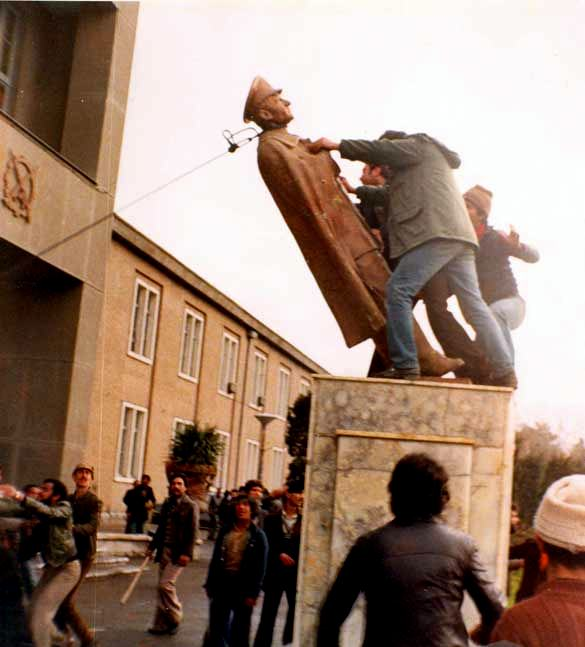
Supporters of the revolution remove a statue of the Shah at the University of Tehran, 1978

The Shah-centred command structure of the Iranian military and the lack of training to confront civil unrest were marked by disaster and bloodshed. There were several instances where army units had opened fire, the most significant being the events on 8 September 1978. That day, at least 64 and perhaps 100 or more people were shot dead, and the Pahlavi military injured 205 in Jaleh Square. The deaths were described as the pivotal event in the Iranian Revolution that ended any "hope for compromise" between the protest movement and the monarchy.

Hoping to quell the growing unrest, the Shah granted a general amnesty to dissidents living abroad on 2 October 1978, including Khomeini, but the measure did little to stem opposition to the monarchy. That same month, widespread strikes by essential workers brought the oil industry, the government's principal source of revenue, to a standstill. The military had no contingency plans to address the disruption, which pushed Iran to the brink of economic collapse. Following Sharif-Emami’s resignation on 6 November, the Shah appointed General Gholam Reza Azhari as prime minister to head a military-dominated cabinet. The televised speech announcing the appointment, drafted by scholar Seyyed Hossein Nasr and state television director Reza Ghotbi, included the declaration:

"As King and as an Iranian, I cannot reject the revolution of the Iranian nation. […] As King, I have sworn an oath to protect our territorial integrity, national unity and Shia Islam. Once again, I swear an oath to the Iranian nation, and assure you that past mistakes, injustice and corruption will not be repeated, and that the damage caused by these mistakes will be rectified. […] I have heard the voice of your revolution, Iranian nation. I will protect the constitutional monarchy, which is a divine gift, and I will safeguard that for which you have made sacrifices. I guarantee that the Iranian government will be based on the constitution and social justice, far removed from all tyranny, oppression and corruption."

In a further concession to the opposition, the Shah ordered the arrest of the former prime minister Amir-Abbas Hoveyda and several senior government officials on 7 November, a move that both emboldened his opponents and demoralized his supporters. In December 1978, during the Shia holy month of Muharram, an estimated of six to nine million Iranians—around 20% of the population—participated in demonstrations against the monarchy. U.S. Treasury Secretary W. Michael Blumenthal, who met with the Shah around this time, reported to President Jimmy Carter that the monarch looked like a "ghost".

=== Collapse of the monarchy ===
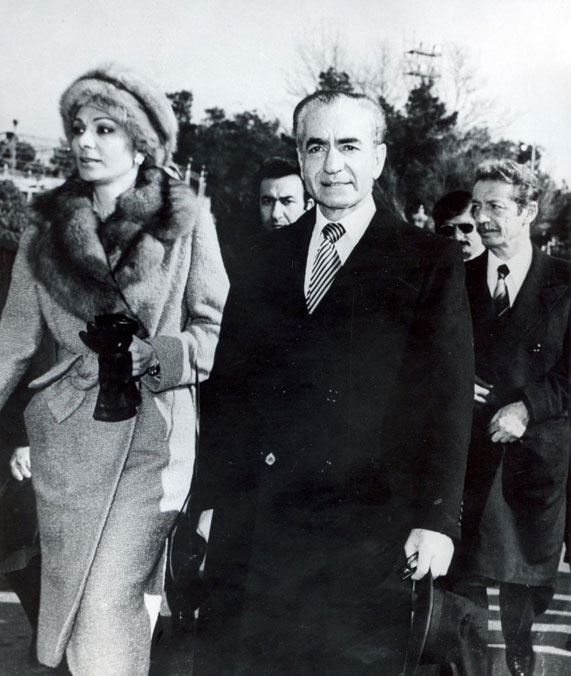
The Shah and Shahbanou at Mehrabad Airport moments before departing Iran, 16 January 1979

By late December 1978, the Shah learned that the military's loyalty could no longer be assured, as several of his generals had begun making overtures to the revolutionary leaders. In desperation, he approached veteran National Front politician Gholam Hossein Sadighi to lead a transitional civilian government that would hold elections for a constituent assembly to determine the monarchy's future. Despite opposition from other National Front leaders, Sadighi was willing to become prime minister to "save" Iran, fearing the consequences of the monarchy's collapse. During negotiations, he insisted that the Shah remain in Iran to ensure the military's loyalty, but the two failed to reach an agreement. The royal court subsequently turned to Shapour Bakhtiar, who was sworn in as prime minister on 6 January 1979. Like Sadighi, Bakhtiar was affiliated with the National Front and feared that the monarchy's immediate collapse would bring Islamists or communists to power. Unlike Sadighi, however, Bakhtiar encouraged the Shah to proceed with his plans to leave Iran.

On 16 January 1979, the Shah publicly announced that he was departing for a brief "vacation" and that a regency council would exercise his duties during his absence. Before leaving Niavaran Palace, he reportedly wept as he bid farewell to palace staff and close associates, many of whom also broke down in tears. He also canceled a planned press conference with foreign journalists, reportedly fearing that he would become too emotional to address them. At Mehrabad Airport, the Shah and Shahbanou were seen off by Bakhtiar, senior military officers, and court officials. Before departing for Egypt aboard the royal aircraft, the Shah reportedly told Bakhtiar, "I hope you will succeed. I give Iran into your care, yours and God's." News of the royal family's departure prompted celebrations across Iran, with crowds filling the streets, sounding car horns, and tearing down symbols of the monarchy.

In the days following the Shah's departure, Bakhtiar dissolved SAVAK, released political prisoners, and permitted Khomeini to return from exile in France on 1 February. Bakhtiar offered Khomeini a Vatican-like state in Qom, promised free elections, and called on the opposition to uphold the Iranian constitution, proposing a "national unity" government that would include Khomeini's followers. Khomeini rejected the proposal and formed a rival interim government, headed by Bakhtiar's colleague Mehdi Bazargan, declaring, "I will appoint a state. I will act against this government. With the nation's support, I will appoint a state." After days of intense street fighting, during which pro-Khomeini revolutionary groups and mutinous soldiers gained the upper hand, the military declared its neutrality on the evening of 11 February, marking the collapse of the monarchy.

== Exile ==
=== Early months ===
During his second exile, the Shah traveled between several countries seeking temporary residence. He first flew from Tehran to Aswan, Egypt, where he received a warm welcome from President Anwar Sadat. He subsequently traveled to Marrakesh, Morocco, as a guest of King Hassan II, to whom he had previously extended an interest-free loan of $110 million. The Shah expected Hassan to reciprocate his generosity, but as Richard Bordeaux Parker, the U.S. ambassador to Morocco, observed, "The Moroccans believed the Shah was worth about $2 billion, and they wanted to take their share of the loot". After leaving Morocco on 30 March 1979, the Shah resided on Paradise Island in the Bahamas, before arriving in Cuernavaca, Mexico, on 10 June on a six-month visa. Former U.S. president Nixon visited him in Mexico.

=== Decline of health ===
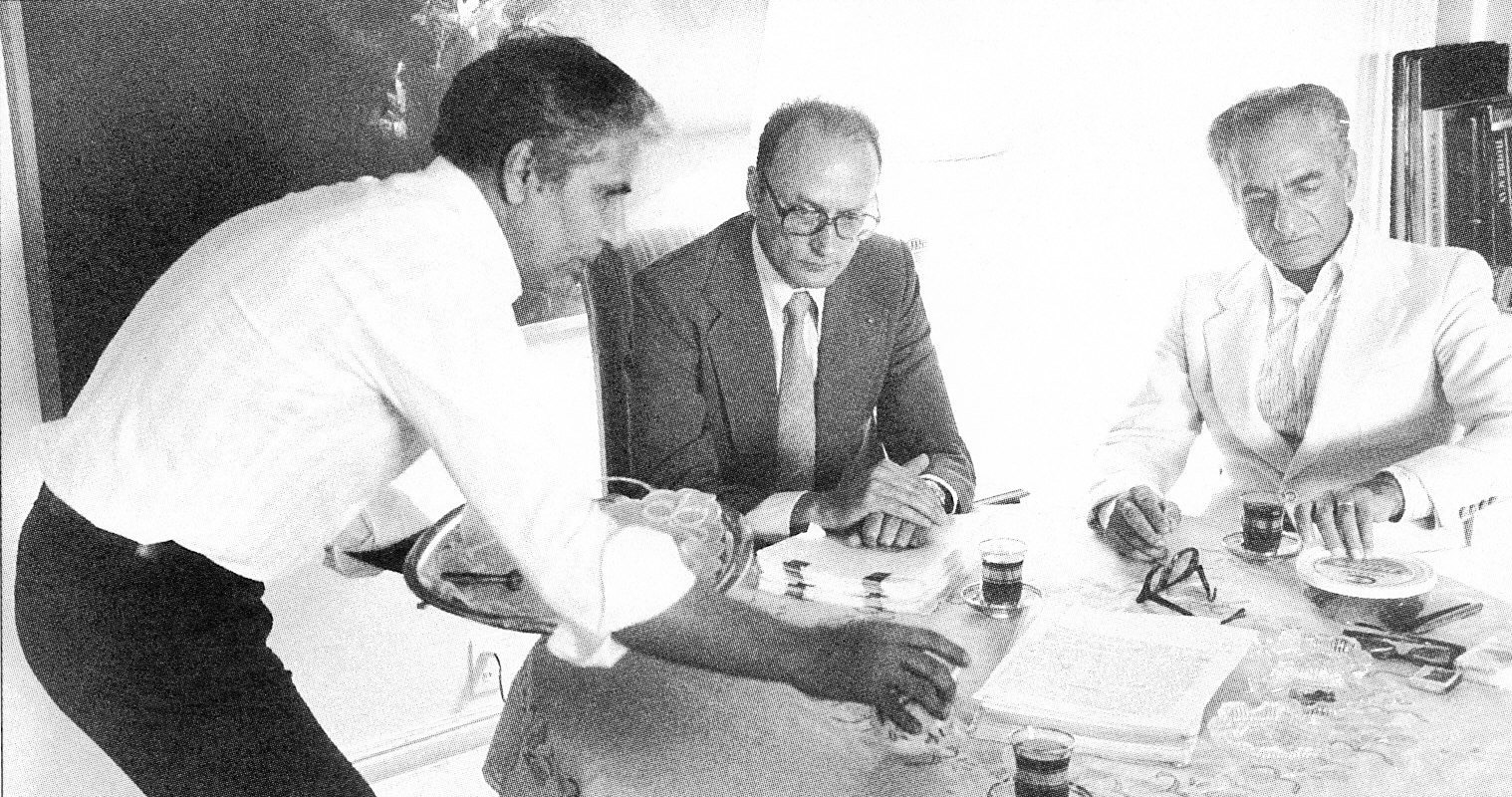
The Shah in Cuernavaca, Mexico, in 1979

By the summer of 1979, the Shah suffered from gallstones that required prompt surgery. Despite being offered treatment in Switzerland, he insisted on receiving treatment in the United States. President Carter was reluctant to admit the Shah to the United States but came under pressure from Henry Kissinger, who telephoned Carter and threatened to withhold his endorsement of the politically contentious SALT II treaty, which Carter had recently signed with the Soviet Union, unless the Shah was admitted. Kissinger's pressure reportedly prompted Carter to hang up the phone in anger on more than on occasion, and shout "Fuck the Shah!" in the Oval Office.

The Shah concealed his cancer diagnosis from his Mexican physicians, who consequently misdiagnosed his illness as malaria and prescribed antimalarial medication. The treatment did nothing to address his cancer, and his health further deteriorated rapidly as he lost 30 pounds (14 kg). In September 1979, a physician sent by David Rockefeller informed the U.S. State Department that the Shah urgently needed to medical treatment in the United States. This assessment was disputed by the Shah's physician, Ben Kean, who maintained that the necessary medical equipment for his cancer was available in Mexico and that the principal obstacle was the Shah's unwillingness to disclose his diagnosis. Kean later described the Shah's condition at the time:

The Shah's appearance was stunningly worse... Clearly he had obstructive jaundice. The odds favored gallstones, since his fever, chills and abdominal distress suggested an infection of the biliary tract. Also he had a history of indigestion. Besides the probable obstruction—he now had been deeply jaundiced for six to eight weeks—he was emaciated and suffering from hard tumor nodes in the neck and a swollen spleen, signs that his cancer was worsening, and he had severe anemia and very low white blood [cell] counts.

Amid intense lobbying by Rockefeller and Kissinger for the Shah's admission to the United States, the State Department warned Carter against admitting him, arguing that doing so would likely provoke that the seizure of the U.S. Embassy in Tehran. Historian Abbas Milani suggested that Rockefeller may have had a conflict of interest, noting that his Chase Manhattan Bank had extended a questionable $500 million loan to Iran in 1978 and that a potential embassy seizure would likely prompt the U.S. government to freeze Iranian financial assets, including those held at Chase.

=== Treatment in the United States ===
Despite strong objections from the Iranian government and his own reluctance, Carter allowed the Shah to enter the United States on 22 October 1979 for surgical treatment at Weill Cornell Medical Center in New York City. During his stay, the Shah used an alias and, having lost the ability to walk, had to be transported in a wheelchair under the cover of darkness, concealed beneath a blanket for security reasons. He became increasingly preoccupied with news from Iran, and was deeply distressed by the rapid sociopolitical changes introduced by the Islamic Republic. Groups of Iranian students gathered outside his hospital, chanting "Death to the Shah!", which he could hear from his room.

As feared by the White House, student supporters of Khomeini stormed the U.S. Embassy in Tehran on 4 November and seized American personnel, triggering the Iran hostage crisis. The Shah's continued presence in the United States thus became an obstacle to the Carter administration's efforts to secure the hostages' release, as the Iranian government demanded his return to stand trial. On 2 December, he was transported aboard a U.S. Air Force jet to Wilford Hall Medical Center at Lackland Air Force Base near San Antonio, Texas, where he was to remain until another country agreed to admit him for medical treatment. He hoped to return to Mexico, particularly Cuernavaca, of which he had fond memories, but the Mexican government refused to admit him.

Despite calls for the Shah to receive permanent asylum in the United States, including from Ronald Reagan, it was announced on 15 December that he would depart for Panama. Reflecting on the Shah's turbulent stay in United States, political economist Marvin Zonis observed that he had been "in effect, expelled" from the country. In his 1980 memoir, Answer to History, the Shah claimed that the United States had failed to provide him with adequate medical care and had pressured him to leave.

=== Time in Panama ===
The Shah's arrival in Contadora Island, Panama on 15 December 1979 was met with protests from Panamanians opposed to his presence in the country. General Omar Torrijos, Panama's military ruler, effectively confined the Shah to the Paitilla Medical Center, which his American physicians condemned as "an inadequate and poorly staffed hospital", where only Panamanian doctors were permitted to treat his cancer. Torrijos, a left-wing populist who admitted the Shah under considerable U.S. pressure, openly expressed his dislike for the former monarch, describing him as "the saddest man he had ever met". During their first meeting, Torrijos reportedly remarked that "it must be hard to fall off the Peacock Throne into Contadora" and called him a chupon, a Spanish slang term for someone who was finished. The Shah was charged a monthly rent of $21,000, and required to cover his food expenses and the wages of the 200 National Guardsmen assigned to protect him. His chief bodyguard, appointed by Torrijos, was a Marxist sociology professor who reportedly lectured him about his role as a "tool" of American imperialism.

In January 1980, the Shah gave his final television interview to British journalist David Frost at his Contadora Island residence. The interview, in which he discussed his life in exile and reflected on his actions during the Iranian Revolution, was rebroadcast in the United States by ABC on 17 January. During this time, he also began exchanging letters with his former wife, Princess Soraya, who wrote from Paris expressed her continuing affection and her desire to see him before his death. The Shah reciprocated her wishes but insisted that Shahbanou Farah not be present, complicating a possible reunion.

Soon after his arrival, an Iranian representative delivered a 450-page extradition request to the Panamanian government, alarming the Shah and his advisers. During a meeting with White House Chief of Staff Hamilton Jordan, Khomeini advisor Sadegh Ghotbzadeh reportedly requested that the CIA assassinate the Shah in Panama. Fearing for his life, the Shah left Panama for Cairo, Egypt, in March 1980, postponing further surgery.

=== Asylum in Egypt and splenectomy ===
Upon the Shah's return to Egypt, President Sadat renewed his offer of permanent asylum to the ailing monarch and arranged for urgent medical treatment. Cardiovascular surgeon Michael DeBakey was called to perform a splenectomy, an operation that had been postponed since the autumn of 1979. Although internationally renowned in his field, DeBakey had limited experience performing the procedure. The operation was successfully carried out on 28 March 1980 by a team of American, French and Egyptian physicians, but an injury to the tail of the pancreas resulted in an infection. Ben Kean later recalled:

The operation went beautifully. That night, however, was terrible. The medical team—U.S., Egyptian, French—was in the pathology lab. The focus was on the Shah's cancerous spleen, grotesquely swollen to 20 times normal. It was one-foot long, literally the size of a football. But I was drawn to the liver tissues that had also been removed. The liver was speckled with white. Malignancy. The cancer had hit the liver. The Shah would soon die... The tragedy is that a man who should have had the best and easiest medical care had, in many respects, the worst.

Sadat later arranged for Princess Soraya to visit the Shah privately in Egypt, without Shahbanou Farah present. However, Soraya was unable to travel from Paris in time to see him before his death.

== Death and state funeral ==
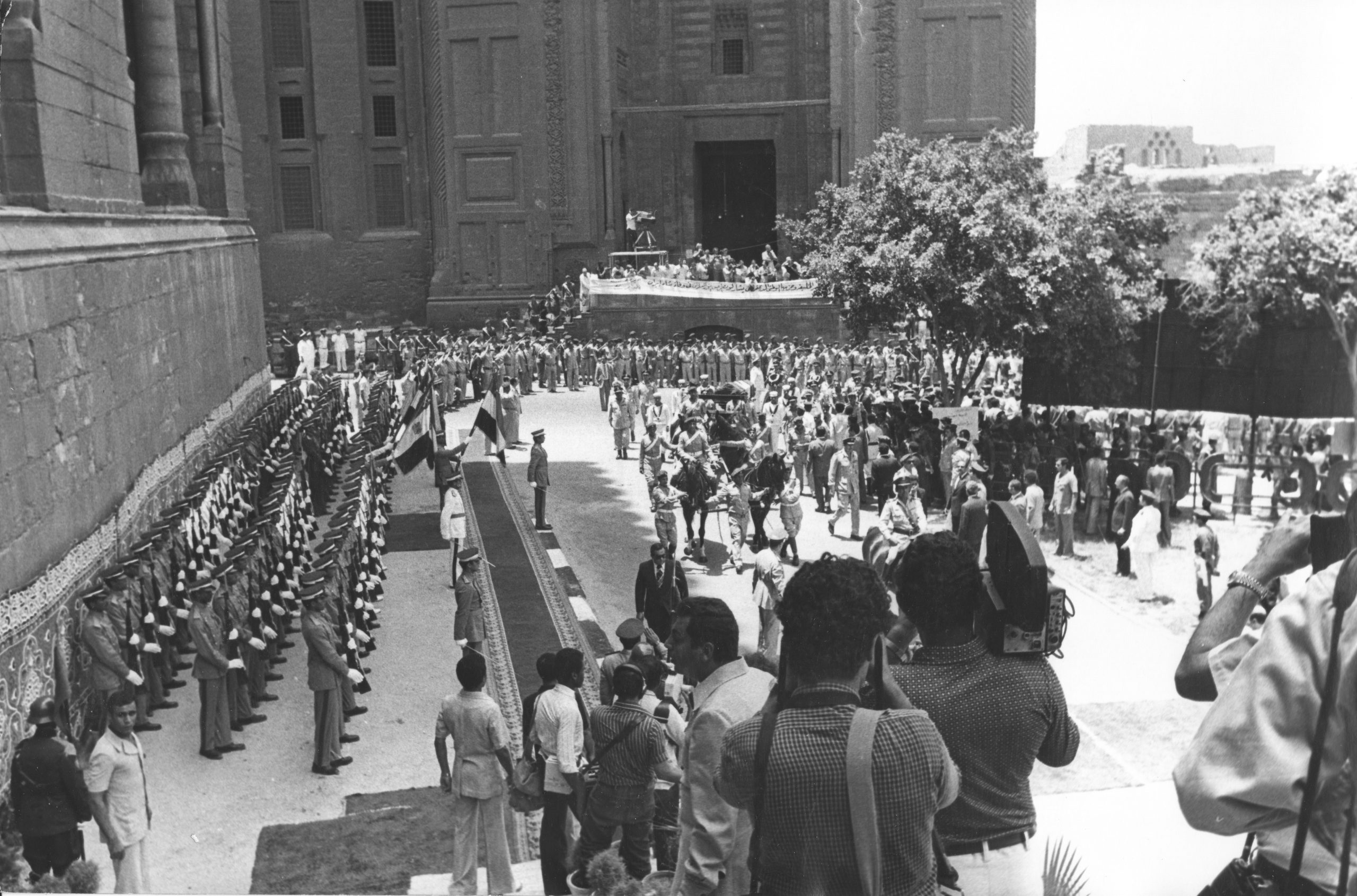
The funeral procession of Mohammad Reza Pahlavi at Al-Rifa'i Mosque, 30 July 1980

The infection resulting from the splenectomy contributed to the Shah's final decline in health. During his final days, he was asked to describe his feelings for Iran and its people. He responded, "Iran is Iran." After a lengthy pause, he added, "Its land, people, and history," and "Every Iranian has to love it", before repeatedly saying, "Iran is Iran". Shortly afterward, he slipped into a coma and died at 9:15 a.m. on 27 July 1980, aged 60. He reportedly kept a bag of Iranian soil beneath his death bed.

Sadat accorded the Shah a state funeral in Cairo, attended by members of the Pahlavi family, Richard Nixon, and former King Constantine II of Greece. He was entombed at the Al Rifa'i Mosque, alongside other members of Egypt's former royal family, including Farouk, his former brother-in-law. His father and predecessor, Reza Shah, had also initially been buried at the mosque.

== Criticism of reign and causes of his overthrow ==
=== Change of Calendar ===
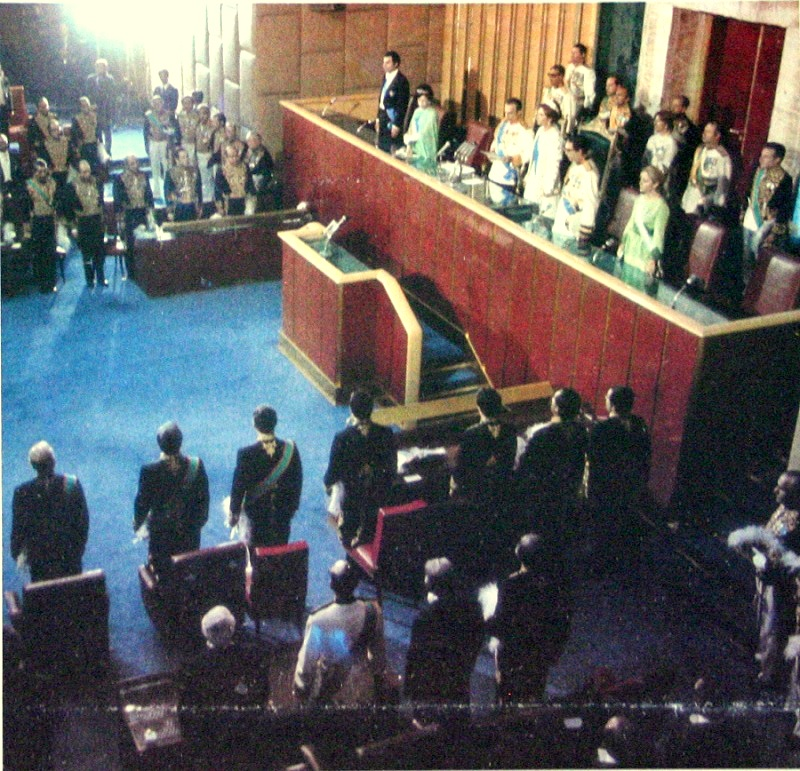
The Shah addressing the Iranian Senate, 1975

In October 1971, Mohammad Reza celebrated the twenty-five-hundredth anniversary of the Iranian monarchy; The New York Times reported that $100 million was spent on the celebration. Next to the ancient ruins of Persepolis, the Shah gave orders to build a tent city covering 160 acres (0.65 km^{2}), studded with three huge royal tents and 59 lesser ones arranged in a star-shaped design. French chefs from Maxim's of Paris prepared breast of peacock for royalty and dignitaries from around the world, the buildings were decorated by Maison Jansen (the same firm that helped Jacqueline Kennedy redecorate the White House), the guests ate off Limoges porcelain and drank from Baccarat crystal glasses. This became a major scandal, as the contrast between the dazzling elegance of the celebration and the misery of the nearby villages was so dramatic that no one could ignore it. Months before the festivities, university students went on strike in protest. Indeed, the cost was so sufficiently impressive that the Shah forbade his associates to discuss the actual figures. However, he and his supporters argued that the celebrations opened new investments in Iran, improved relationships with the other leaders and nations of the world and provided greater recognition of Iran.

Other actions thought to have contributed to his downfall include antagonising formerly apolitical Iranians—especially merchants of the bazaars—with the creation in 1975 of a single-party political monopoly (the Rastakhiz Party), with compulsory membership and dues, and general aggressive interference in the political, economic, and religious concerns of people's lives; and the 1976 change from an Islamic calendar to an Imperial calendar, marking the conquest of Babylon by Cyrus as the first day, instead of the migration of Muhammad from Mecca to Medina. This supposed date was designed so that the year 2500 would fall on 1941, the year when his own reign started. Overnight, the year changed from 1355 to 2535. During the extravagant festivities to celebrate the 2,500th anniversary, the Shah was quoted as saying at Cyrus's tomb: "Rest in peace, Cyrus, for we are awake".

It has been argued that the White Revolution was "shoddily planned and haphazardly carried out", upsetting the wealthy while not going far enough to provide for the poor or offer greater political freedom. In 1974, Mohammad Reza learned from his French doctors that he was suffering from the cancer that was to kill him six years later. Though this was such a carefully guarded secret that not even the Americans were aware of it (as late as 1977, the CIA submitted a report to President Carter describing the Shah as being in "robust health"), the knowledge of his impending death left Mohammad Reza depressed and passive in his last years, a man no longer capable of acting.

=== Unemployment ===
Some achievements of the Shah—such as broadened education—had unintended consequences. While school attendance rose (by 1966, the school attendance of urban seven- to 14-year-olds was estimated at 75.8 percent), Iran's labour market was slow to absorb the high number of educated youth. In 1966, high school graduates had "a higher rate of unemployment than did the illiterate", and the educated unemployed often supported the revolution.

=== Human rights violations ===
Pahlavi's government has been described by critics as an "oppressive police state". The state's secret police, SAVAK, carried out large-scale torture against thousands of political prisoners. Methods included "not only electric shock and beatings, but also the insertion of bottles in the rectum, hanging weights from testicles, rape, and such apparatus as a helmet that, worn over the head of the victim, magnifies his own screams." Such methods were used against many intellectuals, artists, writers, and other perceived dissidents. Pahlavi has been described as "autocratic" and "deeply unpopular".

== Legacy ==
In 1969, Mohammad Reza sent one of 73 Apollo 11 Goodwill Messages to NASA for the historic first lunar landing. The message still rests on the lunar surface today. He stated in part, "we pray the Almighty God to guide mankind towards ever increasing success in the establishment of culture, knowledge and human civilisation". The Apollo 11 crew visited Mohammad Reza during a world tour.

Shortly after his overthrow, Mohammad Reza wrote an autobiographical memoir Réponse à l'histoire (Answer to History). It was translated from the original French into English, Persian (as Pasokh be Tarikh), and other languages. However, he had already died by the time of its publication. The book is Mohammad Reza's personal account of his reign and accomplishments, as well as his perspective on issues related to the Iranian Revolution and Western foreign policy toward Iran. He places some of the blame for the wrongdoings of SAVAK, and the failures of various democratic and social reforms (particularly through the White Revolution), upon Amir Abbas Hoveyda and his administration.

After his overthrow, his son Reza Pahlavi declared himself the new Shah of Iran in exile. Recently, Mohammad Reza's reputation has experienced something of a revival in Iran, with some people looking back on his era as a time when Iran was more prosperous and the government less oppressive. Journalist Afshin Molavi reported that some members of the uneducated poor—traditionally core supporters of the revolution that overthrew the monarchy—were making remarks such as, "God bless the Shah's soul, the economy was better then", and found that "books about the former Shah (even censored ones) sell briskly", while "books of the Rightly Guided Path sit idle". On 28 October 2016, thousands of people in Iran celebrating Cyrus Day at the Tomb of Cyrus, chanted slogans in support of him, and against the current Islamic regime of Iran and Arabs, and many were subsequently arrested.

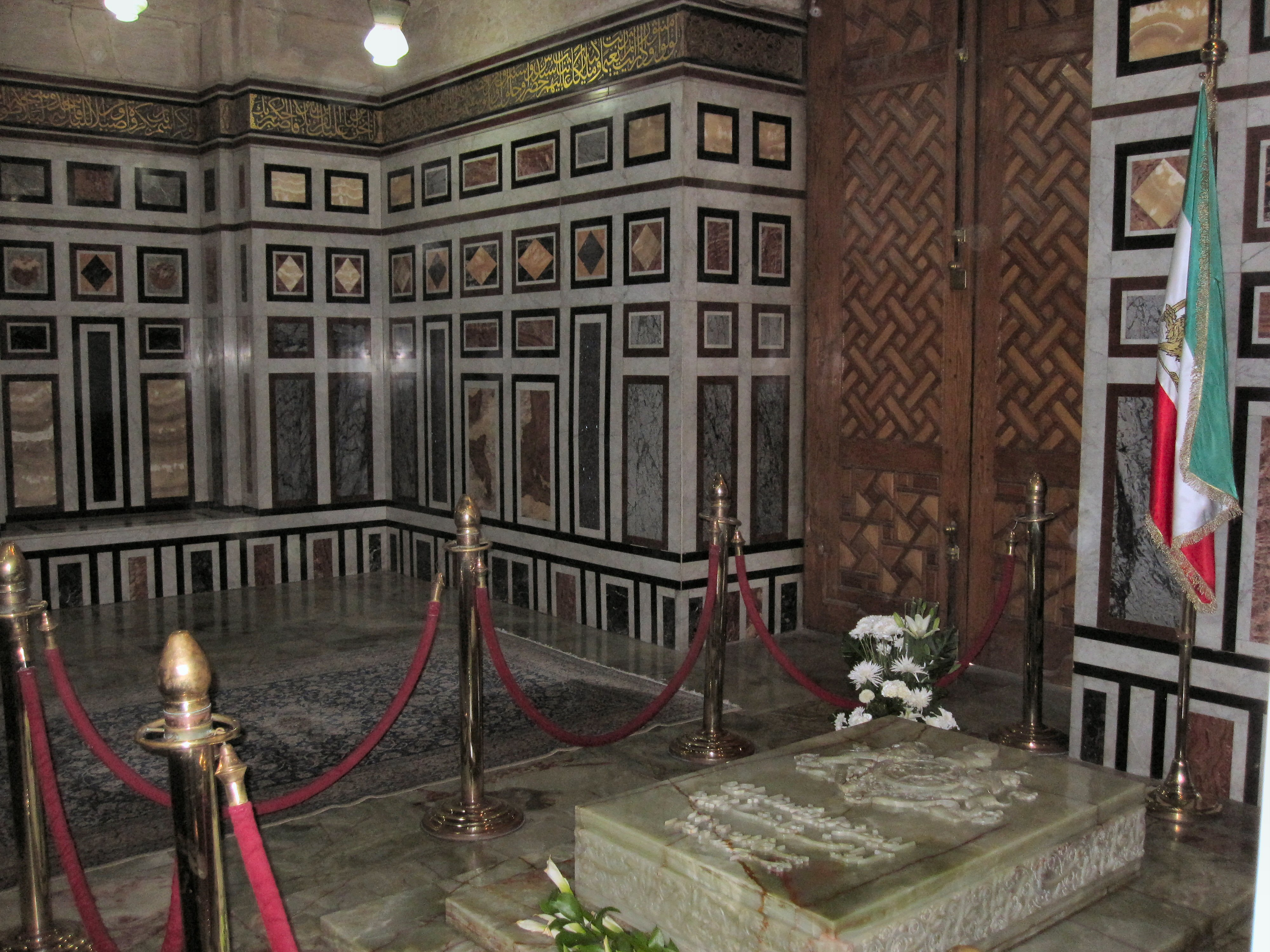
The interior of Mohammad Reza's tomb in Cairo's Al Rifa'i Mosque

== Personal life ==
=== Wives and children ===
Name	Birth	Death	Notes
By Fawzia of Egypt (married 15 March 1939; divorced 17 November 1948)
Shahnaz Pahlavi	27 October 1940	—	married twice; has issue
By Soraya Esfandiary-Bakhtiary (married 12 March 1951; divorced 15 March 1958)
No issue
By Farah Diba (married 21 December 1959)
Reza Pahlavi	31 October 1960	—	married Yasmine Etemad-Amini in 1986; has issue
Farahnaz Pahlavi	12 March 1963	—	not married; no issue
Ali Reza Pahlavi	28 April 1966	4 January 2011	engaged to Raha Didevar in 2010; had issue
Leila Pahlavi	27 March 1970	10 June 2001	never married; no issue

=== Religious beliefs ===
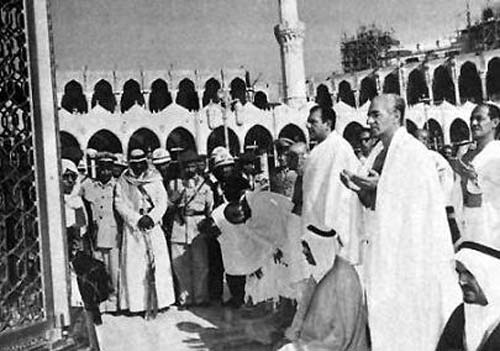
Mohammad Reza during his Hajj pilgrimage in the 1970s

From his mother, Mohammad Reza inherited an almost messianic belief in his own greatness and that God was working in his favour, which explained the often passive and fatalistic attitudes that he displayed as an adult. In 1973, Mohammad Reza told the Italian journalist Oriana Fallaci:

A king who does not need to account to anyone for what he says and does is unavoidably doomed to loneliness. However, I am not entirely alone, because a force others can't perceive accompanies me. My mystical force. Moreover, I receive messages. I have lived with God besides me since I was 5 years old. Since, that is, God sent me those visions.

Mohammad Reza often spoke in public and in private from childhood onward of his belief that God had chosen him for a "divine mission" to transform Iran, as he believed that dreams he had as a child of the Twelve Imams of Shia Islam were all messages from God. In his 1961 book Mission for My Country, Mohammad Reza wrote:

From the time I was six or seven, I have felt that perhaps there is a supreme being, who is guiding me. I don't know. Sometimes the thought disturbs me because then, I ask myself, what is my own personality, and am I possessed of free will? Still, I often reflect, if I am driven-or perhaps I should say supported-by another force, there must be a reason.

In his biography of the Shah, Marvin Zonis argued that Mohammad Reza really believed in these claims of divine support. Shia Islam has no tradition of describing Shahs being favoured with messages from Allah; very few Shahs had ever claimed that their dreams were divine messages, and most people in the West laughed at Mohammad Reza's claim that his dreams were messages from God. Reza Shah, Mohammad Reza's father, who was less religious, dismissed these visions as nonsense, and told his son to have more common sense.

Fereydoon Hoveyda, a veteran diplomat who served as the Iranian ambassador to the United Nations (1971–1979), and the brother of Amir-Abbas Hoveyda, the Prime Minister under the Shah (1965–1977) executed after the Islamic revolution, and himself a critic of the régime who died in exile, says that "when it comes to religion and spirituality, many passages of the monarch's and Khomeini's publications are interchangeable", which he perceives as the continuity of the Iranian civilization, where the religion changes but the spirit remains.

=== Wealth ===
Mohammad Reza inherited the wealth built by his father Reza Shah, who preceded him as king of Iran and became known as the richest person in Iran during his reign, with his wealth estimated to be higher than 600 million rials and including vast amounts of land and numerous large estates especially in the province of Mazandaran obtained usually at a fraction of their real price. Reza Shah, facing criticism for his wealth, decided to pass on all of his land and wealth to his eldest son Mohammad Reza in exchange for a sugar cube, known in Iran as habbe kardan. However, shortly after obtaining the wealth Mohammad Reza was ordered by his father and then king to transfer a million toman ($500,000) to each of his siblings. By 1958, it was estimated that the companies possessed by Mohammad Reza had a value of $157 million (in 1958 USD) with an estimated additional $100 million saved outside Iran. Rumours of his and his family's corruption began to surface which greatly damaged his reputation. This formed one of the reasons for the creation of the Pahlavi Foundation and the distribution of additional land to the people of some 2,000 villages inherited by his father, often at very low and discounted prices. In 1958, using funds from inherited crown estates, Mohammad Reza established the Pahlavi Foundation, which functioned as a tax-exempt charity and held all his assets, including 830 villages spanning a total area of 2.5 million hectares (6.2 million acres). According to Business Insider, Mohammad Reza had set up the organisation "to pursue Iran's charitable interests in the U.S." At its height, the organisation was estimated to be worth $3 billion; however, on numerous occasions, the Pahlavi Foundation was accused of corruption. Despite these charges, in his book Answer to History Pahlavi affirms that he "never made the slightest profit" out of the Foundation.

In a 1974 interview which was shown in a documentary titled Crisis in Iran, Mohammad Reza told Mike Wallace that the rumours of corruption were "the most unjust thing that I have heard," calling them a "cheap accusation" whilst arguing the allegations were not as serious as those regarding other governments, including that of the United States. In November 1978, after Pahlavi dismissed Prime Minister Jafar Sharif-Emami and appointed a military government, he pledged in a televised address "not to repeat the past mistakes and illegalities, the cruelty and corruption." Despite this, the royal family's wealth can be seen as one of the factors behind the Iranian revolution. This was due to the oil crises of the 1970s which increased inflation resulting in economic austerity measures which made lower class workers more inclined to protest.

Mohammad Reza's wealth remained considerable during his time in exile. While staying in the Bahamas he offered to purchase the island that he was staying on for $425 million (in 1979 USD); however, his offer was rejected by the Bahamas which claimed that the island was worth far more. On 17 October 1979, again in exile and perhaps knowing the gravity of his illness, he split up his wealth amongst his family members, giving 20% to Farah, 20% to his eldest son Reza, 15% to Farahnaz, 15% to Leila, 20% to his younger son, in addition to giving 8% to Shahnaz and 2% to his granddaughter Mahnaz Zahedi.

On 14 January 1979, an article titled "Little pain expected in exile for Shah" by The Spokesman Review newspaper found that the Pahlavi dynasty had amassed one of the largest private fortunes in the world; estimated then at well over $1 billion. It also stated that a document submitted to the ministry of justice, in protest of the royal family's activity in many sectors of the nation's economy, detailed the Pahlavis dominating role in the economy of Iran. The list showed that the Pahlavi dynasty had interests in, amongst other things, 17 banks and insurance companies, including a 90 percent ownership in the nation's third-largest insurance company, 25 metal enterprises, 8 mining companies, 10 building-materials companies, including 25 per cent of the largest cement company, 45 construction companies, 43 food companies, and 26 enterprises in trade or commerce, including a share of ownership in almost every major hotel in Iran; the Pahlavis also had major interests in real estate. Mohammad Reza was also known for his interest in cars and had a personal collection of 140 classic and sports cars including a Mercedes-Benz 500K Autobahn cruiser, one of only six ever made. The first Maserati 5000 GT was named the Shah of Persia, and was built for Mohammad Reza, who had been impressed by the Maserati 3500 and requested Giulio Alfieri, Maserati's chief engineer, to use a modified 5-litre engine from the Maserati 450S on the 3500GT's chassis. There was also a 2019 car named in his honour.

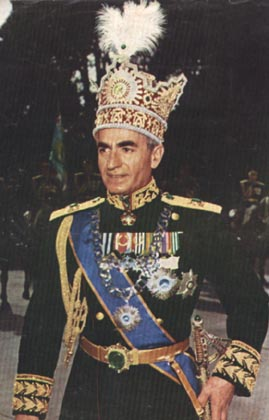
The newly crowned Shah with his Pahlavi Crown

The Shah of Persia, body by Carrozzeria Touring

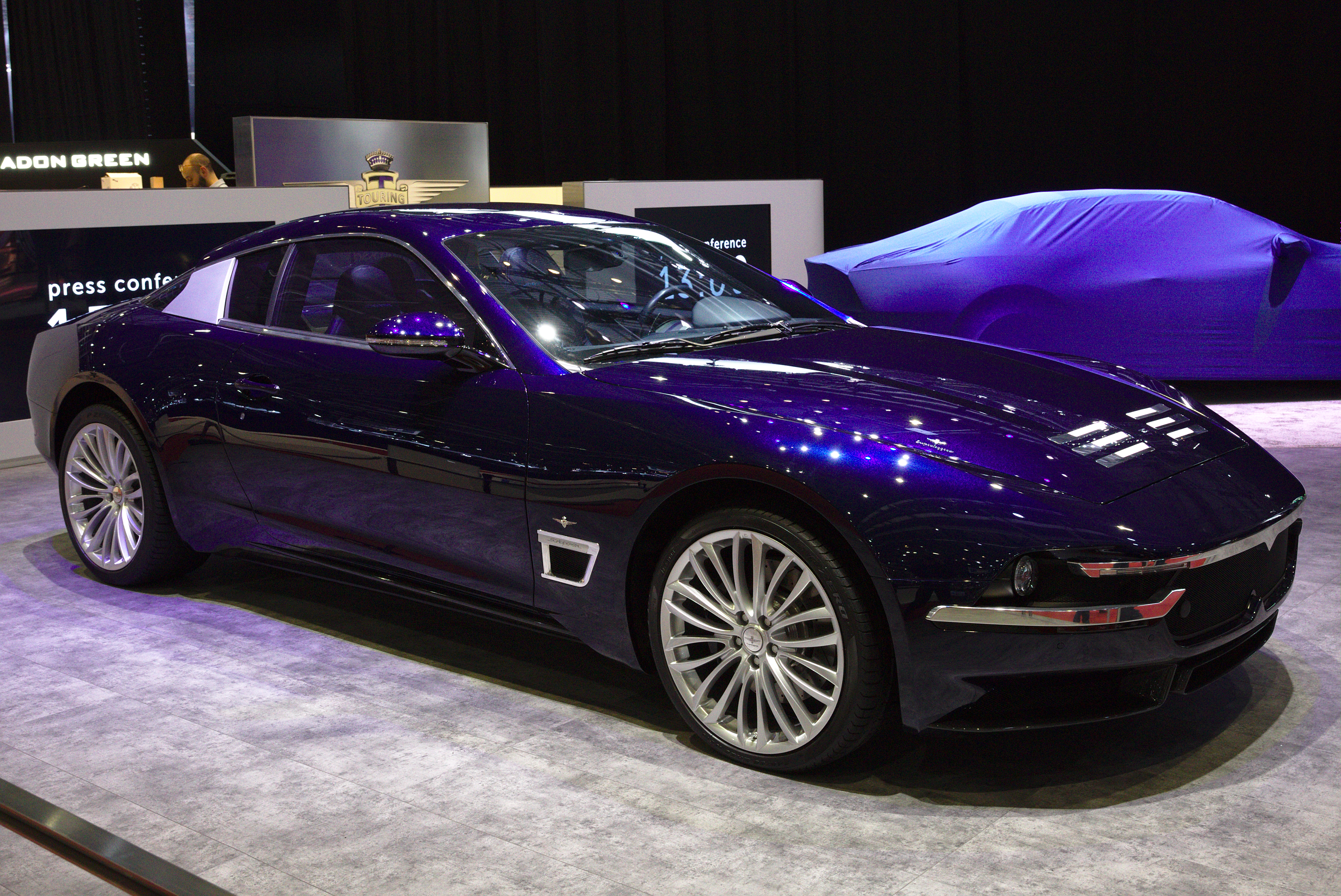
Touring Superleggera Scià Di Persia

== Titles, styles, honours, and emblems ==
=== Titles, styles, and honours ===
Styles of Mohammad Reza Shah of Iran
- Reference style: His Imperial Majesty
- Spoken style: Your Imperial Majesty
- Alternative style: Aryamehr

Mohammad Reza was Sovereign of many orders in Iran and received honours and decorations from around the world. Mohammad Reza used the style His Majesty until his imperial coronation in 1967, ascending to the title of Shahanshah, when he adopted the style His Imperial Majesty. Mohammad Reza also held many supplementary titles such as Bozorg Artestaran, a military rank superseding his prior position as captain. On 15 September 1965, Mohammad Reza was granted the title of Aryamehr ('The Light of the Aryans') by an extraordinary session of the joint Houses of Parliament.

=== Coats of arms ===
From 24 April 1926, until his accession, Mohammad Reza's arms notably consisted of two Shahbaz birds in the centre, a common symbol during the Achaemenid period, with the Pahlavi Crown placed above them. Upon his accession, he adopted his father's coat of arms which included a shield composed of the Lion and the Sun symbol in first quarter, the Faravahar in the second quarter, the two-pointed sword of Ali (Zulfiqar) in third quarter and the Simurgh in the fourth quarter. Overall, in the centre is a circle depicting Mount Damavand with a rising sun, the symbol of the Pahlavi dynasty. The shield is crowned by the Pahlavi crown and surrounded by the chain of the Order of Pahlavi. Two lions rampant regardant, holding scimitars supports the coat of arms on either side. Under the whole device is the motto: "Mara dad farmud va Khod Davar Ast" ('Justice He bids me do, as He will judge me' or, alternatively, 'He gave me power to command, and He is the judge').

Coat of arms of Crown Prince Mohammad Reza
(1926–1941)

Coat of arms of Mohammad Reza Shah
(1941–1980)

== Books ==
Mohammad Reza published several books in the course of his kingship and two later works after his downfall. Amongst others, these include:

- Mission for My Country (1960)
- The White Revolution (1967)
- Toward the Great Civilisation (Persian version: Imperial 2536 = 1977 CE; English version: 1994)
- Answer to History (1980)
- The Shah's Story (1980)

== See also ==
- 1953 Iran coup
- 1979 Iranian Revolution, also known as Islamic Revolution and 1979 Revolution
- 2,500-year celebration of the Persian Empire, a luxurious and extravagant celebration at Persepolis in 1971
- Answer to History, 1980 memoir by Mohammad Reza Pahlavi
- Conspiracy theories about the Iranian Revolution
- Farah Pahlavi, wife of Mohammad Reza Pahlavi
- Guadeloupe Conference
- History of Iran
- Human rights in Pahlavi Iran
- Mediterranean and Middle East theatre of World War II
- Monarchism in Iran
- National Car Museum of Iran, showcases the cars of Mohammad Reza Pahlavi
- Nuclear program of Iran
- Pahlavi Iran
- "The Shah Is Gone", iconic headline of the Iranian newspaper Ettela'at when the Shah left Iran
- Timeline of the Iranian revolution
- Trans-Iranian Railway
- White Revolution

== Notes ==
Mohammad Reza Shah House of Pahlavi Born: 26 October 1919 Died: 27 July 1980
Regnal titles
Preceded by Reza Shah	Shah of Iran; 16 September 1941 – 11 February 1979	Vacant Iranian Revolution
Titles in pretence
Preceded by Reza Shah	— TITULAR — Shah of Iran; 11 February 1979 – 27 July 1980; Reason for succession failure: Iranian Revolution	Succeeded by Reza
Military offices
Preceded by Reza Shah	Commander-in-Chief of the Iranian Armed Forces; 1941–1952	Succeeded by Mohammad Mosaddegh
Preceded by Mohammad Mosaddegh	Commander-in-Chief of the Iranian Armed Forces; 1953–1979	Vacant Title next held by Abolhassan Banisadr
Non-profit organization positions
Preceded by Reza Shah	Chairman of the Iranian Red Lion and Sun Society; 1941–1949	Succeeded by Shams Pahlavi
