= An Enduring Love =

2004 book by Farah Pahlavi

An Enduring Love: My Life with the Shah
- Author: Farah Pahlavi
- Publisher: Miramax
- Publication date: 2004
- Publication place: United States
- ISBN: 978-1-4013-5961-4

An Enduring Love: My Life with the Shah is a book written in 2004 by Farah Pahlavi, the former Shahbanu (Empress) of Iran, who has been living in exile since the 1979 Iranian Revolution overthrew the Pahlavi Dynasty. It is a memoir about Farah, her life before she met the Shah and how she married him, thus becoming the Queen and later Empress of Iran. The book is also about her husband, Mohammad Reza Shah Pahlavi, his personality, his family and how he reigned over Iran for 37 years.

According to an interview published in The New York Times, Farah Pahlavi talked about her wedding in detail in the book. She wrote that Carita sisters created a hairstyle and Harry Winston designed a tiara for her. In addition, the Shahbanu comprehensively described Mohammad Reza Shah's illness in exile, letters written by doctors, and the death of her daughter, Princess Leila Pahlavi. The memoir was translated into Azerbaijani by writer Nariman Abdulrahmanli.

== See also ==
- History of Iran
