= Behkadeh Raji =

Leprosy hospital in Iran

Coordinates: 36°50′N 54°29′E

Behkadeh Raji (Persian: بهکده راجی) is the first leper colony to be built as an economically self-sufficient, independent village. It was built in 1961 on the initiative of Farah Pahlavi in Iran. The aim of the village concept was to not only achieve optimal care of lepers by the coexistence of healthy and diseased, but also to cultivate dialog and the exchange of information with the public about leprosy sufferers.

== History ==
Farah Pahlavi was still at school when she learned about the suffering of those afflicted with leprosy in Iran as part of a learned lecture held at their high school. Shortly after her marriage to Shah Mohammad Reza Pahlavi she took over as one of her first official duties (at the request of former Health Minister Abdol-Hossein Raji) chairman of the Leprosy Relief and Works Agency in Iran and Ozra Moshiri Ziai, undersecretary of housing and urban development.

The situation of leprosy patients in Iran was more than desolate. The few stations were mostly led by Christian priests and nuns. From around the country lepers made pilgrimages to the mosque of Imam Reza in Mashhad, to pray for their recovery. The mosque was considered one of the most important pilgrimage centers, and offered the patient the opportunity to secure their living by begging. The administration of Mashhad however wanted to get rid of the patients.

They built, 3 km from Mashhad a hospital for lepers, the leprosarium Asayeshgah Mehrab Khans. In the leper colony 900 leprosy patients were housed. In addition, 180 healthy children of leprous mothers lived in the colony without any school supplies. The main building had been equipped with modern devices to faucets with sensors, the supply still fell short of international standards.

First all lepers of the land were counted and brought to the expanded leprosarium to Mashhad, or, if that was not possible, brought to local hospitals for inpatient treatment. As part of a scientific field study the regional distribution of leprosy has been studied and the state of medical care. It turned out that both the population and most physicians were not well informed about the disease.

The recommendation of the World Health Organization WHO, to treat the lepers in their own villages in order to avoid social exclusion of the patients was not possible because the villagers feared of contamination. This ultimately led to the idea of building for the patients own village, which - should, where feasible - economically self-care to enable patients to lead an independent life.

== Design and operation ==
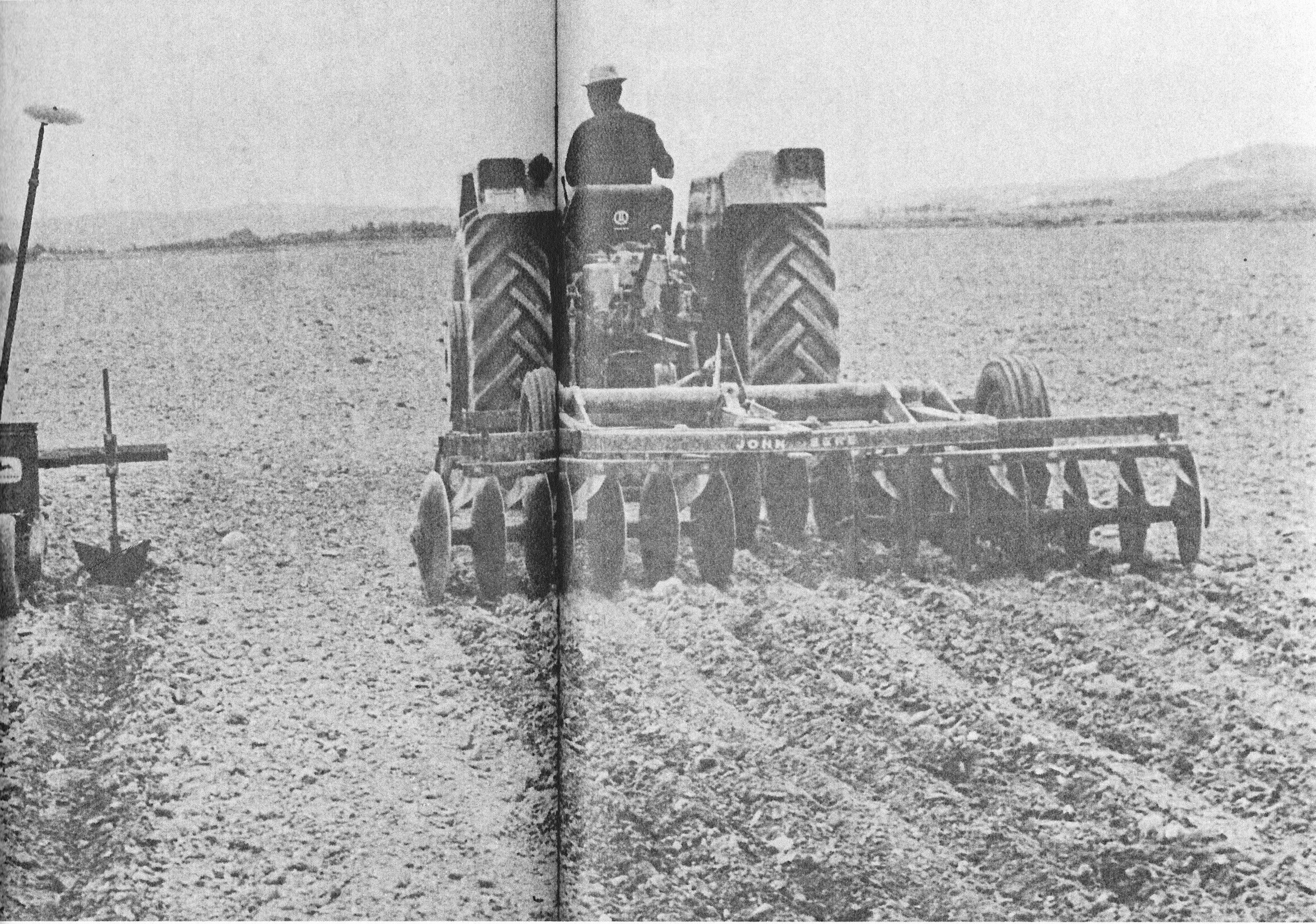
Farm in Behkadeh Raji

Shah Mohammad Reza Pahlavi overwrote the Iranian Leprosy Relief from his private lands (30,000 hectares) in Bojnurd, 450 km northeast of Tehran. There was then the village of Deh kadeh with over three hundred buildings, including hospitals, primary schools, cinema, police station, restaurant, a public bath, cottage industry, agricultural equipment, vegetable gardens, gas station, car repair shop, a knitting stockings and socks, etc. built. The medical equipment of the hospital by Behkadeh Raji was funded by a donation from the Deutschen Aussätzigen-Hilfswerk.

As a basis for economic self-sufficiency each resident received 30 sheep. A sheep breeder gave courses in the sheep. The community had its own pasture land of 24 hectares. Medical care was taken over by Iranian doctors. In addition, volunteer doctors from Pakistan, India, France and Switzerland, arrived in Deh kadeh to using plastic surgery to disfigured faces, hands and legs of the patient to establish the extent possible.

As agricultural production exceeds the healed lepers from Behkadeh Raji own use, the surpluses, such as Potatoes and cotton in the markets of the area were sold.

== Literature ==
- Mansureh Pirnia: Safar Nameh Shahbanu. Entesharat Mehr Iran, 1371, S. 250.
- Veröffentlichung des Büros Ihrer Hoheit (Farah Pahlavi), 1354 (1975).
