= Ali Reza Pahlavi (born 1966) =

Iranian prince (1966–2011)

- Prince
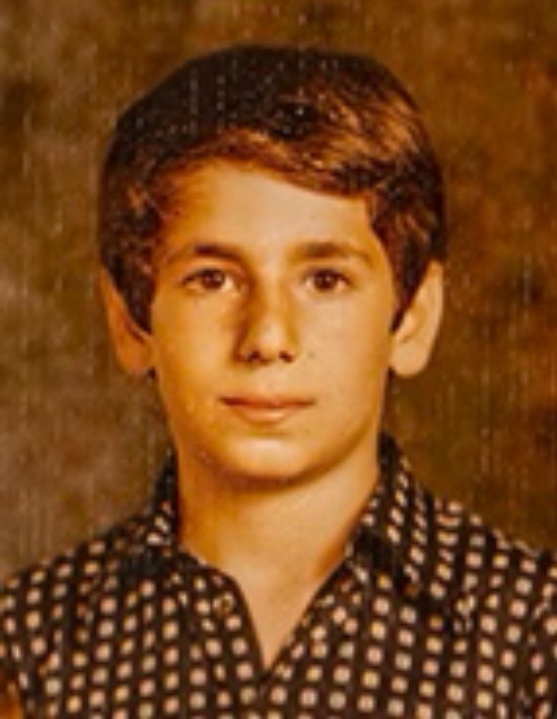
- Ali Reza in 1976
- Born: 28 April 1966; Tehran, Imperial State of Iran
- Died: 4 January 2011 (aged 44); Boston, Massachusetts, U.S.
- Cause of death: Suicide
- Issue: Iryana Leila Pahlavi
- House: Pahlavi
- Father: Mohammad Reza Pahlavi
- Mother: Farah Diba

Ali Reza Pahlavi (Persian: علیرضا پهلوی; 28 April 1966 – 4 January 2011) was the heir presumptive to the headship of the deposed Pahlavi dynasty from 1980 until his death in 2011. He was the younger son of Mohammad Reza Pahlavi, the former Shah of Iran and his third wife Farah Diba. He was second in order of succession to the Iranian throne before the 1979 Islamic Revolution.

He left Iran alongside his family shortly before the Revolution. He moved to the United States, where he ultimately received a BA degree from Princeton University, an MA degree from Columbia University, and was studying at Harvard University as a PhD student in ancient Iranian studies and philology at the time of his death.

On 4 January 2011, he committed suicide after battling with depression.

== Biography ==
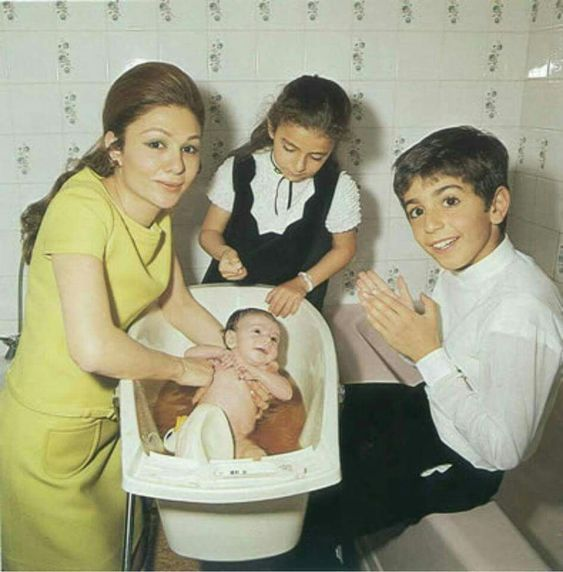
The Iranian royal family on Alireza Pahlavi's birthday, 1966.

Ali Reza Pahlavi was born on 28 April 1966, to Mohammad Reza Pahlavi, the Shah of Iran, and his third wife Farah Diba. He was the heir presumptive to the headship of the deposed Pahlavi dynasty from 1980 until his death in 2011. He was second in order of succession to the Iranian throne before the 1979 Islamic Revolution.

He attended the Niavaran Palace primary school in Iran.

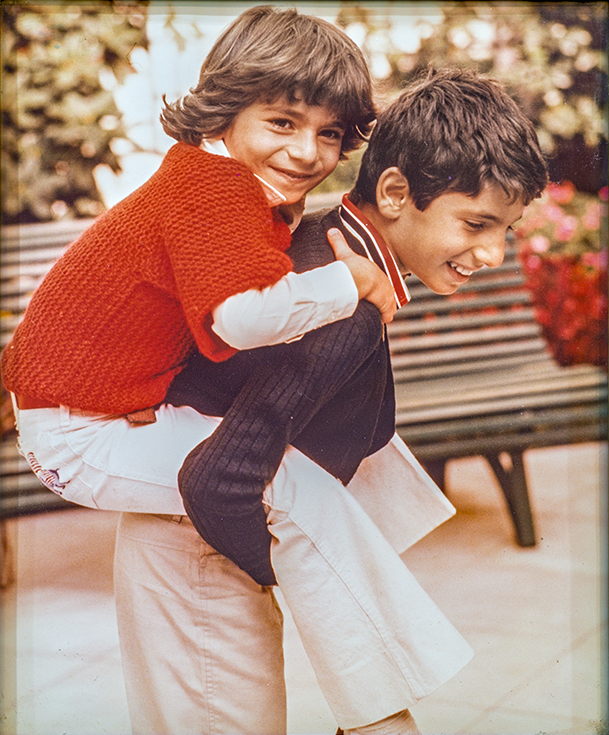
Ali Reza (right) with his younger sister Leila (left) at Niavaran Palace, taken prior to 1979.

He left Iran and entered exile alongside his family shortly before the 1979 Islamic Revolution. He moved to the United States, where he attended Saint David's School in Manhattan in New York City, and Mount Greylock Regional High School in Williamstown, Massachusetts. Pahlavi received a BA degree from Princeton University where he studied music and ethnomusicology, an MA degree from Columbia University, and was studying at Harvard University as a PhD student in ancient Iranian studies and philology at the time of his death.

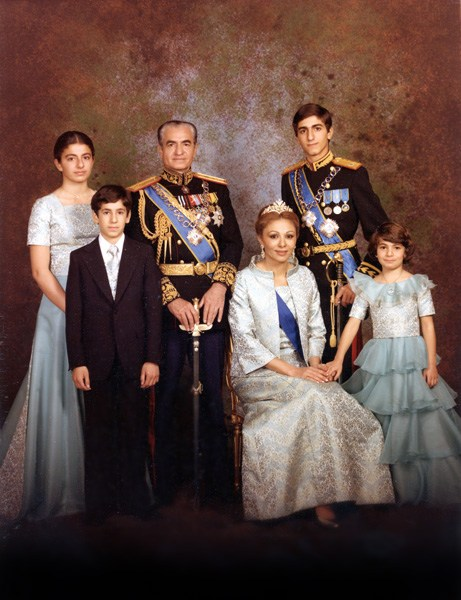
Official family portrait, with Ali Reza second from the left, 1978.

In 2001, he was engaged to Sarah Tabatabai but the relationship seems to have ended some time afterwards. He made a rare public appearance in 2005 at the funeral of Prince Rainier III of Monaco in Monte Carlo, alongside his mother Farah Diba.

Prince Alireza is survived by his daughter Iryana Leila Pahlavi, born posthumously in Boston on July 26th 2011. He was once voted one of the "world's most eligible princes."

== Death ==
On 4 January 2011, after a long period of depression and at 44 years of age, Pahlavi died in his apartment in the South End, Boston (141 West Newton Street) from a self-inflicted gunshot wound to the head.

Mahnaz Afkhami, the former Iranian Minister of Women's Affairs of the Shah's government, told the BBC World Service that Pahlavi and his family being forced into exile in 1979 was very "traumatic" for Ali Reza. He said that Ali Reza had experienced a "loss of identity" in exile.

In June 2001, Ali Reza's younger sister, Leila Pahlavi, had also committed suicide. Close family friends say that Ali Reza became very depressed after the death of his sister, to whom he was very close.

Ali Reza was survived by his mother, Farah Pahlavi, his older brother Reza, his sister Farahnaz, half-sister Shahnaz, daughter, and partner. On 23 January 2011, an official memorial was held in The Music Center at Strathmore in Bethesda, Maryland. The memorial was attended by the former Iranian imperial family and thousands of Iranians.

His brother Reza Pahlavi said that Ali Reza's wish had been to be cremated, and for his ashes to be scattered in the Caspian Sea.
