= Farah Pahlavi =

Queen/Empress of Iran from 1959 to 1979

- Shahbanu
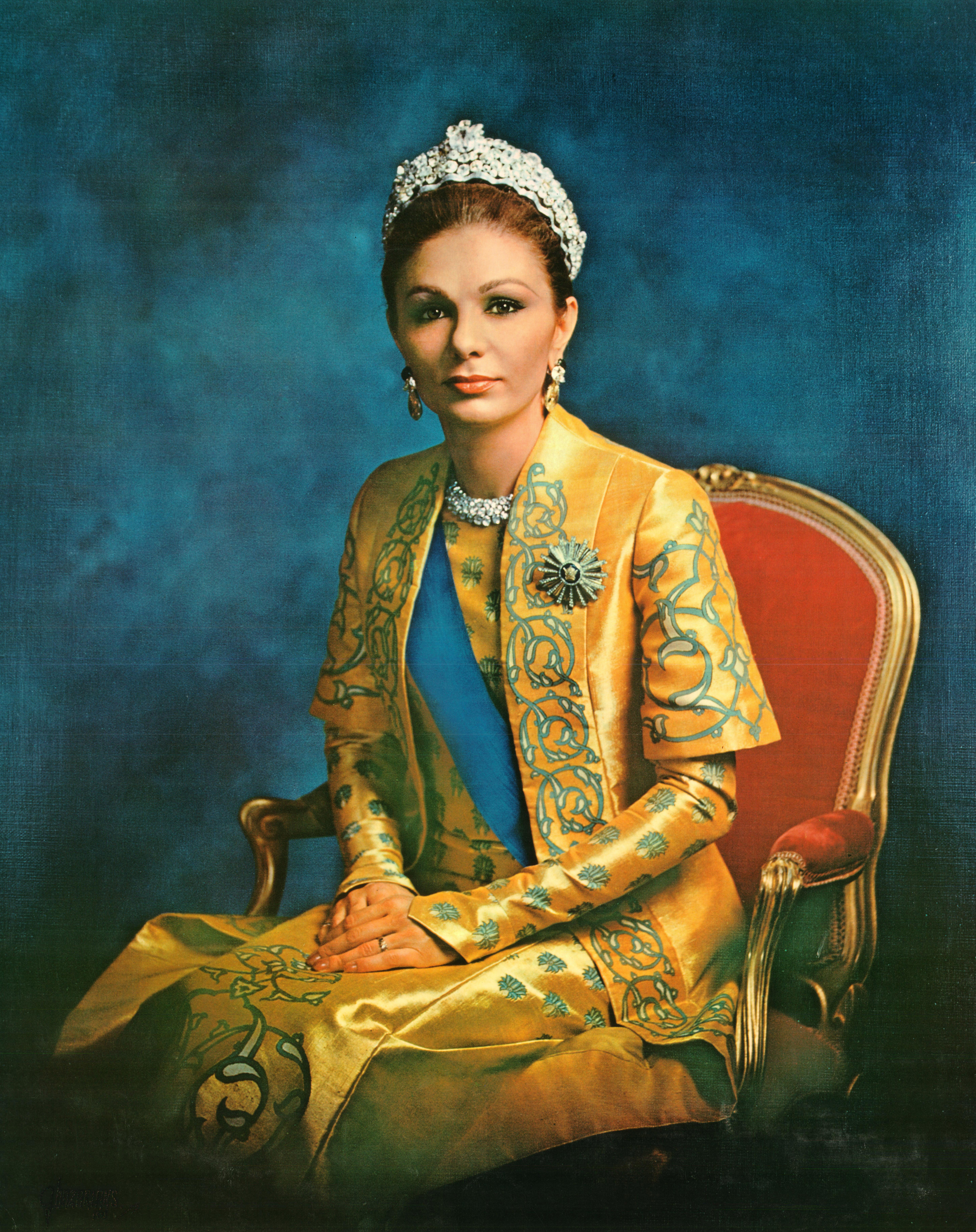
- Official portrait, c. 1973

Queen/empress consort of Iran (Note: The title of shahbanu (empress) was devised especially for Farah prior to her coronation.)
- Tenure: 21 December 1959 – 11 February 1979
- Coronation: 26 October 1967

Regent of the House of Pahlavi
- Tenure: 27 July 1980 – 31 October 1980
- Predecessor: Mohammad Reza Pahlavi
- Successor: Reza Pahlavi
- Born: Farah Diba; 14 October 1938 (age 88); Tehran, Iran
- Spouse: Mohammad Reza Pahlavi (m. 1959; died 1980)
- Issue: Crown Prince Reza; Princess Farahnaz; Prince Ali Reza; Princess Leila
- Persian: فرح پهلوی
- House: Pahlavi (by marriage)
- Father: Sohrab Diba
- Mother: Farideh Ghotbi
- Signature: Persian signature Latin signature

Farah Pahlavi (Persian: فرح پهلوی; née Diba [دیبا]; born 14 October 1938) is a member of the Pahlavi dynasty. She is the last queen and empress (شهبانو, Shahbânu) of Iran, and is the third wife and widow of the last shah of Iran, Mohammad Reza Pahlavi.

She was born into a prosperous Iranian family whose fortunes were diminished after her father's early death. While studying architecture in Paris, she was introduced to the Shah at the Iranian embassy, and they were married in December 1959. The Shah's first two marriages had not produced a son—necessary for royal succession—resulting in great rejoicing at the birth of Crown Prince Reza in October of the following year. As a philanthropist, she advanced the welfare of Iranian civil society through the establishment of charities and founded Iran's Shiraz University, Iran's first American-style university, increasing the number of women students. She also facilitated the recall of Iranian antiquities from museums abroad.

By 1978, growing anti-imperial unrest fueled by growing inequality between rich and poor throughout Iran was showing clear signs of impending revolution, prompting Farah and the Shah to leave the country in January 1979 under the threat of a death sentence. For that reason, most countries were reluctant to harbor them, with Anwar Sadat's Egypt being an exception. Facing execution should he return, and in ill health, Mohammad Reza died in exile in July 1980. Farah led the Pahlavi dynasty as regent until October 1980, when her son, Reza Pahlavi, declared himself Shah of Iran, ending Farah's regency.

Since 1979, she has lived in exile, primarily in the United States and France. She has been a vocal supporter of the Iranian protestors and critic of the Iranian Islamic regime in the wake of the killing of 22-year-old Mahsa Amini while in the custody of Iranian hijab police in 2022, the subsequent execution of Iranian protester Mohsen Shekari later that year, and the 2025–2026 Iranian protests.

== Childhood ==
Farah Diba was born on 14 October 1938 in Tehran, Iran, to an upper-class family. She was the only child of Captain Sohrab Diba (1899–1948), an officer in the Imperial Iranian Armed Forces and a graduate of the French Military Academy of St. Cyr, and his wife Farideh Ghotbi (1920–2000). In her memoir, Farah wrote that her father's family were natives of Iranian Azerbaijan while her mother's family were of Gilak origin, from Lahijan on the Iranian coast of the Caspian Sea.

In the late 19th century, her grandfather had been a diplomat serving as the Persian Ambassador to the Romanov Court in St. Petersburg, Russia. She was moreover a relative of Iranian politician Abolhassan Diba, Iranian architect Kamran Diba, and Iranian-American curator Layla Diba.

Farah wrote in her memoir that she had a close bond with her father, and his unexpected death in 1948 deeply affected her. The young family was in a difficult financial state. In their reduced circumstances, they were forced to move from their large family villa in northern Tehran into a shared apartment with one of Farideh Ghotbi's brothers.

== Education and engagement ==
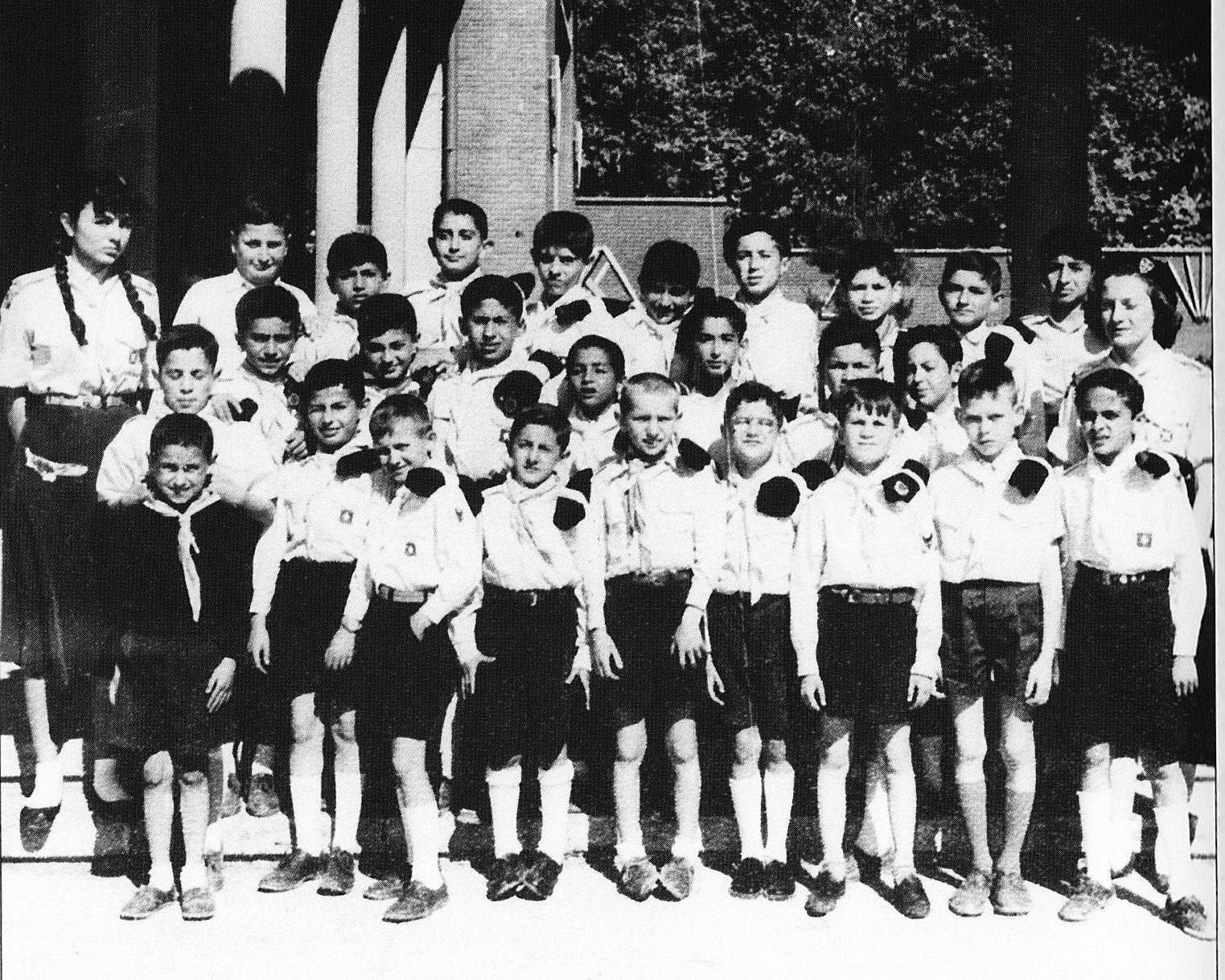
Farah (on the left) with Iranian Boy Scouts in Paris, (c. 1956)

The young Farah Diba began her education at Tehran's Italian School, then moved to the French Jeanne d’Arc School for girls until the age of 16, and later to the Lycée Razi. She was an athlete in her youth, becoming captain of her school's basketball team. Upon finishing her studies at the Lycée Razi, she pursued an interest in architecture at the École Spéciale d'Architecture in Paris, where she was a student of Albert Besson.

Many Iranian students who were studying abroad at this time were dependent on State sponsorship. Therefore, when the Shah, as head of state, made official visits to foreign countries, he frequently met with a selection of local Iranian students. It was during such a meeting, in 1959 at the Iranian Embassy in Paris, that Farah Diba was first presented to Mohammad Reza Pahlavi.

After returning to Tehran in the summer of 1959, Mohammad Reza and Farah Diba began their courtship. The couple announced their engagement on 23 November 1959.

== Marriage and family ==
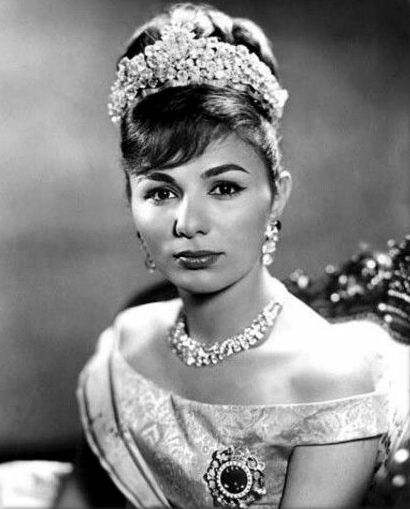
Farah Pahlavi in 1959

Farah Diba married Mohammad Reza Pahlavi on 20 December 1959, aged 21. The young Queen of Iran (as she was styled at the time) was the object of much curiosity and her wedding received worldwide press attention. Her gown was designed by Yves Saint Laurent, then a designer at the house of Dior, and she wore the newly commissioned Noor-ol-Ain Diamond tiara.

After the pomp and celebrations associated with the imperial wedding, the success of this union depended on the birth of a male heir. Although he had been married twice before, the Shah's previous marriages had given him only a daughter who, under agnatic primogeniture, could not inherit the throne. The pressure for Farah was acute. The shah himself was deeply anxious to have a male heir as were the members of his government. Furthermore, it was known that the dissolution of the Mohammad Reza's previous marriage to Queen Soraya had been due to her infertility.

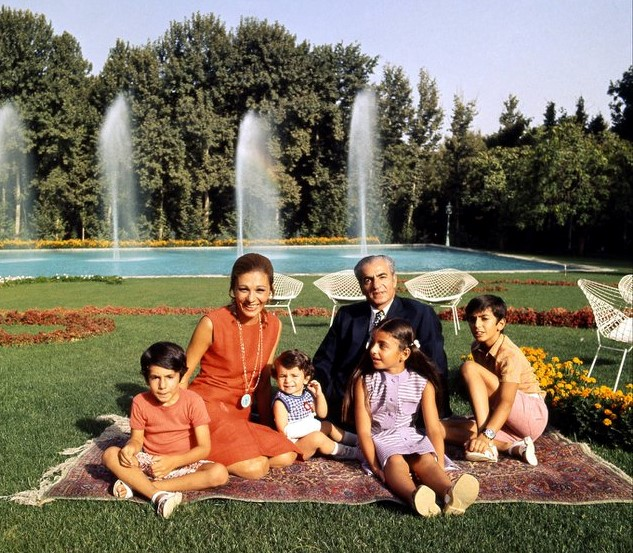
Farah and Mohammad Reza with their four children, 1973

The couple had four children:

- Crown Prince Reza Pahlavi of Iran (born 31 October 1960). He and his wife Yasmine have three daughters.
  - Princess Noor Pahlavi (born 3 April 1992)
  - Princess Iman Pahlavi (born 12 September 1993)
  - Princess Farah Pahlavi (born 17 January 2004)
- Princess Farahnaz Pahlavi of Iran (born 12 March 1963)
- Prince Ali Reza Pahlavi of Iran (28 April 1966 – 4 January 2011). He and his companion Raha Didevar had one daughter.
  - Iryana Leila Pahlavi (born 26 July 2011)
- Princess Leila Pahlavi of Iran (27 March 1970 – 10 June 2001)

== As queen and empress ==
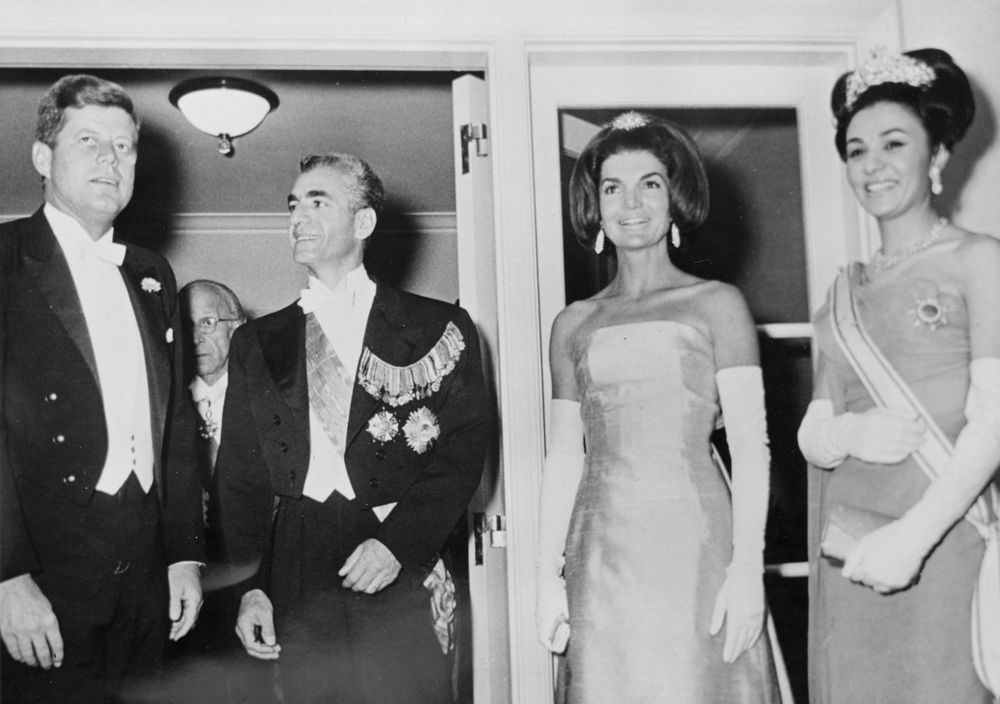
Dinner in Honor of U.S. President John F. Kennedy and First Lady Jacqueline Kennedy at the Embassy of Iran in 1962.

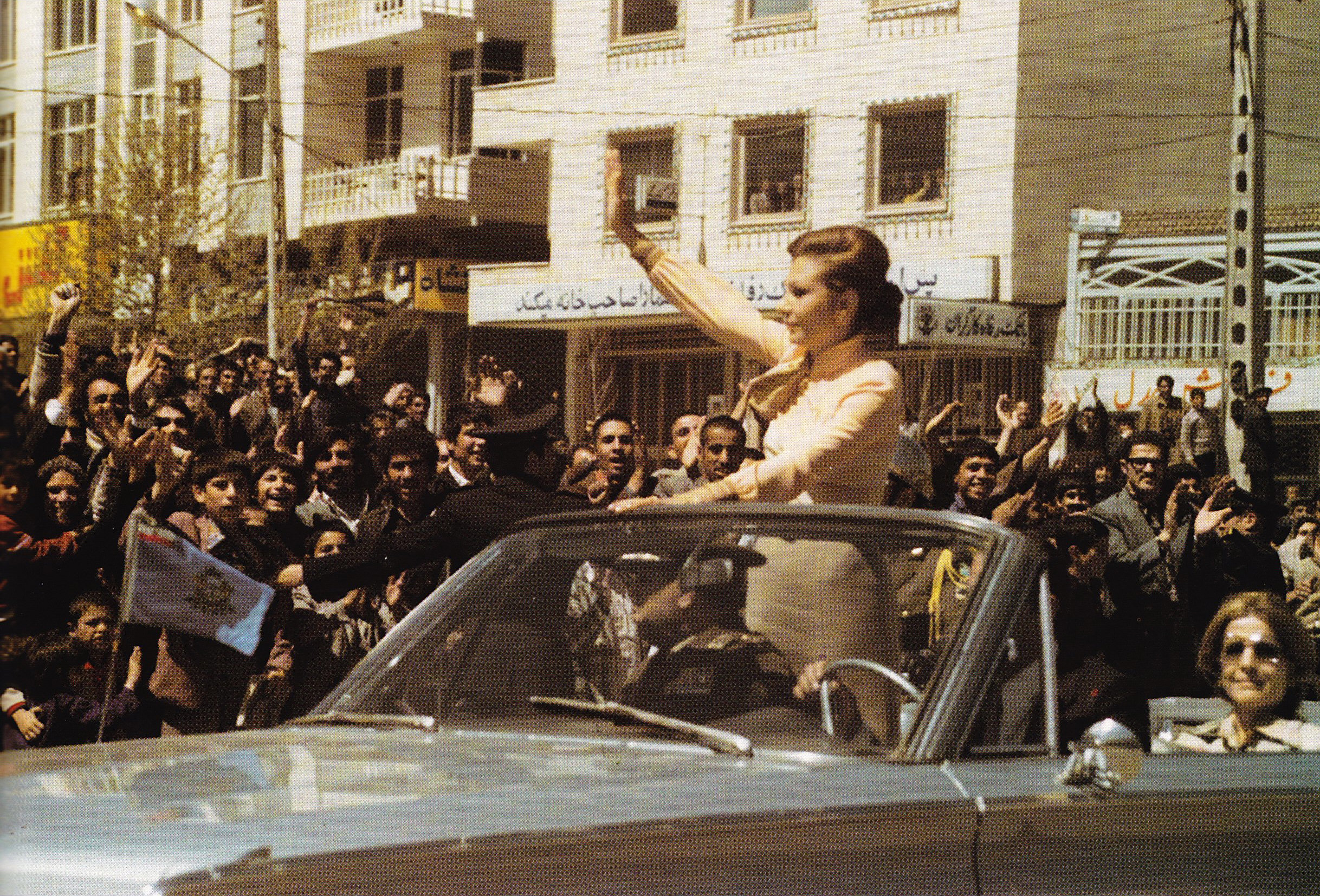
The Queen on a visit to Kermanshah, Iran, 1963

The exact role the new queen would play, in public or government affairs, was uncertain with her main role being simply to give the Shah a male heir. Within the Imperial Household, her public function was secondary to the far more pressing matter of assuring the succession. However, after the birth of the Crown Prince in 1960, the Queen was free to devote more of her time to other activities and official pursuits.

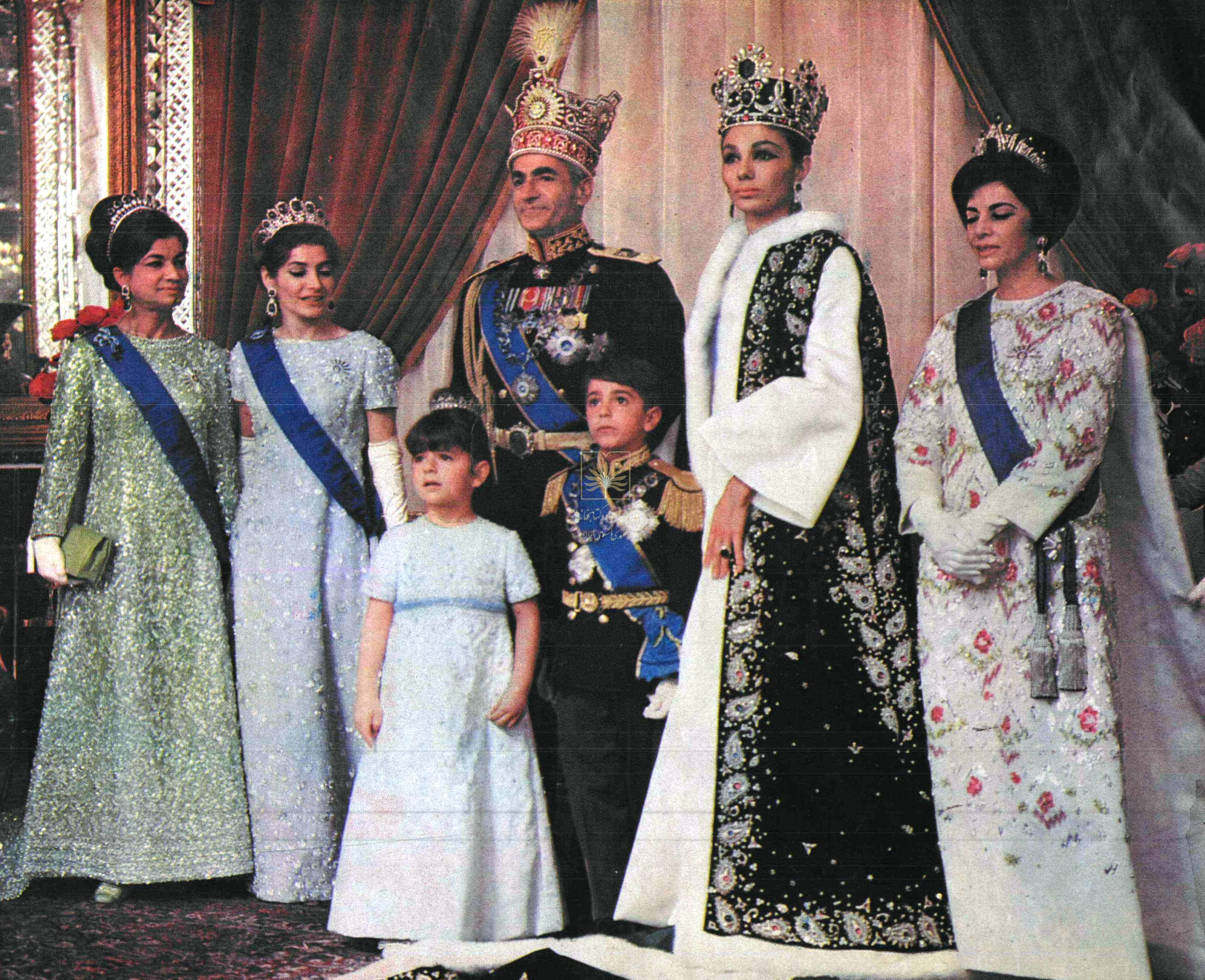
Pahlavi family coronation, 1967

Farah's significance was exemplified by her part in the 1967 Coronation Ceremonies, where she was crowned as the first shahbanu (empress) of modern Iran. It was again confirmed when the Shah named her as the official regent should he die or be incapacitated before the Crown Prince's 21st birthday. The naming of a woman as regent was highly unusual for a Middle Eastern or Muslim monarchy.

Farah worked long hours at her charitable activities, from about 9 am to 9 pm every weekday. Eventually, the Queen came to preside over a staff of 40 who handled various requests for assistance on a range of issues. She became one of the most highly visible figures in the Imperial Government and the patron of 24 educational, health and cultural organizations.

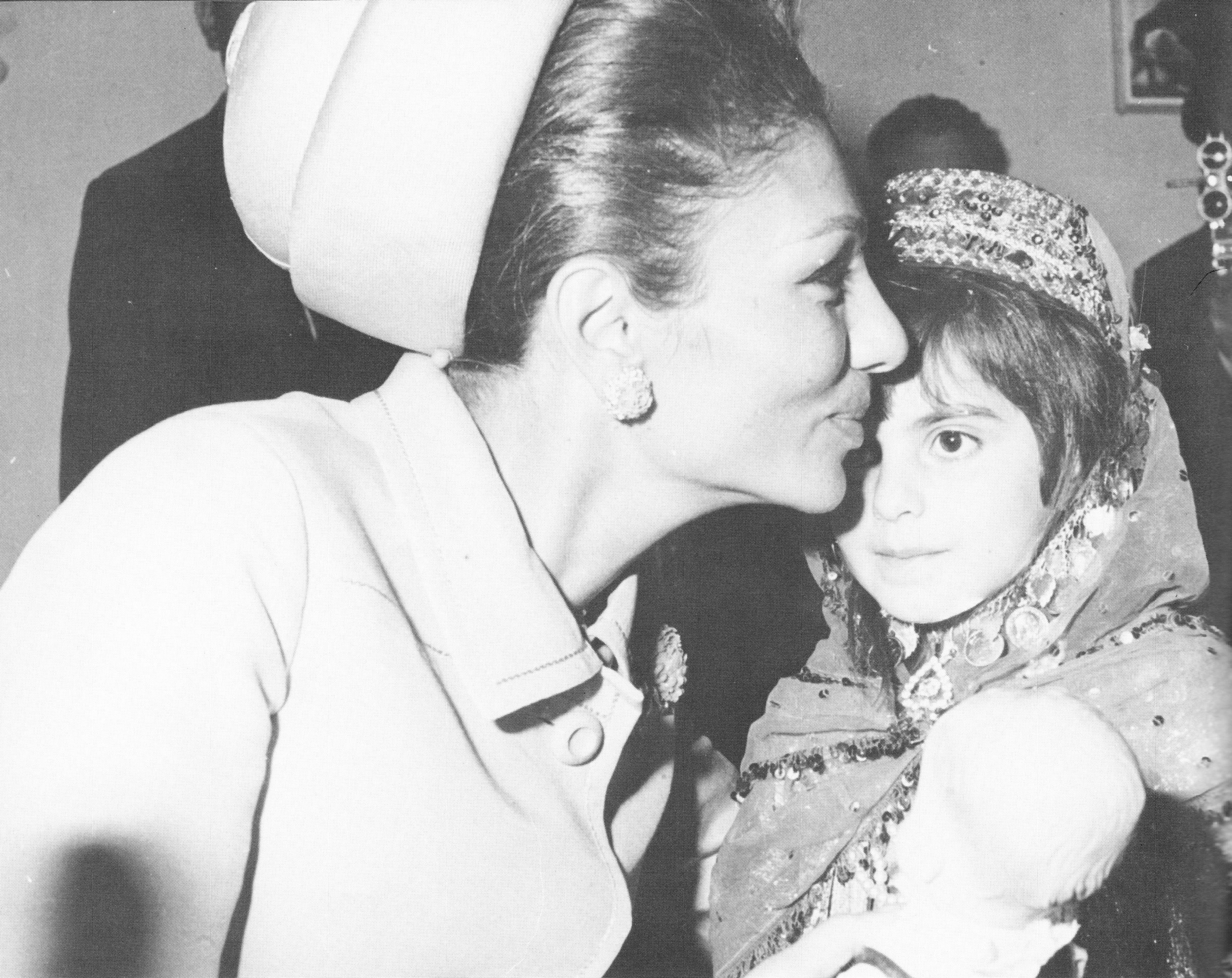
Farah visiting an orphanage in Iran, c. 1968

Her humanitarian role earned her immense popularity for a time, particularly in the early 1970s. During this period, she traveled a great deal within Iran, visiting some of the more remote parts of the country and meeting with the local citizens.

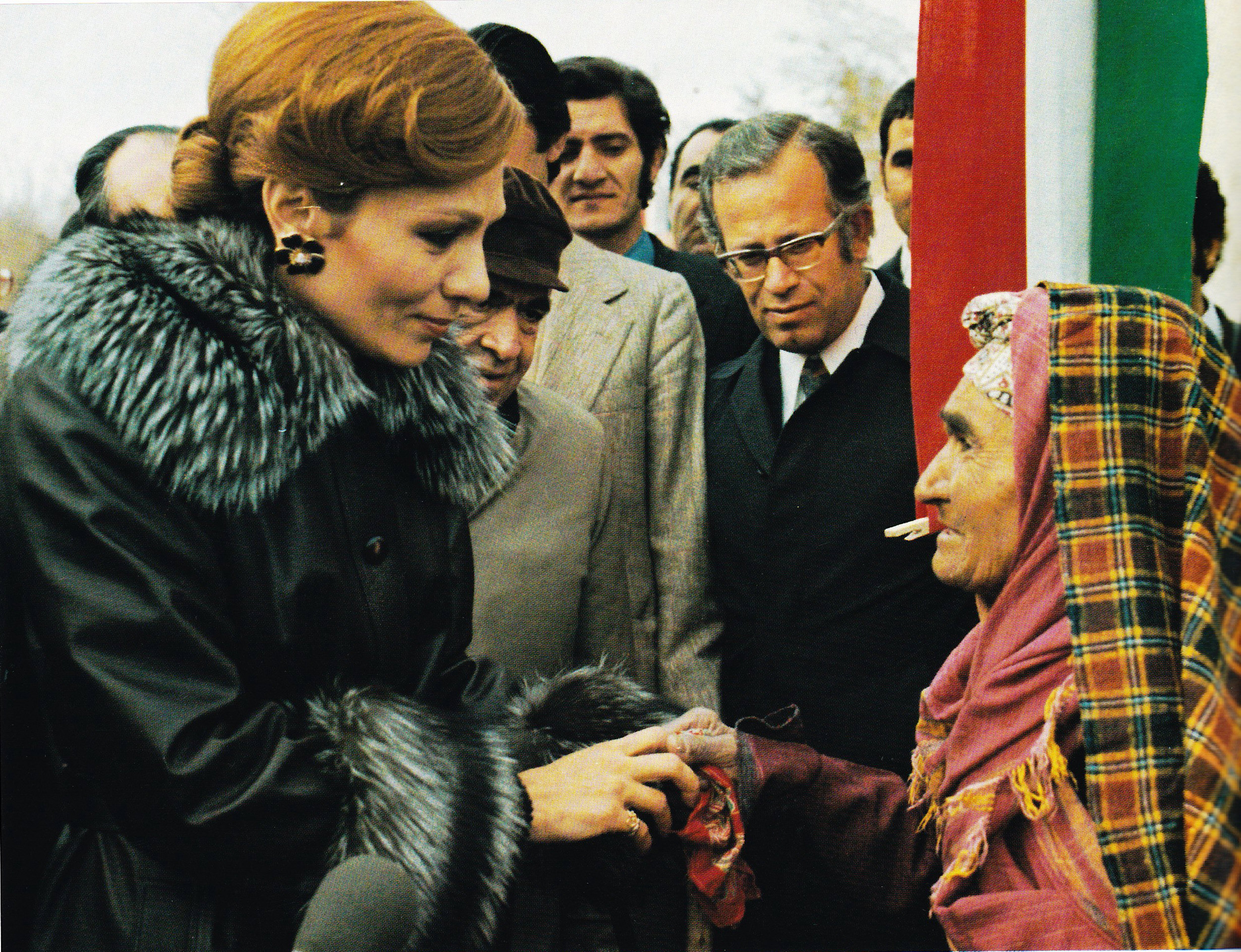
The Empress during a visit to Kavir, Iran, 1974

Like many other royal consorts, Farah initially limited herself to a ceremonial role. In 1961 during a visit to France, the Francophile Farah befriended the French culture minister André Malraux, leading her to arrange the exchange of cultural artifacts between French and Iranian art galleries and museums, a lively trade that continued until the Islamic revolution of 1979.

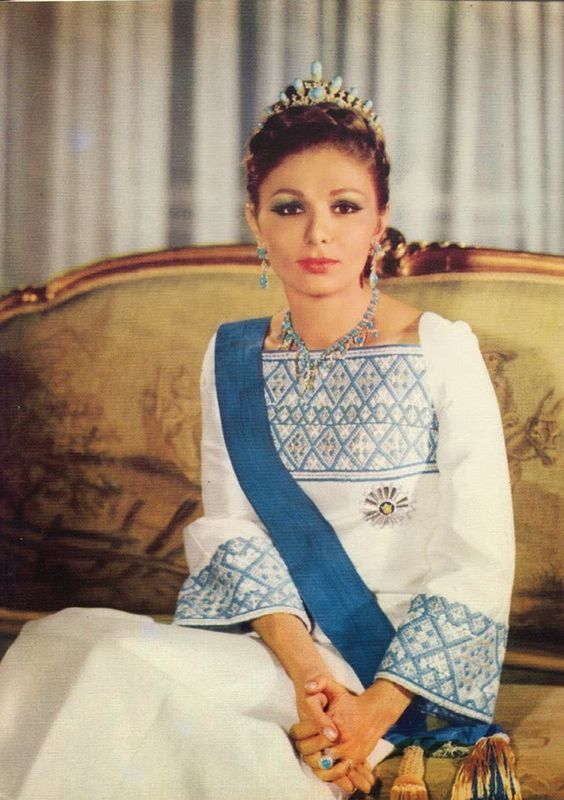
Farah Pahlavi, 1975

She spent much of her time attending the openings of various education and health-care institutions without venturing too deeply into controversial issues. However, as time progressed, this position changed. The Queen became much more actively involved in government affairs when it concerned issues and causes that interested her. She used her proximity and influence with her husband Mohammad Reza, to secure funding and focus attention on causes, particularly in the areas of women's rights and cultural development. Farah's concerns were the "realms of education, health, culture and social matters" with politics being excluded from her purview.

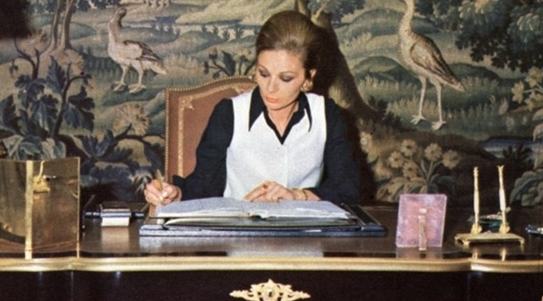
The Empress in her office in Tehran, c. 1970s

One of Farah's main initiatives was founding Pahlavi University (now Shiraz University), which was meant to improve the education of Iranian women, and was the first American-style university in Iran; before then, Iranian universities had always been modeled on the French style. The Empress wrote in 1978 that her duties were:

I could not write in detail of all the organizations over which I preside and in which I take a very active part, in the realms of education, health, culture and social matters. It would need a further book. A simple list would perhaps give some idea: the Organization for Family Well Being-nurseries for the children of working mothers, teaching women and girls to read, professional training, family planning; the Organization for Blood Transfusion; the Organization for the Fight Against Cancer; the Organization for Help to the Needy, the Health Organization ... the Children's Center; the Center for the Intellectual Development of Children ... the Imperial Institute of Philosophy; the Foundation for Iranian Culture; the Festival of Shiraz, the Tehran Cinema Festival; the Iranian Folklore Organization; the Asiatic Institute; the Civilizations Discussion Center; the Pahlavi University; the Academy of Sciences.

The great wealth generated by Iran's oil encouraged a sense of Iranian nationalism at the Imperial Court. The Empress recalled of her days as a university student in 1950s France about being asked where she was from:

When I told them Iran ... the Europeans would recoil in horror as if Iranians were barbarians and loathsome. But after Iran became wealthy under the Shah in the 1970s, Iranians were courted everywhere. Yes, Your Majesty. Of course, Your Majesty. If you please, Your Majesty. Fawning all over us. Greedy sycophants. Then they loved Iranians.

== Contributions to art and culture ==
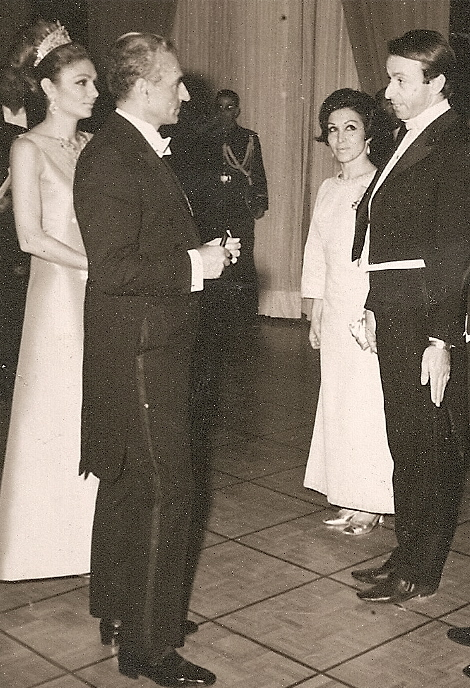
At the opening of the Roudaki Hall, with the Shah and British ballet master and choreographer Robert de Warren, 1967.

From the beginning of her royal life, Farah took an active interest in promoting culture and the arts in Iran. Through her patronage, numerous organizations were created and fostered to further her ambition of bringing historical and contemporary Iranian art to prominence both inside Iran and in the Western world.

In addition to her own efforts, Farah sought to achieve this goal with the assistance of various foundations and advisors. Her ministry encouraged many forms of artistic expression, including traditional Iranian arts (such as weaving, singing, and poetry recital) as well as Western theater. Her most recognized endeavor in supporting the performing arts was her patronage of the Shiraz Arts Festival. This occasionally controversial event was held annually from 1967 until 1977 and featured live performances by both Iranian and Western artists.

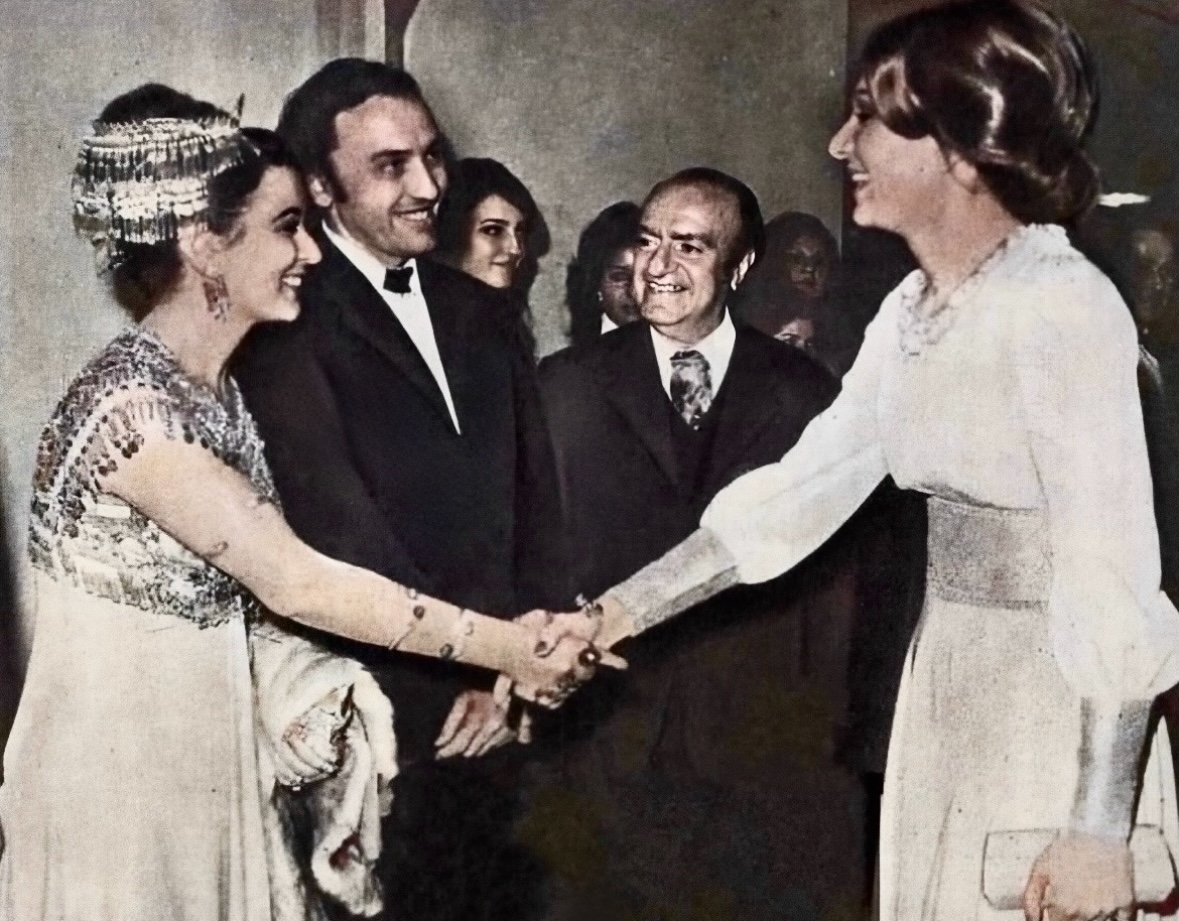
Farah shaking hands with Egyptian actress Soad Hosny and Egyptian writer Youssef Francis at the Tehran International Film Festival, 1973

The majority of her time, however, went into the creation of museums and the building of their collections.

As a former architecture student, Farah's appreciation of it is demonstrated in the Royal Palace of Niavaran, designed by Mohsen Foroughi, and completed in 1968: it mixes traditional Iranian architecture with 1960s contemporary design. Nearby is the personal library of the Empress, consisting of 22,000 books, comprising principally works on Western and Eastern art, philosophy and religion; the interior was designed by Aziz Farmanfarmayan.

She also initiated the creation of urban parks such as Farah Park, Imperial Park, and Jamshidieh Park. These green spaces also became sites for the construction of cultural centres and museums.

=== Ancient art ===
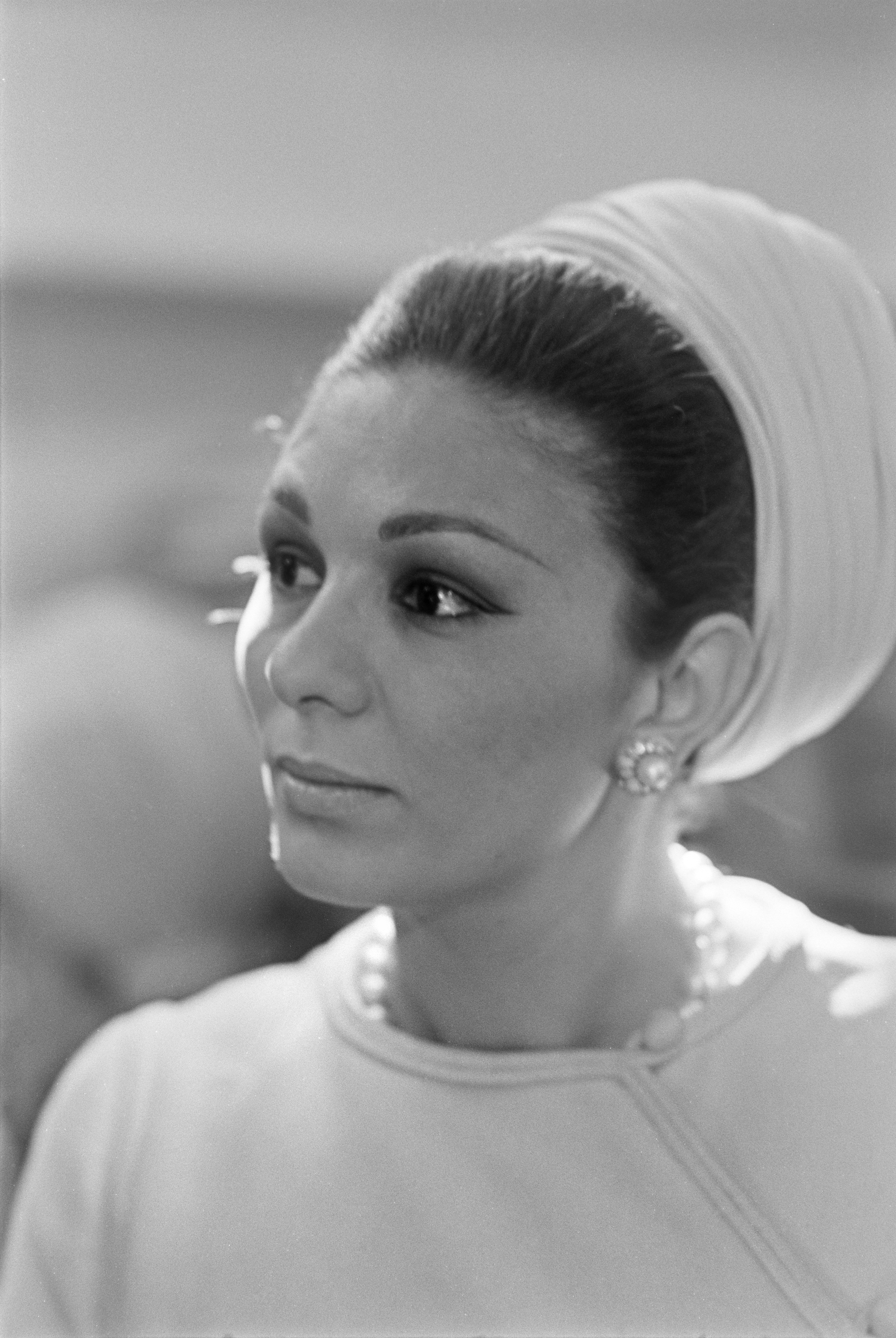
Farah Pahlavi, 1970

Historically a culturally rich country, Iran in the 1960s had little to show for it. Many of the great artistic treasures produced during its 2,500-year history had found their way into the hands of foreign museums and private collections. It became one of Farah's principal goals to procure for Iran an appropriate collection of its own historic artifacts. To that end, she secured from her husband's government permission and funds to "buy back" a wide selection of Iranian artifacts from foreign and domestic collections. This was achieved with the help of the brothers Houshang and Mehdi Mahboubian, the most prominent Iranian antiquities dealers of the era, who advised the Empress from 1972 to 1978. With these artifacts she founded several national museums (many of which still survive to this day) and began an Iranian version of the National Trust.

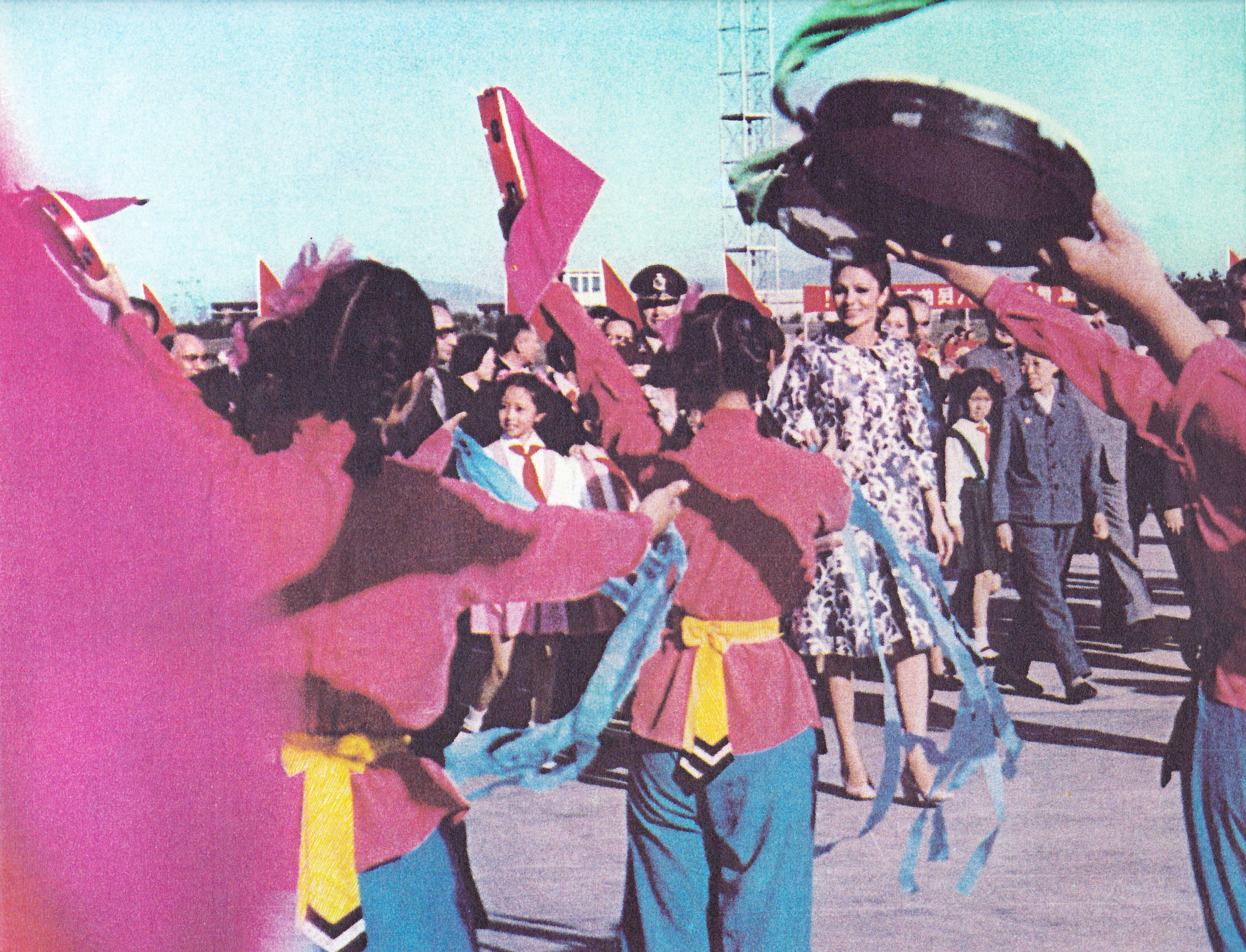
Farah on a state visit to China in 1972

Museums and cultural centers created under her guidance include the Negarestan Cultural Center, the Reza Abbasi Museum, the Khorramabad Museum with its valuable collection of Luristan bronzes, the National Carpet Gallery and the Glassware and Ceramic Museum of Iran.

=== Contemporary art ===
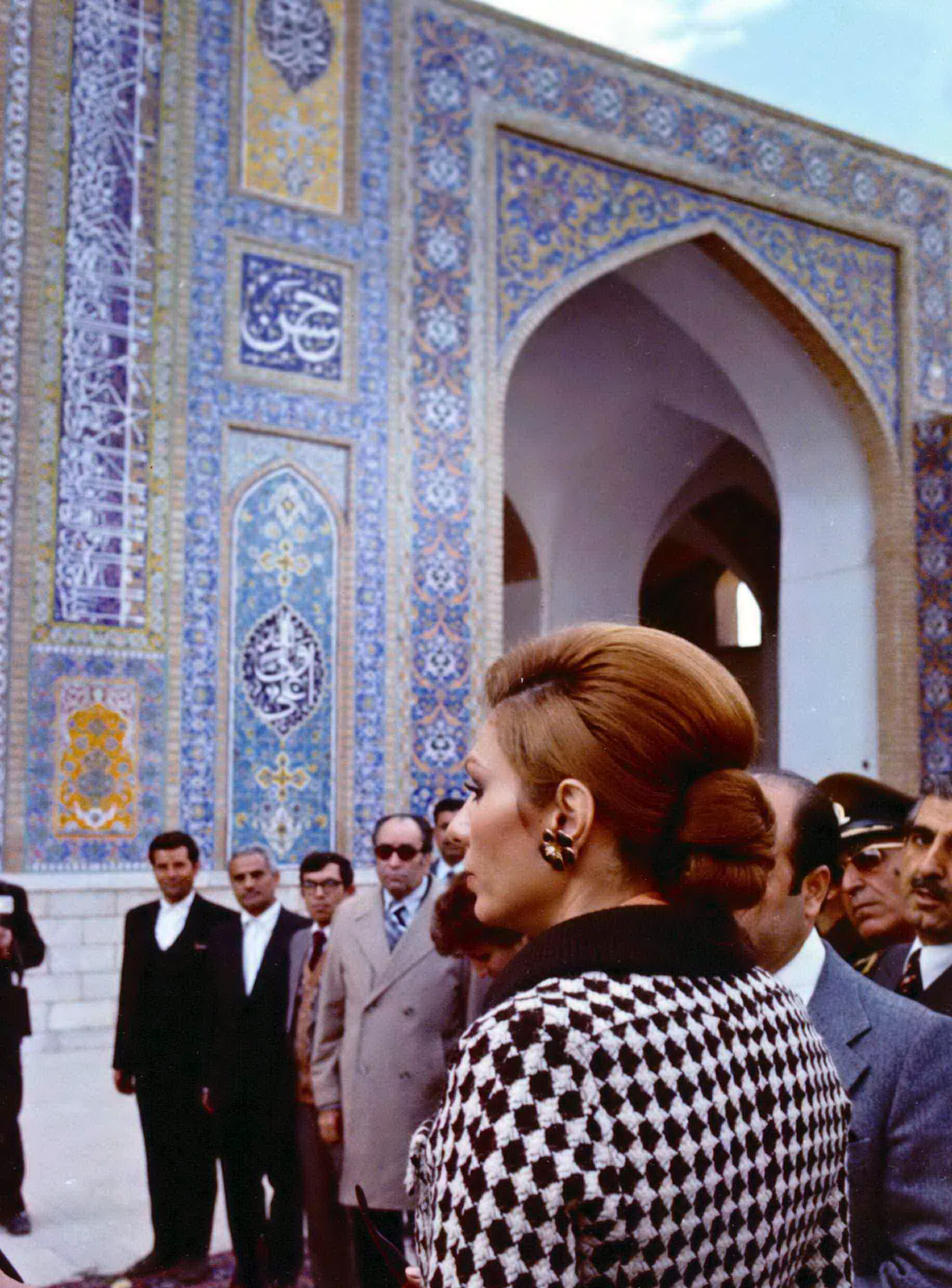
Farah at the Jameh Mosque of Sabzevar, 1974

Aside from building a collection of historic Iranian artifacts, Farah also expressed interest in acquiring contemporary Western and Iranian art. To this end, she put her significant patronage behind the Tehran Museum of Contemporary Art.

Using funds allocated from the government, the Shahbanu took advantage of the somewhat depressed art market of the 1970s to purchase several important works of Western art. Under her guidance, the museum acquired nearly 150 works by such artists as Pablo Picasso, Claude Monet, George Grosz, Andy Warhol, Jackson Pollock, and Roy Lichtenstein. The collection of the Tehran Museum of Contemporary Art is considered to be one of the most significant outside Europe and the United States. The vast collection has been showcased in a large coffee table book published by Assouline titled Iran Modern According to Parviz Tanavoli, a modern Iranian sculptor and a former Cultural Advisor to the Empress, the collection was amassed for "tens, not hundreds, of millions of dollars". As of 2008, the value of these holdings was conservatively estimated to be near US$2.8 billion.

The collection created a conundrum for the anti-western Islamic Republic which took power after the fall of the Pahlavi dynasty in 1979. Although politically the fundamentalist government rejected Western influence in Iran, the Western art collection amassed by Farah was retained, most likely due to its enormous value. It was, nevertheless, not publicly displayed and spent nearly two decades in storage in the vaults of the Tehran Museum of Contemporary Art. This caused much speculation about the fate of the artwork, which was only put to rest after a large portion of the collection was briefly seen again in an exhibition that took place in Tehran during September 2005.

== Islamic Revolution and life in exile ==
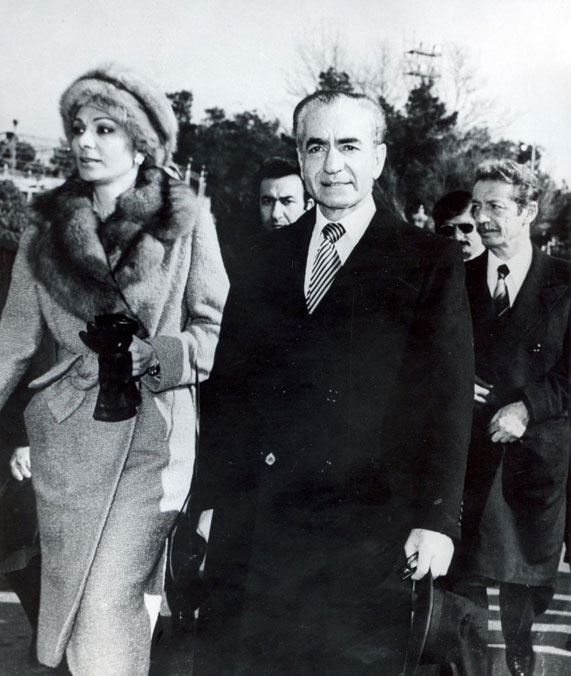
The Shah and the Shahbanu on 16 January 1979, shortly before leaving Iran due to the Islamic Revolution

By early 1978, dissatisfaction with Iran's secularist imperial government was growing. By the end of the year, Islamists were demonstrating against the monarchy. Pahlavi wrote in her memoirs that "there was an increasingly palpable sense of unease". Under these circumstances most of the Shahbanu's official activities were cancelled due to concerns for her safety.

Riots and unrest grew more frequent and culminated in January 1979. The government enacted martial law in most major Iranian cities and the country was on the verge of an open revolution. Mohammad Reza and Farah departed Iran via aircraft on 16 January 1979. For more than a year, the couple searched for permanent asylum. Many governments were unwilling to allow them within their borders because the revolutionary government in Iran had ordered the Shah's and Shahbanu's arrest and death and it was not known how much it would pressure foreign powers.

Egyptian president Anwar Sadat, who had maintained close relations with Mohammad Reza for years (and whose wife Jehan Sadat was friends with Farah), allowed them to stay in Egypt. They also spent time in Morocco, where they were guests of King Hassan II, and in the Bahamas. When their Bahamian visas were not renewed, they went to Mexico and rented a villa in Cuernavaca near Mexico City during the summer of 1979.

After leaving Egypt, Mohammad Reza's health further declined from Non-Hodgkin lymphoma. In October 1979, the couple was allowed into the United States for medical treatment, inflaming already tense relations between the US government and the revolutionaries in Tehran. The tensions ultimately led to the attack and takeover of the American embassy in Tehran in what became known as the Iran hostage crisis. The Shah and Shahbanu were not permitted to remain in the United States, and shortly after the Shah's surgical treatment on 22 October 1979, the couple departed for Contadora Island in Panama. Both Mohammad Reza and Farah viewed the Carter administration with some antipathy in response to its lack of support.

Speculation arose that the Panamanian government was seeking to arrest Mohammad Reza in preparation for extradition to Iran. The Shah and Shahbanu again made an appeal to President Anwar Sadat to return to Egypt (Empress Farah wrote that this plea was made through a conversation that she had with Jehan Sadat). Their request was granted, and they returned to Egypt in March 1980, where they remained until the Shah's death four months later on 27 July 1980.

=== After the Shah's death ===
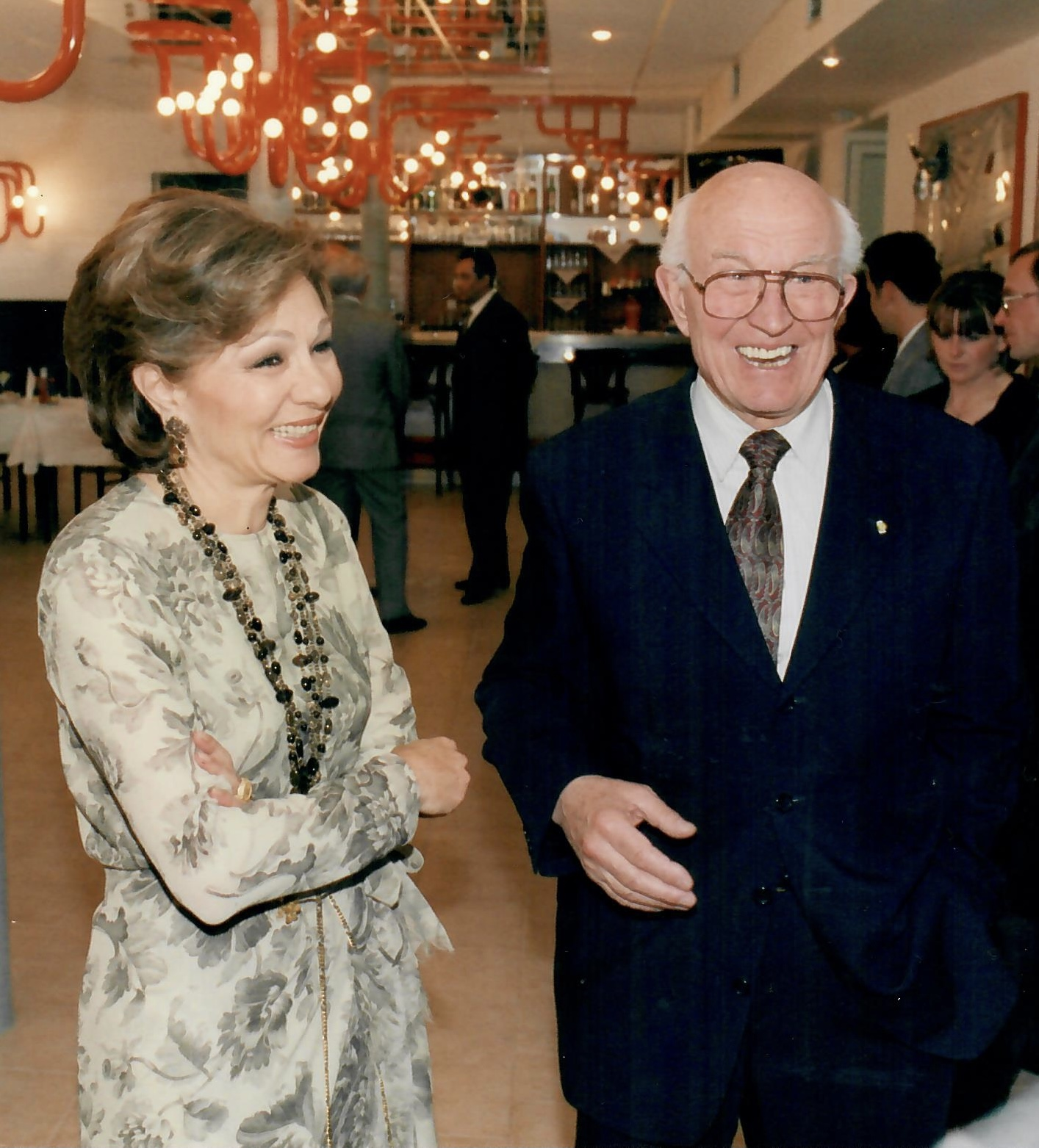
Farah and Czech audiovisual artist Jaroslav Frič, 1996

After the Shah's death, Farah spent two years in Egypt, where President Anwar Sadat allowed her and the children to stay in the Koubbeh Palace. She was the regent in pretense from 27 July to 31 October 1980. A few months after President Sadat's assassination in October 1981, Farah and her family left Egypt. President Ronald Reagan informed her that she was welcome in the United States.

Farah first settled in Williamstown, Massachusetts, and later bought a home in Greenwich, Connecticut. After the death of her daughter Princess Leila in 2001, she purchased a smaller home in Potomac, Maryland, near Washington, D.C. to be closer to her son and grandchildren. Farah divides her time between Washington, D.C. and Paris and makes an annual July visit to Mohammad Reza Shah's mausoleum at Cairo's al-Rifa'i Mosque.

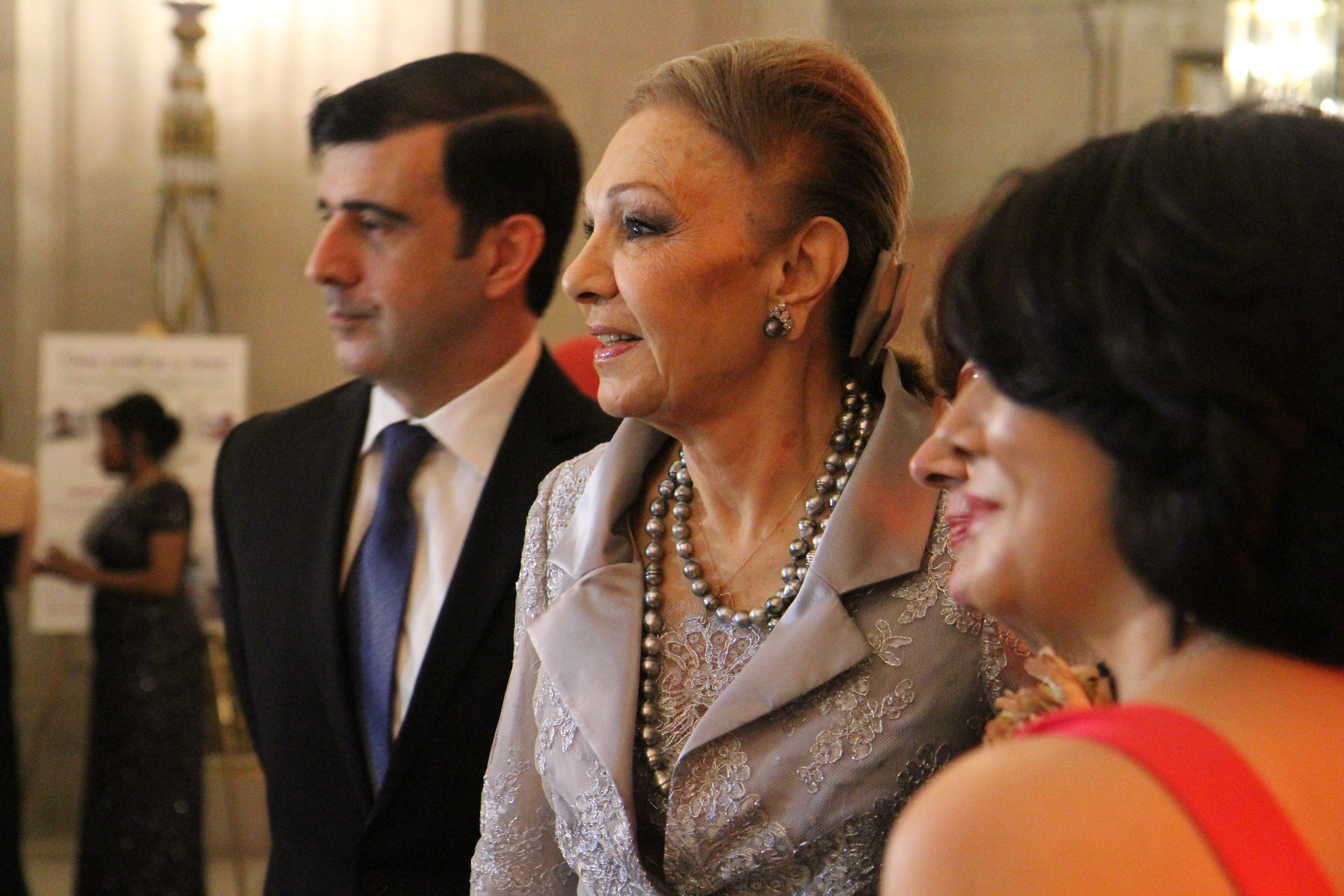
Farah in Washington, D.C., in March 2016

In several TV interviews in French and English, Farah Pahlavi has spoken about her time as Empress of Iran, the Shah, her children, the Iranian Revolution and her life in exile.

Farah attended the funeral of former U.S. president Ronald Reagan in 2004 in Washington, D.C. She supports charities, among them is the International Fund Raising for Alzheimer's Disease gala in Paris.

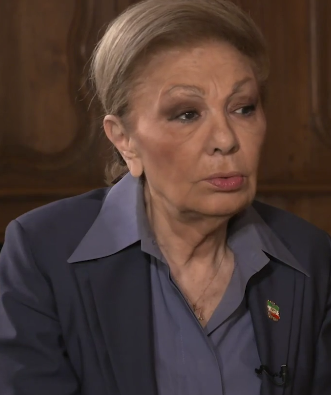
Farah during an interview with Voice of America, c. 2020

Farah continues to appear at certain international royal events including the 2004 wedding of Crown Prince Frederik of Denmark, the 2010 wedding of Prince Nikolaos of Greece and Denmark, the 2011 wedding of Albert II, Prince of Monaco, the 2016 wedding of Prince Leka of Albania, the 2023 funeral of Constantine II of Greece, the 2023 wedding of Crown Prince Hussein of Jordan, and the wedding of her granddaughter Iman Pahlavi to Bradley Sherman in 2025.

=== 2020s ===
After the killing of 22-year-old Mahsa Amini while in the custody of Iranian hijab police in 2022, Pahlavi wrote on Instagram that the Islamic Republic regime was “anti-feminist”, and that “once again, a child from Iran lost her life at the hands of anti-Iranian government guards.” After the subsequent execution of Iranian protester Mohsen Shekari later that year, she wrote on Twitter: "the bloodthirsty and youth-killing regime of the Islamic Republic took another young man's life in prison this time. Mohsen Shekari was only 23 years old and like other young people had no wish but a dignified life, freedom, and prosperity for Iran.” That year she also wrote to FIFA president Gianni Infantino, asking him to use the FIFA World Cup as an opportunity to encourage the Iranian government to allow Iranian women and girls into football stadiums in Iran, especially at FIFA games, calling the ban "shameful."

During the 2025–2026 Iranian protests, Pahlavi was interviewed by Agence France-Presse in Paris, and said that her return to Iran "will take place soon", expressed admiration for protesters and said that "there is no turning back" from the current protests.

In an interview with AFP after the beginning of the 2026 Iran War, Farah urged the international community to respect the rights of Iranians "to choose their leaders", and said that her son was "in the process of preparing" a transition should the Islamic Republic fall. She also described the holiday of Nowruz as a moment that symbolizes an "awakening" to reclaim freedom in Iran.

=== Memoir ===
In 2003, Farah wrote a book about her marriage to Mohammad Reza entitled An Enduring Love: My Life with the Shah. The publication of the former Empress's memoirs attracted international interest. It was a best-seller in Europe, with excerpts appearing in news magazines and the author appearing on talk shows and in other media outlets. However, opinion about the book, which Publishers Weekly called "a candid, straightforward account" and The Washington Post called "engrossing", was mixed.

Elaine Sciolino, The New York Times's Paris bureau chief, gave the book a less than flattering review, describing it as "well translated" but "full of anger and bitterness". But National Review's Reza Bayegan, an Iranian writer, praised the memoir as "abound[ing] with affection and sympathy for her countrymen."

=== Documentaries and play ===
In 2009, the Persian-Swedish director Nahid Persson Sarvestani released a feature length documentary about Farah Pahlavi's life, entitled The Queen and I. The film was screened in various international film festivals such as the International Documentary Film Festival Amsterdam (IDFA) and Sundance. In 2012, the Dutch director Kees Roorda wrote a play inspired by the life of Farah Pahlavi in exile, Liz Snoijink played Farah.

== Honors ==
Styles of Empress Farah of Iran
- Reference style: Her Imperial Majesty
- Spoken style: Your Imperial Majesty

=== National ===
- Member 1st Class of the Order of the Pleiades

=== Foreign ===
- Austria: Grand Star of the Decoration of Honour for Services to the Republic of Austria
- Czechoslovakia: Grand Cross of the Order of the White Lion
- Denmark: Order of the Elephant
- Italy: Grand Cross with Collar of the Order of Merit of the Italian Republic
- Norway: Grand Cross of the Order of Saint Olav
- Spain:Grand Cross of the Order of Isabella the Catholic
- Thailand: Dame of the Most Illustrious Order of the Royal House of Chakri

=== Awards ===
- Look! Women of the Year Hope Award
- Foreign Associate Academician of the Académie des Beaux-Arts
- Steiger Award
- Südwestfalen Charlie Award
- National Museum of Women in the Arts Award for International Cultural Patronage

== See also ==
- Empress's Crown
- List of Iranian women royalty

== Bibliography ==
- My Thousand and One Days: An Autobiography. ISBN 978-0-4910-2146-3
  - 1001 Days: Memoirs of an Empress. ISBN 978-1-7355-6060-1
- An Enduring Love: My Life with the Shah. ISBN 978-1-4013-5961-4

Farah Pahlavi House of Pahlavi Born: 14 October 1938
Iranian royalty
Vacant Title last held by Soraya Esfandiary-Bakhtiary	Queen consort of Iran; 1959–1967; Empress consort of Iran; 1967–1979	Monarchy abolished Iranian Revolution
Titles in pretence
Preceded by Mohammad Reza Pahlavi as Shah in pretence	— TITULAR — Regent of Iran; 27 July 1980 – 31 October 1980; Reason for succession failure: Monarchy abolished in 1979	Succeeded by Reza Pahlavi as Shah in pretence
