= Jameh Mosque of Sabzevar =

Shi'ite mosque in Sabzevar, Razavi Khorasan, Iran

Jāmeh Mosque of Sabzevar
- مسجد جامع سبزوار
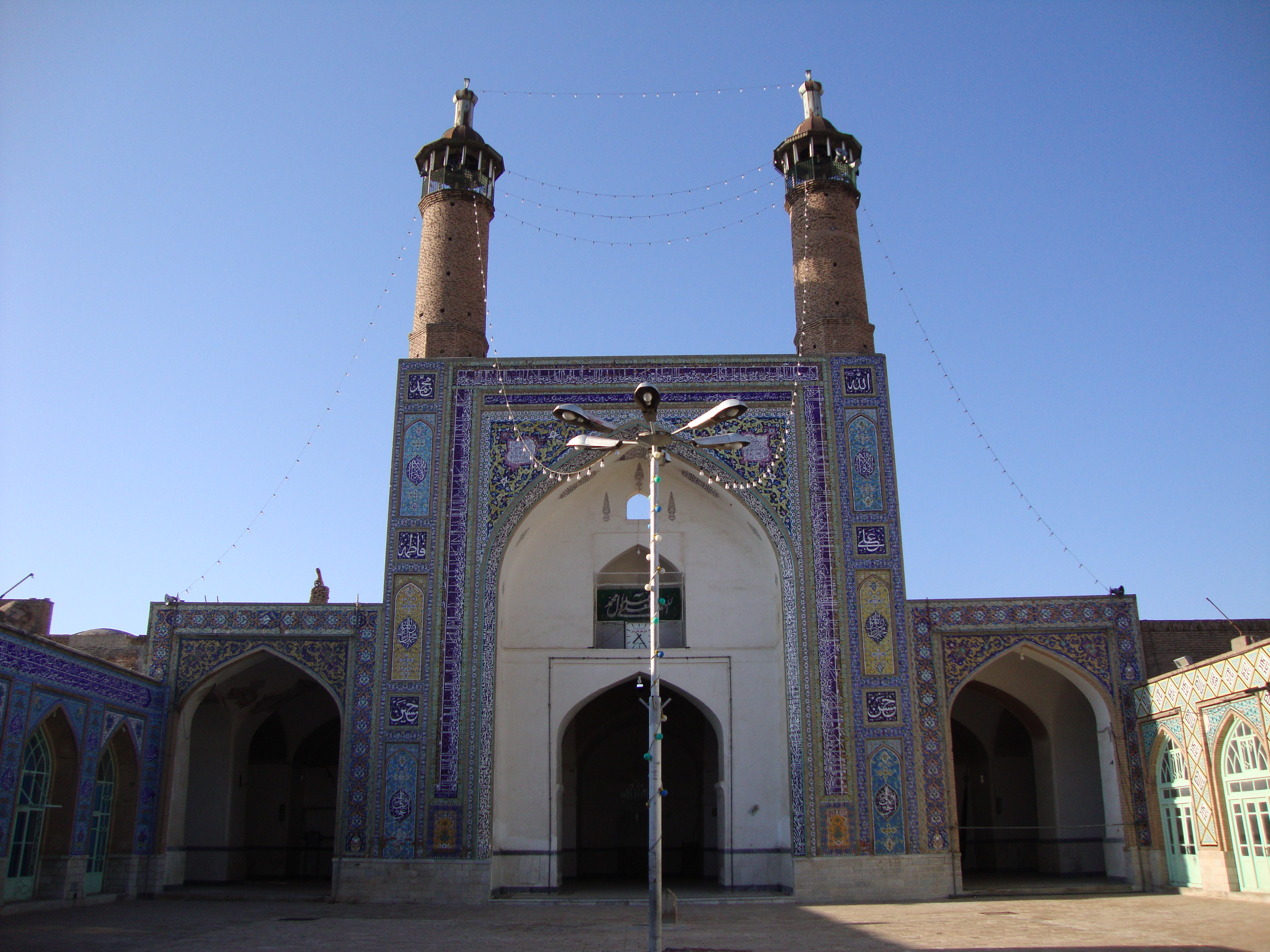
- The mosque in 2011

- Location of the mosque in Iran

Religion
- Affiliation: Shia Islam
- Ecclesiastical or organizational status: Friday mosque
- Status: Active

Location
- Location: Sabzevar, Razavi Khorasan Province
- Country: Iran
- Interactive map of Jāmeh Mosque of Sabzevar
- Coordinates: 36°12′27″N 57°30′47″E

Architecture
- Type: Mosque architecture
- Style: Sarbedaran; Ilkhanid; Safavid
- Completed: 13–14th century CE (first structure); 1572 CE

Specifications
- Dome: One (maybe more)
- Minaret: Two
- Materials: Bricks; mortar; tiles

Iran National Heritage List
- Official name: Jāmeh Mosque of Sabzevar
- Type: Built
- Designated: 17 January 1977
- Reference no.: 1316
- Conservation organization: Cultural Heritage, Handicrafts and Tourism Organization of Iran

The Jāmeh Mosque of Sabzevar (Persian: مسجد جامع سبزوار; Arabic: جامع سبزوار) is a Shi'ite Friday mosque (jāmeh) located in Sabzevar, in the province of Razavi Khorasan, Iran. The mosque was commenced in the 13th or 14th century CE, during the Sarbedaran period, and was completed in 1572 CE.

The mosque was added to the Iran National Heritage List on 17 January 1977, administered by the Cultural Heritage, Handicrafts and Tourism Organization of Iran.

== Architecture ==
This building shows the architectural features of the 8th century AH, or the 13th and 14th centuries CE. The mosque has two prayer niches (mihrabs), the first of which was built for Sunni Muslims and the second, constructed inside the first, was designed for Shi'ite Muslims. A Nast'aliq stone inscription above the entrance bears a decree from the Safavid ruler Tahmasp I. Two more inscriptions on the eastern walls bear orders from Tahmasp II and the Qajar ruler Naser al-din Shah. The mosque has two minarets, two iwans and two sanctuaries. The mosque façade is covered with multi-colored tiles covered with floral patterns and Qur'anic script. During Reza Shah's reign, the portal of the mosque was demolished after some changes in the structure of the city and Beyhaq Street, and then reconstructed.

== Gallery ==
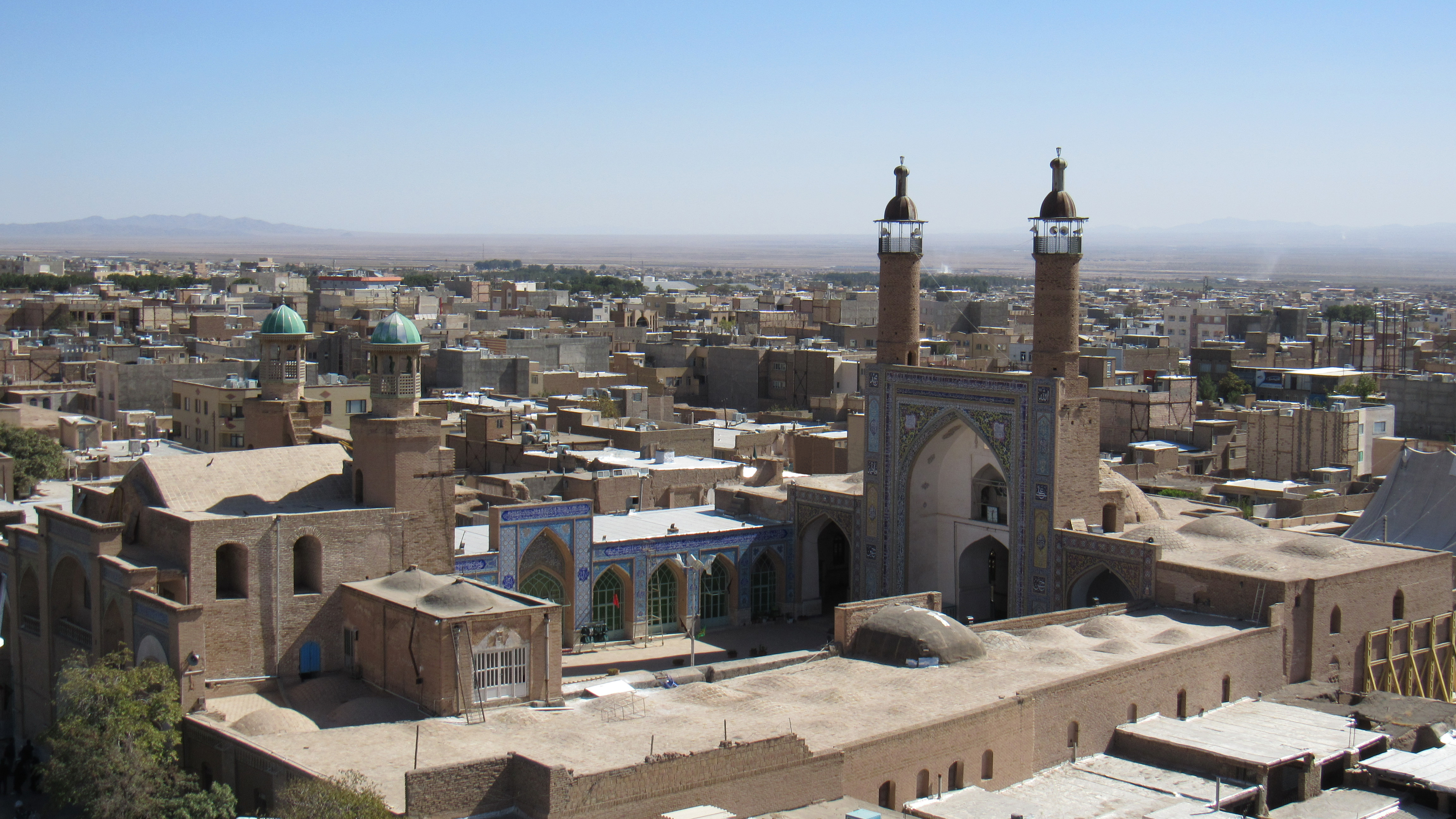
Panoramic view of the mosque, 2016

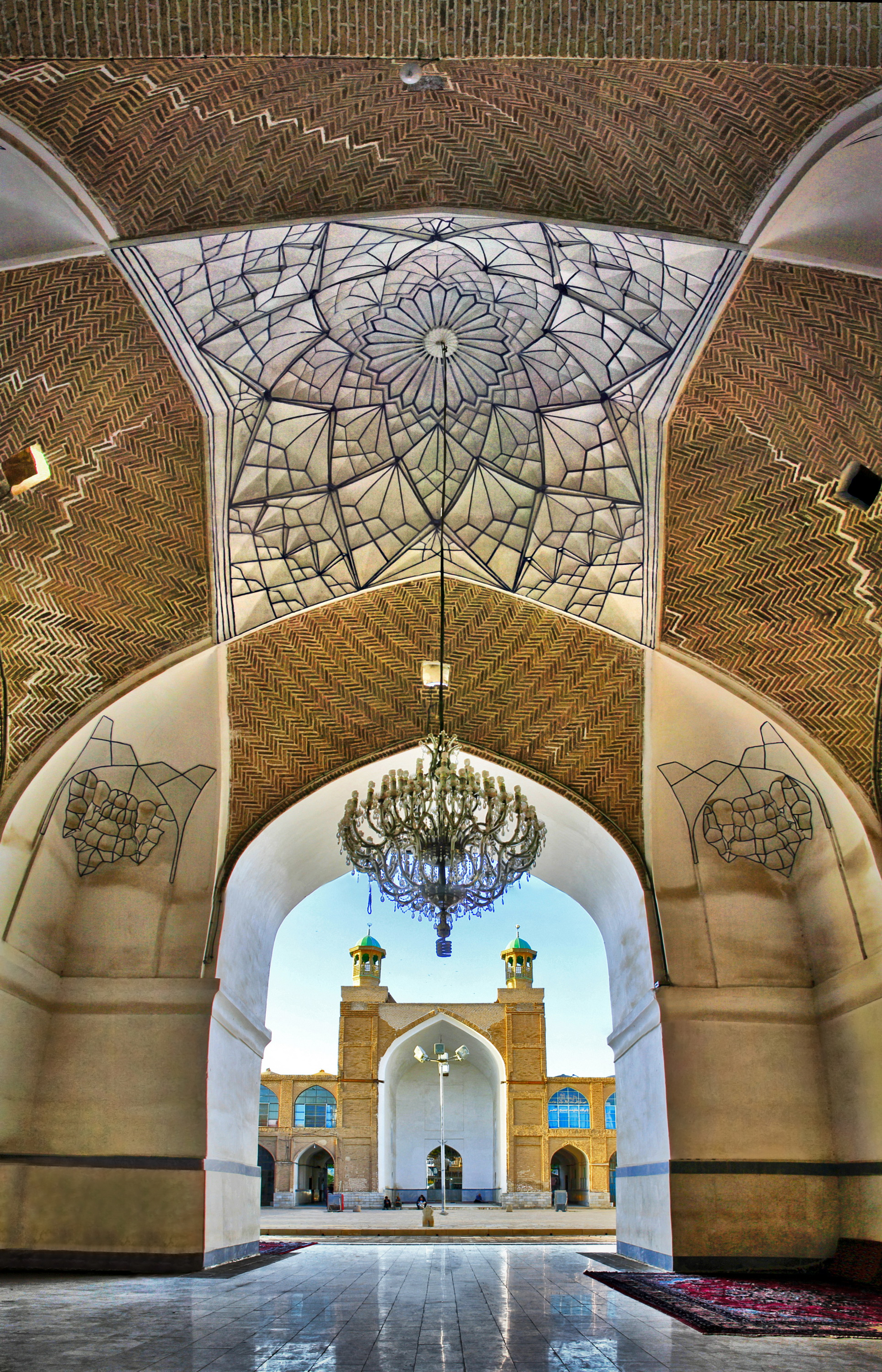
Muqarnas ceilings, 2013

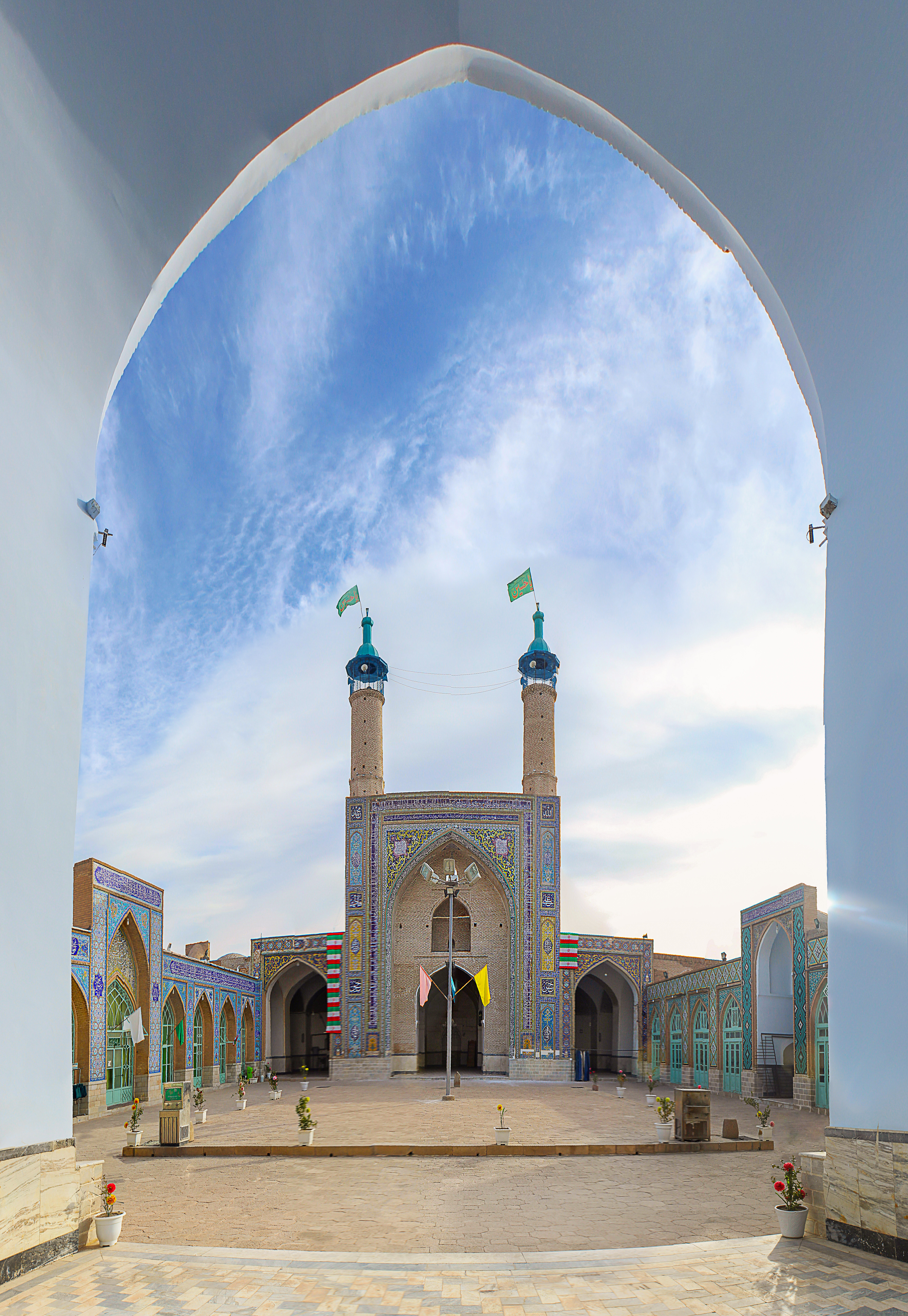
Courtyard of the mosque, 2018

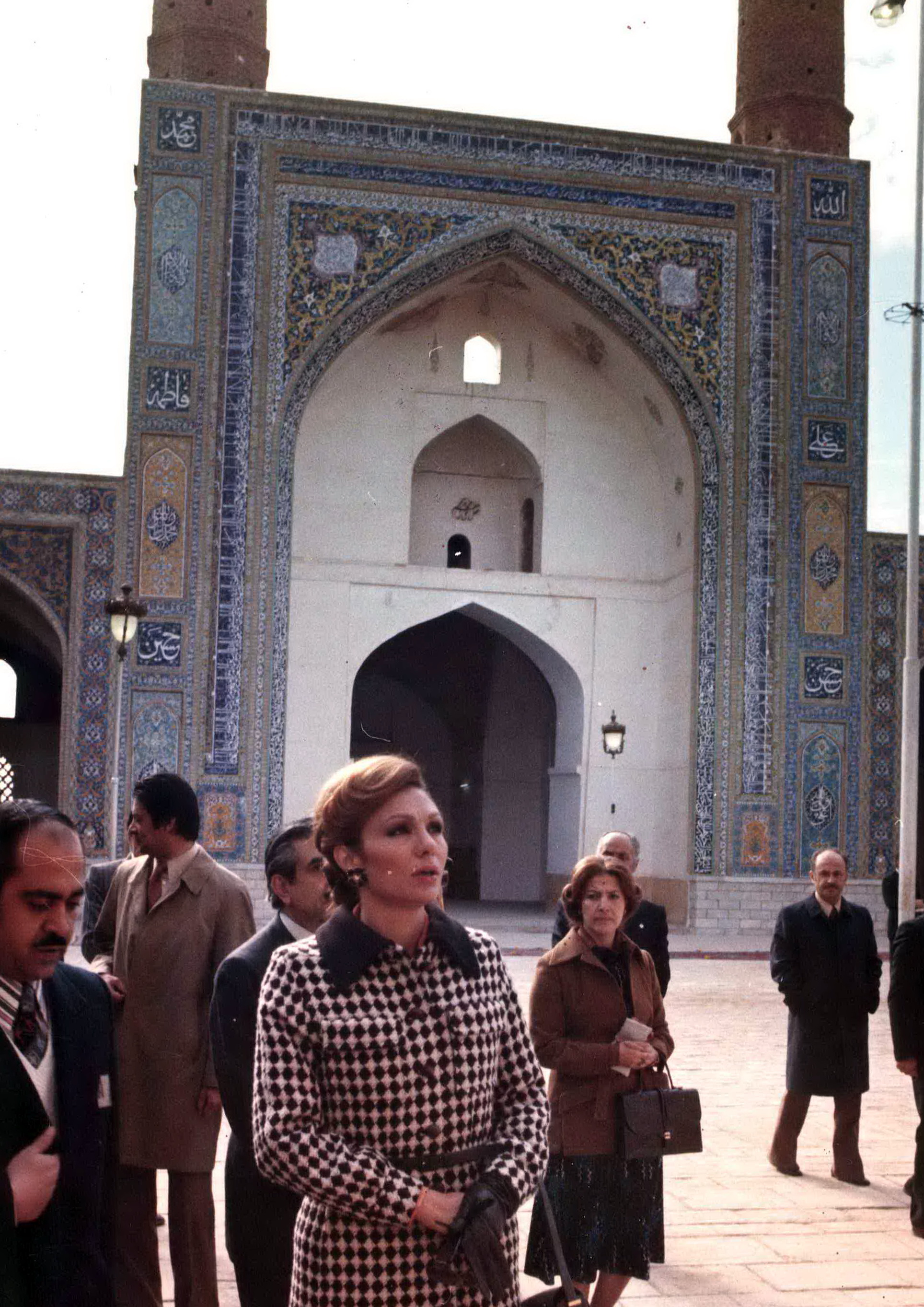
Empress Farah Pahlavi at the mosque, 1974

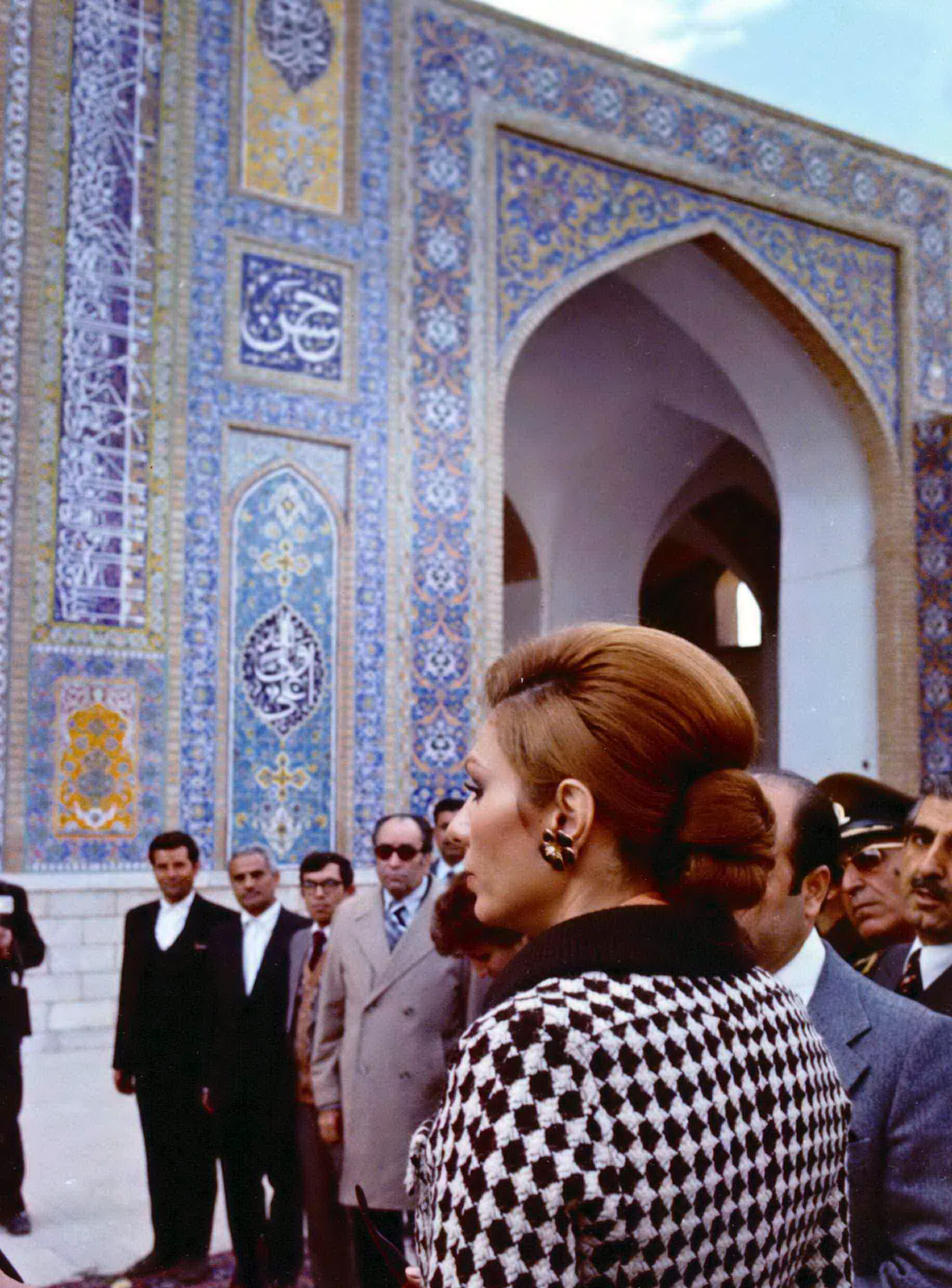
Empress Farah Pahlavi at the mosque, 1974

== See also ==
- Shia Islam in Iran
- List of mosques in Iran
