= Farahnaz Pahlavi =

Iranian princess (born 1963)

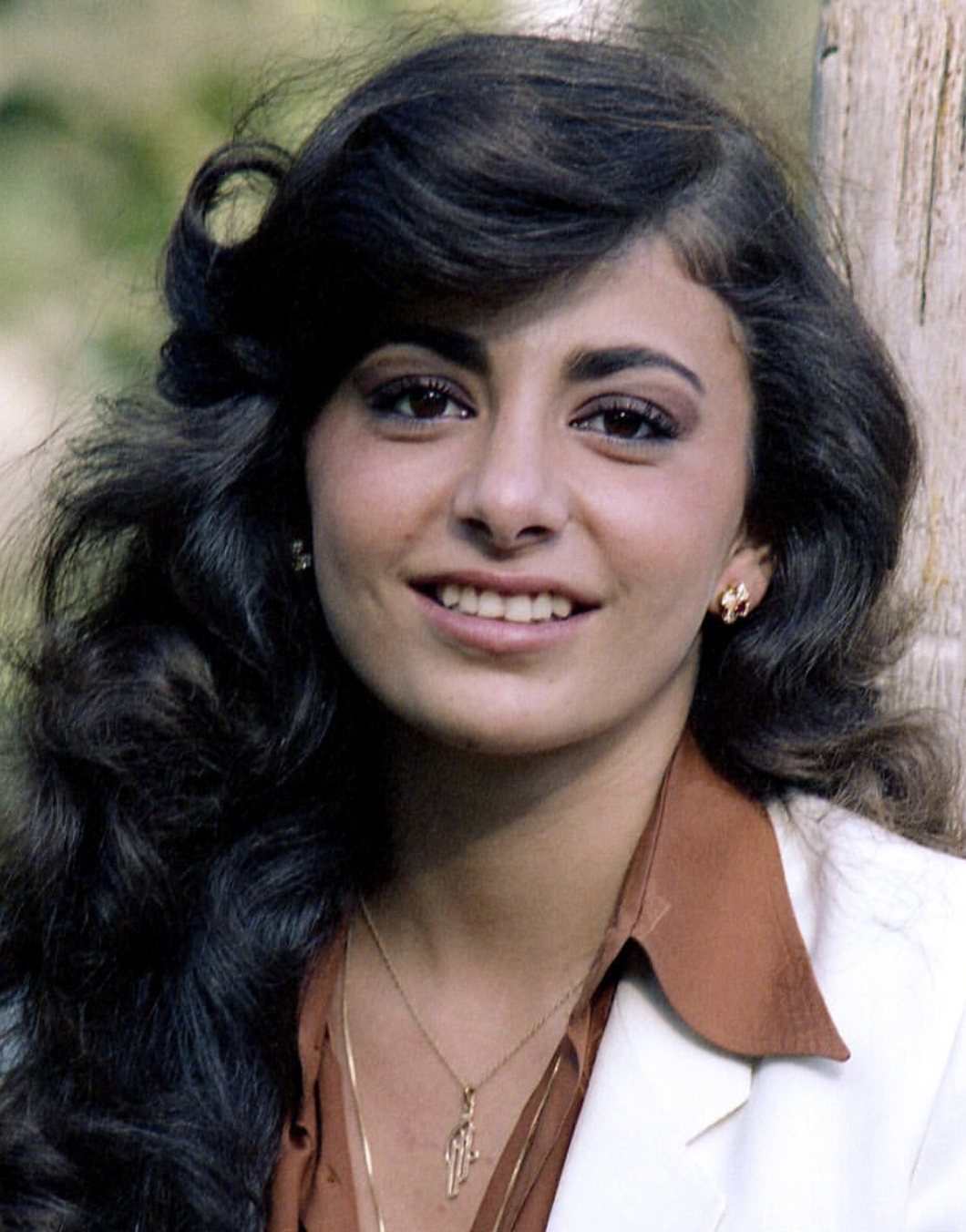
- Farahnaz in 1980
- Born: Masoumeh Pahlavi; 12 March 1963 (age 63); Tehran, Imperial State of Iran
- House: Pahlavi
- Father: Mohammad Reza Pahlavi
- Mother: Farah Diba

Farahnaz Pahlavi (Persian: فرحناز پهلوی; born 12 March 1963) is the daughter of Mohammad Reza Pahlavi, the last Shah of Iran, by his third wife, Empress Farah Pahlavi.

== Education ==
She studied at the Niavaran Special School in Tehran, the Ethel Walker School in Simsbury, Connecticut, United States, and the Cairo American College in Cairo, Egypt. From 1981 to 1982, she attended Bennington College in Bennington, Vermont. She received a Bachelor of Arts in social work from Columbia University in 1986 and a Master's degree in child psychology from the same university in 1990.

According to a 2004 article in the Los Angeles Times, she reportedly attempted to find employment at international aid agencies such as UNICEF, but according to her mother, was rejected because of her name.

== Personal life ==
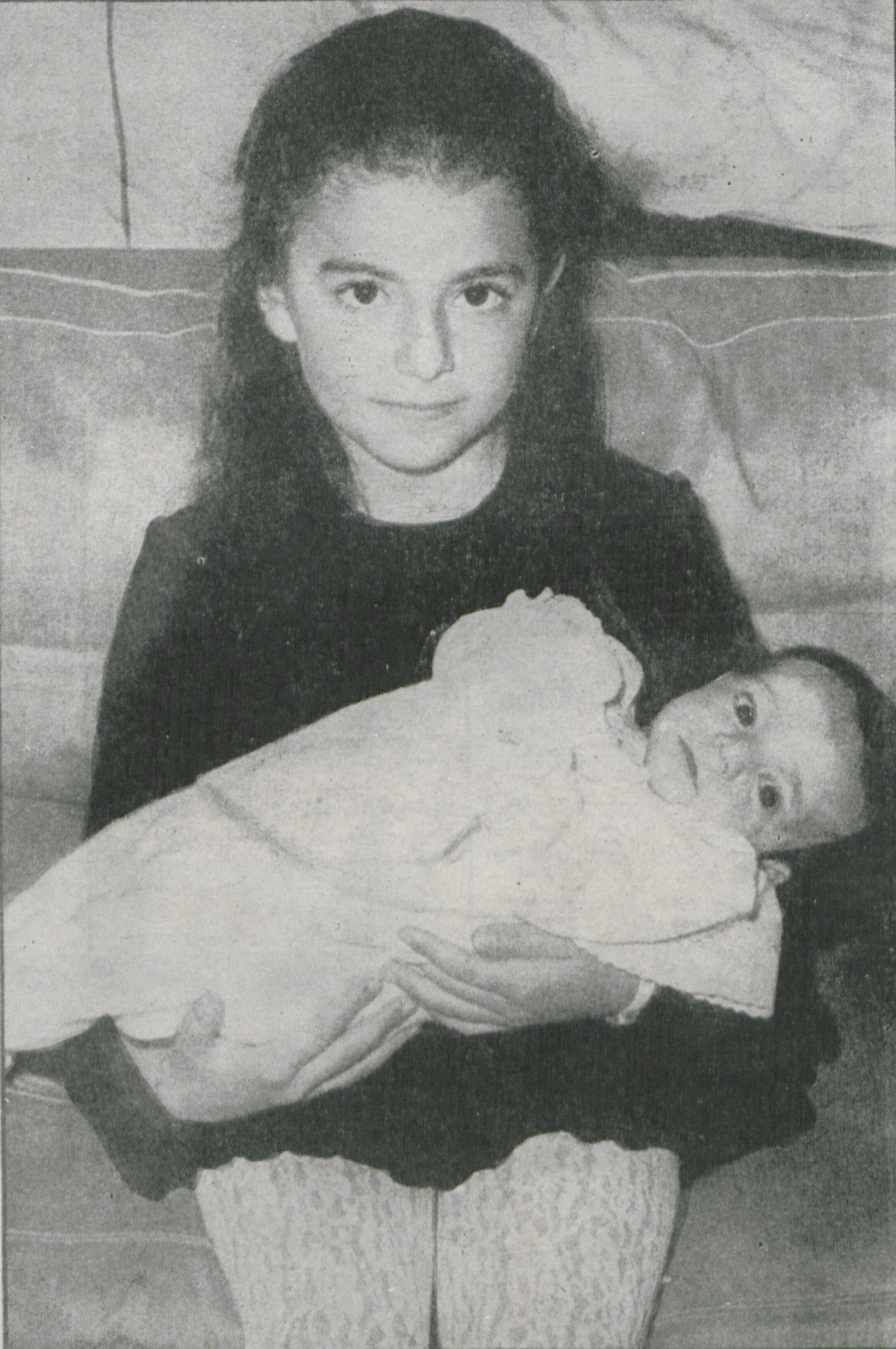
Farahnaz holding newborn princess Leila Pahlavi, 1970

Farahnaz has never married nor had any children. She lives with her family.
