= Death and state funeral of Mohammad Reza Pahlavi =

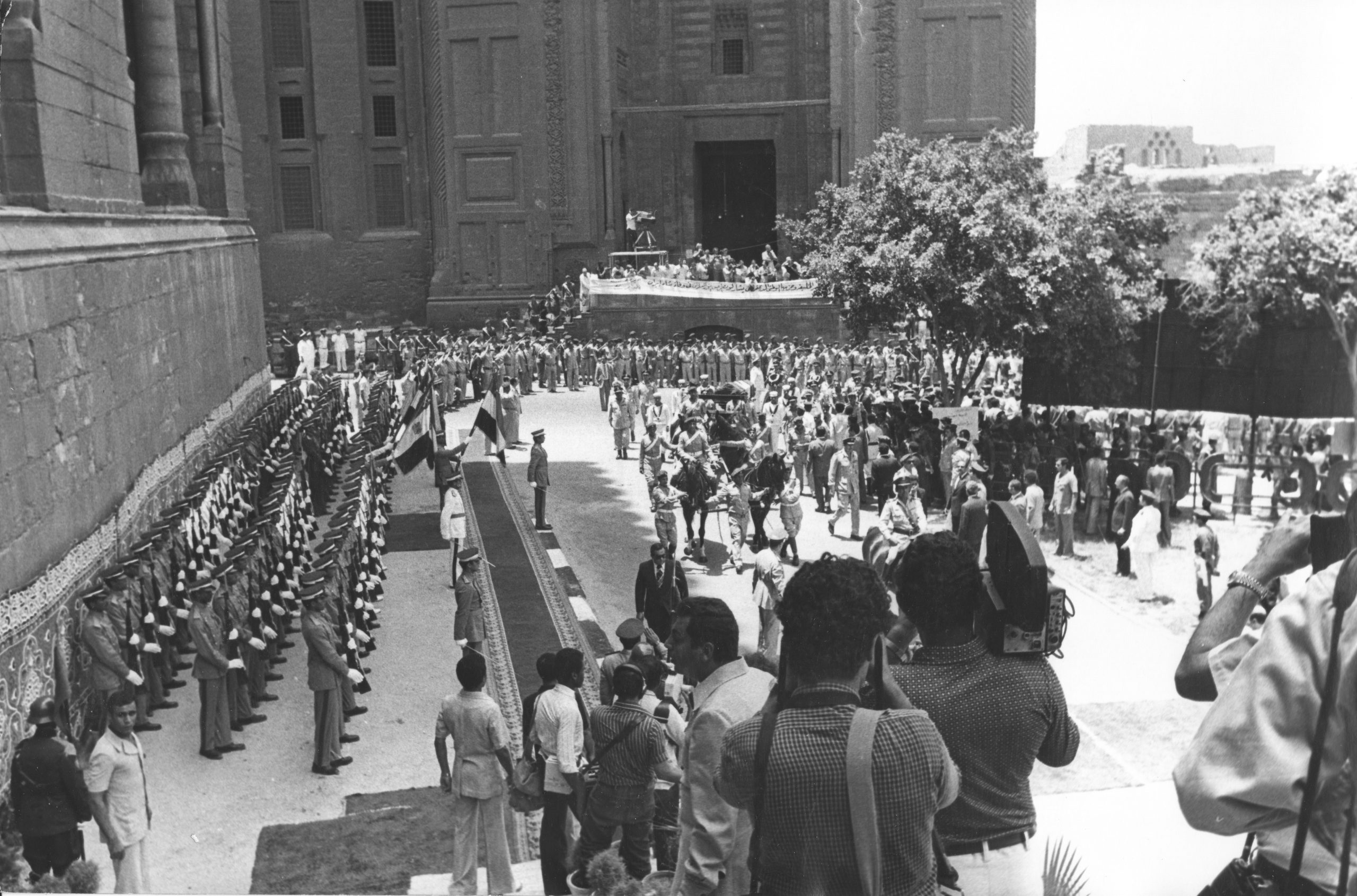
- The funeral procession of Mohammad Reza Pahlavi at Al-Rifa'i Mosque, 30 July 1980
- Date: 09:15, 27 July 1980 (EEST); 30 July 1980 (state funeral)
- Venue: Al-Rifa'i Mosque, Cairo
- Organized by: Government of Egypt
- Participants: Members of the Pahlavi dynasty, foreign delegations, citizens

On 27 July 1980, at 09:15 EEST, Mohammad Reza Pahlavi, the last shah of Iran, died at a military hospital in Cairo, Egypt, at the age of 60. His cause of death was revealed to be that he succumbed to the infections caused by the splenectomy operation. Mohammad Reza Pahlavi was given a state funeral by Egyptian President Anwar Sadat, which was held on 30 July 1980 and he was buried at the Al-Rifa'i Mosque in Cairo.

== Funeral ceremony ==
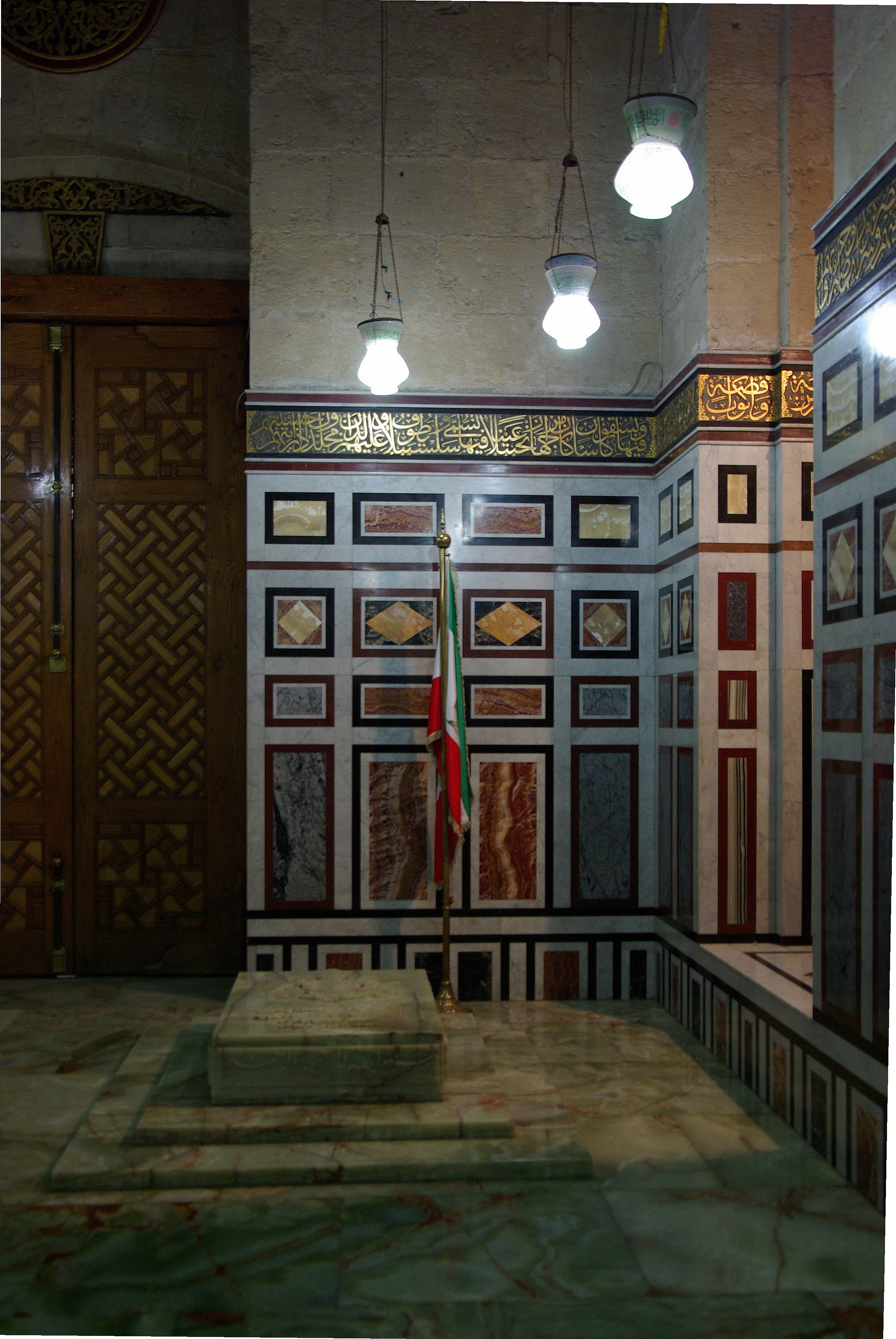
The tomb of Mohammad Reza Pahlavi at the Al-Rifa'i Mosque

Egyptian President Sadat gave the Shah a state funeral. In addition to members of the Pahlavi family, Anwar Sadat, Richard Nixon and Constantine II of Greece attended the funeral ceremony in Cairo.

Mohammad Reza Pahlavi is buried in the Al Rifa'i Mosque in Cairo, a mosque of great symbolic importance. Also buried there are the members of the Muhammad Ali dynasty, the former royal family of Egypt and Sudan. The tombs lie to the left of the entrance. Until 1950, his father and predecessor, Reza Shah, had also initially been buried at the Al-Rifa'i Mosque before his body was moved to the Mausoleum of Reza Shah, which was later destroyed in 1980 under the direction of Sadegh Khalkhali, the head of the Islamic Revolutionary Court.

== Dignitaries ==
- Egypt: Anwar Sadat
- Constantine II of Greece and Queen Anne-Marie of Greece
- Vittorio Emanuele, Prince of Naples
- United States: Richard Nixon
- Moulay Hafid Alaoui, representative of the King of Morocco Hassan II
