= Cairo American College =

Location
- 1 Midan Digla; Maadi; Cairo, Egypt, 11431

Information
- Type: American/International
- Established: 1945
- Grades: PreK3-Kindergarten through Grade 12
- Gender: Co-educational
- Age range: 3 to 18 years
- Enrollment: 960
- Language: English
- Colors: Red, Black, White
- Mascot: Eagle
- Nickname: Screaming Eagles
- Website: http://www.cacegypt.org

Cairo American College (or CAC) is a Pre-K–12 International American School located in Maadi, Cairo, Egypt. It caters mainly to dependents of the local American embassy and other international students. Cairo American College is a not-for-profit institution.

== Curriculum ==
CAC follows "American Education Reaches Out" (AERO) standards. The International Baccalaureate and select Advanced Placement courses are offered within the high school, giving students the option to opt in or out, to suit individual educational needs. Starting in the eleventh grade students may elect to pursue an International Baccalaureate Diploma.

Cairo American College is accredited by the Middle States Association of Colleges and Schools and Council of International Schools. Cairo American College holds membership with Association for the Advancement of International Education (AAIE) and Near East South Asia Council of Overseas Schools (NESA).

== Students ==
The United States Department of State provides direct and indirect support to CAC. However, CAC is not a Department of Defense (DOD) school. Despite this, a significant portion of dependents of the American Embassy attend CAC. As of the 2022-2023 school year, enrollment is 895 (Pre-K.-grade 5: 330; grades 6-8: 229; and grades 9-12: 336). Of the total, 300 are U.S. citizens, 188 are host-country nationals, and 345 are of other nationalities, in total 56 countries are represented at CAC. Of the U.S. enrollment, 123 are dependents of U.S. Government direct-hire or contract employees, and 177 of either U.S. business and foundation employees or other private U.S. citizens. Ninety-eight percent of the school's graduates go on to colleges and universities in the United States or other countries.

== Notable alumni ==
- Farida Osman: Olympic swimmer
- Yousef Al Otaiba: United Arab Emirates Ambassador to the United States
- Steve Kerr: American NBA coach and former player
- Micah Hughes: Founder of the Mango Project
- Jennifer Cate: Executive Director, Hands Along The Nile
- Leila Pahlavi, princess of Iran
