= Leila Pahlavi =

Iranian princess (1970–2001)

- Princess
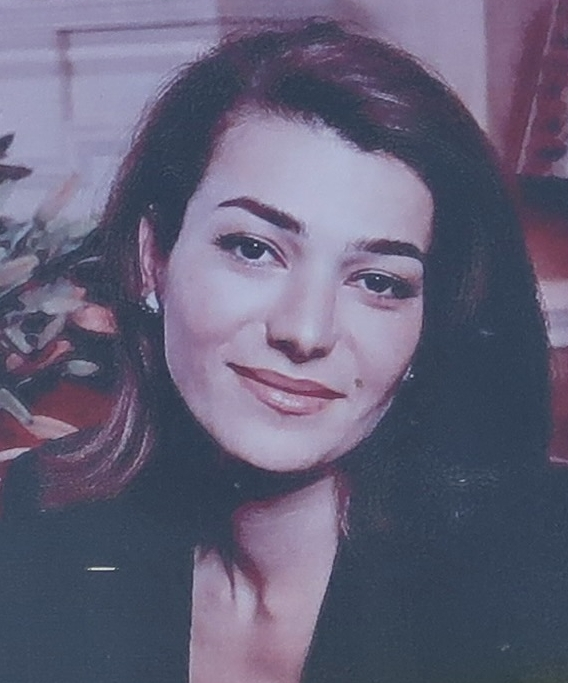
- Princess Leila in the 1990s
- Born: Fatemeh Pahlavi; 27 March 1970; Tehran, Imperial State of Iran
- Died: 10 June 2001 (aged 31); London, England
- Cause of death: Suicide
- Burial: 16 June 2001; Passy Cemetery, Paris, France
- House: Pahlavi
- Father: Mohammad Reza Pahlavi
- Mother: Farah Diba

Leila Pahlavi (Persian: لیلا پهلوی; 27 March 1970 – 10 June 2001) was a princess of Iran. She was the youngest daughter of Mohammad Reza Shah the last Shah of Iran, and his third wife, Shahbanu Farah Pahlavi.

She was nine years old when she and her family were forced into exile as a result of the 1979 Islamic Revolution. She studied literature and philosophy at Brown University. She committed suicide at 31 years of age.

== Early life ==
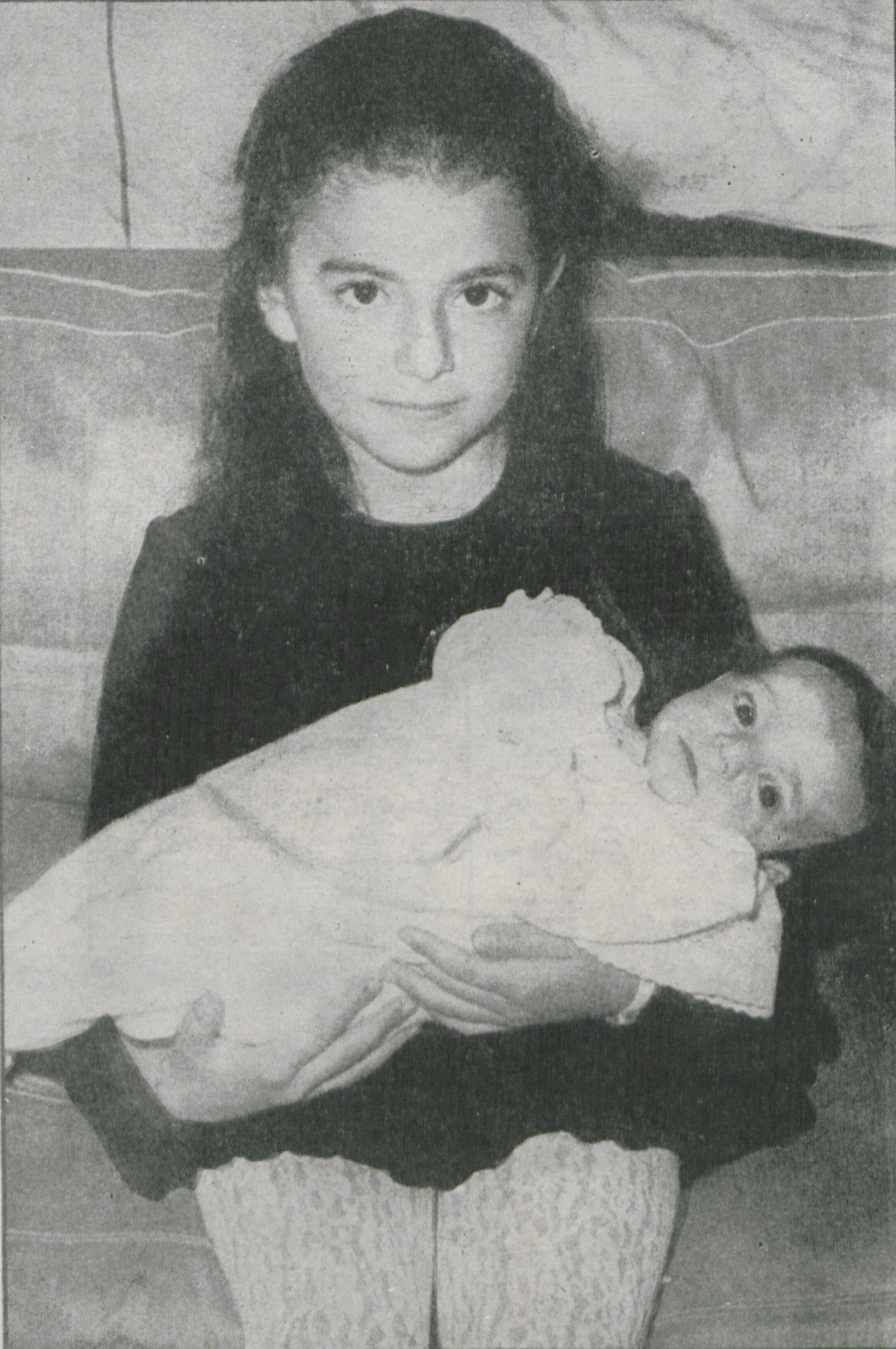
Princess Farahnaz Pahlavi holding newborn Leila, 1970

Leila Pahlavi was born on 27 March 1970 in Tehran, Iran. She was the fourth and youngest child of Mohammad Reza Shah, the last Shah of Iran, and Shahbanu Farah Pahlavi.

She had two elder brothers, an elder sister, and an elder half-sister, and lived in the Niavaran Palace in northern Tehran. She later recalled in an interview: "Even when I was only three years old, he would take me by the hand when he went to meet with foreign dignitaries."

== In exile ==
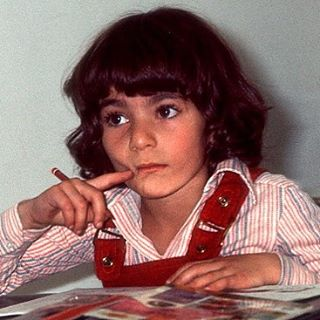
Leila Pahlavi, 1976.

Princess Leila was nine years old when she and her family were forced into exile as a result of the 1979 Islamic Revolution. Under political pressure, she and her family moved from Egypt (where she studied at the K-12 Cairo American College) to Morocco, the Bahamas, Mexico, the United States, and Panama. Her father died in Cairo, Egypt from non-Hodgkin's lymphoma in 1980 when she was ten years old. Thereafter, the family lived in the Koubbeh Palace in Egypt for two years, and then settled in the United States.

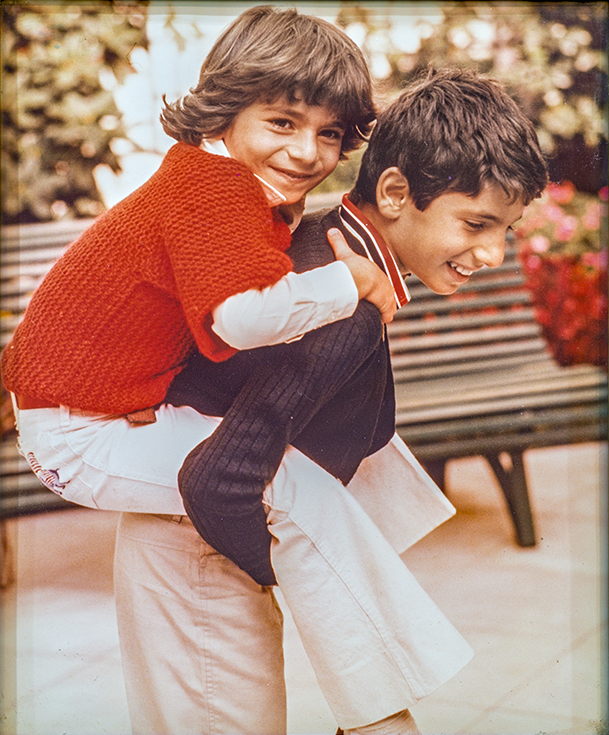
Leila (left) with her elder brother Ali Reza (right) at Niavaran Palace, taken prior to 1979

She attended the Pine Cobble School in Williamstown, Massachusetts, the Marymount School of New York (1979-80) and the United Nations International School in Manhattan in New York City, and later graduated from Rye Country Day School in Rye, New York, in 1988. She spoke Persian, English, and French fluently, as well as some Spanish and Italian. She spent much of her time commuting between her home in Greenwich, Connecticut, and Paris, where her mother lived.

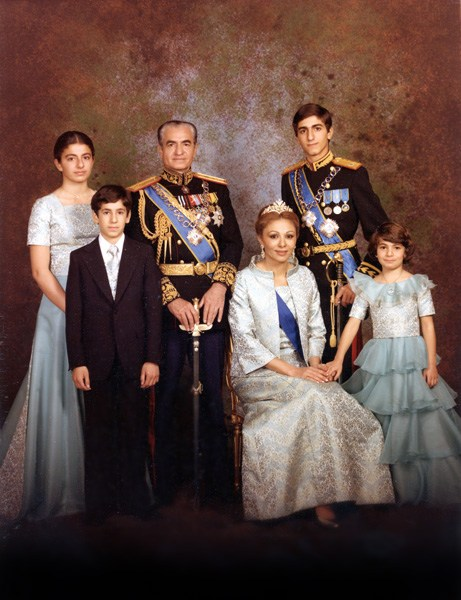
Official family portrait, with Leila on the right, 1978.

Leila Pahlavi studied literature and philosophy at Brown University in Providence, Rhode Island, and was said to have graduated in 1992. However, some sources say she dropped out of university before graduation, due to declining health.

She was a one-time model for the designer Valentino. While living in London, she often went to the nightclub Tramp.

She suffered from anorexia nervosa, bulimia, chronic very low self-esteem, severe depression, and chronic fatigue syndrome.

A year before she died, she said in an interview: "I remain as Iranian as if I'd never left home."

== Death ==
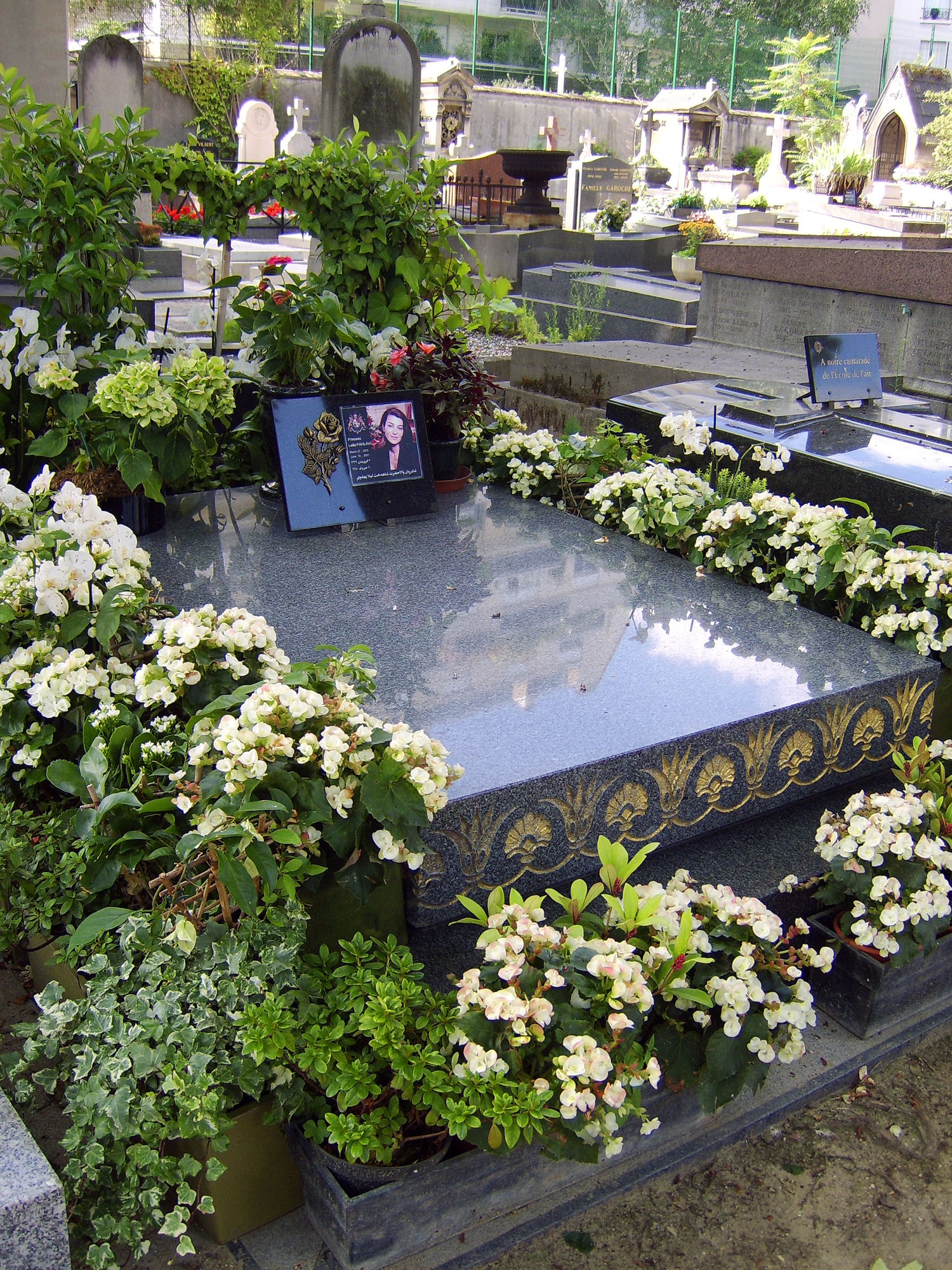
Grave of Leila Pahlavi in Passy Cemetery, Paris, France

On Sunday 10 June 2001, Leila was found dead in her room in the Leonard Hotel in West London just before 19:30 BST by her doctor. She was 31 years of age. She was found to have more than five times the minimum lethal dose of Seconal, a barbiturate used to treat insomnia, in her system (her blood contained a Seconol level of 27.3mg per litre), along with a nonlethal amount of cocaine, the painkiller Palfium, and the sleeping tablet Rohypnol, having committed suicide.

She was found in bed, her body emaciated by years of anorexia, bulimia, and food intolerances. According to a report on her death, which included information from an autopsy conducted by the Westminster Coroner's Court, her doctor--who had prescribed 120 Palfiums and 100 Seconals on each of two separate occasions on 10 and 16 May 2001--said she stole prescriptions from his desk during an appointment. However, her doctor later admitted disciplinary charges that he had repeatedly issued prescriptions for controlled drugs to her without having met her and without having first-hand information about her medical history, which he admitted was "inappropriate, irresponsible and not in the interests of Miss Pahlavi." She was addicted to Seconal, typically taking 40 pills at once, rather than the prescribed two.

On 17 June 2001, she was buried near her maternal grandmother, Farideh Diba (née Ghotbi), in the Cimetière de Passy, Paris, France. Attendees at her funeral included her mother, the former royal family of Iran; as well as members of the former French royal family; and Frederic Mitterrand, the nephew of the late French president François Mitterrand.

=== Aftermath ===
Close family friends say that her brother Ali Reza Pahlavi became very depressed after the death of Leila, to whom he was very close. On 4 January 2011, after a long period of depression, he was found dead at his apartment in Boston, Massachusetts, from a self-inflicted gunshot wound in an apparent suicide.

== See also ==
- List of Iranian women royalty
