= Coronations in Asia =

Coronations in Asia in the strict sense are and historically were rare, as only a few monarchies, primarily in Western Asia, ever adopted the concept that the placement of a crown symbolised the monarch's investiture. Instead, most monarchies in Asia used a form of acclamation or enthronement ceremony, in which the monarch formally ascends to the throne, and may be presented with certain regalia, and may receive homage from his or her subjects. This article covers both coronations and enthronement.

== Coronations by country ==
=== Bhutan ===
Kings of Bhutan are enthroned in a special Buddhist ceremony that involves the offering of various ritual prayers by the new king, the royal family and other notables. The king dons a special diadem known as the "Raven Crown", symbolic not merely of his own authority, but also of the raven-faced protector deity of Bhutan, Legoen Jarog Dongchen. As in neighboring Nepal (prior to 2008), the precise date for the ritual is selected by court astrologers.

=== Brunei ===
The Sultanate of Brunei crowns its ruler in formal ceremony of coronation (istiadat perpuspaan) held in Bandar Seri Begawan, the capital city, wherein a gold crown is given to the new Sultan as well as the dagger Keris Si Naga (The Dragon Dagger), symbolizing his royal authority, as a 21-gun salute is fired by personnel of the Military Police of the Royal Brunei Armed Forces. Following this, senior traditional ministers appointed from the royal family (Wazir) and the principal senior-ranked Cheteria (titled nobles) in the order of precedence, together with male members of the royal family of princely rank, will remove their swords from their scabbards and brandish them before the audience to show loyalty and fidelity to the new Sultan. A proclamation consisting of 7 statements (Puja Puspa) will be read, by the most senior Wazir. The royal musical ensemble (Naubat Diraja) will play Naubat Iskandar after each statement is read, followed by a senior traditional minister shouting to the audience to pay homage to the newly crowned Sultan followed by the acclamation Daulat Kebawah Duli Tuan Patik by the Grand Chamberlain. The coronation is traditionally held one year following the Sultan's ascension.

The last such coronation was held on 1 August 1968, for the present Sultan, Hassanal Bolkiah in the Lapau, or ceremonial hall, having been crowned by his father and immediate predecessor Omar Ali Saifuddien III.

Various items of royal regalia used during the coronation are exhibited at the Royal Regalia Building in the capital city.

=== Cambodia ===
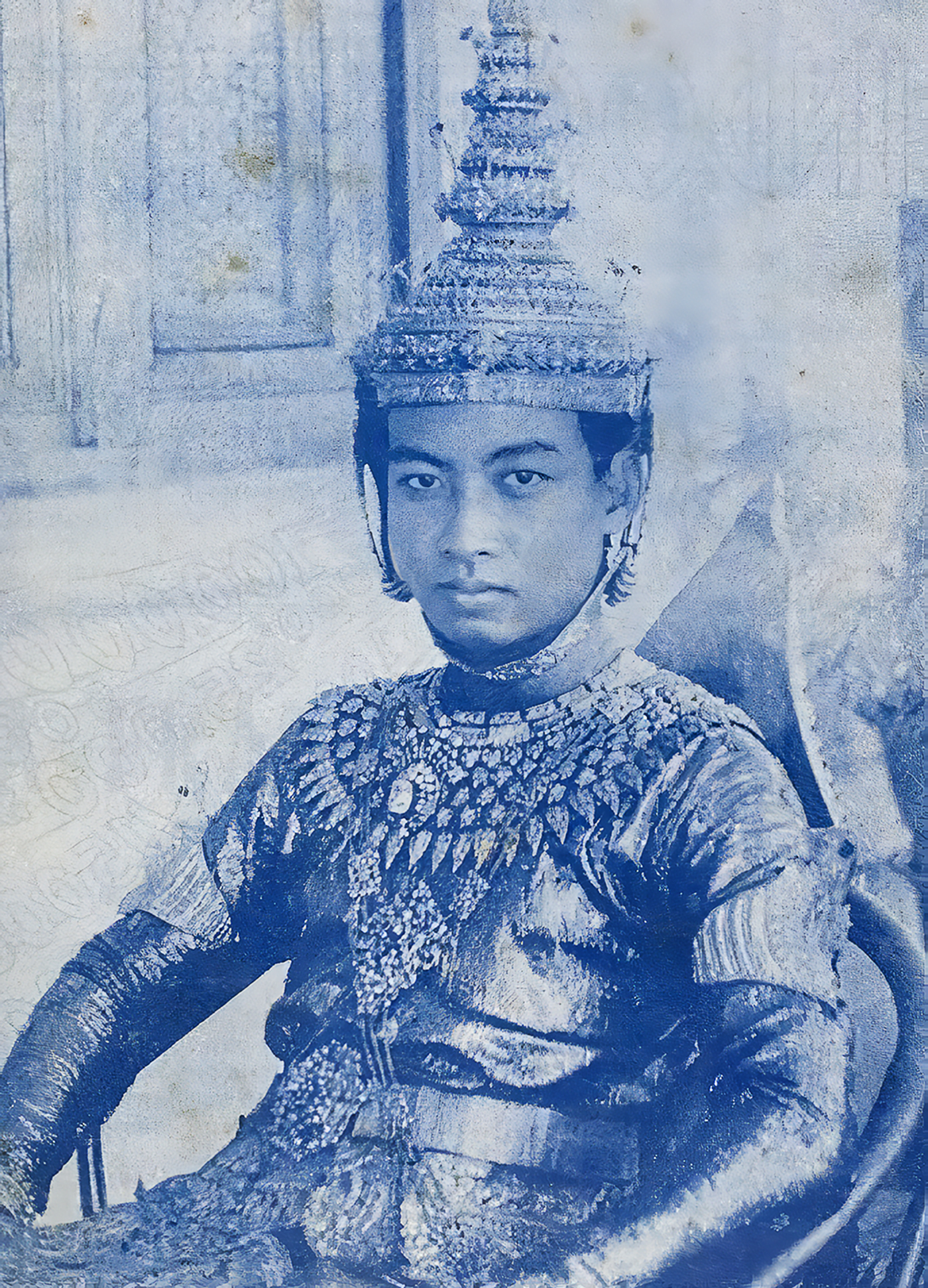
Norodom Sihanouk in coronation regalia, November 1941

The King of Cambodia is crowned in a ceremony that combines Brahmanic and Buddhist elements. The new monarch begins his coronation rite inside the Royal Palace in Phnom Penh by placing two wreaths of jasmine atop a golden pillow. Then, bowing before the offerings, he lights a bundle of incense sticks and placed them around the table before taking a seat on the red-carpeted floor. Prayers are read, punctuated by the sound of conch-shell horns. The ruler then enters the Tevea Venichhay Throne Hall, where he lights a stout candle encased in gold-gilded glass. This candle, which represents victory throughout the king's reign, is left burning until the final day of the coronation festival. Nine Buddhist monks then shower the King with jasmine buds. Finally, the monarch makes his way to the throne, bowing three times to it before retreating to his private area of the palace.

The following day commences with the new king taking a ritual bath in water drawn from the Kulen Mountains, whose water is believed by Cambodian royals to be exceptionally pure. The bath is said to wash away the king's impurities, and increase his prestige. The new monarch is carried into the Preah Thineang Dheva Vinnichay, or Throne Hall, of the Palace on a gold chair, at the head of a large procession. Orange-clad Buddhist monks, one for every year of the king's life plus one, chant blessings. The king prays before statues of his ancestors inside the Hall. While priests blow on conch shells outside, the ruler next takes a formal oath to observe the constitution and to rule in the country's best interests. Following this, he receives various items of the royal regalia, including a calico cat, golden slippers, and the jewel-encrusted gold crown and sword.

The last such ceremony was held in 2004 for the current monarch, Norodom Sihamoni. Unlike some previous Cambodian rulers, Sihamoni chose not to wear the crown during his coronation.

=== Iran ===
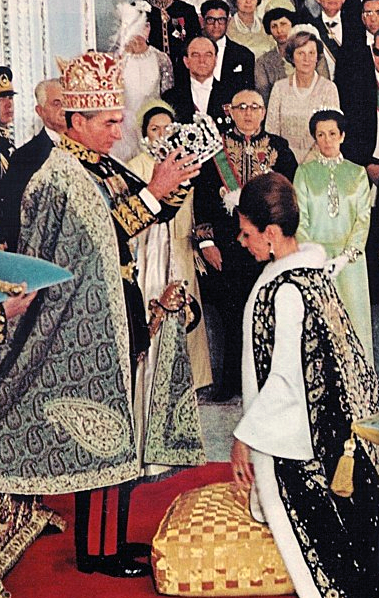
Mohammad Reza Shah crowning his wife, Shahbanu Farah at their coronation ceremony, 1967.

The Shahs of Iran (Persia) crowned themselves in elaborate coronation rituals, the latest of which were staged in Tehran, the capital since 1786. The last of these was the coronation of Mohammad Reza Shah Pahlavi in 1967. The ceremony took place in the Salam Hall of Golestan Palace and commenced with the ceremonial entrance of Crown Prince Reza. Moving past the assembled guests, the prince took his place in front of a throne set to the left of his father's, where he remained standing awaiting the arrival of his parents.

Next, Shahbanu (empress) Farah entered the hall, followed by six maids of honour; these were followed in turn by the Shah, preceded by the heads of the Iranian army, navy, and air force. He took his place in front of the Nadari Throne, where the Shahbanu curtsied to him, while a choir intoned the hymn Avalin Salam. The crowns of the Shah and Shahbanu were brought in next, together with a copy of the Quran; at this, the Shah seated himself on his throne, the entire assembly being seated afterward.

The ceremony itself began with the Imam Djomeh reciting several verses from the Quran and offering a special coronation prayer, following which the Shah kissed the Muslim holy book, representative of his duty as patron and defender of Islam. Following this, various items of the Iranian regalia were brought forward. The Shah first received the Golden Belt, followed by the Imperial Sword and Robe. Finally, the Pahlavi Crown was presented, and the Iranian ruler placed it upon his own head in accordance with Iranian custom, followed by a threefold acclamation of Javid Shah! by the audience and the playing of the Imperial Anthem. Thereafter, the Shah was given the Imperial Sceptre, after which he crowned Shahbanu Farah with the Empress's Crown and listened to three loyal addresses, the first made by a representative of the royal family (usually the Crown Prince). The Shah then offered an address of his own, following which he received the homage of all male members of his family.

=== Jerusalem ===
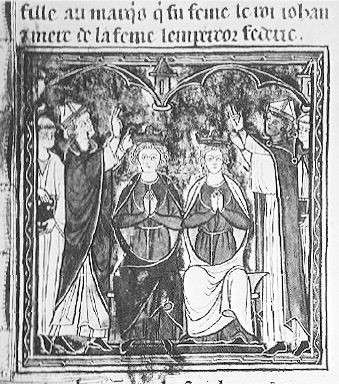
Coronation of Queen Maria and King John I of Jerusalem

The first two Kings of Jerusalem, Baldwin I and Baldwin II, were crowned in the Church of the Nativity in Bethlehem. Between 1131 and 1186, coronations were held in the Church of the Holy Sepulchre. Frederick II, Holy Roman Emperor, was the only king crowned in Jerusalem in the 13th century.

The new monarch was dressed in the palace by the chamberlain. The chamberlain, who bore the royal sword, then headed the procession to the Church in which the coronation ceremony took place. The chamberlain then handed the crown, scepter, and the rest of the regalia to the monarch. The coronation was followed by a feast for the noblemen who attended the ceremony.

The regalia possessed by the Kings of Jerusalem, as well as the coronation ceremony itself, were influenced by those of Byzantine emperors. The coronation of Baldwin I of Constantinople was notably similar to the coronation of the Kings and Queens of Jerusalem.

=== Laos ===
Laos crowned its kings, with the last coronation being that of Sisavang Vong at the Royal Palace on 4 March 1905. These rites included rituals in which the king made a symbolic payment to representatives of his people for their land, with them, in turn, acknowledging his legitimacy. The last King of Laos, Savang Vatthana, was not crowned due to a communist insurgency which led to the abolition of the Laotian monarchy in 1975.

=== Myanmar ===
Kings of Burma were crowned in a way similar to its South-East Asian neighbors. There were huge Hindu and Buddhist influences on the coronations.

=== Nepal ===
Kings of Nepal were crowned in a Hindu ceremony whose date was determined by the court astrologers. Prior to the actual coronation, eight different kinds of clay were ceremonially applied to various parts of his body, and the new king took a ritual bath in holy water. Afterward, he was sprinkled with clarified butter, milk, curd, and honey by representatives of the four traditional Vedic varna ashrama dharma: a Brahman, a warrior, a merchant, and a sudra, a laborer. Only then was he ready to be crowned. At precisely the "right" moment, the royal priest placed a jewel-studded crown (Note: A photo of the last Nepalese king, Gyanendra, in coronation regalia may be seen at Cross-Cultural Studies: Ethnographic Performances in Nepal (May 2004).) on the new king's head. The royals next rode on elephants through the streets of Kathmandu, together with other distinguished guests.

=== Thailand ===
Thailand holds a coronation ceremony for its king upon his accession to the throne. The last such ritual was held on 4 May 2019, upon the accession of the current monarch, Maha Vajiralongkorn. This ceremony included several ancient Buddhist and Brahmanic rites, including the presentation of a nine-tiered umbrella (symbol of royal authority) and other items of the royal regalia to the sovereign. Without this, no Thai king can assume the title of "Phrabat" or use the umbrella.

Vajiralongkorn's coronation began with a ceremonial bath, following which the new king put on the white robes of a Brahmin monk, and had sacred water poured over his shoulders while a "gong of victory" was struck by the court astrologer. Afterward, he received and was anointed from nine pitchers filled with sacred water, drawn from eighteen different sites in Thailand, by a senior Brahmin and representatives of the government and the royal family. The nine-tiered umbrella was then presented, followed by five other items of the royal regalia: the Great Crown of Victory, the Sword of Victory, the Royal Staff, the Whisk of the Tail Hairs of a White Elephant, a Small Flat Fan, and a pair of Golden Slippers. In accordance with Thai tradition, Vajiralongkorn placed the crown upon his own head, then received a special golden Ring of Kingship as a gun salute was fired by artillery.

After this, the new Thai ruler seated himself upon the Bhatarabit Throne at the Grand Palace, where he pronounced the Oath of Accession, promising that he would reign for the benefit and happiness of his people. He also poured ceremonial water to symbolize his complete dedication to his royal responsibilities, in accordance with the "Tenfold Moral Principles of the Sovereign": alms-giving and charity, strict moral standards, self-sacrifice, honesty and integrity, courtesy and kindness, austerity in his habits, harboring no anger or hatred, practicing and promoting non-violence, exuding patience, forbearance and tolerance, and displaying impartiality to all. After this, Vajiralongkorn elevated his wife, Suthida, to be the Queen of Thailand. Finally, the royal couple visited the Temple of the Emerald Buddha where he made a solemn vow to protect the Buddhist religion, followed by a short memorial service.

== Enthronements by country ==
=== China ===
The only monarch in Chinese history to have been formally crowned (Chinese: 加冕; pinyin: jiāmiǎn) was Ying Zheng, who later became the first Emperor of China. Although he had acceded to the throne of Qin at the age of 13 when he reached the age of majority at 22 in 238 BC, he was additionally crowned. The coronation symbolised that he would take charge of the state affairs himself, instead of the regents who had ruled in his name since his accession. However, this coronation did not equate to accession, and no other Chinese monarch was ever "crowned".

Enthronement ceremonies in dynastic China varied throughout the ages. In the Ming and Qing dynasties, the ceremony generally began with the emperor offering prayers to the Heaven, from which, according to the state theology, the emperor derived his mandate to rule. The emperor would then proceed to the main hall of the Forbidden City, where he was ceremonially enthroned on the Dragon Throne. Court officials then entered the throne hall in order of seniority, and offered memorials of congratulation. Finally, the emperor's accession edict would be read out. In later enthronements, the edict would be carried out of the Meridian Gate accompanied by a stately procession, and finally be carried by a litter to the top of the Gate of Heavenly Peace, where it would be read out to subjects in the capital Beijing and representatives of all the peoples of China.

The last widely recognised enthronement ceremony of the Qing dynasty occurred in 1908 with the enthronement of the Puyi. In 1915, Yuan Shikai, then President of the Republic of China, declared his intention to be enthroned as the Emperor of the Empire of China. Yuan had staged a dress rehearsal for the proposed enthronement ceremony, but then the attempt at monarchy was abandoned in the face of overwhelming public opposition. In 1917, Puyi was again enthroned without ceremony during the short-lived Manchu Restoration. Finally, in 1934 Puyi was enthroned as Emperor of Manchukuo, a Japanese-controlled puppet state in northeastern China, which was largely unrecognised internationally and which ceased to exist at the end of World War II in 1945.

=== India ===
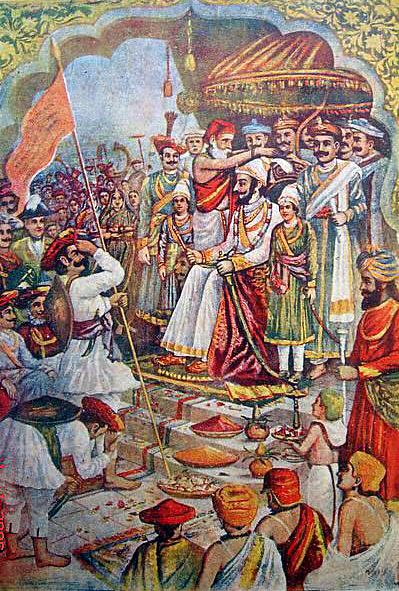
The coronation of Shivaji, founder of the Maratha Empire

In Indian monarchy, the royal enthronement ceremony is called rajyabhishek.

=== Korea ===
The main contents and the procedure of The enthronement ceremony of Goryeo Dynasty were recorded in Goryeosa. The Enthronement Ceremony in which the new king succeeded to the throne was performed soon after the preceding king’s death. At this ceremony, the new king received regalia. and the new king promulgated amnesty. Through the Enthronement Ceremony, the new king got the sovereign power of the king.

The Enthronement Ceremony concluded with performing the rite in the royal ancestral shrine, Tae‒myo(태묘 太廟) or Gyeong‒ryeong‒jeon(경령전 景靈殿). Performing that ceremony, the new king got justness of king’s authority. In Goryeo, also Abhiseka rituals(관정도량 灌頂道場) as the enthronement ceremony were held to increase the new king’s authority. Abhiseka originated from the ancient enthronement ceremony of India. It has been considered to be a very important ceremony to inherit esoteric Buddhism. In Goryeo Abhiseka rituals, the enthronement ceremony appeared to raise the royal authority. Through the enthronement ceremony, the descended kings were just the succession of lineage, also they had to be true rulers. Therefore King of Goryeo should show that he was a deified ruler.

The enthronement ceremony of Joseon Dynasty consists of the Transfer of the State Seal during which the background of the coronation was delivered, the Three Solemn Calls with which royal edicts were promulgated regarding the crowning of a new king, the Three Kowtows performed as an act of congratulation for the new king, the Three Cheers for the longevity of the king and the dynasty, and the Four Ceremonious Bows. The coronation was followed by a celebratory feast and the performance of court music and dances. In the Joseon Dynasty, the new king wore mourning on the sixth day of former king’s death, and then the enthronement ceremony was held. In the early Joseon period, enthronement ceremonies were held at Geunjeongmun, Gyeongbokgung Palace, and in the later period, mainly at Injeongmun, Changdeokgung Palace.

A record of the 1724 coronation of Korean King Yeongjo of the Joseon Dynasty has been preserved. According to this account, Yeongjo began his crowning ritual at noon on 26 October, by entering the funeral chamber where his deceased predecessor, Gyeongjong, lay in state. Having announced to his departed brother that he was assuming the royal mantle, Yeongjo burned incense before his remains, then entered the Injeongjeon Hall, where he was seated upon his throne. In the courtyard below, ranks of servants and bureaucrats bowed to him four times, shouting in unison each time: "Long live the king"! Following this, the new monarch left the throne room and changed back into mourning clothes for the reading of his accession edict. The decree contained the new king's pledge to rule justly and benevolently; it equally promised reductions in criminal sentences, provisions for the needy, and gifts for all of Yeongjo's loyal officials. The edict closed with a plea for help and cooperation throughout the reign to come. The Empire of Korea ended in 1910 with annexation by Japan, with the country subsequently splitting into a communist state (North) and republic (South) after the events of World War II.

=== Japan ===
The enthronement ceremony of Japan consists of three main parts. The first takes place immediately after the death of the preceding sovereign. The new emperor is given two of the Three Sacred Treasures of Japan: (1) a replica sword representing the sword Kusanagi-no-Tsurugi (lit. "Grasscutter Sword") (草薙劍)--the original being enshrined in the Atsuta Shrine in Nagoya; and (2) the Yasakani no magatama (八尺瓊曲玉), a necklace of comma-shaped stone beads. Unlike other monarchies, Japan has no crown for its ruler.

The second part of the ceremony is the enthronement ritual itself, previously held in Kyoto, the former capital of Japan. The most recent enthronement of Emperor Naruhito in 2019 was held in Tokyo instead. The ritual is not public - but is televised, and the regalia is generally seen only by the emperor himself and a few Shinto priests.

The Daijo-sai or the Great Thanksgiving Festival is the final inauguration ritual, involving sacred rice, sake, fish and a variety of other foods from both land and sea that are offered to the Sun-goddess Amaterasu-ōmikami. This ceremony effects a singular union with the goddess, thus making the new emperor (in Shinto tradition) the immediate intermediary between Amaterasu-ōmikami and the Japanese people.

=== Malaysia ===
The nine royal rulers of Malaysia elect one of their number every five years to serve as Yang di-Pertuan Agong, or King of Malaysia. The new ruler is enthroned in a special ceremony six months after his election, which involves usage of several items of regalia including the Tengkolok Diraja, or Royal Headdress—as opposed to a crown. According to legend, the first Sultan of Perak swore off the wearing of any diadems after the miraculous refloating of his ship, which had run aground during his journey to establish his reign in Perak. Hence, while Malaysian coronations are rather elaborate affairs, they do not involve the imposition of a crown. Instead, a special headdress is worn by the new king that since 1957 is in the style of the rulers of the self-electing ruler state of Negeri Sembilan. (However, the states of Selangor and Johor still have their rulers crowned, a later British-influenced addition.)

The new king proceeds into the Istana Negara Throne Hall at the head of a large procession also consisting of his spouse, specially-picked soldiers carrying the royal regalia, and other notables including the Grand Chamberlain, or Datuk Paduka Maharaja Lela. The king and his queen consort are seated upon their thrones, and the regalia are brought forward. Following this, the Grand Chamberlain brings forward a copy of the Qur'an, which the new monarch reverently receives, kisses, and places on a special table located between his throne and the queen's, and afterwards, he is then with presented his ceremonial saber, which he removes it from the scabbard, kisses its sheath, and returns it back to the scabbard and placed near the throne chair. A formal proclamation of the new king's reign is read, followed by the taking of a special coronation oath and the acclamation by the Grand Chamberlain, following which the National Anthem Negaraku is played with a 21-gun salute in the background. The Prime Minister gives a special speech, which is followed by an address by the new king from the throne. A prayer is said, the Qur'an as returned to the Chamberlain, and the ceremony is completed as the new king leaves the throne hall.

== See also ==
- Videos of the Malaysian king's coronation Click on "Installation Ceremony" and scroll to the bottom of that page for the video link.
- Videos of the Enthronement of the Japanese Emperor in 1990

== Notes ==
This section contains expansions on the main text of the article, as well as links provided for context that may not meet Wikipedia standards for reliable sources, due largely to being self-published.
