= Treasury of National Jewels =

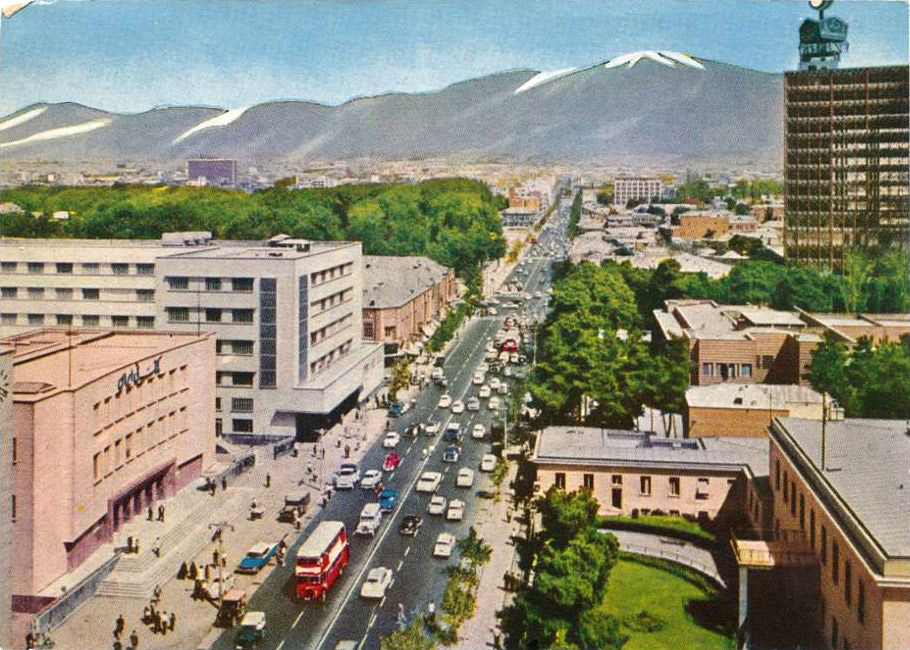
- Treasury of National Jewels in 1962 (white building)
- Former name: Treasury of Royal Jewels
- Established: 1955; 71 years ago
- Location: Ferdowsi Street, Tehran, Iran
- Coordinates: 35°41′21.34″N 51°25′10.83″E
- Type: National history museum
- Key holdings: Iranian National Jewels
- Collections: Safavid; Afsharid; Zand; Qajar; Pahlavi
- Owners: Central Bank of Iran; Bank Melli Iran (1935–1960)
- Public transit access: Saadi; Ferdowsi

The Treasury of National Jewels (Persian: موزه جواهرات ملی) is a museum in Iran. It reopened to public in 1992 after years of being removed from view.

Affiliated with the Central Bank of Iran, it stores and exhibits the Iranian National Jewels as their legal custodian. In the 1930s, the collection grew so valuable that it was used as a reserve for the currency of Iran, and is today considered one of world's famous collections of diamond and other jewels. According to Financial Tribune, "putting a price on the collection would not be possible".

== Collection ==
Some of the items maintained in the museum include the following:

- Samarian spinel (Spinel)
- Nader Shah's Sword
- Naderi Throne
- Sun Throne
- Noor-ul-Ain (Diamond)
- Daria-i-Noor (Diamond)
- Kiani Crown
- Pahlavi Crown
- Empress's Crown
- Golden Belt (Emerald)
