= Iranian National Jewels =

Collection of crown jewels

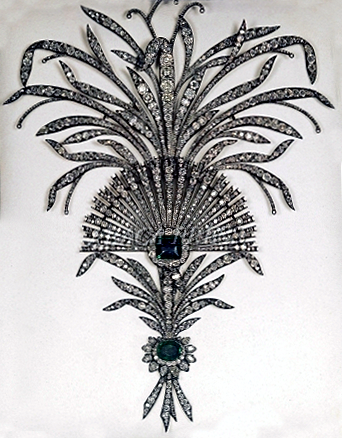
An elaborate diamond and emerald aigrette, set in silver. Part of the Iranian Crown Jewels.

The Iranian National Jewels (Persian: جواهرات ملی ایران, romanized: Javāherāt-e Melli-ye Irān), originally the Iranian Crown Jewels (جواهرات سلطنتی ایران, Javāherāt-e Saltanati-ye Irān), include elaborate crowns, thirty tiaras, and numerous aigrettes, a dozen bejeweled swords and shields, a number of unset precious gems, numerous plates and other dining services cast in precious metals and encrusted with gems, and several other more unusual items (such as a large golden globe with the oceans made of emeralds) collected or worn by the Iranian monarchs from the 16th century (Safavid Iran) and on. The collection is housed at the Treasury of National Jewels, situated inside the Central Bank of Iran on Tehran's Ferdowsi Street.

== Safavid and Afsharid conquests ==
The majority of the items now in the collection were acquired by the Safavid dynasty, which ruled Iran from 1502 to 1736 CE. Afghans invaded Iran in 1719 and sacked the then capital of Isfahan and took the Iranian crown jewels as plunder. By 1729, however, after an internal struggle of nearly a decade, Nader Shah successfully drove the Afghans from Iran. In 1738, the Shah launched his own campaign against the Afghan homeland. After taking and raiding the cities of Kandahar and Kabul as well as several principalities in far-off northern India, and sacking Delhi, the victorious Nader Shah returned to Iran with what remained of the plundered crown jewels as well as several other precious objects now found in the Iranian Treasury. These included diamonds, emeralds, rubies, sapphires, and other precious gemstones. Four of the most prominent acquisitions from this conquest were the Koh-i-Noor and Darya-ye Noor diamonds (both originating from India and still amongst the largest in the world), the Peacock Throne, and the Samarian Spinel.

== Modern use (Pahlavi dynasty–present) ==
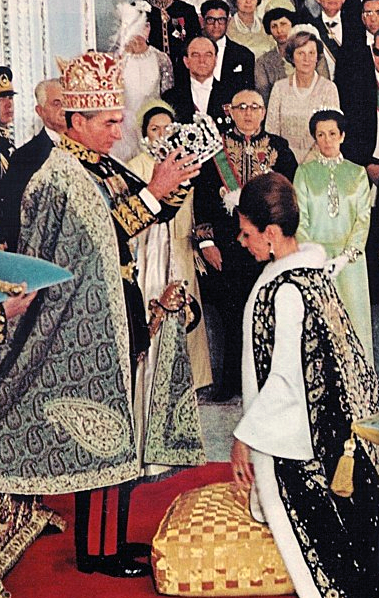
Mohammad Reza Shah crowning his wife, Empress Farah, at their coronation in 1967.

The crown jewels were last used by the Pahlavi dynasty, the last to rule Iran. The splendor of the collection came to the attention of the western world largely through their use by Mohammad Reza Shah and his Shahbanu, Farah Pahlavi, during official ceremonies and state visits.

The Iranian crown jewels are considered so valuable that they are still used as a reserve to back Iranian currency (and have been used this way by several successive governments). In 1937, during the reign of Reza Shah Pahlavi, ownership of the Imperial treasury was transferred to the state. The jewels were placed in the vaults of Bank Melli Iran, where they were used as collateral to strengthen the financial power of the institution and to back the national monetary system. This important economic role is perhaps one reason why these jewels, undeniable symbols of Iran's monarchic past, have been retained by the current Islamic Republic.

=== Public display ===
Because of their great value and economic significance, the Iranian crown jewels were for centuries kept far from public view in the vaults of the Imperial treasury. However, as the first Pahlavi Shah had transferred ownership of the crown jewels to the state, his son, Mohammad Reza Pahlavi, decreed that the most spectacular of the jewels should be put on public display at the Central Bank of Iran.

When the Iranian Revolution toppled the Pahlavi dynasty in 1979, it was feared that in the chaos the Iranian crown jewels had been stolen or sold by the revolutionaries. Although in fact some smaller items were stolen and smuggled across Iran's borders, the bulk of the collection remained intact. This became evident when the revolutionary government under the presidency of Hashemi Rafsanjani re-opened the permanent exhibition of the Iranian crown jewels to the public in the 1990s. They remain on public display.

== The Imperial Collection ==
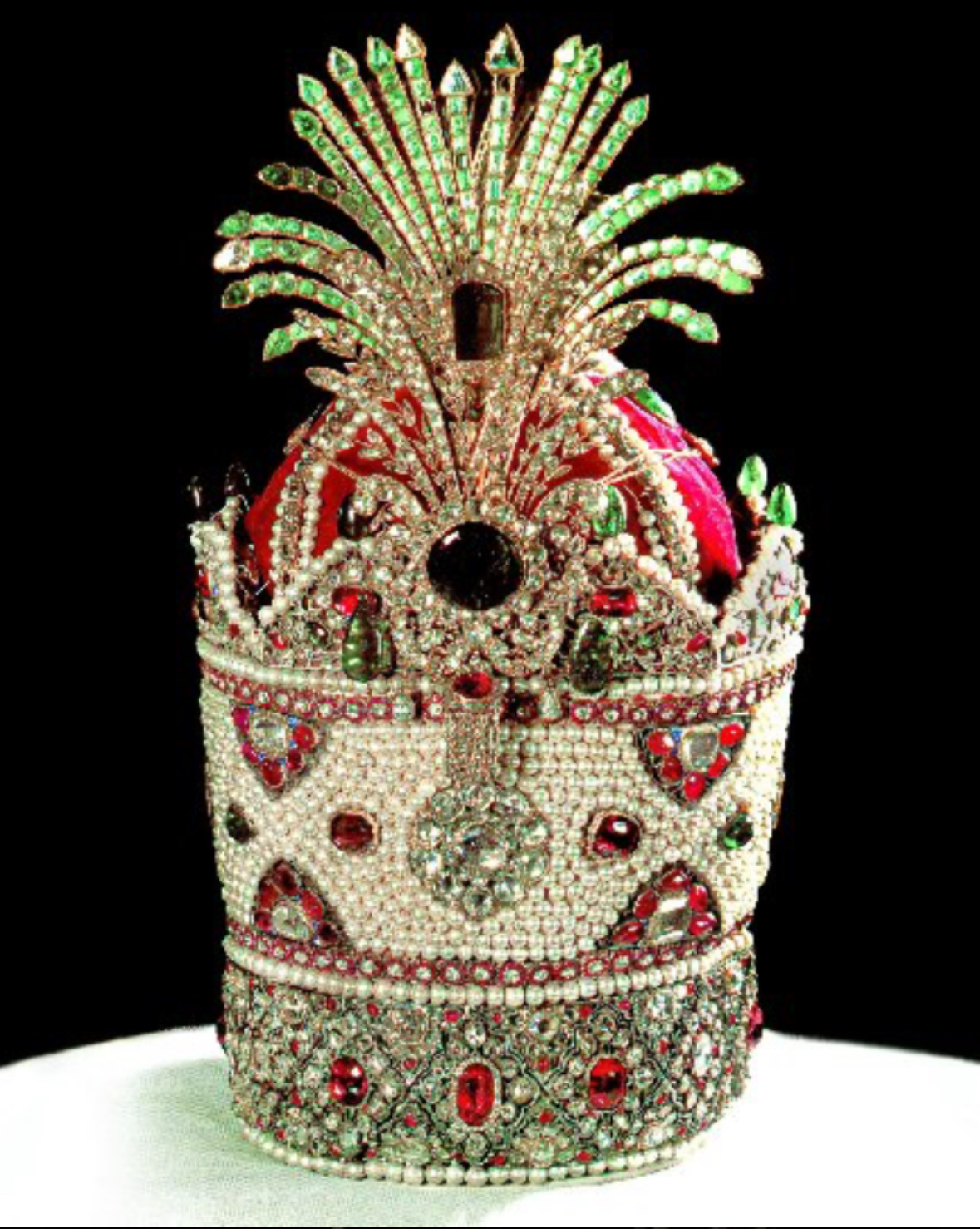
The Kiani Crown

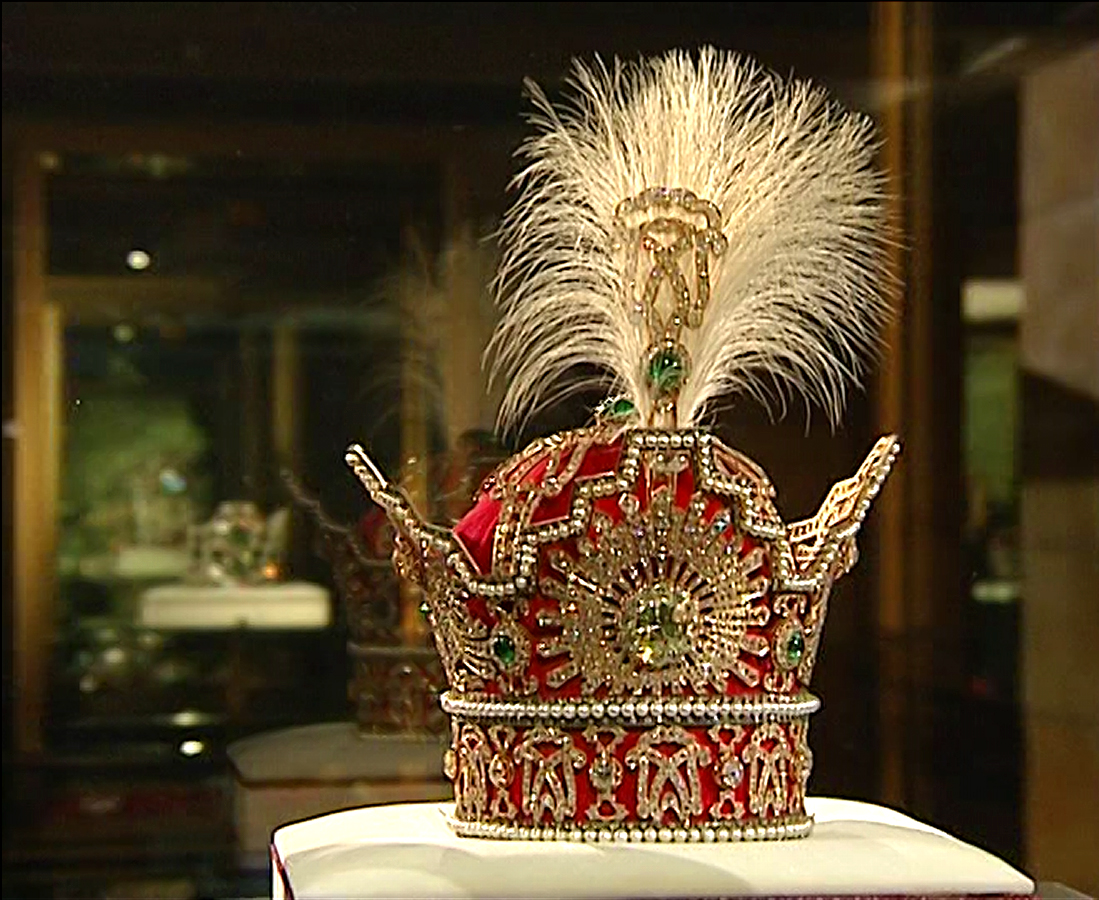
The Pahlavi Crown

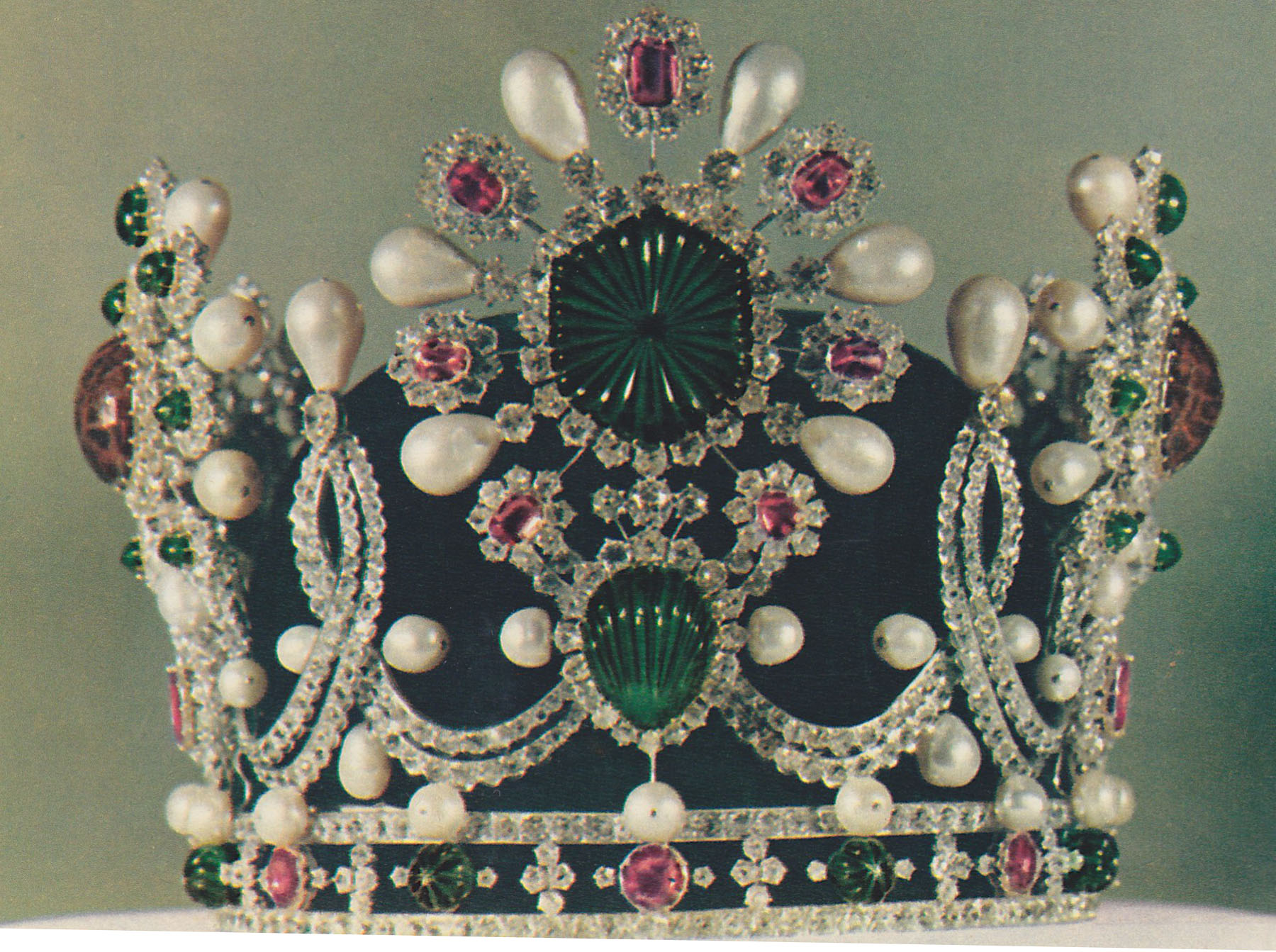
The Empress's Crown

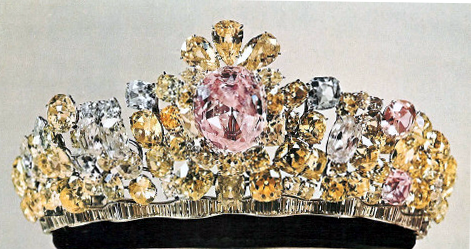
Noor-ul-Ain tiara

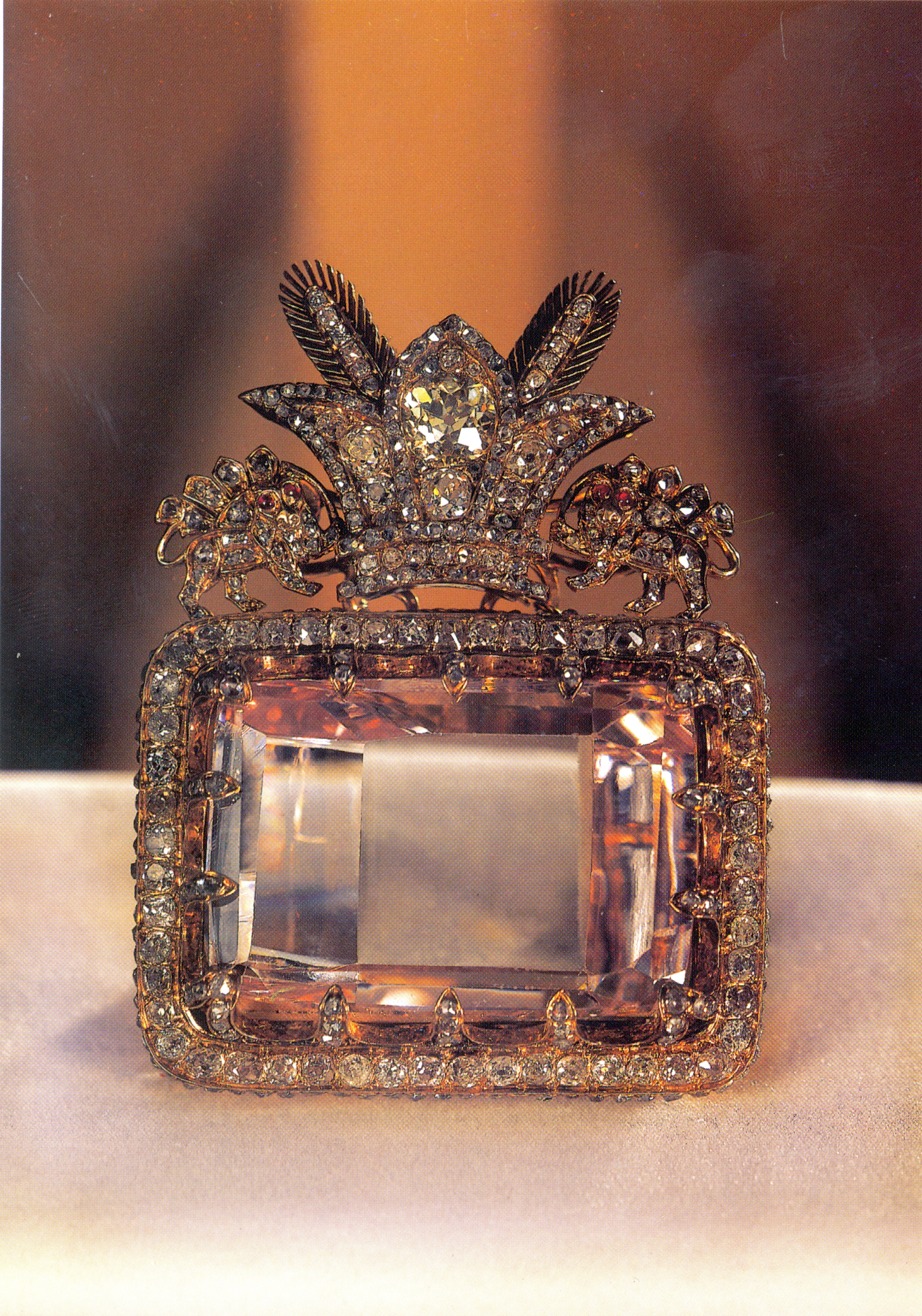
Daria-i-Noor diamond

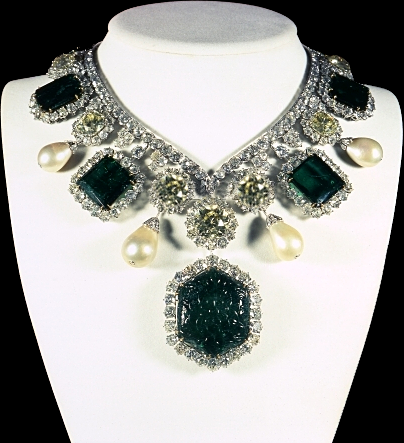
Coronation Necklace

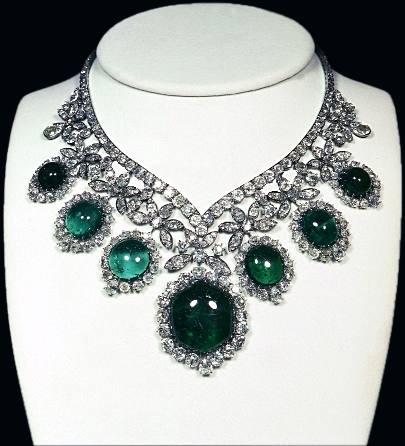
Emerald necklace

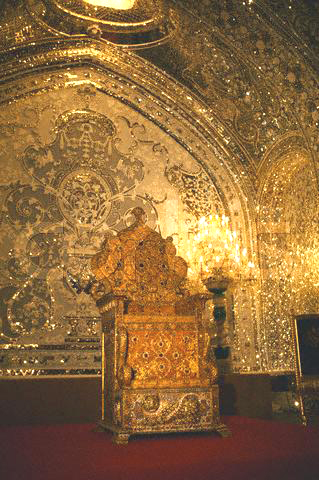
The Naderi Throne

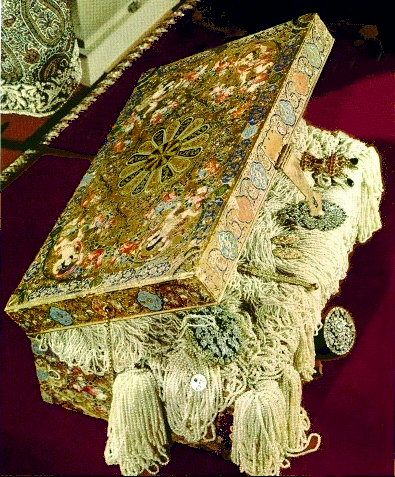
Chest filled with pearls

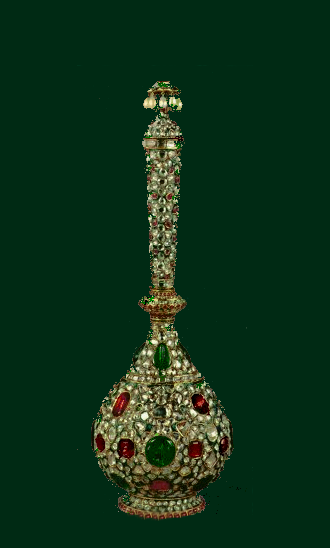
Golden flagon

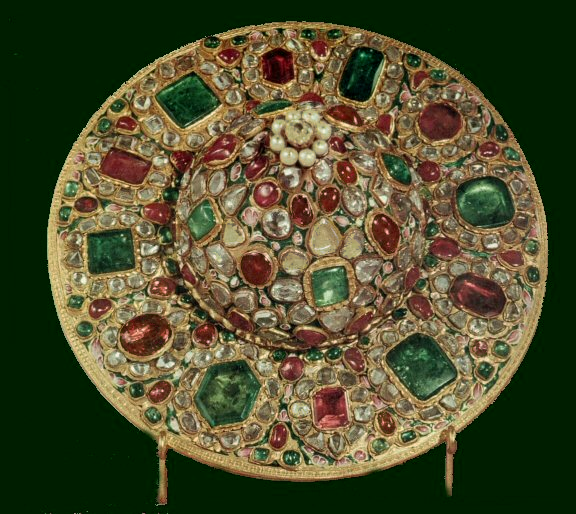
Jeweled dish cover

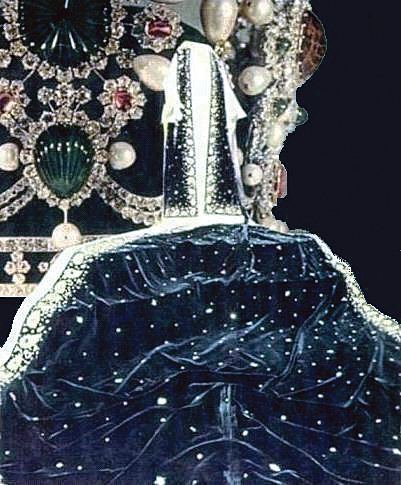
Coronation Cape

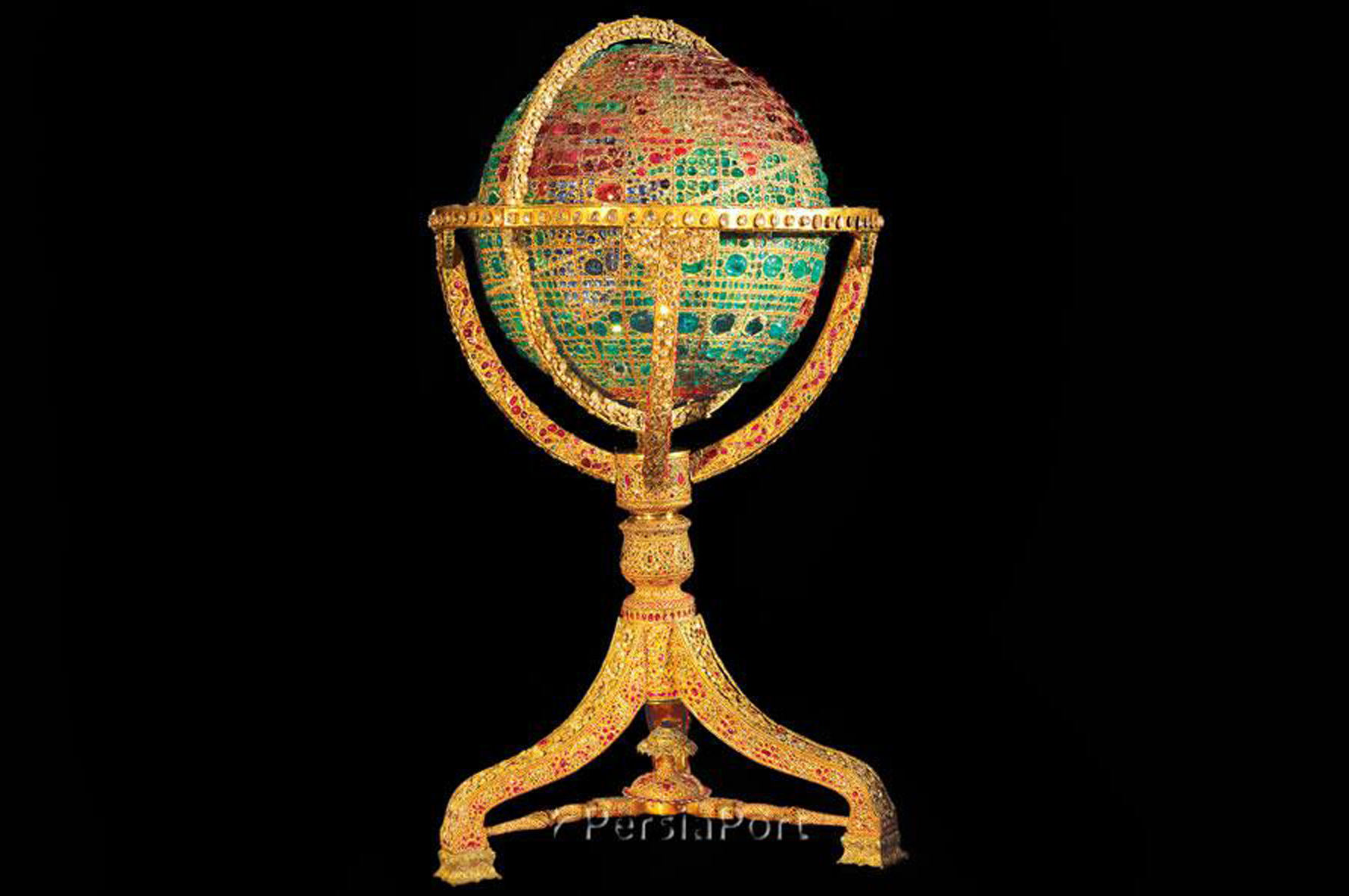
The Jeweled Globe

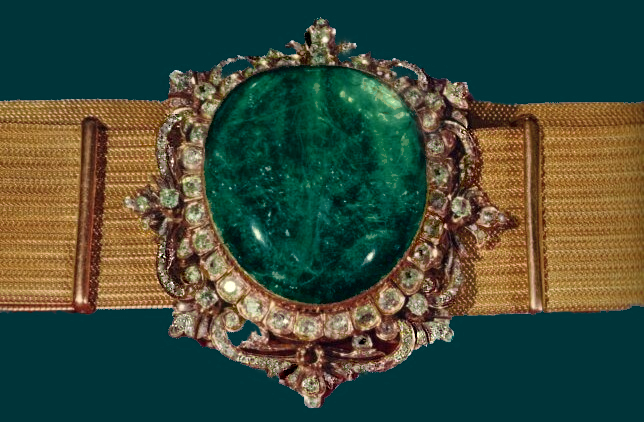
The Golden Belt
(Shah's Coronation Belt)

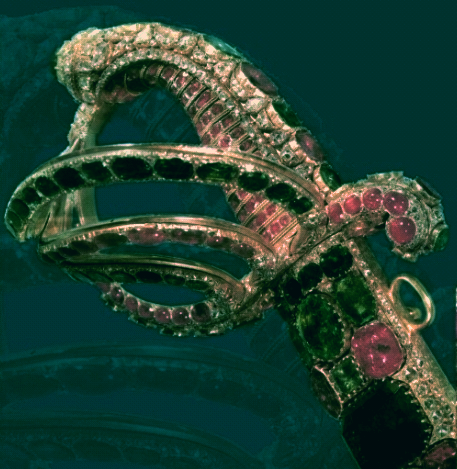
The Imperial Sword

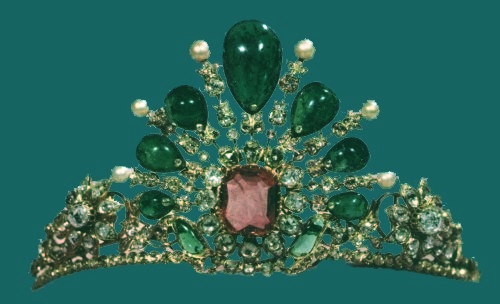
The tiara of Princess Fatemeh

=== The Royal Mace of Iran ===
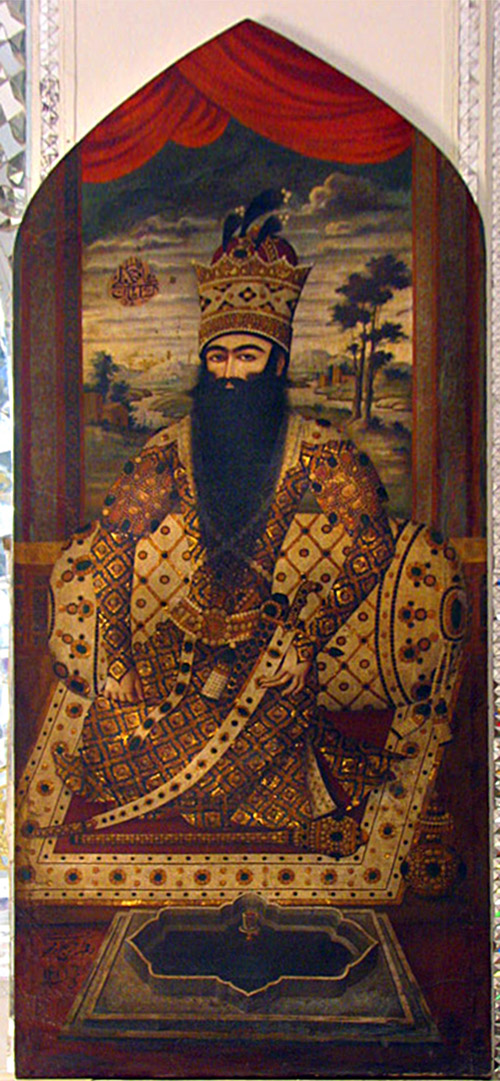
Fath-Ali Shah Qajar with the Royal Mace of Iran at his knees

The Royal Mace of Iran is a jewel-encrusted ceremonial mace, a part of the Iranian Crown Jewels. It was a favorite of Fath-Ali Shah Qajar, who is often shown holding it in his miniature portraits. The mace is encrusted with spinels and diamonds, from end to end. It is 73 cm (2.4 ft) long. The largest diamond weighs 17 carats (3.4 g), and is located on the very top of the mace. The largest spinels are the six surrounding the top of the mace, each weighing 40 carats (8 g).

=== Other items ===
- Princess Ashraf's Ruby Tiara
- Empress Farah's Emerald Tiara
- The Sword of Fath-Ali Shah Qajar
- The Great Globe
- The Sun Throne
- Nader Shah's Sword
- Shield of Nader Shah

== See also ==
- Crown jewels
- Treasury of National Jewels
- National Museum of Iran
- Saltmen
- Culture of Iran
- History of Iran
- Tourism in Iran
- Geography of Iran
- International rankings of Iran
- Category:Iranian National Jewels
