= Coronation of Mohammad Reza Pahlavi =

1967 coronation in Iran

Coronation of Mohammad Reza and Farah Pahlavi
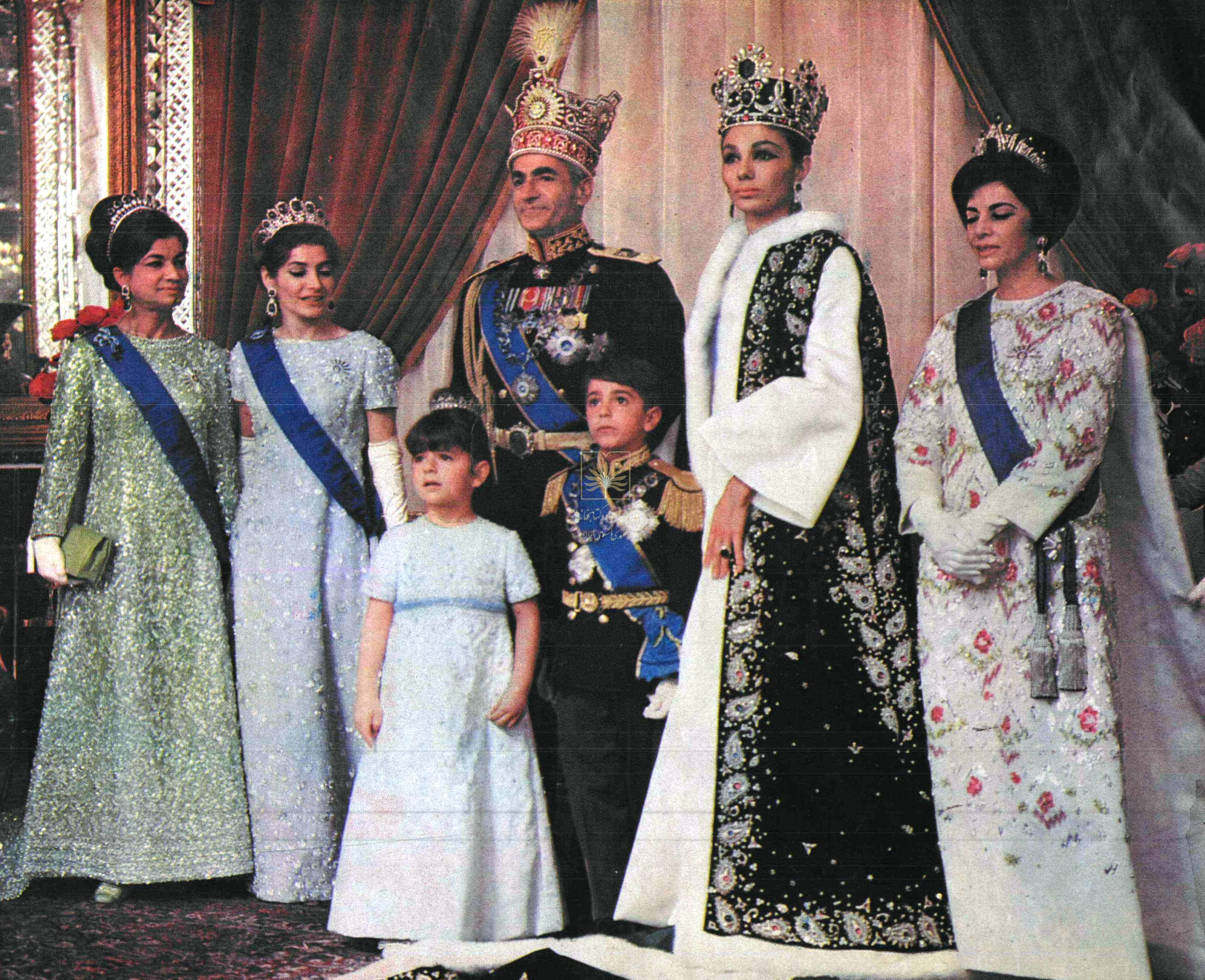
- Coronation portrait of the Shah, Shahbanu and their family
- Native name: Persian: تاج‌گذاری محمدرضا پهلوی, romanized: Tâj Gozâri-ye Mohammad Rezâ Pahlavi
- Date: 26 October 1967; 58 years ago
- Venue: Salam Hall, Golestan Palace
- Location: Tehran, Iran
- Organized by: Government of Iran
- Participants: Mohammad Reza Pahlavi; Farah Pahlavi; Members of the Pahlavi dynasty; Ministry of the Royal Court; Public officials

The coronation of Mohammad Reza Pahlavi and Farah Pahlavi, the shah and shahbanu of Iran, took place on 26 October 1967, the Shah's 48th birthday, in the Salam Hall of the Golestan Palace. Mohammad Reza Pahlavi placed the Pahlavi Crown on himself and crowned his wife Farah, who became the first and only woman to be crowned as the empress consort of Iran. It was the last Iranian coronation to take place before the abolition of the monarchy in the 1979 Iranian Revolution.

Following Reza Shah's abdication after the Anglo-Soviet invasion in 1941, when Mohammad Reza Pahlavi took the oath of office in the National Consultative Assembly and became the Shah of Iran, the original coronation ceremony was postponed at the request of Mohammad Reza Pahlavi himself. This meant that the coronation ceremony of Mohammad Reza Pahlavi took place 26 years after the beginning of his reign.

The imperial crowns, part of the Iranian National Jewels, are currently on display in the Treasury of National Jewels.

== Coronation ceremony ==
On 26 October 1967, the 48th anniversary of Mohammad Reza Pahlavi's birth, the Shah crowned himself and his wife Farah in the Salam Hall of the Golestan Palace. After the coronation, he appointed his wife as regent ahead of his son if the Shah's reign ended.

Before the Shah crowned Farah Pahlavi, the Shah said:

"I thank God for giving me the opportunity to serve my country and people to the best of my ability. I ask God to grant me the strength to continue what I have done so far. The honour and pride of my nation and country is the only goal of my life. I have only one hope, and that is to preserve the independence, sovereignty of Iran, and the progress of the Iranian people, and to achieve this goal, I am ready to sacrifice my life if necessary. May the Almighty God give me the opportunity to hand over a happy country and a prosperous society to future generations, and may my son, the Crown Prince, also succeed in carrying out this heavy burden under the care of the Almighty."

It commenced with the ceremonial entrance of Crown Prince Reza. Moving past the assembled guests, the prince took his place in front of a throne set to the left of his father's, where he remained standing awaiting the arrival of his parents.

Next, Shahbanu Farah entered the hall, followed by six maids of honour; these were followed in turn by the Shah, preceded by the heads of the Iranian army, navy, and air force. He took his place in front of the Nadari Throne, where the Shahbanu curtsied to him, while a choir intoned the hymn Avalin Salam. The crowns of the Shah and Shahbanu were brought in next, together with a copy of the Quran; at this, the Shah seated himself on his throne, the entire assembly being seated afterward.

The ceremony itself began with Tehran's Friday Prayer Imam, Hassan Emami, reciting several verses from the Quran and offering a special coronation prayer, following which the Shah kissed the Quran, representative of his duty as patron and defender of Islam. Following this, various items of the Iranian regalia were brought forward. The Shah first received the Golden Belt, followed by the Imperial Sword and Robe. Finally, the Pahlavi Crown was presented, and the Iranian ruler placed it upon his own head in accordance with Iranian custom, followed by a threefold acclamation of Javid Shah! by the audience and the playing of the Imperial Anthem. Thereafter, the Shah was given the Imperial Sceptre, after which he crowned Shahbanu Farah with the Empress's Crown and listened to three loyal addresses, the first made by a representative of the royal family (usually the Crown Prince). The Shah then offered an address of his own, following which he received the homage of all male members of his family.

== Constitution amendments ==
Mohammad Reza Pahlavi requested a change in the constitution to give him the right to appoint the regent of Iran, to make the legal age for the crown prince to ascend to the throne twenty, and to keep the regent at the head of the country until the crown prince reached the age of twenty. On 1 September 1961, the aforementioned changes to the constitution were ratified.

The Shah said quote:

"When the basic needs of the Iranian people are met and the framework of the Iranian economy is expanded, we must set foot on the path to Great Civilization, and these changes to the constitution will pave our way toward great civilization."

== Attendees ==
=== Direct participants ===
- (Pahlavi Iran) Shahanshah Mohammad Reza Pahlavi
- (Pahlavi Iran) Shahbanu Farah Pahlavi
- (Pahlavi Iran) Crown Prince Reza Pahlavi

=== Observers ===
- Princess Shahnaz Pahlavi, eldest daughter of the Shah
- Princess Shams Pahlavi, elder sister of the Shah
- Princess Ashraf Pahlavi, twin sister of the Shah
- Princess Farahnaz Pahlavi, daughter of the Shah and Shahbanu
- Morteza Yazdanpanah, former chief-of-staff for the Imperial Iranian army
- Amir-Abbas Hoveyda, prime minister of Iran

== Reactions ==
The coronation took place seven months after the death of Mohammad Mossadegh, the prime minister of Iran from 1951 until he deposed in the 1953 coup d'état. Mohammad Reza Shafi'i Kadkani had written "Requiem for the Tree" for Mossadegh's death, which was published in the magazine Sokhan in May 1967. At the same time as the coronation, the allegorical play of heritage and the banquet of Bahram Beyzai's work, which depicted the situation in Iran in allegorical figures such as "Sheban" and "Dehbashi", was staged in the 16th of Shahrivar Hall, which had caused reactions as well.

== See also ==
- Coronation of Reza Shah
- Naderi Throne
- Golestan Palace
- 2,500-year celebration of the Persian Empire
