= Empress's Crown =

Crown of the Empress of Iran

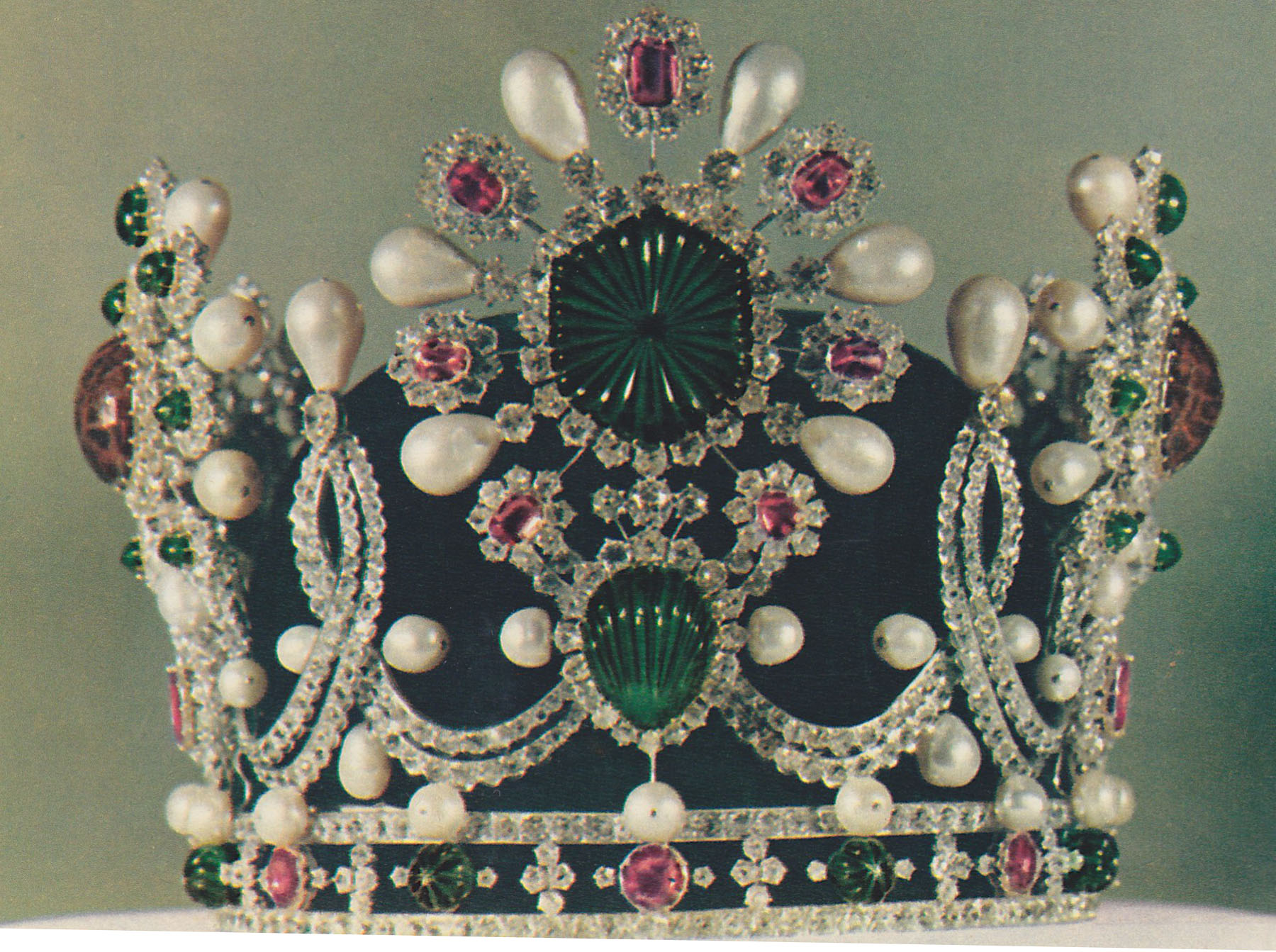
- Crown of Empress Farah Pahlavi, 1967

Heraldic depictions
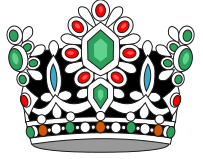

Details
- Country: Iran
- Made: 1967
- Weight: 2 kg
- Material: White gold, silver
- Cap: Green velvet
- Notable stones: Pearl, diamond, emerald, ruby, spinel

The Empress's Crown or Shahbanu's Crown (Persian: تاج شهبانو) is part of the coronation regalia used by the third Shahbanu (Empress) of Iran (Persia), Farah Pahlavi. The crown is part of the Iranian National Jewels, and is currently on display at the Treasury of National Jewels in Tehran.

This crown is historically significant in the Iranian tradition. The two Sasanian empresses regnant, Boran and Azarmidokht, c. 630, were the last two that were crowned as shahbanu before Farah Pahlavi, consort of the last shah of Iran, Mohammad Reza Pahlavi, was crowned shahbanu in 1967, a first since the Muslim conquest of Persia in the 7th century.

== Background ==
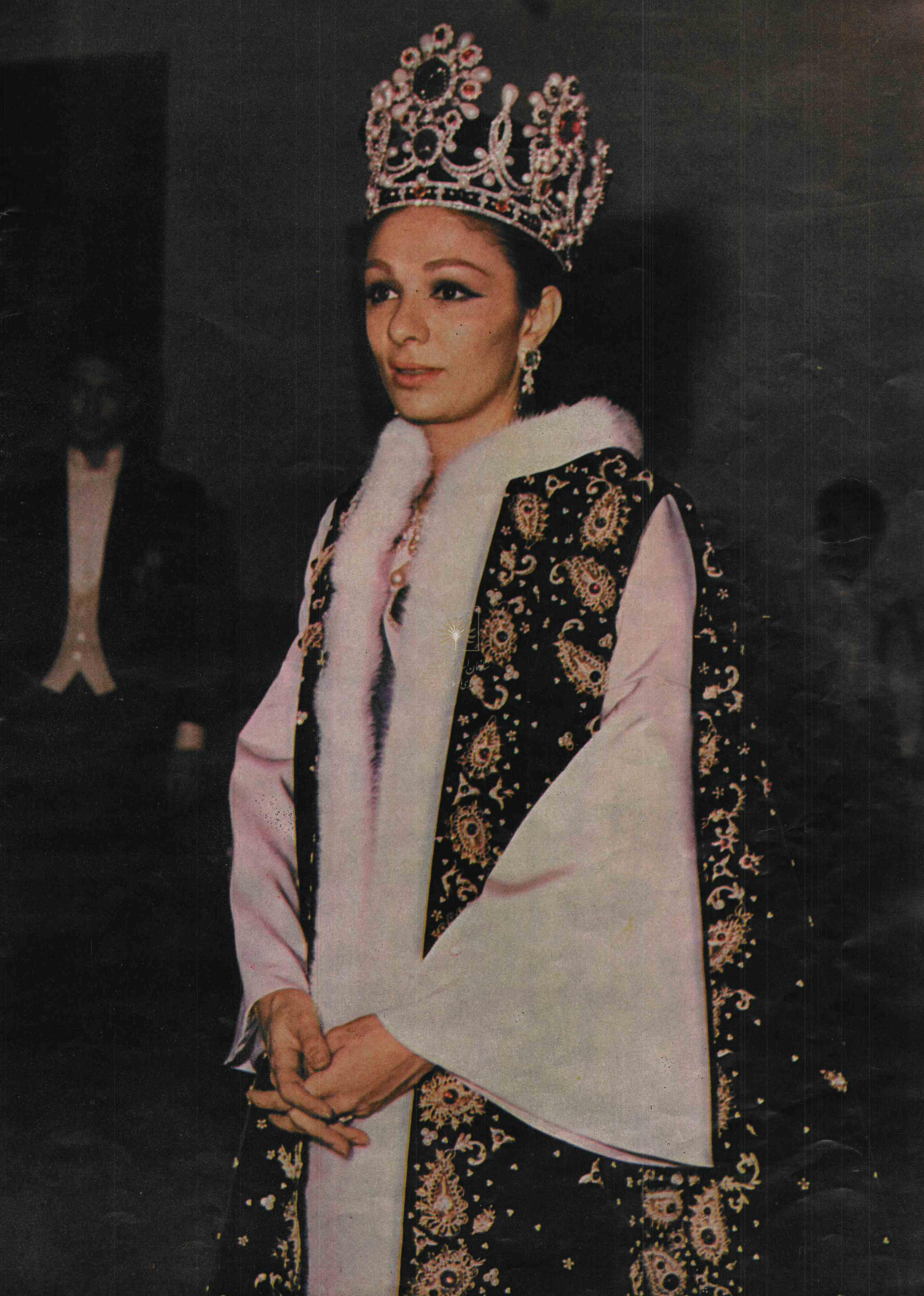
Shahbanu Farah wearing the crown at the coronation ceremony, 1967

Following in the footsteps of policies initiated under the White Revolution that directed the further emancipation of Iranian women, Mohammad Reza Pahlavi determined to make a symbolic gesture by crowning his consort, Shahbanu Farah, during his own elaborate coronation ceremony in October 1967. The wives of Iranian monarchs had not been crowned since the Muslim conquest of Persia and therefore a new crown had to be commissioned for the occasion. That honour was bestowed upon the French jewelers, Van Cleef & Arpels.

In accordance with tradition, the gems used were selected from loose stones already in the Imperial treasury. Since it was against the law for items from the treasury to leave Iran, Van Cleef & Arpels were obliged to send a team of jewelers to Tehran in order to construct the crown, a process which occupied them for six months.

== Composition ==
The frame of the crown is made of white gold and is lined with a cap of green velvet. The crown contains 36 emeralds, 105 pearls, 34 rubies, two spinels, and 1,469 diamonds. The largest emerald is located in the center of the sunburst on the front of the crown, and weighs approximately 92 cts. The two large spinels are approximately 83 cts., and the largest pearl is approximately 22 mm long.

In her memoir, Shahbanu Farah extolls the beauty of the crown but notes that it was also quite heavy, weighing nearly two kilograms.
