= Coronation of the Iranian monarch =

Formal investiture and crowning ceremony

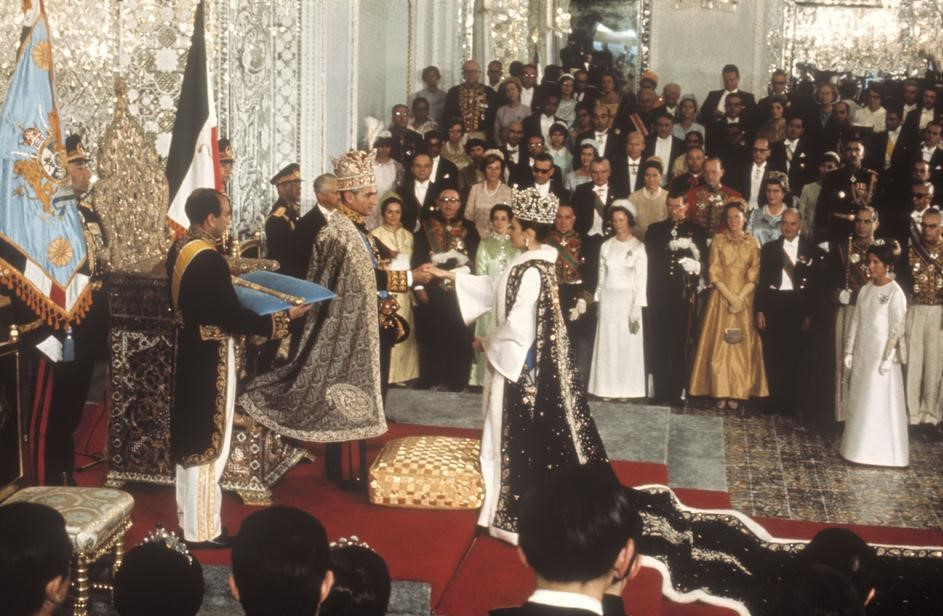
Coronation of Mohammad Reza Shah and Farah Pahlavi in 1967.

The coronation of the monarch of Iran (Note: With regard to the name of Iran: "Persia" was an exonym used by the ancient Greeks to refer to the Achaemenid Empire, derived from the Persians (the Iranian ethnic group to which the Achaemenid dynasty belonged). Consequently, "Persia" was the word commonly used in the Western world to refer to Iran and its people, regardless of their ethnicity. "Iran" (Persian: ایران) is the country's endonym, first attested under the Sasanian Empire, though earlier forms of the name (see Aryan and Arya) date back to the Proto-Indo-Iranian people and had been used ever since. In 1935, the Iranian king Reza Shah requested that foreign delegates begin using "Iran" rather than "Persia" in formal correspondence, whereafter "Iran" has also become the common name used in the Western world and internationally.) is an initiation ceremony in which they are formally invested with regalia and self-crowned at the Golestan Palace. A coronation is a symbolic formality and does not signify the official beginning of the monarch's reign; de jure and de facto his or her reign commences from the moment of the preceding monarch's death or abdication, maintaining legal continuity of the monarchy.

The coronation usually takes place several months after the death of the monarch's predecessor, as it is considered a joyous occasion that would be inappropriate while mourning continues. This interval also gives planners enough time to complete the required elaborate arrangements. However, when Mohammad Reza Pahlavi took the oath of office in the National Consultative Assembly and became the Shah of Iran, the original coronation ceremony was postponed at his request. This meant that the coronation took place 26 years after the beginning of his reign.

== History ==
=== Pre-Islamic era ===
Plutarch wrote in his Life of King Artaxerxes that the Persian king was required to go to the ancient capital of Pasargadae for his coronation ceremony. Once there, he entered a temple "to a warlike goddess, whom one might liken to Artemis" (whose name is unknown today, nor can this temple be located), and there divested himself of his own robe, substituting the one worn by Cyrus I at his crowning. After this, he had to consume a "frail" of figs, eat turpentine and drink a cup of sour milk. Plutarch observed that "if they add any other rites, it is unknown to any but those that are present at them". The two Sasanian empresses regnant, Boran and Azarmidokht, c. 630, were the two monarchs that were crowned as shahbanu.

=== Pahlavi era ===
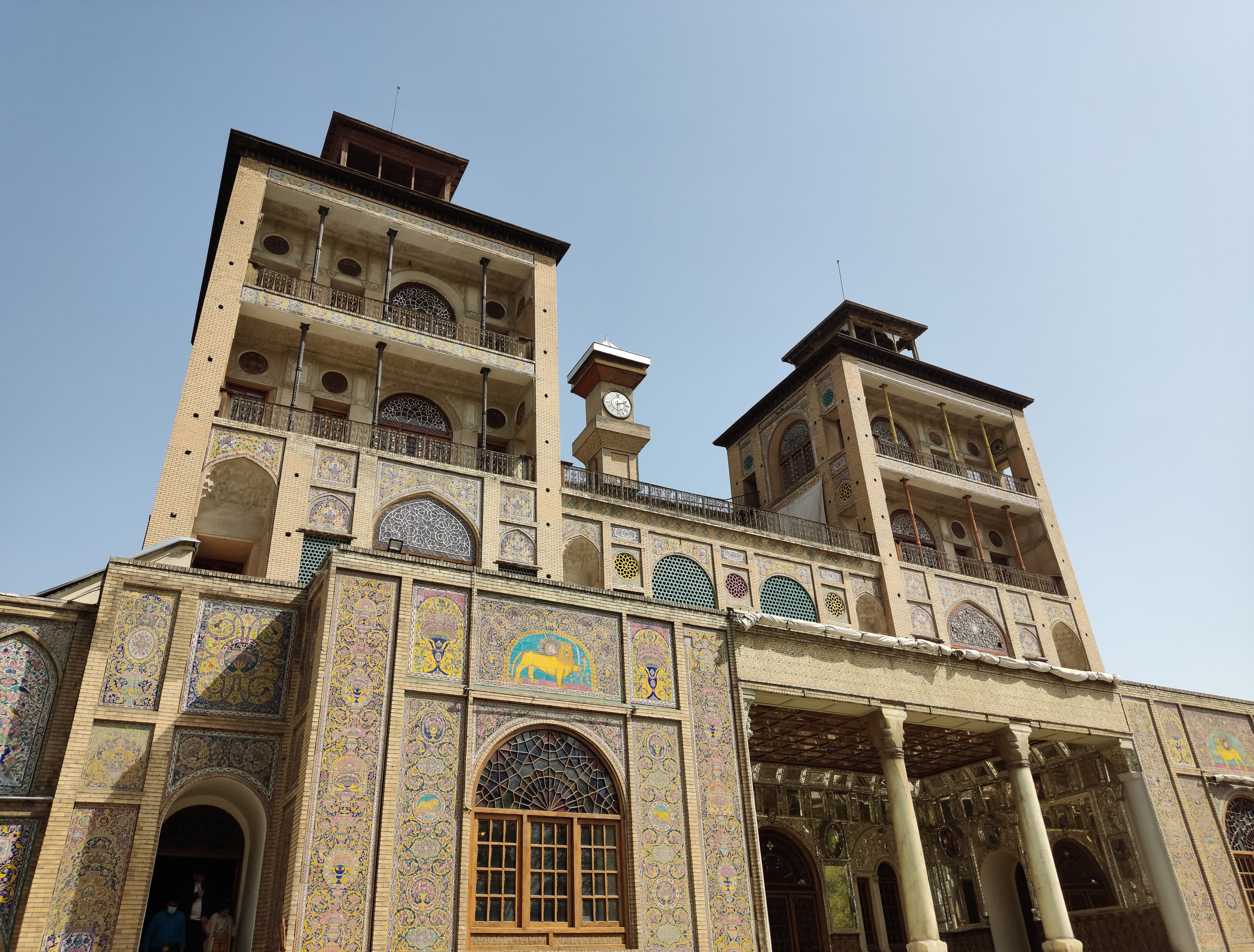
The Golestan Palace, where the ceremony was usually held in.

The monarchs crowned themselves in elaborate coronation rituals, the latest of which were staged in Tehran, the capital since 1786. The first Pahlavi coronation took place in 1926, when Reza Shah, was crowned as shah and founded the Pahlavi dynasty on the same day of his coronation. The final coronation was that of Mohammad Reza Pahlavi, which took place in 1967. His coronation is more notable since Farah Pahlavi, Mohammad Reza's spouse, was crowned shahbanu in 1967, a first since the Muslim conquest of Persia in the 7th century.
