= Naderi Throne =

Iranian throne, Qajar era

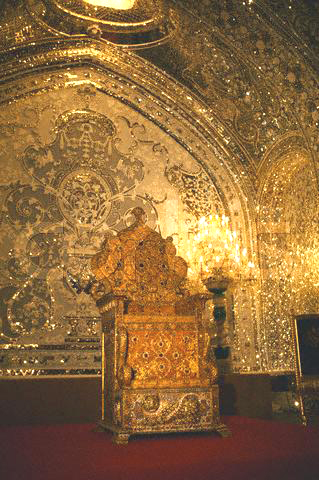
The Naderi Throne in Golestan Palace, Tehran, Iran

The Naderi Throne (Persian: تخت نادری, lit. 'the Rare Throne') is a gemmed and enameled throne of Iran made during the early Qajar era. It is now kept as a part of the Iranian National Jewels in the Treasury of National Jewels at the Central Bank of Iran. The throne has no relation to Nader Shah; the name derives from the word nader meaning "rare" or "unique" in the Persian language.

== History ==
The throne was made by the order of Fat'h-Ali Shah Qajar (r. 1797–1834) and is seen in paintings of his era. Unlike the platform-like Sun Throne and Marble Throne, the Naderi Throne has the appearance of a chair.

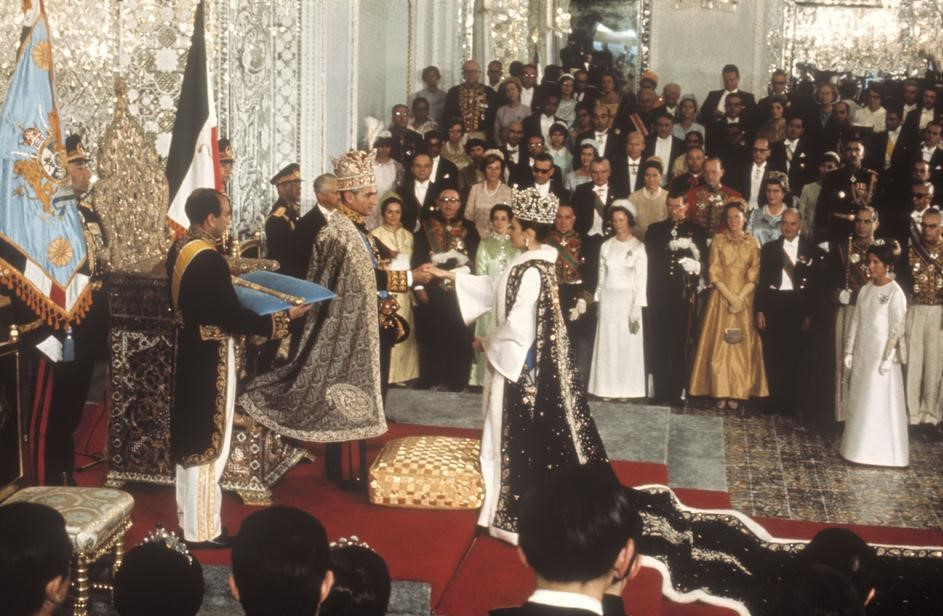
The Naderi throne at the coronation of Mohammad Reza Pahlavi, 1967

The throne was kept in the Golestan Palace but was later transferred to the Treasury of National Jewels at the Central Bank of Iran. It was last used in the coronation ceremony of Mohammad Reza Pahlavi in 1967.

== Design ==
The throne can be taken apart into 12 separate pieces. It was intended to be portable and carried along when the Shah traveled to his summer residences. It is made of wood, covered with gold, and encrusted with jewels. Among the 26,733 jewels covering the throne, there are four spinels on the backrest, the largest of them weighing 65 ct. There are also four emeralds on the backrest, the largest of them weighing approximately 225 ct. The largest ruby on the throne is 35 ct. The height of the throne is approximately 225 cm. It has inscribed verses attributed to Fat'h-Ali Shah. Diaries written by travelers who visited Fat'h-Ali Shah's court at the time also mention a throne similar to this one, though the throne may have been refurbished by Naser al-Din Shah Qajar.

== Gallery ==
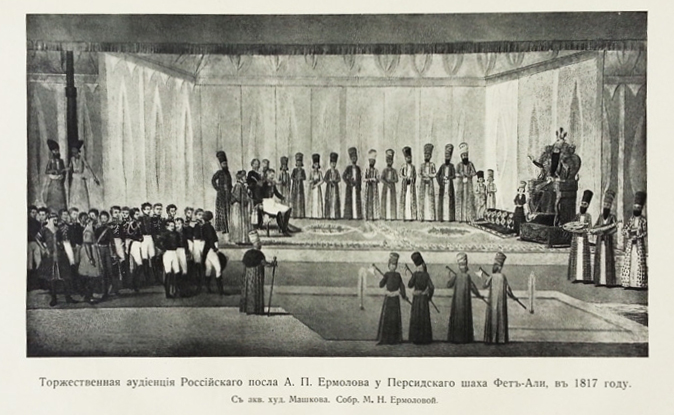
Fath-Ali Shah Qajar, seated on the Naderi Throne, receives Aleksey Yermolov for negotiations, 1817

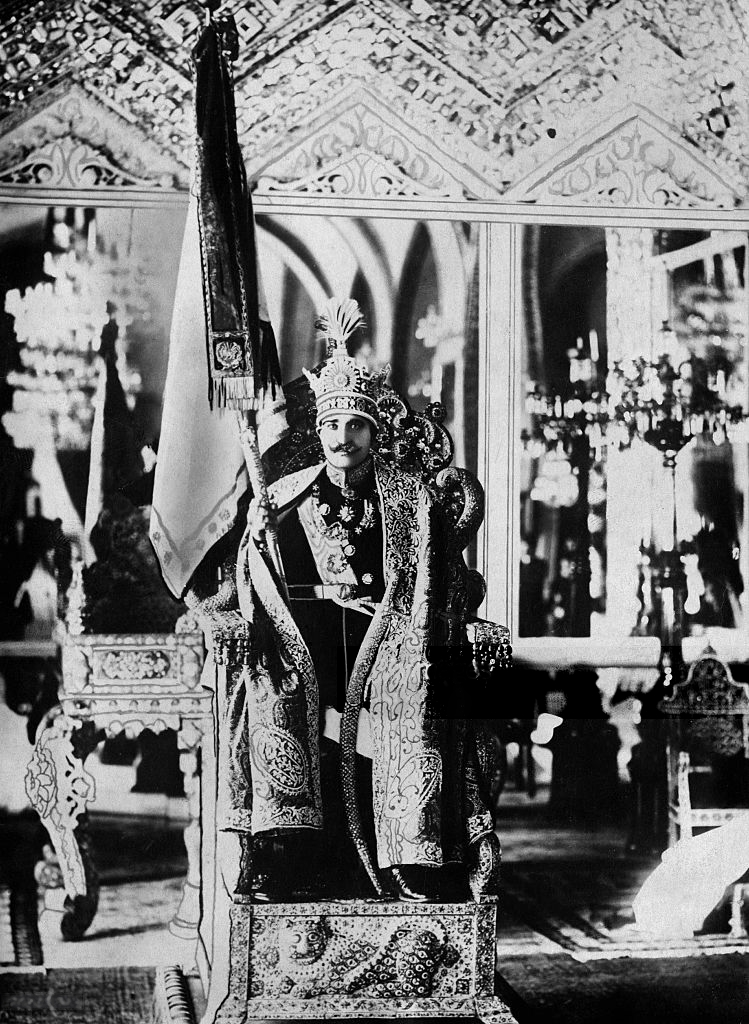
Reza Shah on the Naderi throne for his coronation, 1926

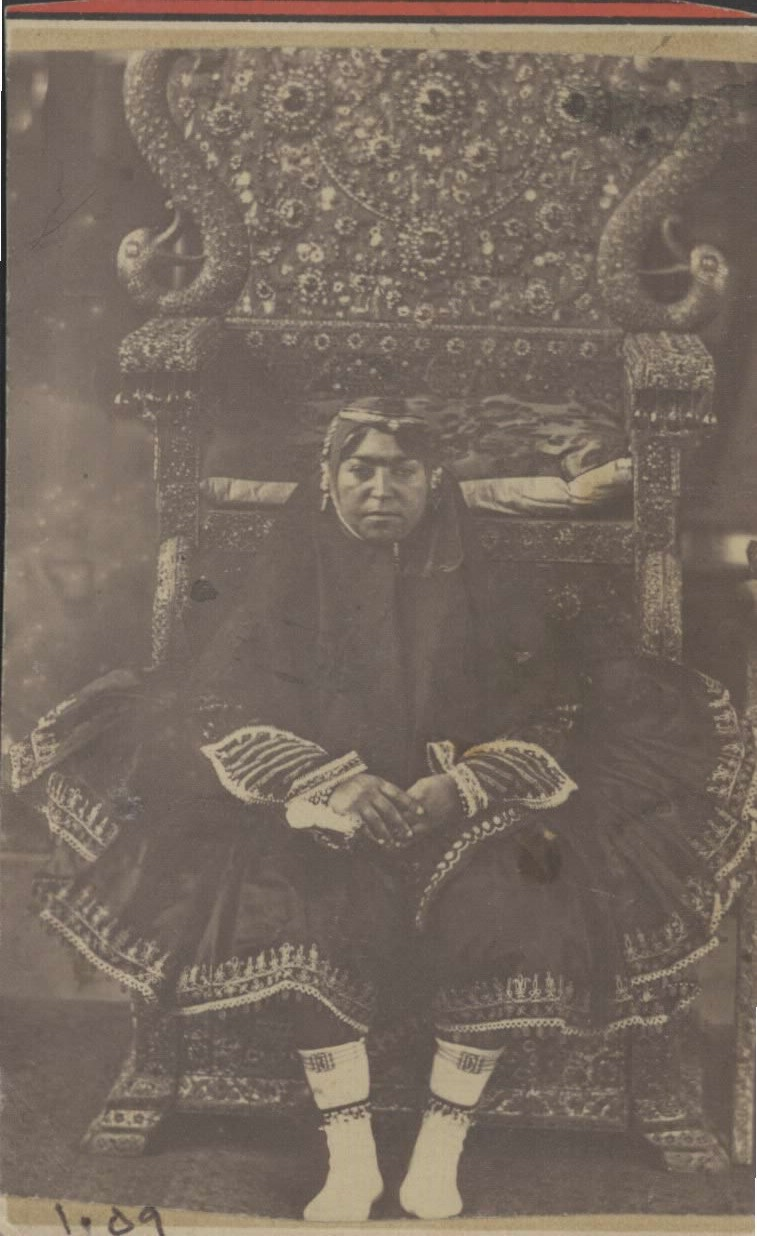
Princess Ezzat ed-Dowleh on the step of the Naderi throne, late 19th century

== See also ==
- Iranian National Jewels
- Kiani Crown
- Koh-i-Noor
- Daria-i-Noor
