= Golden Belt =

Part of the Iranian Crown Jewels

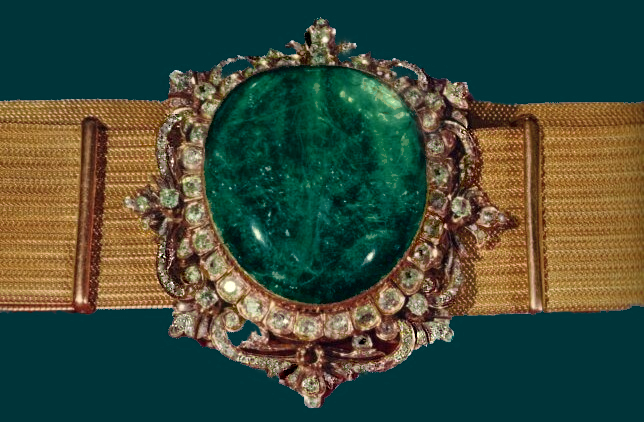
- Emerald is visible at the center of a golden belt

Details
- Country: Iran
- Made: about 1850
- Material: Gold, silver
- Notable stones: emerald, diamond

The Golden Belt (Persian: کمربند زرین) or Shah's Coronation Belt is a 119 cm belt with a unique, 176 carat emerald on it. It also is decorated with 60 brilliant diamonds and 145 diamonds of different cut. It is kept in the National Treasury of Iran in Tehran.

This belt was created at the command of Naser al-Din Shah Qajar.

== Gallery ==
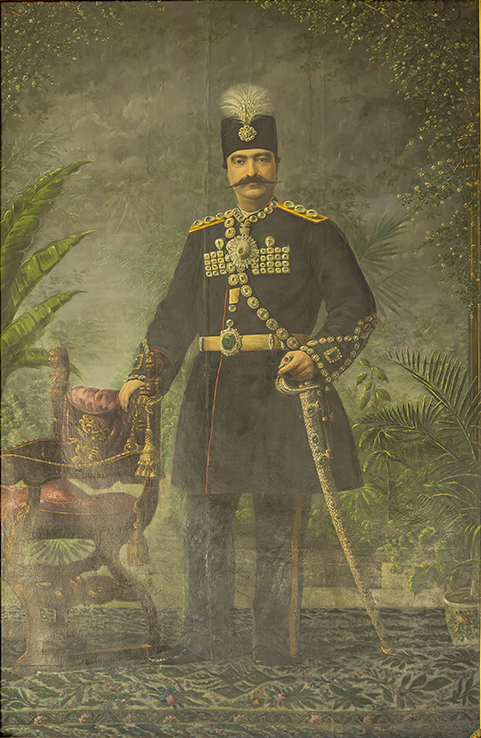
Naser al-Din Shah Qajar wearing the Golden Belt, by Seyed Shirazi, late 19th centurt

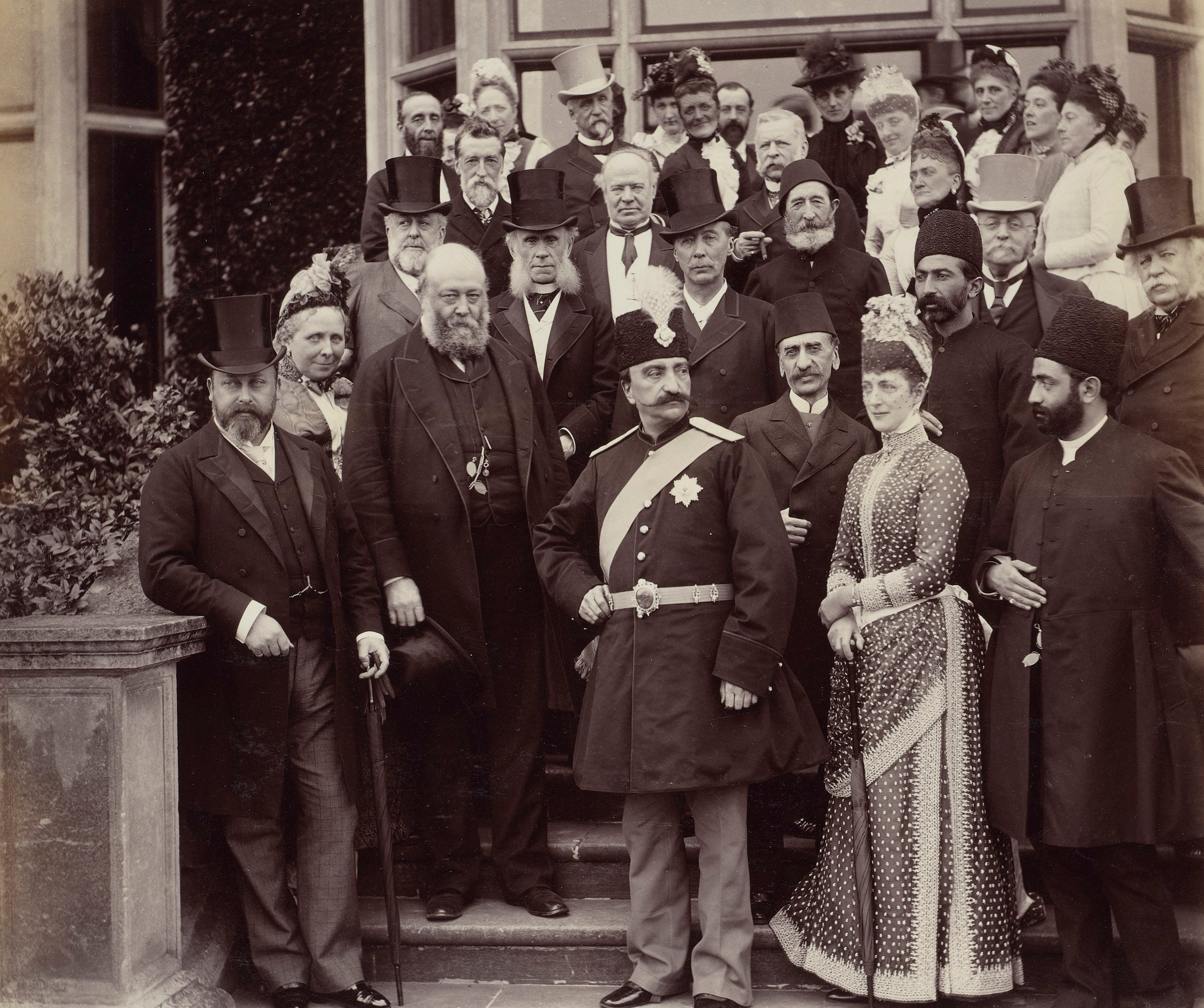
Naser al-Din Shah Qajar wearing the belt during his tour of Europe, Hatfield House, 1889

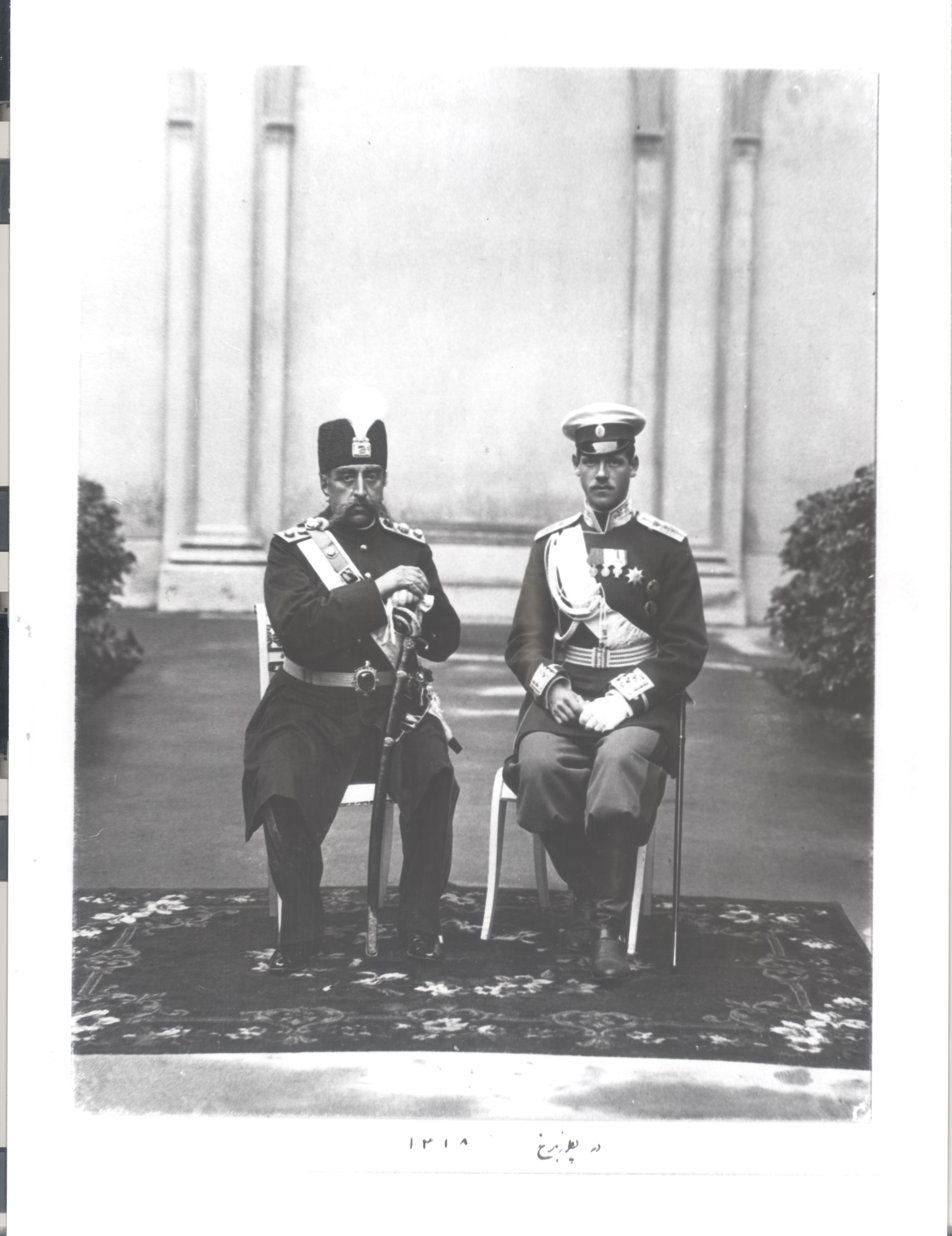
Mozaffar ad-Din Shah Qajar wearing the belt in Saint Petersburg, c. 1900

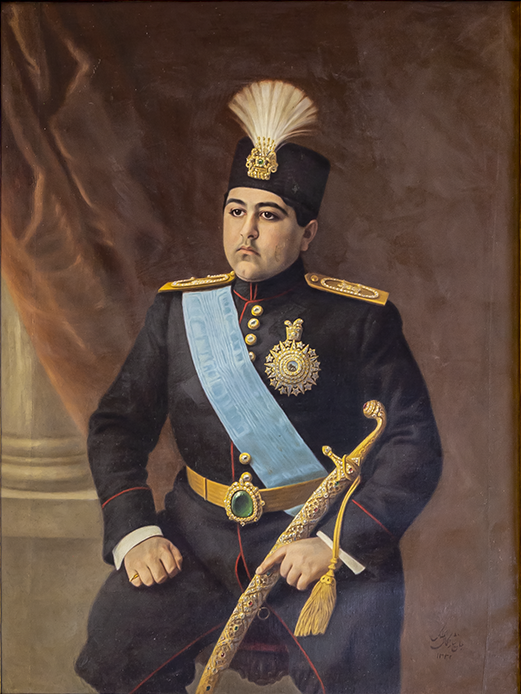
Ahmad Shah Qajar wearing the belt, by Kamal-ol-molk, 1913/14

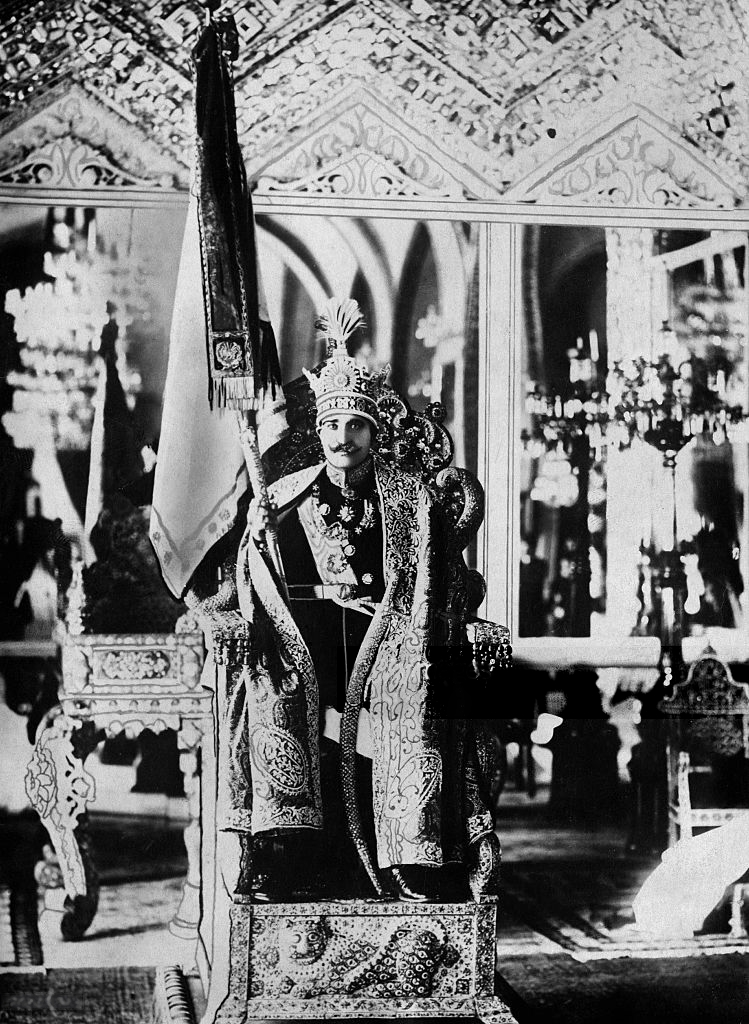
Reza Shah wearing the belt at his coronation, 1926

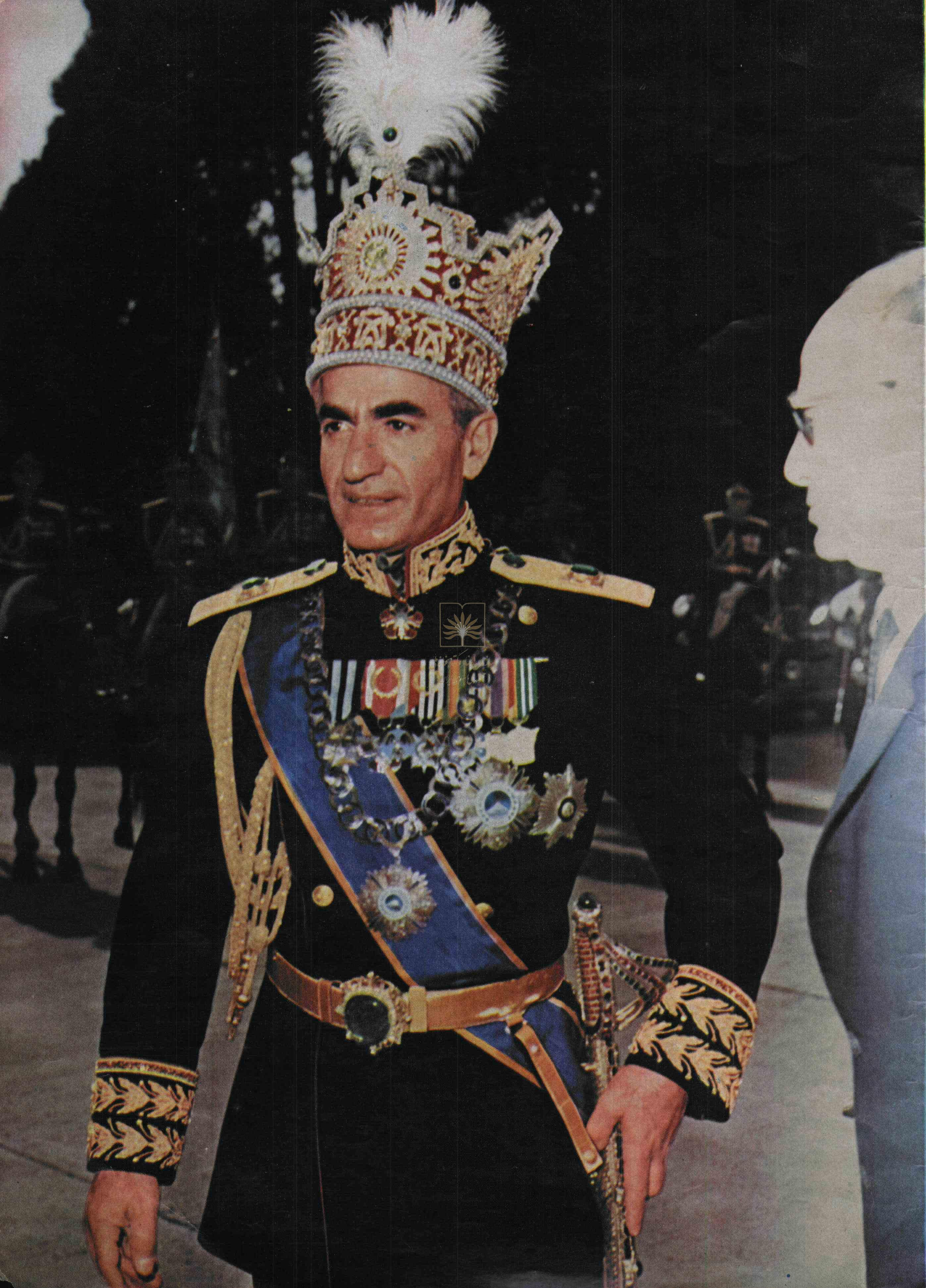
Mohammad Reza Pahlavi wearing the belt at his coronation, 1967

== See also ==
- Kiani Crown
- Pahlavi Crown
- Daria-i-Noor
