= Samarian spinel =

500-carat (100 g) spinel gemstone

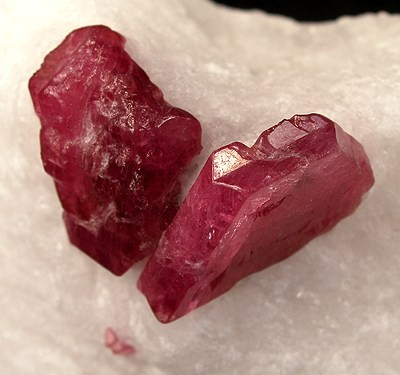
Spinel

The Samarian Spinel is a 500-carat (100 g) spinel gemstone that is the largest of its kind in the world. It is part of the Iranian Crown Jewels.

== Origins ==
It and a smaller 270-carat (54 g) spinel were captured and taken to Iran by Nader Shah following his 18th-century invasion of India.

The Samarian spinel has a hole in it. According to a diary entry of the court physician to Naser al-Din Shah Qajar, the shah told the physician that the stone once adorned the neck of the biblical golden calf, which the Israelites are said to have made while Moses was receiving the Ten Commandments. A diamond was later added to conceal the hole.

== See also ==
- List of individual gemstones
