= Pahlavi Crown =

Coronation crown of the Iranian Pahlavi dynasty

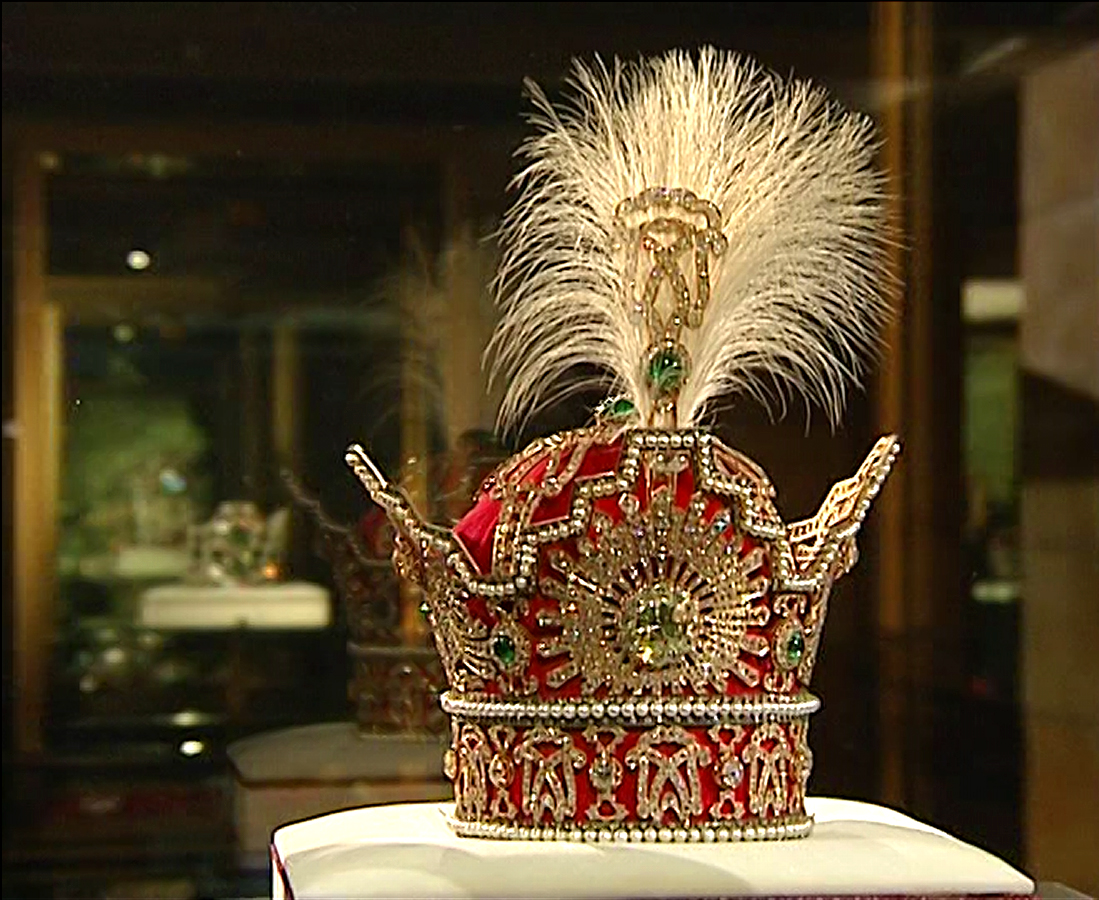
- Pahlavi Crown, shown in the Treasury of National Jewels

Heraldic depictions

Details
- Country: Iran (Persia)
- Made: 1926
- Weight: 2 kg
- Material: Gold, silver
- Cap: Red velvet
- Notable stones: Pearl, diamond, emerald, ruby, spinel

The Pahlavi Crown (Persian: تاج پهلوی) was the Iranian coronation crown used during the Pahlavi era (1925–1979). It is held amongst the Iranian National Jewels by the government of Iran.

== Background ==
Following the ascension of the Pahlavi dynasty in 1925, Reza Shah ordered a group of Iranian jewelers, under the supervision of Haj Serajeddin Javaheri, to create a new crown to replace the Kiani Crown, which had been used by the Qajar dynasty. Inspiration for the new design was drawn from paintings and historical references to Persian crowns used during the Sasanian era from 224 to 651 AD.

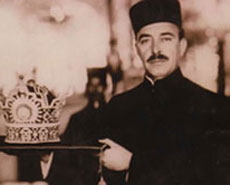
The Pahlavi Crown held by the Minister of the Royal Court, Abdolhossein Teymourtash

The Pahlavi Crown was commissioned and first used for the coronation of Reza Shah on 25 April 1926. It was used for the last time during the coronation of his son and successor Mohammad Reza Pahlavi on 26 October 1967. The crown is currently on display with the rest of the Iranian National Jewels at the Treasury of National Jewels in Tehran.

Although the Pahlavi Crown was not assembled until the early 20th century, the stones used in its production, as per tradition, were selected from the thousands of loose stones already in the Iranian Imperial Treasury.

== Composition ==
The frame of the crown is made of gold, silver and red velvet. It has a maximum height of 29.8 cm, a width of 19.8 cm and weighs nearly 2,080 grams. A staggering 3,380 diamonds, totaling 1,144 carats (228.8 g), are set into the object. The largest of these is a 60-carat (12 g) yellow brilliant diamond which is centrally placed in a sunburst of white diamonds.

Found in three rows are 369 nearly identical natural white pearls. The crown also contains five sizable emeralds (totaling 200 carats (40 g)), the largest of which is approximately 100 carats (20 g) and located on the apex of the crown.

== In popular culture ==
- In Peter O'Donnell's 1981 Modesty Blaise novel The Xanadu Talisman, Modesty and Willie Garvin are pursued by the Moroccan underworld on a quest to recover the Pahlavi Crown.

== Gallery ==
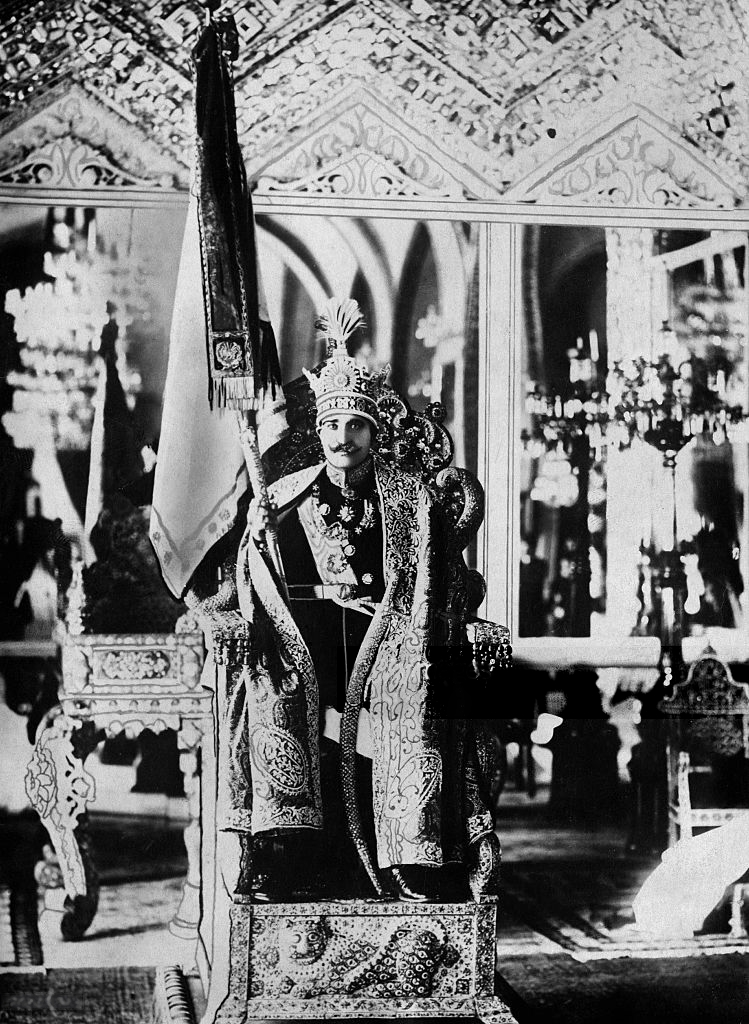
Reza Shah wearing the crown at his coronation, 1926

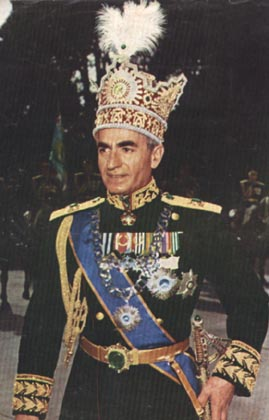
Mohammad Reza Shah wearing the crown at his coronation, 1967

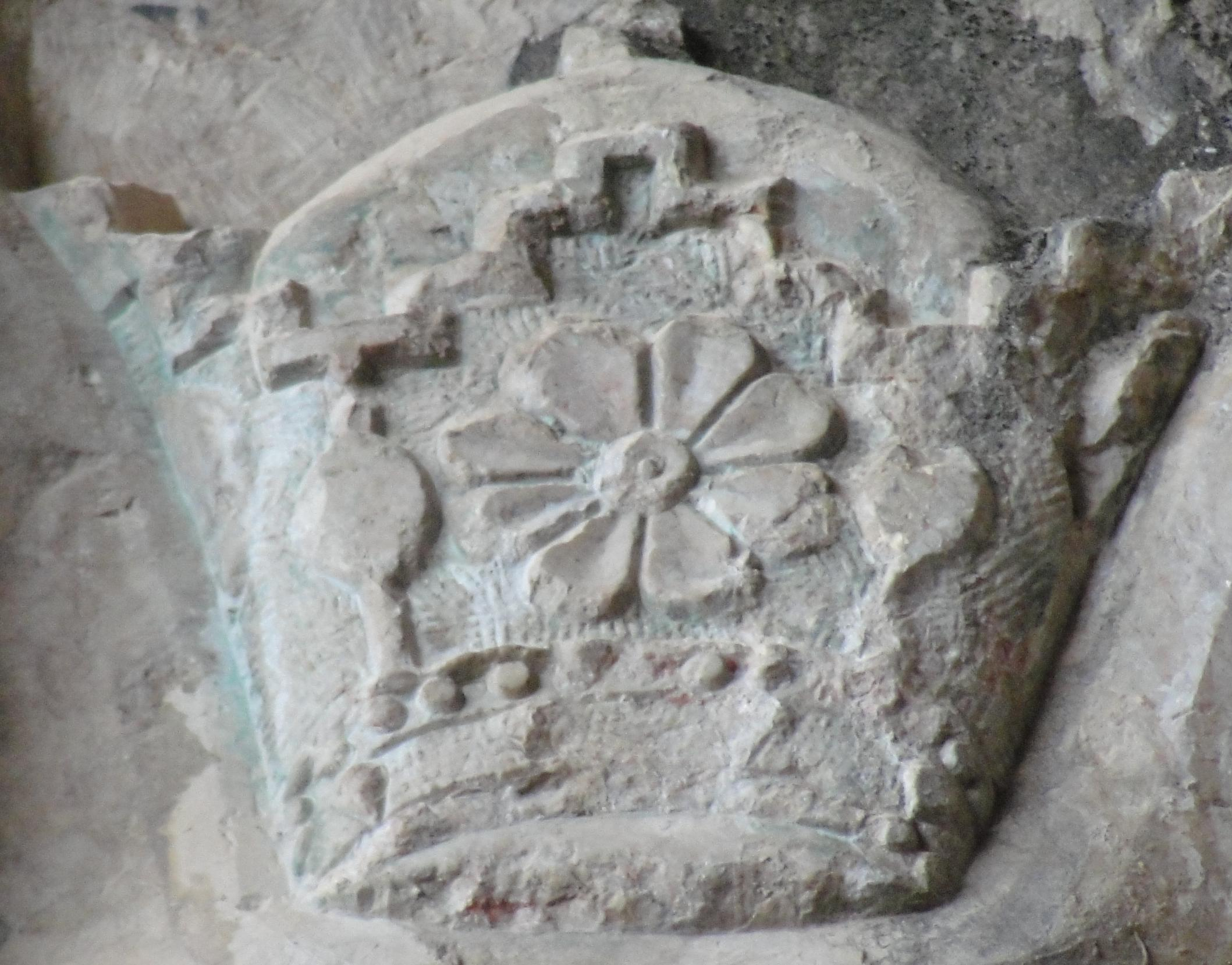
The crown engraved above a 1957 inscription at Shapur Cave

== See also ==
Media related to Pahlavi Crown at Wikimedia Commons
