= Nader Shah's Sword =

18th century Iranian ruler's sword

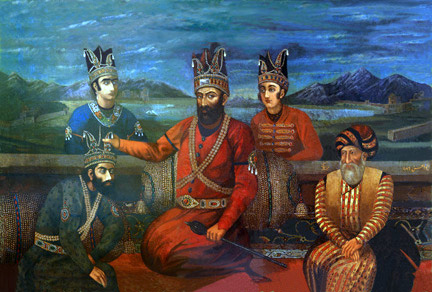
Painting of Nader Shah and two of his sons

Nader Shah's Sword (Persian: شمشیر نادرشاه) refers to the sword carried by Iranian ruler Nader Shah (r. 1736–1747). It is located in Tehran, Iran. Under Fath-Ali Shah Qajar (r. 1797–1834), some fifty years or more later, it was inscribed and embellished. The scabbard of the sword is covered with diamonds. The modern historian Michael Axworthy notes that "Nader used the imagery of the sword to describe himself on a number of occasions".

The sword is not visible in any of the portraits of Fath-Ali Shah. There is, however, a mural in the Marble Room of the Golestan Palace which shows Mohammad Shah Qajar, the successor to Fath-Ali Shah, wearing the sword while on horseback.

The reverse side of the sword and scabbard shows a picture of the Shah on the hilt along with a few lines of verse, and the pictures of two of his sons.

== See also ==
- Asadullah Isfahani
