= Coronation of Reza Shah =

1926 coronation in Iran

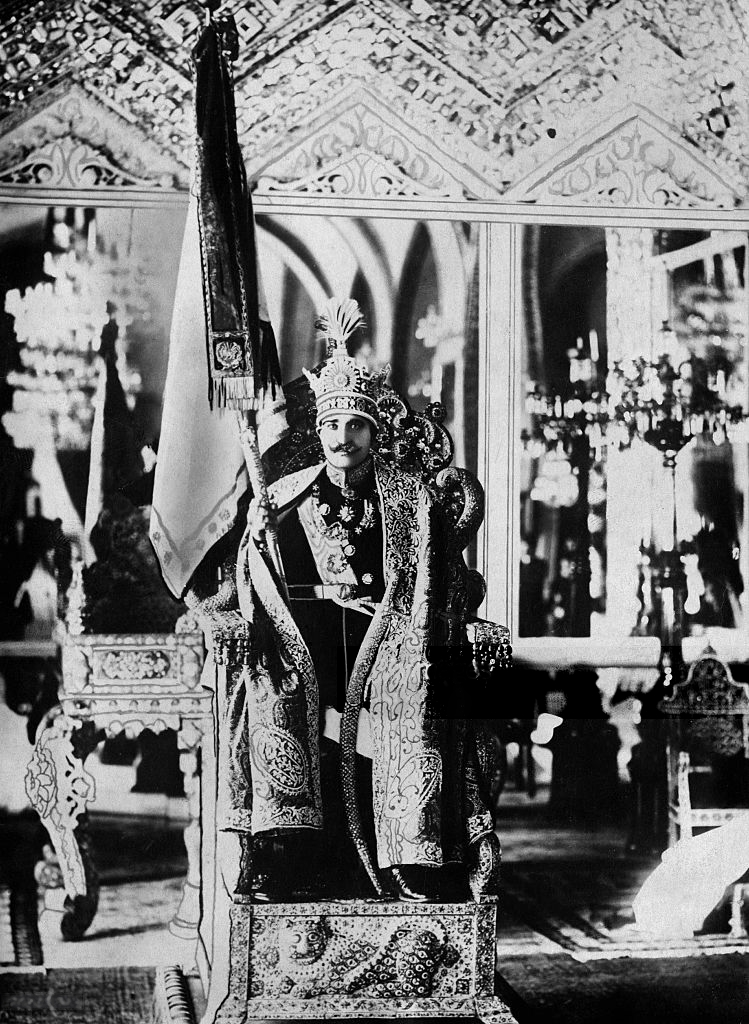
- The official coronation photograph of Reza Shah
- Native name: Persian: تاج‌گذاری رضا شاه, romanized: Tâj Gozâri-ye Rezâ Shâh
- Date: 25 April 1926; 100 years ago
- Venue: Salam Hall, Golestan Palace
- Location: Tehran, Iran
- Organized by: Government of Iran
- Participants: Reza Shah; Members of the Pahlavi dynasty; Ministry of the Royal Court; Public officials

The coronation of Reza Shah, the shah of Iran took place on 25 April 1926, at the Salam Hall in Golestan Palace. Reza Shah acceded to the throne after Ahmad Shah Qajar, the last monarch from the Qajar dynasty, was deposed by the National Consultative Assembly and Reza was elected to be Qajar's successor on 15 December 1925. Reza Shah's coronation marked the beginning of the Pahlavi dynasty's rule in Iran, which would last up until they were overthrown in the Iranian Revolution of 1979.

== Event ==
On 25 April 1926, Reza Shah placed the newly made, Pahlavi Crown on himself in the Salam Hall of the Golestan Palace. The day prior to the coronation, Reza Shah's eldest son, Mohammad Reza, was proclaimed Crown Prince. After Reza Shah's abdication in 1941, Mohammad Reza became the Shah of Iran and he also had a coronation in 1967.

== Gallery ==
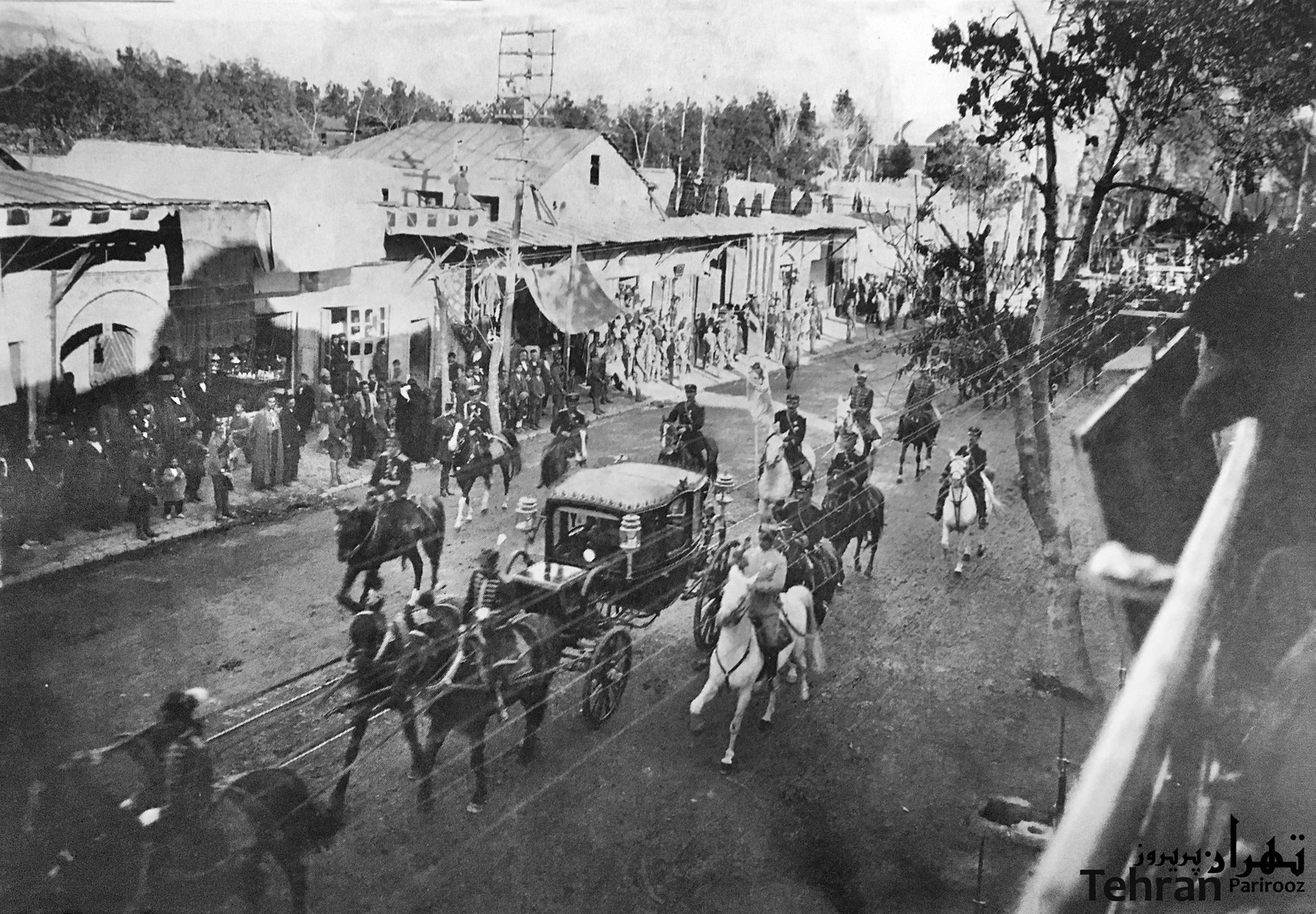
The Coronation Coach carrying the Shah to Golestan Palace

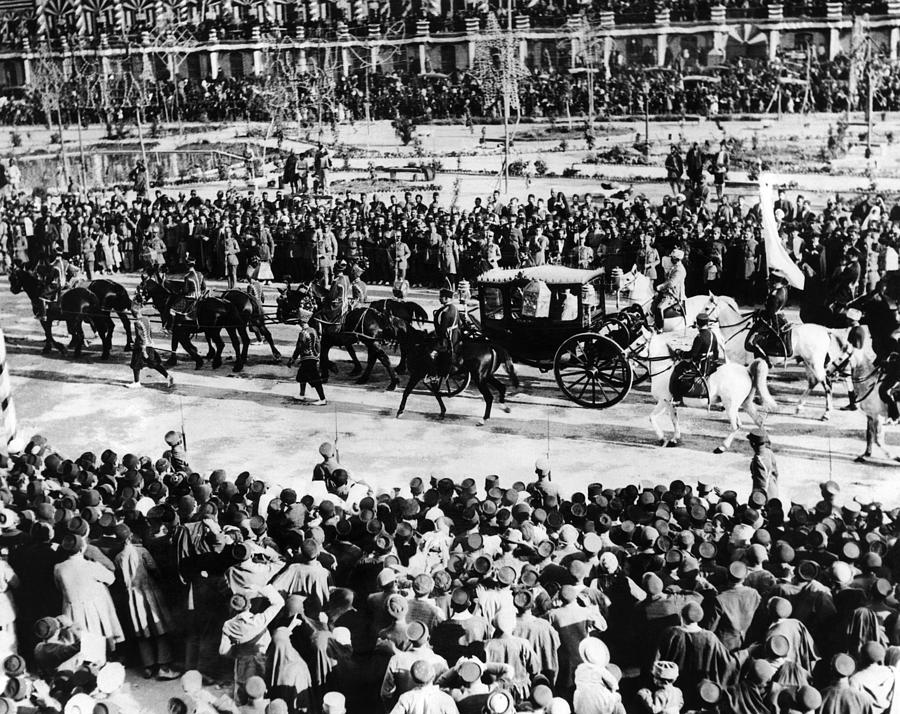
Military parade on the occasion of the coronation

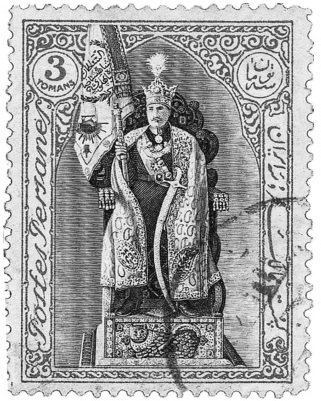
A stamp commemorating the coronation

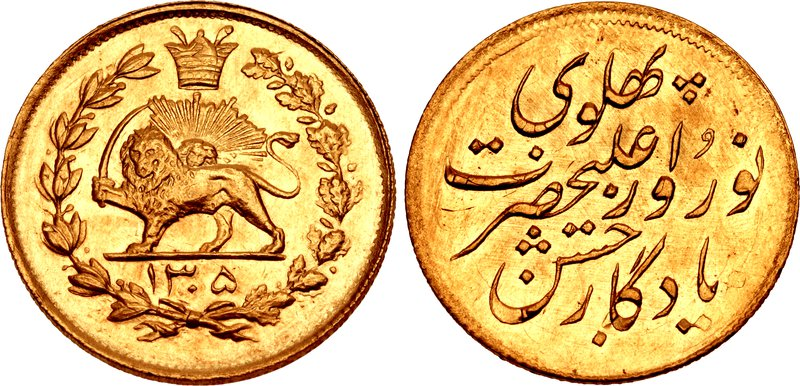
A coin commemorating the coronation

== See also ==
- Coronation of Mohammad Reza Pahlavi
