= Shahbanu =

Persian royal title

Imperial arms of Shahbanu Farah of Iran

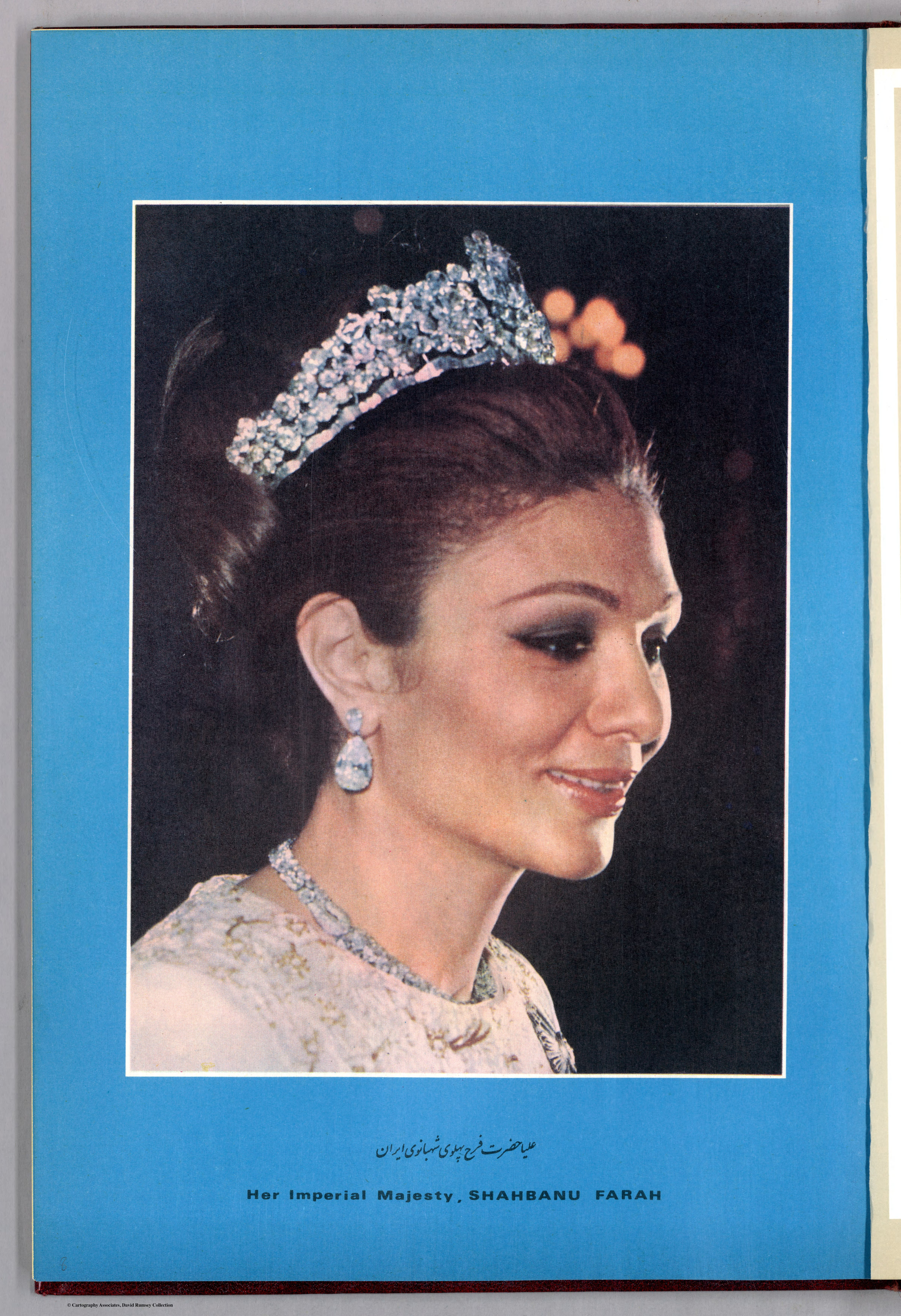
1972 portrait of Farah Pahlavi, describing her as Shahbanu Farah

Shahbanu (Persian: شهبانو, romanized: Šahbānū, lit. 'Lady King') was a title for empress regnant or empress consort in Persian and other Iranian languages. The title was specifically used by Farah Pahlavi (née Farah Diba), the wife of Mohammad Reza Pahlavi, the last reigning Shah of Iran (Persia).

During the Sasanian era, the principal queen was titled banbishnan banbishn (lit. 'Queen of Queens') analogous to the emperor's title shahanshah (lit. 'King of Kings') to distinguish her from the other queens in the royal household.

Farah Pahlavi sometimes continues to be referred to as Shahbanu, as is customarily done internationally for titleholders associated with abolished monarchies, but the title is no longer valid in Iran. According to the Persian Constitution of 1906, the current holder of the title would be Yasmine Pahlavi, the wife of Reza Pahlavi, the pretender to the throne.

== See also ==
- Shah
- List of royal consorts of Iran
