= List of Arabic theophoric names =

This is a list of Arabic theophoric names.

== Islamic names ==
=== ‘Abdu عبدُ as a prefix of names of God ===
Following are names consisting of the appellation ʿabd al-, 'servant of' followed by one of the names associated with God in the Qur'an.

- Abdullah (عبد الله)
- Abdul 'Adl (عبد العدل)
- Abdul 'Afuw (عبد العفو)
- Abdul 'Alim (عبد العليم)
- Abdul 'Ali (عبد العلي)
- Abdul 'Ati (عبد العاطي)
- Abdul 'Azim (عبد العظيم)
- Abdul 'Aziz (عبد العزيز)
- Abdul Ahad (عبد الأحد)
- Abdul Akbar (عبد الأكبر)
- Abdul Akhir (عبد الأخر)
- Abdul Awwal (عبد الأول)
- Abdul Badi' (عبد البديع)
- Abdul Baith (عبد الباعث)
- Abdul Bari' (عبد البارئ)
- Abdul Barr (عبد البر)
- Abdul Baqi (عبد الباقي)
- Abdul Basir (عبد البصير)
- Abdul Basit (عبد الباسط)
- Abdul Batin (عبد الباطن)
- Abdud Dar (عبد الضار) (or Abduz Zar)
- Abdul Fattah (عبد الفتاح)
- Abdul Ghaffar (عبد الغفار)
- Abdul Ghafur (عبد الغفور)
- Abdul Ghani (عبد الغني)
- Abdul Hadi (عبد الهادي)
- Abdul Hafiz (عبد الحافظ)
- Abdul Hafiz (عبد الحفيط)
- Abdul Hai (عبد الحي)
- Abdul Hakam (عبد الحكم)
- Abdul Hakem (عبد الحاكم)
- Abdul Hakim (عبد الحكيم)
- Abdul Halim (عبد الحليم)
- Abdul Hamid (عبد الحميد)
- Abdul Haq (عبد الحق)
- Abdul Hasib (عبد الحسيب)
- Abdul Hussein (عبد الحسين)
- Abdul Jabbar (عبد الجبار)
- Abdul Jalil (عبد الجليل)
- Abdul Jami' (عبد الجامع)
- Abdul Jamil (عبد الجميل)
- Abdul Kabir (عبد الكبير)
- Abdul Kafi (عبد الكافي)
- Abdul Karim (عبد الكريم)
- Abdul Khabir (عبد الخبير)
- Abdul Khafid (عبد الخافض)
- Abdul Khaliq (عبد الخالق)
- Abdul Latif (عبد اللطيف)
- Abdul Maajid (عبد الماجد)
- Abdul Maalik (عبد المالك)
- Abdul Majid (عبد المجيد)
- Abdul Malik (عبد الملك)
- Abdul Mani' (عبد المانع)
- Abdul Mannan (عبد المنان)
- Abdul Matin (عبد المتين)
- Abdul Muakhir (عبد المؤخر)
- Abdul Mubdi' (عبد المبدئ)
- Abdul Mudhill (عبد المذل)
- Abdul Mughni (عبد المغني)
- Abdul Muhaimin (عبد المهيمن)
- Abdul Muhsi (عبد المحصي)
- Abdul Muhsin (عبد المحسن)
- Abdul Muhyi (عبد المحيي)
- Abdul Muid (عبد المعيد)
- Abdul Muizz (عبد المعز)
- Abdul Mujib (عبد المجيب)
- Abdul Mumin (عبد المؤمن)
- Abdul Mumit (عبد المميت)
- Abdul Mun'im (عبد المنعم)
- Abdul Muntaqim (عبد المنتقم)
- Abdul Muqaddim (عبد المقدم)
- Abdul Muqit (عبد المقيت)
- Abdul Muqsit (عبد المقسط)
- Abdul Muqtadir (عبد المقتدر)
- Abdul Musawwir (عبد المصور)
- Abdul Mutakabbir (عبد المتكبر)
- Abdul Mutali (عبد المتعالي)
- Abdul Muttalib (عبد المطلب)
- Abdul Muti (عبد المعطي)
- Abdun Nabi (عبد النبي)
- Abdun Nafi' (عبد النافع)
- Abdun Nasir (عبد الناصر)
- Abdun Nur (عبد النور)
- Abdul Qabir (عبد القبير)
- Abdul Qadir (عبد القادر)
- Abdul Qahhar (عبد القهار)
- Abdul Qahir (عبد القاهر)
- Abdul Qawi (عبد القوي)
- Abdul Qayyum (عبد القيوم)
- Abdul Quddus (عبد القدوس)
- Abdur Rab (عبد الرب)
- Abdur Rafi' (عبد الرفيع)
- Abdur Rahim (عبد الرحيم)
- Abdur Rahman (عبد الرحمن)
- Abdur Raqib (عبد الرقيب)
- Abdur Rashid (عبد الرشيد)
- Abdur Rauf (عبد الرؤوف)
- Abdur Raziq (عبد الرازق)
- Abdur Razzaq (عبد الرزاق)
- Abdur Rida (عبد الرضا) (or Abdul Raza, Abdolreza)
- Abdus Sabur (عبد الصبور)
- Abdus Salam (عبد السلام)
- Abdus Samad (عبد الصمد)
- Abdus Sami (عبد السميع)
- Abdus Sattar (عبد الستار)
- Abdus Shahid (عبد الشهيد)
- Abdus Shakur (عبد الشكور)
- Abdus Subhan (عبد السبحان)
- Abdus Subuh (عبد الصبوح)
- Abdut Tawwab (عبد التواب)
- Abdul Waali (عبد الوالي)
- Abdul Wadud (عبد الودود)
- Abdul Wahhab (عبد الوهاب)
- Abdul Wahid (عبد الوحيد)
- Abdul Wajid (عبد الوجيد)
- Abdul Wakil (عبد الوكيل)
- Abdul Wali (عبد الولي)
- Abdul Warith (عبد الوارث)
- Abdul Wasi (عبد الواسع)
- Abduz Zahir (عبد الظاهر)

=== Allah suffix – of Allah ===
- Abdullah (عبد الله)
- Abidullah (عابد الله)
- Ahmadullah (أحمد الله)
- al-Mu'tasim Billah (المعتصم بالله)
- Amanullah (أمان الله)
- Amatullah (أمة الله)
- Aminullah (أمين الله)
- Asadullah (أسد الله)
- Ataullah (عطاء الله)
- Atiqullah (عتيق الله)
- Azimullah (عظيم الله)
- Azizullah (عزيز الله)
- Baha'allah (بهاء الله)
- Baitullah (بيت الله)
- Barkatullah (بركة الله)
- Billah (بالله)
- Daifallah (ضيف الله)
- Dhikrullah (ذكر الله)
- Faizullah (فيض الله)
- Fathallah (فتح الله)
- Fazlallah (فضل الله)
- Ehsanullah (احسان الله)
- Habibullah (حبيب الله)
- Hafizullah (حفيظ الله)
- Hamidullah (حميد الله)
- Hayatullah (حيات الله)
- Hibat Allah (هبة الله)
- Hidayatullah (هداية الله)
- Lutfullah (لطف الله)
- Ikramullah (اكرام الله)
- Imdadullah (امداد الله)
- Inayatullah (عنايت الله)
- Ismatullah (عصمة الله)
- Izzatullah (عزت الله)
- Jarallah (جار الله)
- Khaleelullah
- Kaleemullah (كليم الله)
- Karamatallah (كرامت الله)
- Khalilullah (خليل الله)
- Khairullah (خير الله)
- Mashallah (ماشاء الله)
- Muhibullah (محب الله)
- Najibullah (نجيب الله)
- Naqibullah (نقيب الله)
- Nasrallah (نصر الله)
- Nimatullah (نعمة الله)
- Nurullah (نور الله)
- Obaidullah (عبيد الله)
- Qudratullah (قدرة الله)
- Rahmatullah (رحمة الله)
- Rasoolullah (رسول الله)
- Rizqallah (رزق الله)
- Ruhullah (روح الله)
- Saadallah (سعد الله)
- Saifullah (سيف الله)
- Safiullah (صفي الله)
- Sanaullah (صنع الله)
- Samiullah (سميع الله)
- Shafiqullah (شفيق الله)
- Sharifullah (شريف الله)
- Sibghatullah (صبغت الله)
- Tajullah (تاج الله)
- Taimullah (تيم الله)
- Ubayd Allah (عبيد الله)
- Waliullah (ولي الله)
- Yadollah (يد الله)
- Zabihallah (ذبيح الله)
- Zafarullah (طفر الله)
- Zakatullah (Note: Mainly reported in Pakistan (Zakat = alms)) (زكاة الله)

=== ad-Din suffix – Faith, Creed ===
- 'Ala' ud-Din (علاء الدين)
- 'Alim ud-Din (عليم الدين)
- 'Azim ud-Din (عظيم الدين)
- Aftab al-Din (ﺁفتاب الدين)
- Amin ud-Din (أمين الدين)
- Anwaruddin (أنور الدين)
- Asad ud-Din (أسد الدين)
- Awwal ud-Din (أول الدين)
- Azharuddin (أظهر الدين)
- Badr al-Din (بدر الدين)
- Baha' al-Din (بهاء الدين)
- Burhan al-Din (برهان الدين)
- Fakhr al-Din (فخر الدين)
- Fariduddin (فريد الدين)
- Ghiyath al-Din (غياث الدين)
- Hamid al-Din (حميد الدين)
- Haqq ad-Din (حق الدين)
- Hisham ud-Din (هشام الدين)
- Husam ad-Din (حسام الدين)
- Ikhtiyar al-Din (إختيار الدين)
- Imad al-Din (عماد الدين)
- Ismat ad-Din (عصمت الدين)
- Izz al-Din (عز الدين)
- Jalal ad-Din (جلال الدين)
- Jamal ad-Din (جمال الدين)
- Kafil al-Din (كفيل الدين)
- Kamal al-Din (كمال الدين)
- Khair ad-Din (خير الدين)
- Majd ad-Din (مجد الدين)
- Mizan ud-Din (ميزان الدين) (or Mizanuddin)
- Mansur ad-Din (منصور الدين)
- Mu'in al-Din (معين الدين) (or Moinuddin)
- Mu'iz ad-Din (معز الدين) (or Moizuddin)
- Muhyi ud-Din (محيي الدين) (or Mohy al-Din, Mohyeddin)
- Muhib ud-Din (محب الدين)
- Muslih ud-Din (مصلح الدين)
- Najm al-Din (نجم الدين)
- Nasir al-Din (نصير الدين)
- Nazim ud-Dim (ناظم الدين)
- Nizam al-Din (نظام الدين)
- Nur al-Din (نور الدين)
- Qamar ud-Din (قمر الدين)
- Qawwam ud-Din (قوام الدين)
- Qutb ad-Din (قطب الدين)
- Rashid al-Din (رشيد الدين)
- Riazuddin (رياض الدين) (or Riazuddin, Riyad ud-Din)
- Rukn al-Din (ركن الدين)
- Sa'd al-Din (سعد الدين) (or Saad al-Din, Sa'd ud-Din, Saad ud-Din)
- Sabr ad-Din (صبر الدين)
- Sadr al-Din (صدر الدين)
- Safi al-Din (صفي الدين)
- Sayf ud-Din (سيف الدين) (or Saif al-Din)
- Salah ad-Din (صلاح الدين) (or Saladin, Saladdin)
- Shams al-Din (شمس الدين)
- Sharaf al-Din (شرف الدين)
- Shihab al-Din (شهاب الدين)
- Shuja' ud-Din (شجاع الدين) (or Shujauddin)
- Siraj ud-Din (سراج الدين) (or Sirajuddin)
- Taj al-Din (تاج الدين)
- Taqi al-Din (تقي الدين)
- Zahir al-Din (ظهير الدين)
- Zayn ad-Din (زين الدين) (or Zinedine)
- Ziauddin (ضياء الدين) (or Diya ud-Din)

=== Rahman — Compassionate ===
- Abdur Rahman (عبد الرحمن)
- Anisur Rahman (انيس الرحمن)
- Arifur Rahman (عارف الرحمن)
- Ata-ur-Rahman (عطاء الرحمن)
- Azizur Rahman (عزيز الرحمن)
- Fazal ur Rahman (فضل الرحمن)
- Habib ur Rahman (حبيب الرحمن)
- Khalil-ur-Rahman (خليل الرحمن)
- Lutfur Rahman (لطف الرحمن)
- Matiur Rahman (مطيع الرحمن)
- Mizanur Rahman (ميزان الرحمن)
- Mujibur Rahman (مجيب الرحمن)
- Saifur Rahman (سيف الرحمن)
- Shafiq ur Rahman (شفيق الرحمن)
- Shamsur Rahman (شمس الرحمن)
- Ziaur Rahman (ضياء الرحمن)

== Non-Islamic names ==
=== Pre-Islamic ===
- 'Abdul Hajar, "servant of the stone"
- 'Abdul Ka'aba, "servant of the Kaaba"
- 'Abd Manaf, "servant of Manaf"
- 'Abd Manat, "servant of Manat"
- 'Abd Ruda, "servant of Ruda"
- 'Abd Shams, "servant of the sun"
- 'Abdul 'Uzza, "servant of Uzza"
- 'Abd Wadd, "servant of Wadd"
- 'Abd Yaghuth, "servant of Yaghuth"
- Asad Allat, "lion of al-Lat"
- Aws Manat, "gift of Manat"
- Imru' al-Qays, "man of Qays"
- Sa'd Manat, "happiness of Manat"
- Taym Allat, "servant of al-Lat"
- Wahb Allat (Wahbʾalat), "gift of al-Lat"
- Zayd Manat, "abundance of Manat"

=== Arab Christian ===
- Abdul Masih, "servant of the Messiah"
- Abdus Salib, "servant of the Cross"
- Abdush Shahid, "servant of the Martyr"
- Saliba, "of the cross"
- Nur al-Masih, "light of the Messiah"
- Nur ud-Dunya, "light of the world"
