= Abdul Matin =

Abdul Matin (also spelled Abdul Mateen) may refer to:

- Abdul Matin (poet) (died 1938), poet, author, statesman, administrator
- A. T. M. Abdul Mateen (1925–2001), Bangladesh economist and politician
- Abdul Matin (detainee), high school science teacher who was held in Guantanamo for six years based on suspicions he was a Taliban leader
- Abdul Matin (Taliban leader) (c. 1960–2008), Taliban leader who was killed in combat in Kandahar
- Abdul Matin (language activist) (1926–2014), language activist in Bangladesh
- Abdul Matin, a pseudonym of Indonesian terrorism suspect Dulmatin (1970–2010)
- Abdul Matin Chaudhary (1895–1948), Bengali politician and minister
- Abdul Matin Chowdhury (1921–1981), Bangladeshi academic and physicist
- Abdul Matin Chowdhury (politician) (1944–2012), Bangladeshi politician
- Abdul Matin Chowdhury (scholar) (1915–1990), Bangladeshi religious scholar and political activist
- Abdul Matin (actor) (born 1980), a Nepalese actor
- Abdul Matin (general), a Bangladeshi army general
- Mohammed Abdul Matin (born 1932), Bangladeshi politician
- Abdul Matin (politician), Bandladeshi politician
- Prince Mateen Bolkiah (born 1991), also known as Prince Abdul Mateen of Brunei
- Yahya Abdul-Mateen II (born 1986), American actor
