= Matin (surname) =

Matin is a surname. Notable people with the surname include:

- Abdul Karim Matin, Pashtun politician
- Abdul Matin (actor) (born 1980), Nepali actor
- Abdul Matin (language activist) (born 1926), Bangladeshi language activist
- Abdul Matin (poet), Indian poet
- Abdul Matin (politician), Bangladeshi politician
- Abdul Matin (Taliban leader), Afghan Taliban leader
- Ahmad Matin-Daftari (1897–1971), Iranian Prime Minister
- M. A. Matin (officer), Bangladeshi army officer
- M.A. Matin (politician) (died 2012), Bangladeshi politician
