= Abdul Jamal =

Abdur Jamal is a masculine Muslim name. Abdur Jamal, Abdul Jamal, or variants may refer to:

- Abdul Jamal Shah of Pahang (died 1575), the ninth Sultan of Pahang
- Temenggong Abdul Jamal (1720–1802), the first Temenggong of Johor

== See also ==
- Abdul Jalal, chief of police, Kunar Province, Afghanistan
- Abdul Jamil, a Muslim given name of Arabic origin
