= Batin =

Batin (Arabic: بَاطِن) may refer to "Al-Batin", one of the names of God in Islam. It may also refer to:

== People ==
- Batin Shah (born 1991), Afghan cricketer
- Abdul Batin, multiple people

== Places ==
- Batin (Posušje), a village near Posušje, West Herzegovina Canton, Bosnia and Herzegovina
- Al-Batin F.C., a football club based in Hafar al-Batin, Saudi Arabia
- Wadi al-Batin, an intermittent river in Saudi Arabia and Kuwait
- Batin, Bulgaria, a village in Borovo, Ruse Province, Bulgaria
- Batin, a village in Unguraş Commune, Cluj County, Romania

== Other uses ==
- Al-Batin, a name of God in Islam, meaning "Hidden" or "Unmanifest"
- Batin (Islam), the interior or hidden meaning of the Quran
- Batin (surname)
- Batin people, an ethnic group in Jambi Province on the island of Sumatra, Indonesia

== See also ==
- Batiniyya, an esoteric sect of Shi'i Islam
- Gunung Batin Airport in Astraksetra, South Sumatra, Indonesia
- Hafar al-Batin, a city in Saudi Arabia
- Battle of Wadi al-Batin
- Battle of Hafr al-Batin
- Umm Batin, a Bedouin village in Israel
