= Abd al-Hafiz =

ʻAbd al-Ḥafīẓ (ALA-LC romanization of Arabic: عبد الحفيظ) is a Muslim male given name, and in modern usage, surname. It is built from the Arabic words ʻabd and al-Ḥafīẓ, one of the names of God in the Qur'an, which give rise to the Muslim theophoric names. It means "servant of the Guardian" or “servant of the preserver”.

It may refer to:

- Abdul Hafeez, known as Senior Brigadier General of Pakistan ( 1954 ) Pakistani Social Activist
- Abdul Hafiz Mohamed Barakatullah, known as Maulavi Barkatullah (1854–1927), Indian independence activist
- Abu Ahmad Abdul Hafiz (1900–1985), Bengali politician and lawyer
- Abdelhafid of Morocco (1873–1937), Sultan of Morocco
- Abdul Hafeez (chemist) (1882–1964), Pakistani scientist
- Abdul Hafiz (VC) (1915–1944), Indian army soldier
- Osman Abdel Hafeez (1917–1958), Egyptian fencer
- Abdul Hafeez Kardar, or just Abdul Kardar (1925–1996), Pakistani cricketer
- Abdelhafid Boussouf (1926–1980), Algerian politician
- Abdul Hafiz (Lieutenant General) (born 1957), Lieutenant General of Bangladesh Army
- Abdul Hafiz Mansoor (born 1963), Afghan politician
- Abdelhafid Tasfaout (born 1969), Algerian footballer
- Yasser Abdel Hafez (born 1969), Egyptian novelist and journalist
- Sayed Abdel Hafeez (born 1977), Egyptian footballer
- Abdul Hafeez (English cricketer) (born 1977)
- Abdelhafid Benchabla (born 1986), Algerian boxer
- Abd-al-Hafid Mahmud al-Zulaytini, Libyan politician
- Abdul Hafeez Shaikh, Pakistani politician
- Abdul Hafiz Pirzada, Pakistani lawyer and politician
- Abdul Hafeez (al Qaeda leader), see Muhanad Mahmoud Al Farekh
- Md. Abdul Hafiz, Bangladeshi politician
- Muhammad Abdul Hafiz, Bangladeshi judge
- M. Abdul Hafiz, Bangladeshi military officer
