= Comparative air force enlisted ranks of Arabophone countries =

Rank comparison chart of Non-commissioned officer and enlisted ranks for air forces of Arabophone states.

== Other ranks ==
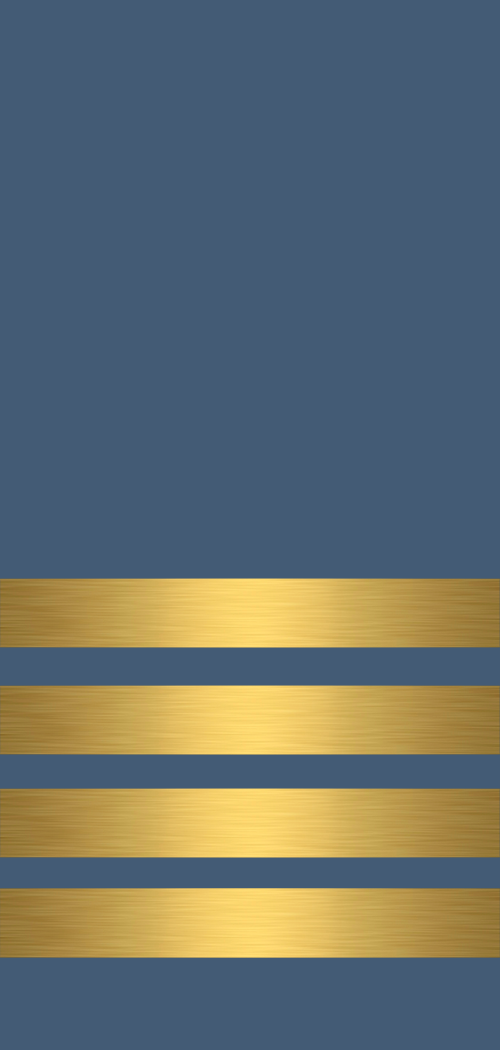
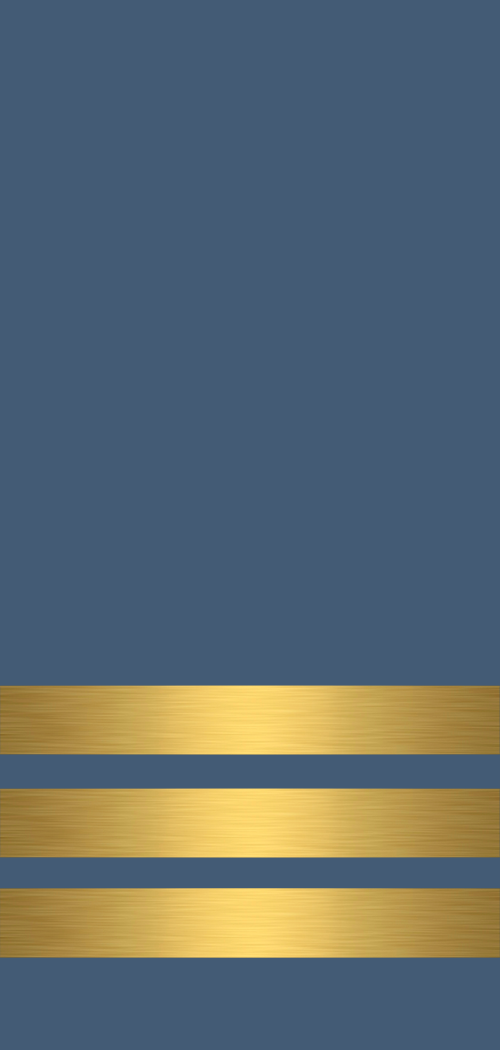
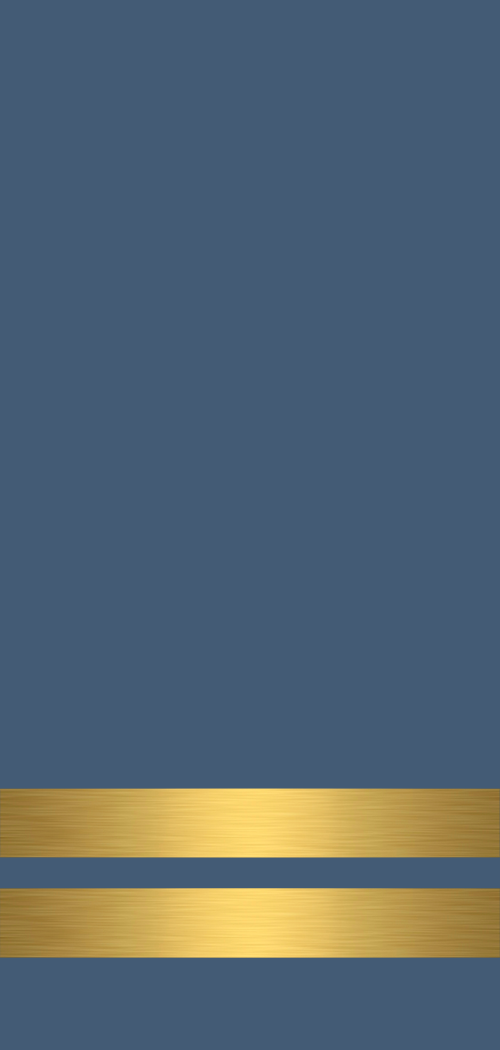
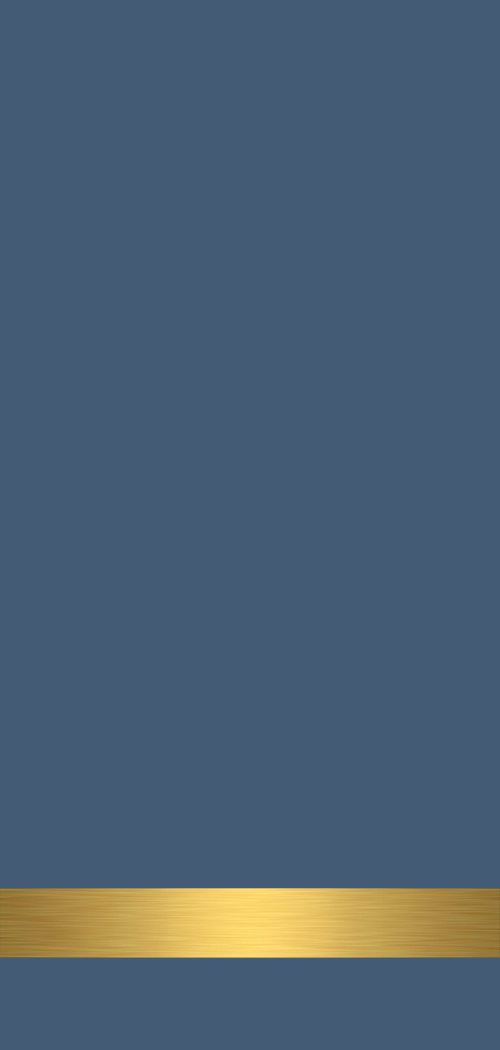
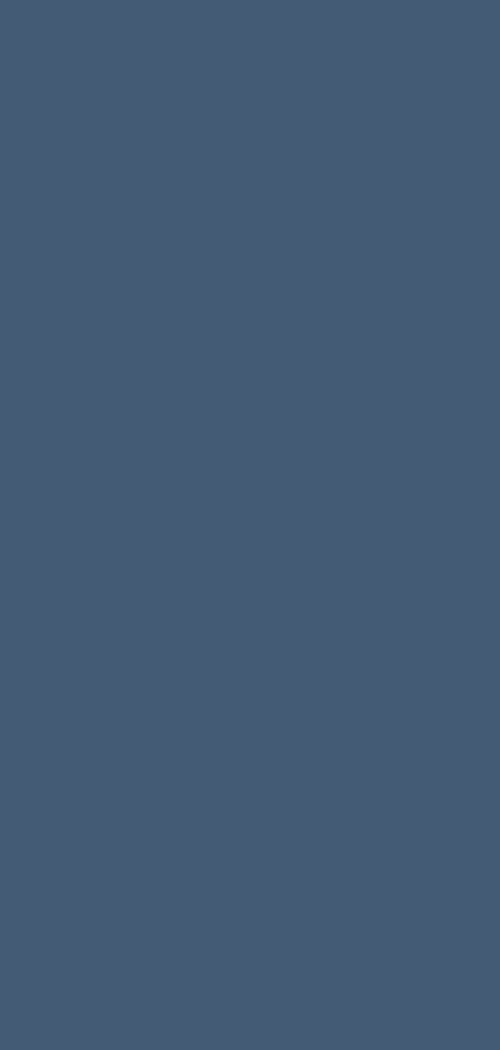
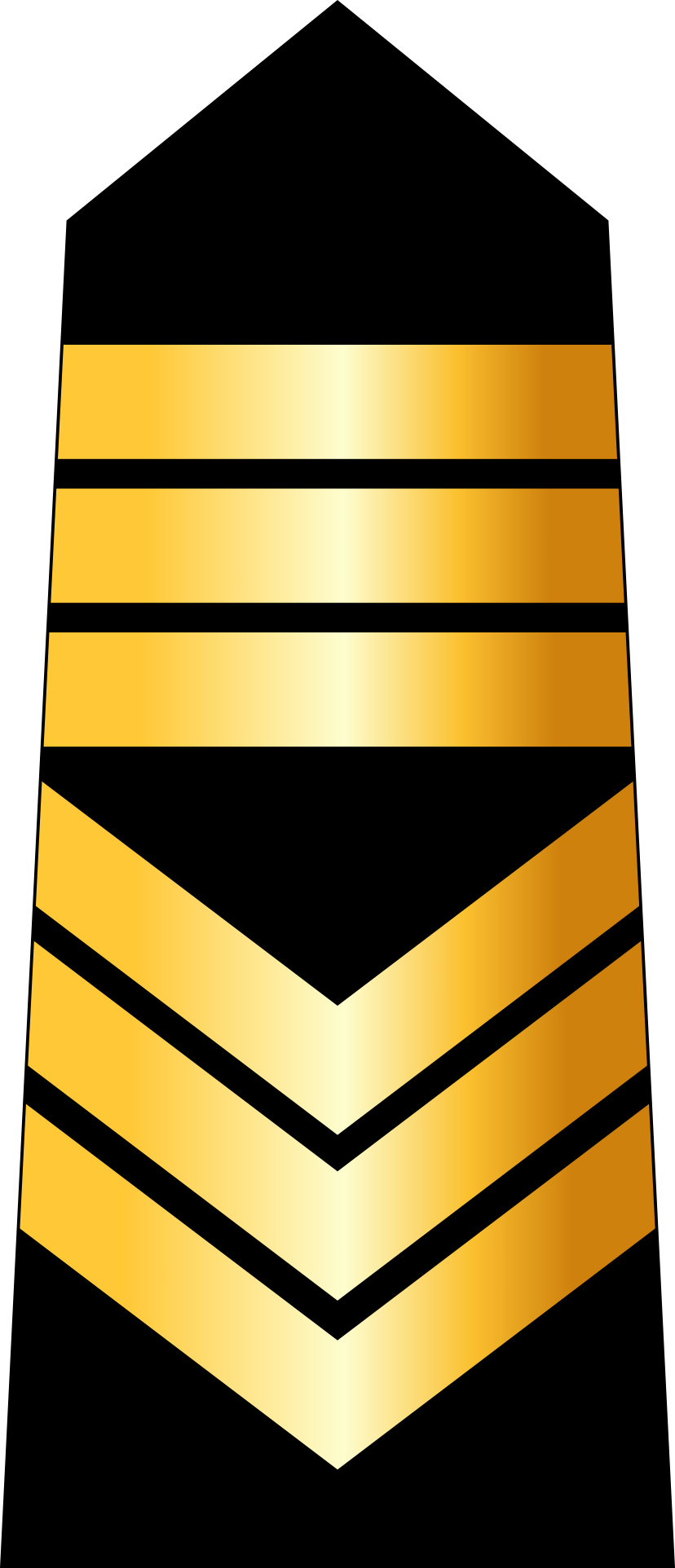
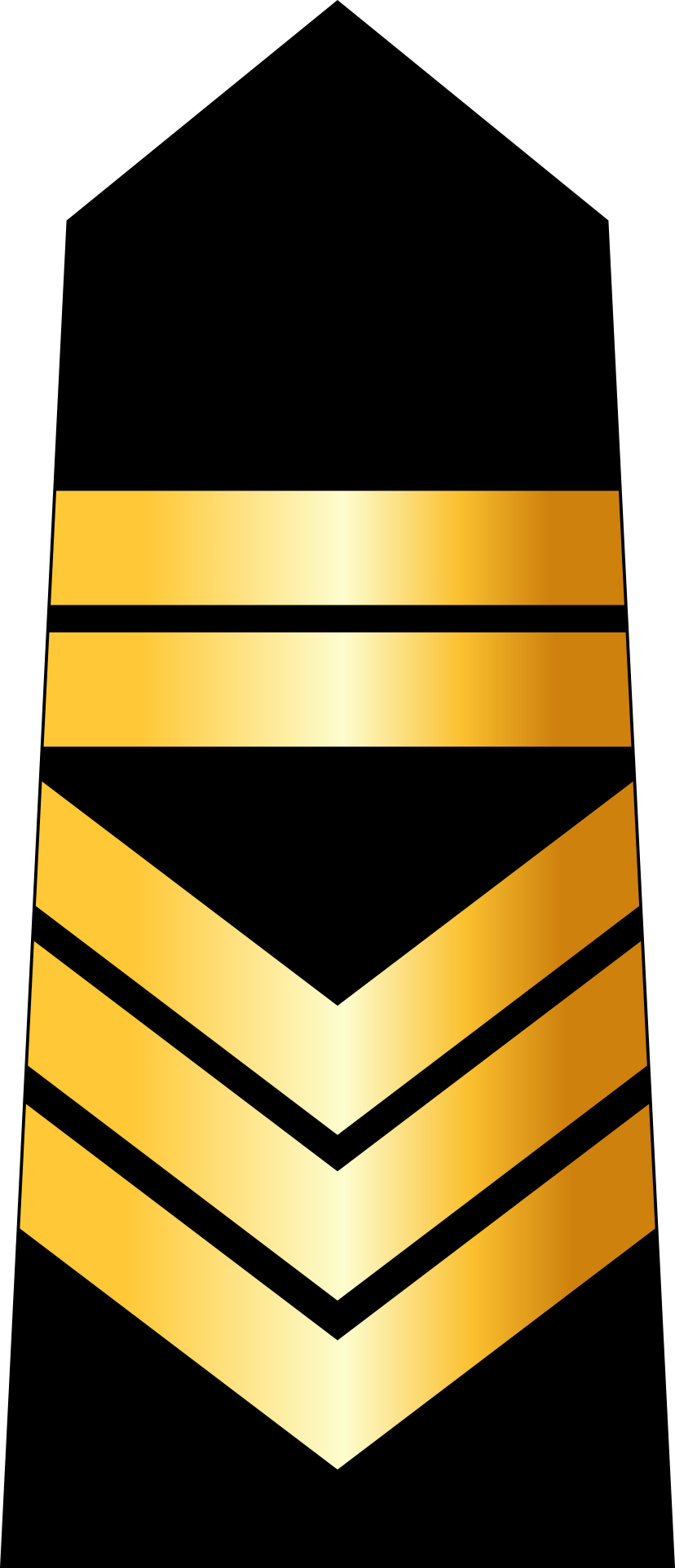
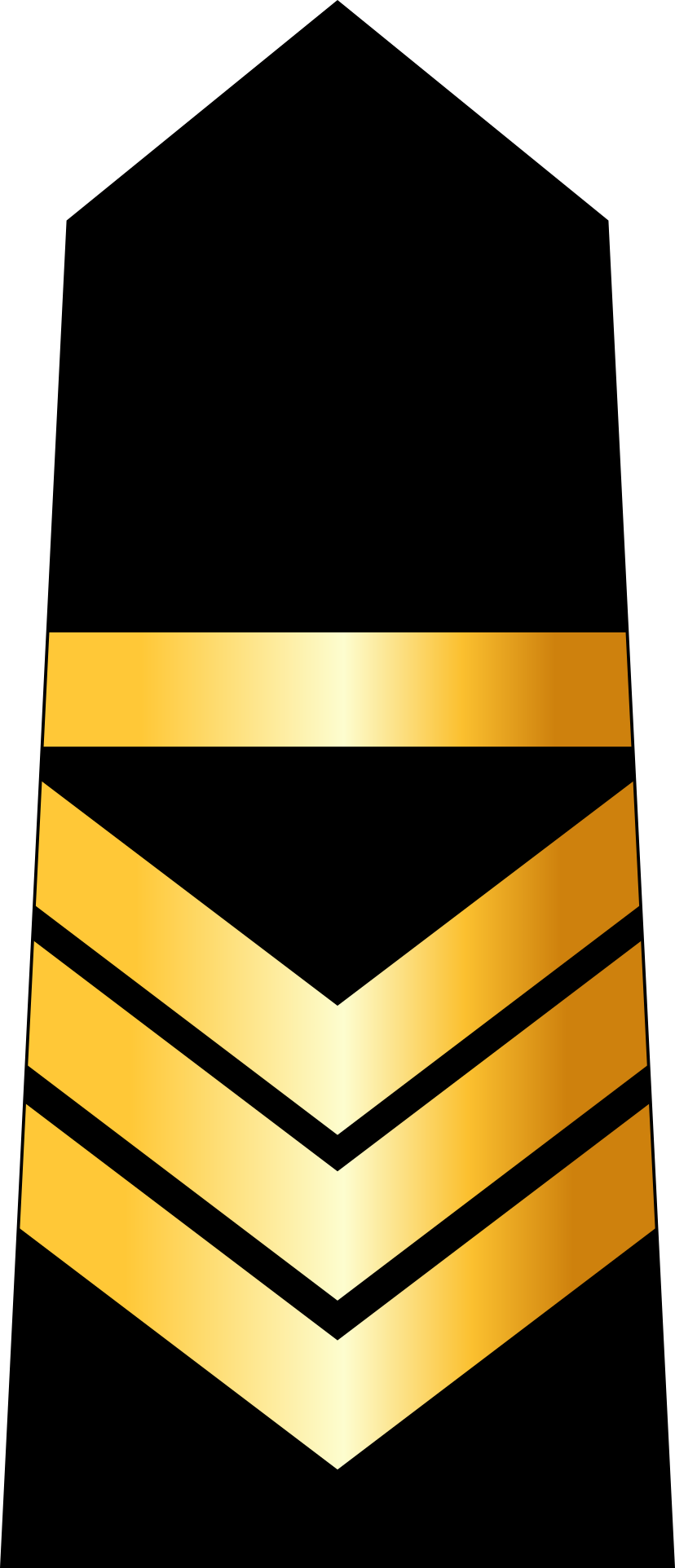
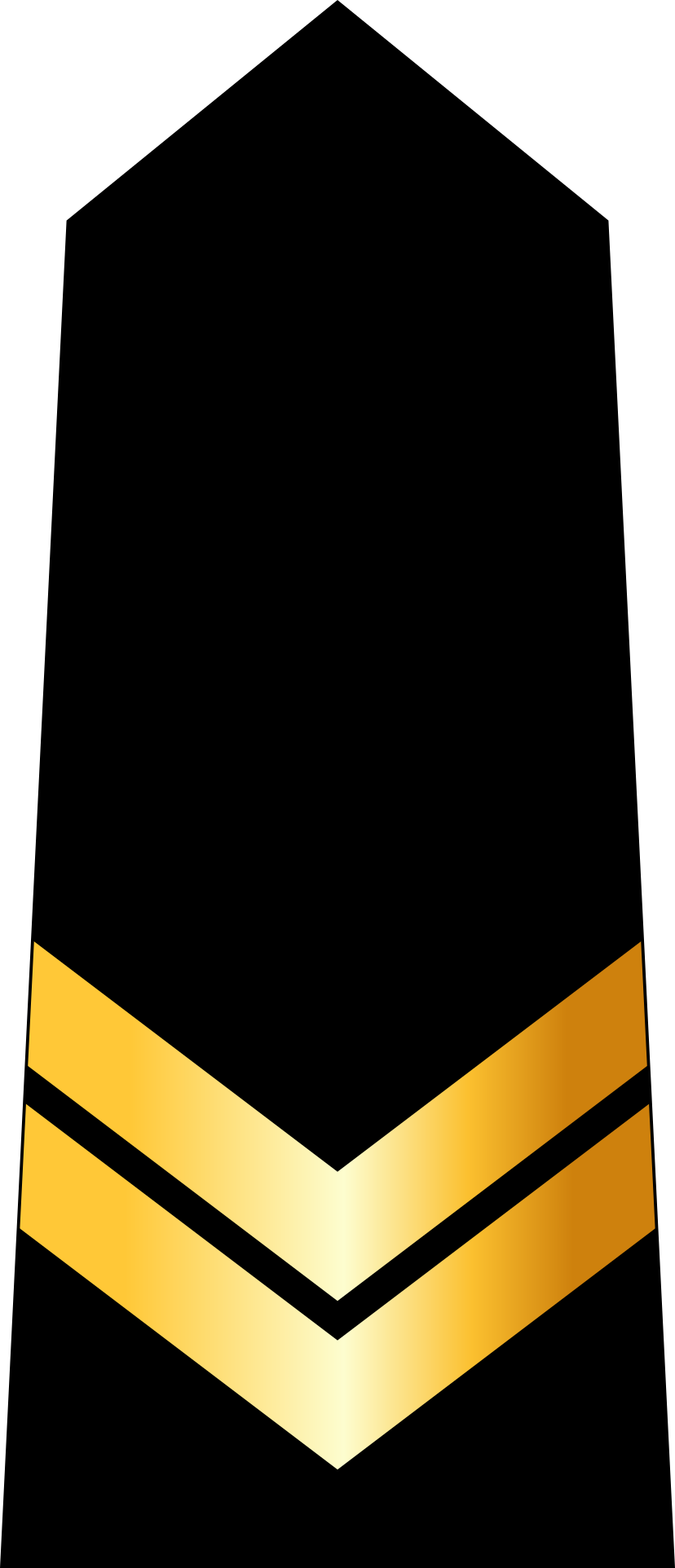
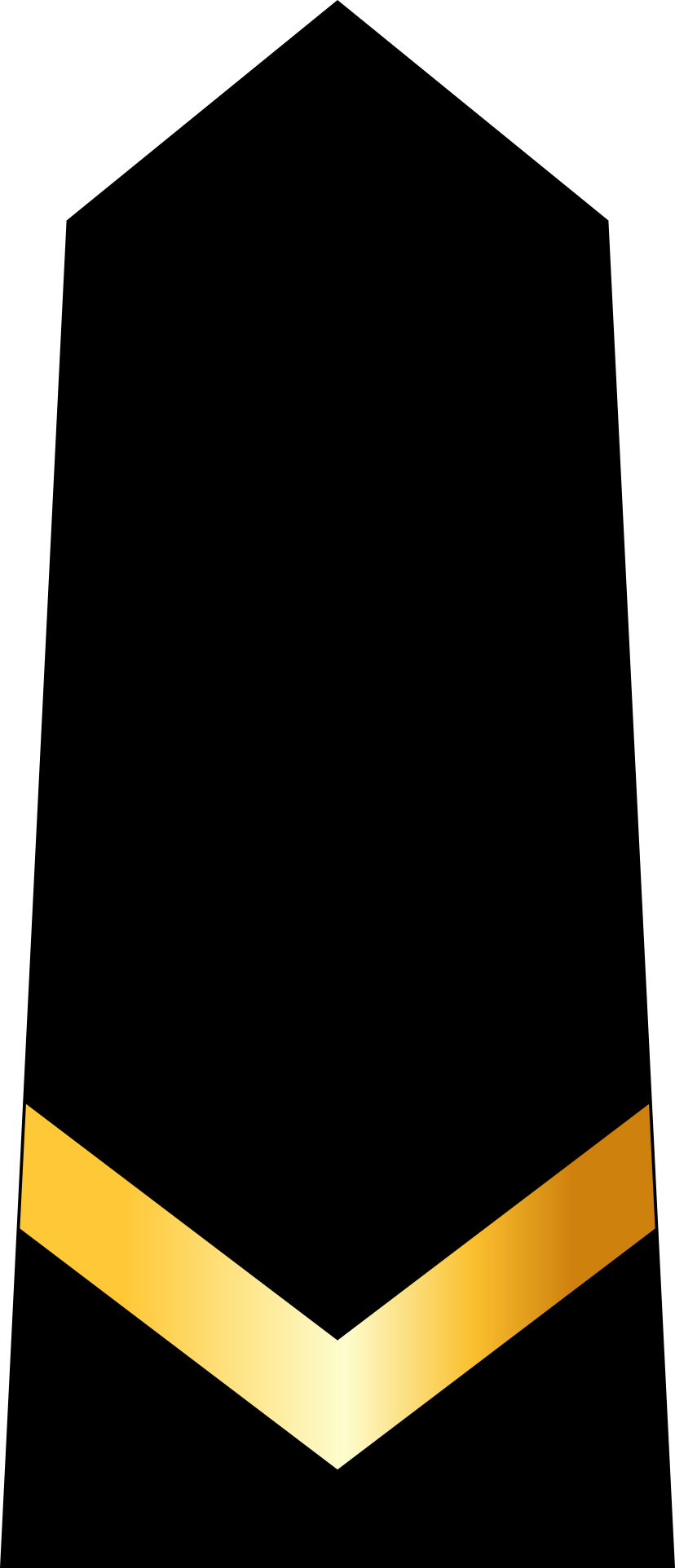
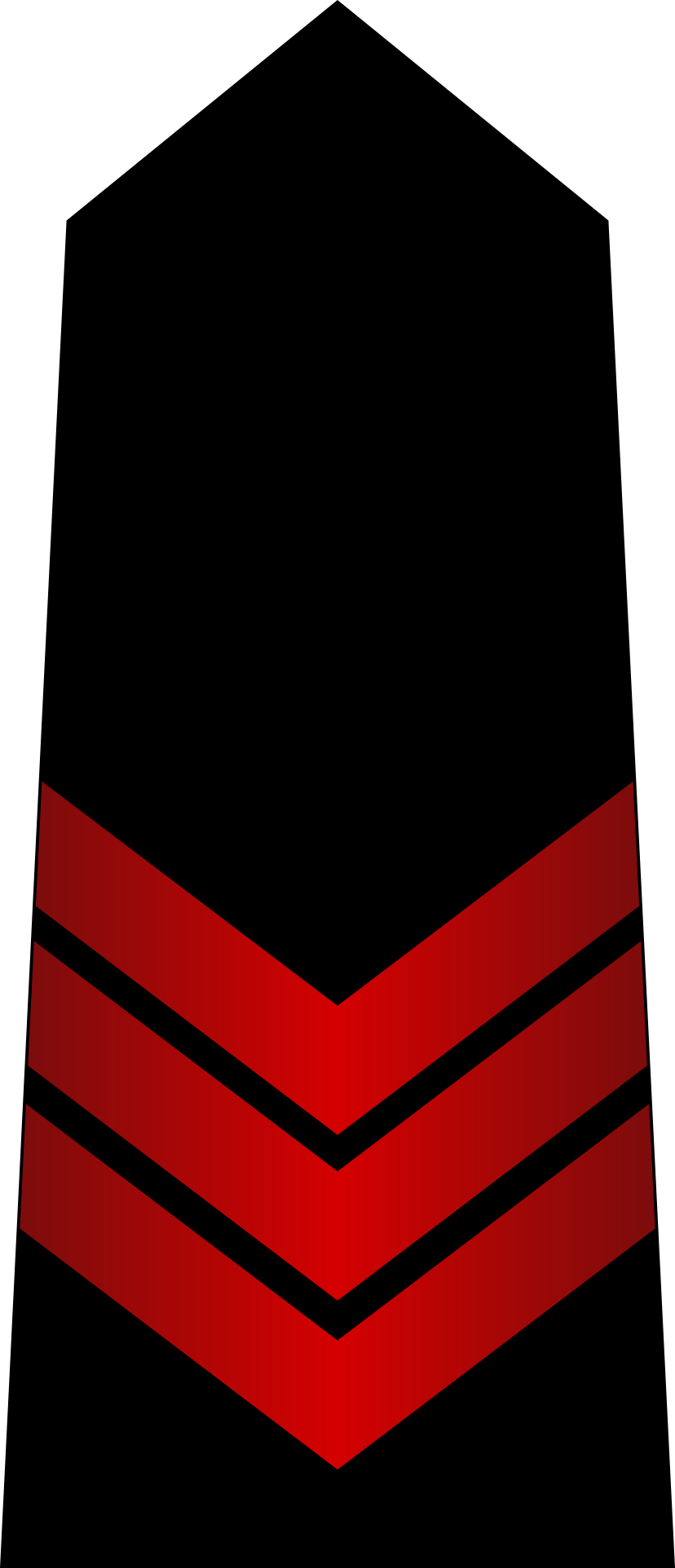
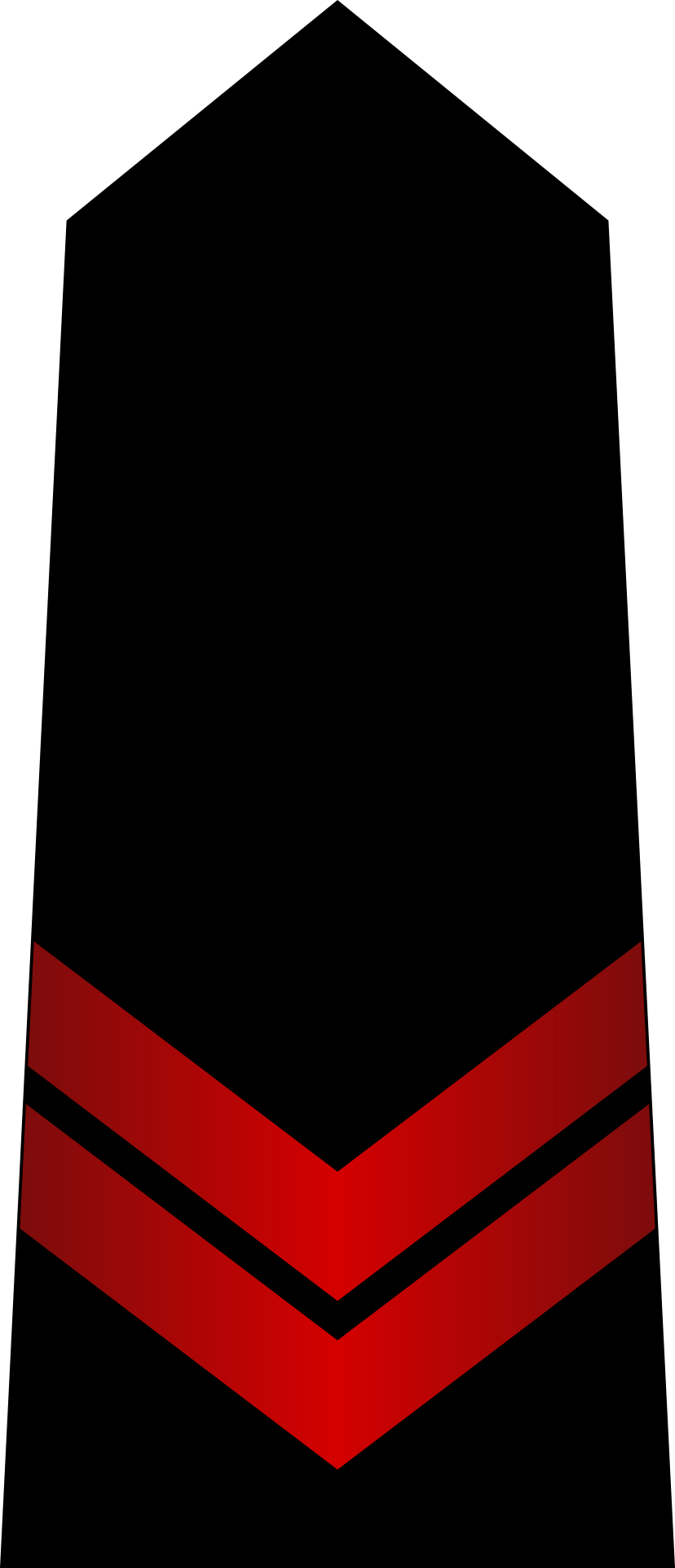
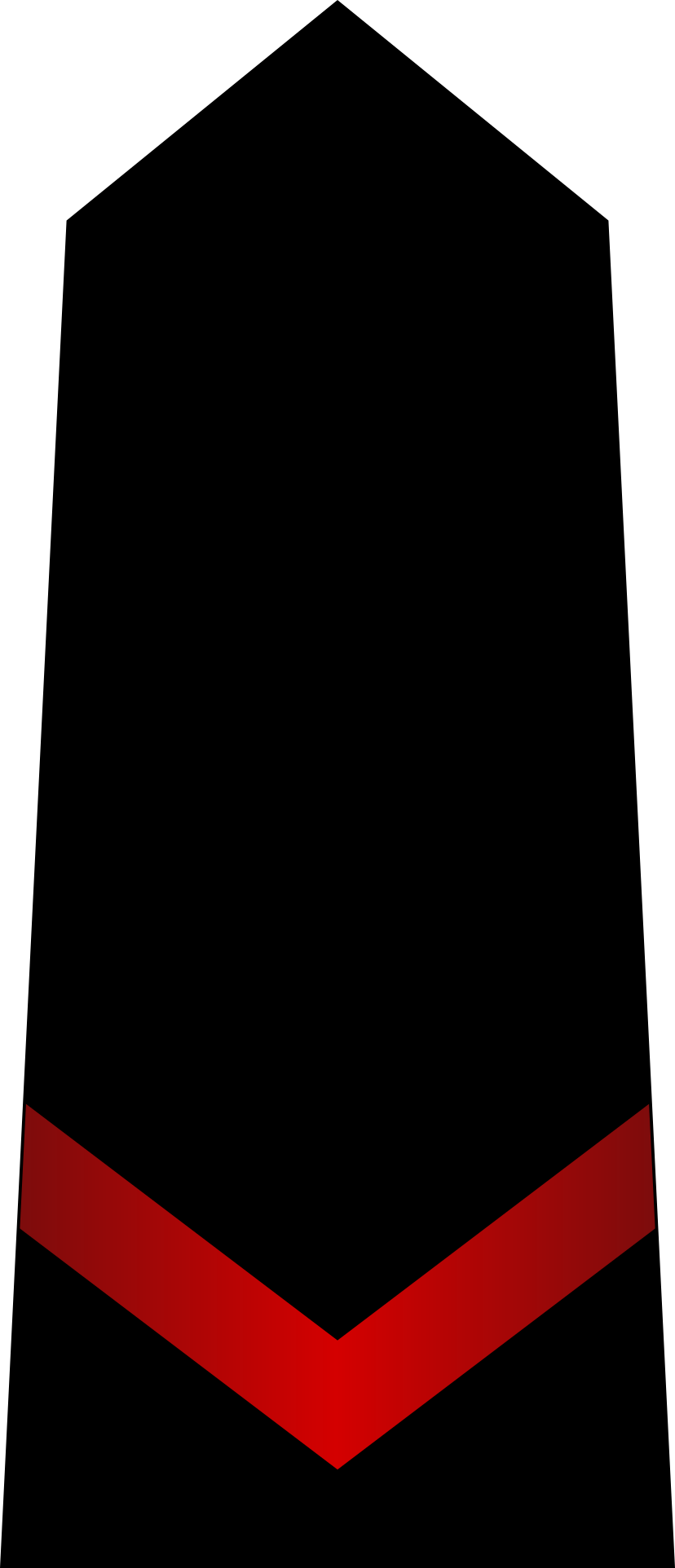
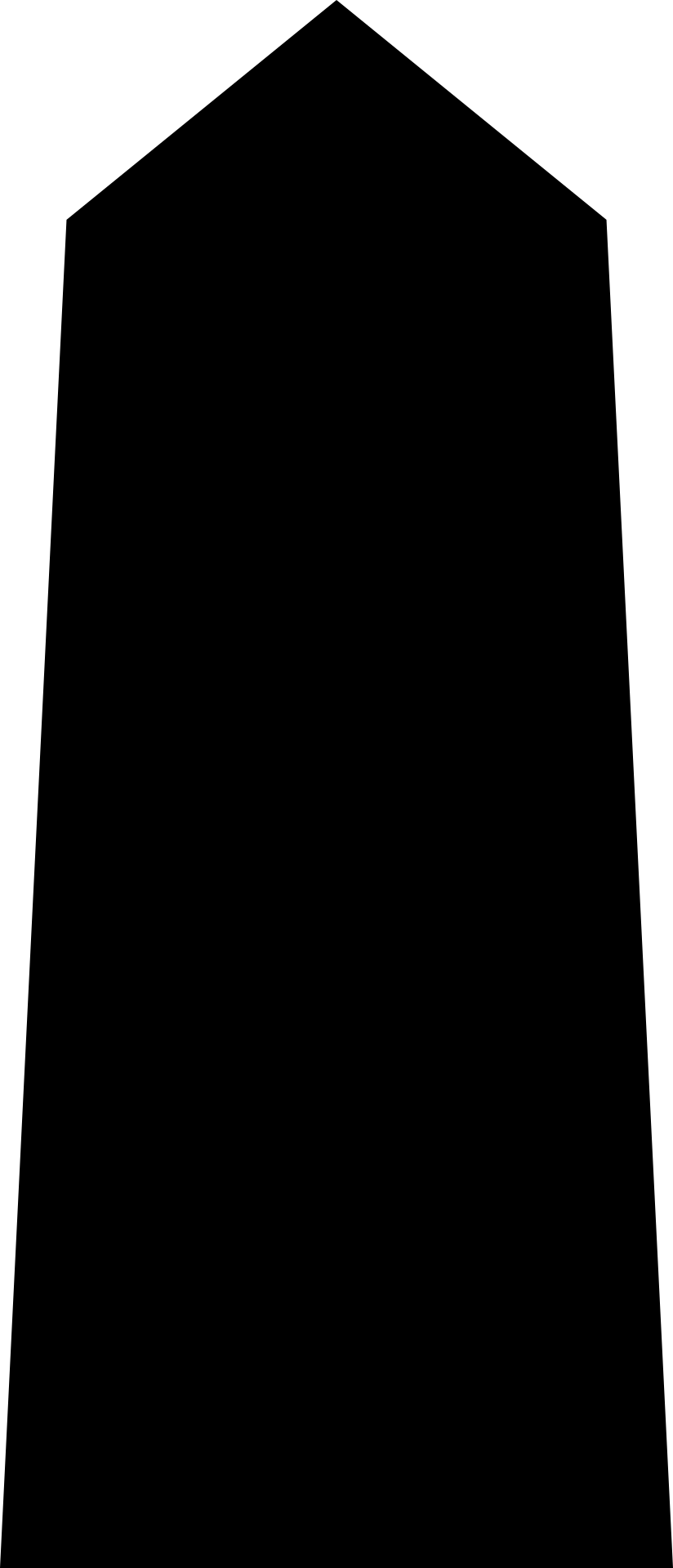
Rank group	Senior NCOs							Junior NCOs		Enlisted
Algerian Air Force											No insignia
Algerian Air Force	مساعد أول; Mosa'id awwal			مساعد; Mosa'id		رقيب أول; Raqib awwal	رقيب; Raqib	عريف أول; Earif 'awal	عريف; Earif		جندي; Jundiun
Algerian Air Force	Adjudant chef			Adjudant		Sergent chef	Sergent	Caporal chef	Caporal		Djoundi
Royal Bahraini Air Force											No insignia
Royal Bahraini Air Force					رقیب أول; Raqib 'awal		رقیب; Raqib	عريف; Earif		جندي أول; Jundiun awwal	جندي; Jundiun
Chadian Air Force											No insignia
Chadian Air Force					Sergent major	Sergent-chef	Sergent		Caporal	Soldat première	Soldat
Djibouti Air Force
Djibouti Air Force	Adjudant-chef			Adjudant		Sergent-chef	Sergent	Caporal-chef	Caporal	Soldat première	Soldat
Egyptian Air Force
Egyptian Air Force	مساعد أول; Mosa'id awwal			مساعد; Mosa'id	رقيب أول; Raqib awwal	رقيب; Raqib		عريف 'arif		جندي; Jundi
Iraqi Air Force
Iraqi Air Force					رقيب أول; Raqib 'awal	رقیب; Raqib		عريف; Earif		جندي أول; Jundiun awwal	جندي; Jundiun
Royal Jordanian Air Force											No insignia
Royal Jordanian Air Force	وكيل أول; Wakil 'awal			وكيل; Wakil	رقيب أول; Raqib 'awal	رقیب; Raqib		عريف; Earif		جندي أول; Jundiun awwal	جندي; Jundiun
Rank group	Senior NCOs							Junior NCOs		Enlisted
Kuwait Air Force											No insignia
Kuwait Air Force	وكيل أول; Wakil 'awal			وكيل; Wakil	رقيب أول; Raqib 'awal	رقیب; Raqib		عريف; Earif		جندي أول; Jundiun awwal	جندي; Jundiun
Lebanese Air Force											No insignia
Lebanese Air Force	مؤهل أول; Muahal 'awal	مؤهل; Muahal	معاون أوّل; Maawan 'awal	معاون; Maawan		رقيب أوّل; Raqib awwl	رقيب; Raqīb	عريف أول; Earif 'awal	عريف; Earif	جندي أول; Jundiun 'awal	جندي; Jundiun
Libyan Air Force											No insignia
Libyan Air Force				Master sergeant		Staff Sergeant	Sergeant	Corporal		Airman	Airman basic
Malian Air Force
Malian Air Force	Major		Adjudant-chef	Adjudant		Sergent-chef	Sergent	Caporal-chef	Caporal	Soldat de première classe	Soldat
Mauritania Islamic Air Force
Mauritania Islamic Air Force	مساعد أول; Mosa'id awwal			مساعد; Mosa'id		رقيب أول; Raqib awwal	رقيب; Raqib		عريف 'arif		جندي; Jundiun
Royal Moroccan Air Force											No insignia
Royal Moroccan Air Force	Adjudant-chef			Adjudant	Sergent-major	Sergent-chef	Sergent	Caporal-chef	Caporal	Soldat de première classe	Soldat de deuxième classe
Royal Air Force of Oman										No insignia
Royal Air Force of Oman	وکیل کتیبة; Wakil katiba			وکیل; Wakil	رقیب اول; Raqib 'awal	رقیب; Raqib		عریف; Earif	نائب عریف; Nayib earif	جندي; Jundiun
Qatar Emiri Air Force										No insignia
Qatar Emiri Air Force	وكيل اول; Wakil awwal			وكيل ثاني; Wakil thani	رقيب; Raqib	نائب; Nayib		عريف; Earif	وكيل عريف; Wakil earif	جندي; Jundi
Royal Saudi Air Force											No insignia
Royal Saudi Air Force	رئيس رقباء; Rayiys ruqaba'			رقيب أول; Raqib 'awal	رقيب; Raqib	وكيل رقيب; Wakil raqib		عريف; Earif		جندي أول; Jundiun awwal	جندي; Jundiun
Rank group	Senior NCOs							Junior NCOs		Enlisted
Somali Air Force										No insignia
Somali Air Force	Musharax sarkaal		Sadex xarígle	Laba xarígle	Xarígle	Sadex alífle		Laba alífle	Alífle	Dable
Sudanese Air Force										No insignia
Sudanese Air Force				مساعد; Mosa'id	رقيب أول; Raqib awwal	رقيب; Raqib		عريف 'arif	وكيل عريف; Wakil 'arif	جندي; Jundiun
Syrian Air Force											No insignia
Syrian Air Force	مساعد أول; Musaeid 'awal		مساعد ثاني; Musaeid thani	مساعد; Musaeid	رقيب أول; Raqib 'awal	رقيب ثاني; Raqib thani	رقيب; Raqib	عريف; Earif		جندي أول; Jundiun 'awal	جندي; Jundiun
Tunisian Air Force
Tunisian Air Force	وكيل أعلى; Wakil 'aelaa		وكيل أول; Wakil 'awal	وكيل; Wakil		عريف أول; Earif 'awal	عريف; Earif	رقيب أول; Raqib 'awal	رقيب; Raqib	جندي أول; Jundiun awwal	جندي متطوع; Jundiun
Tunisian Air Force	Major		Adjudant-chef	Adjudant		Sergent-chef	Sergent	Caporal-chef	Caporal	Soldat de 1^{re} classe	Soldat
United Arab Emirates Air Force											No insignia
United Arab Emirates Air Force				مساعد أول; Musa'id 'awal	مساعد; Musa'id		رقیب; Raqib	عريف; Earif		جندي أول; Jundi awwal	جندي; Jundi
Yemeni Air Force											No insignia
Yemeni Air Force	Warrant officer				Flight sergeant	Sergeant		Senior Airman	Airman First Class		Airman جندي
Rank group	Senior NCOs							Junior NCOs		Enlisted
