= Comparative army enlisted ranks of Arabophone countries =

Rank comparison chart of Non-commissioned officer and enlisted ranks for armies/land forces of Arabophone states.

== Other ranks ==
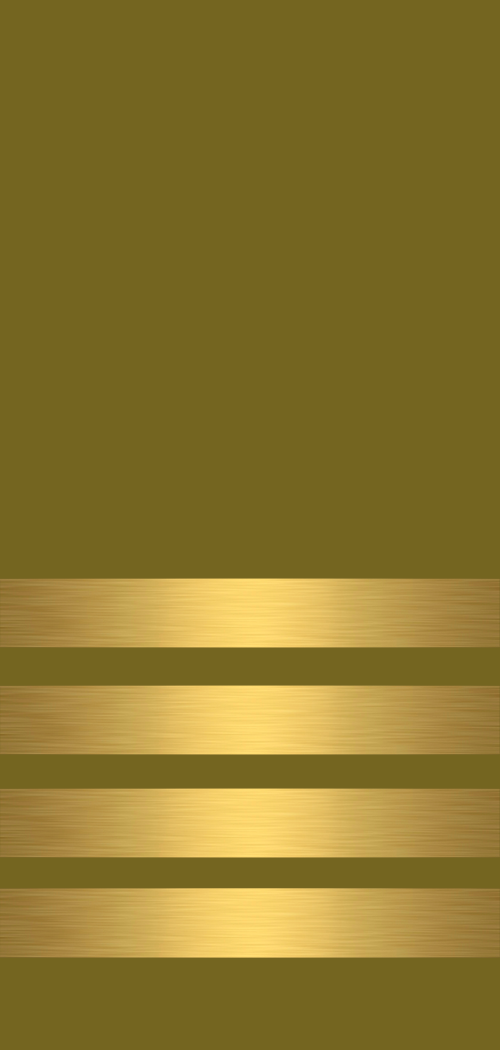
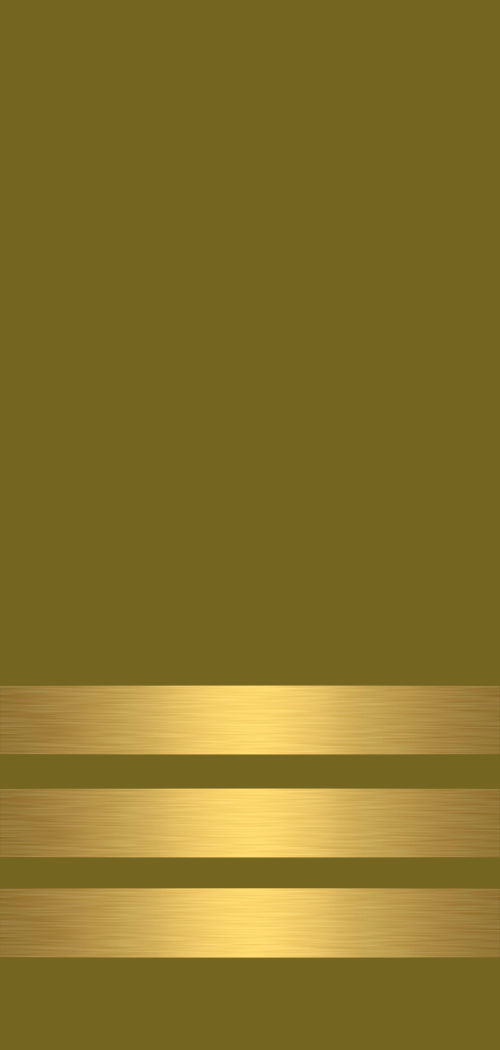
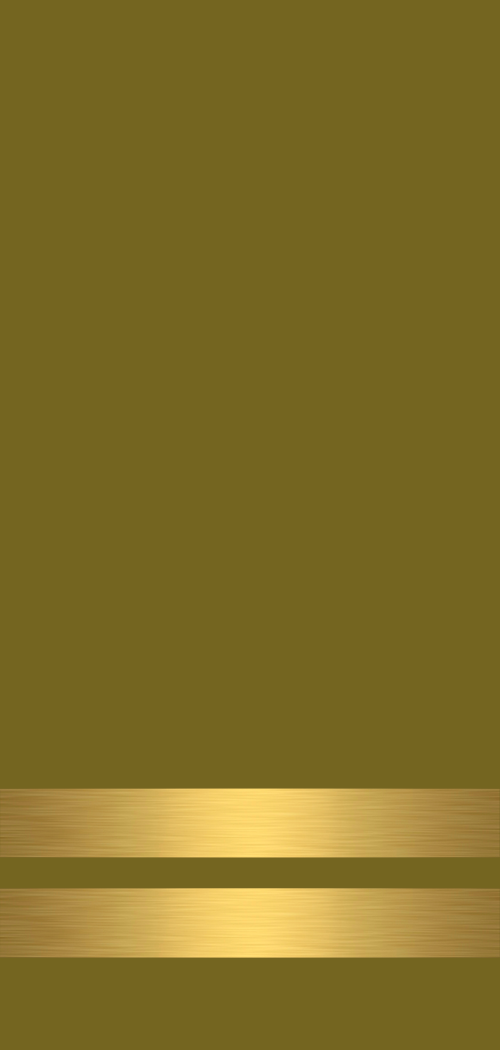
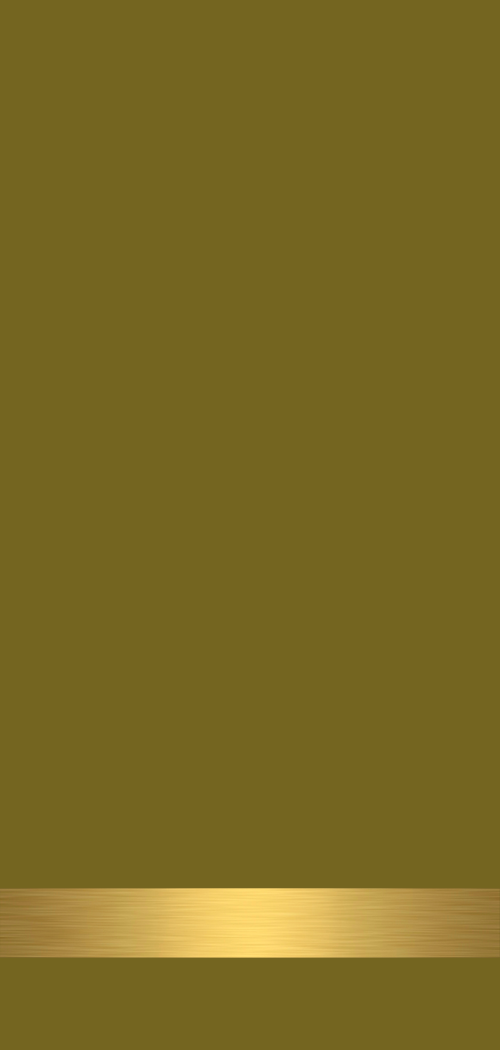
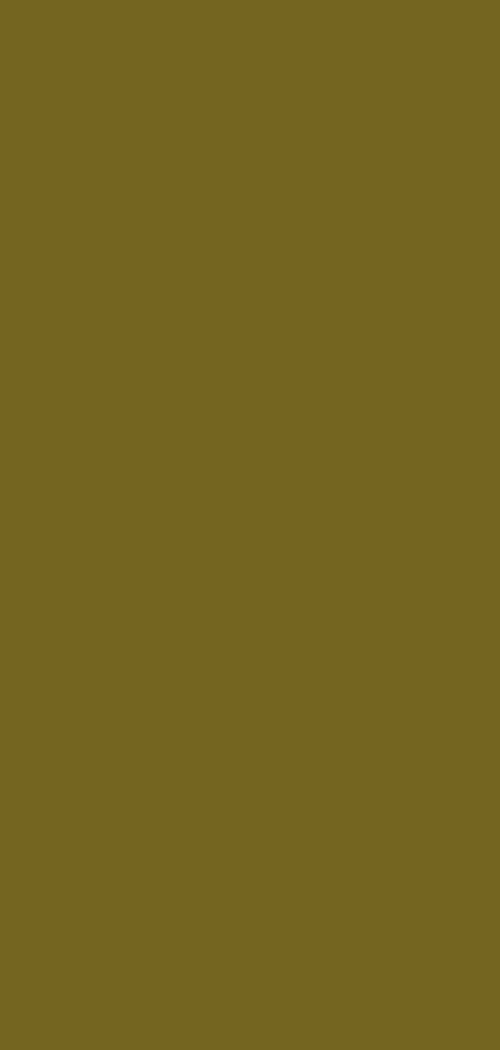
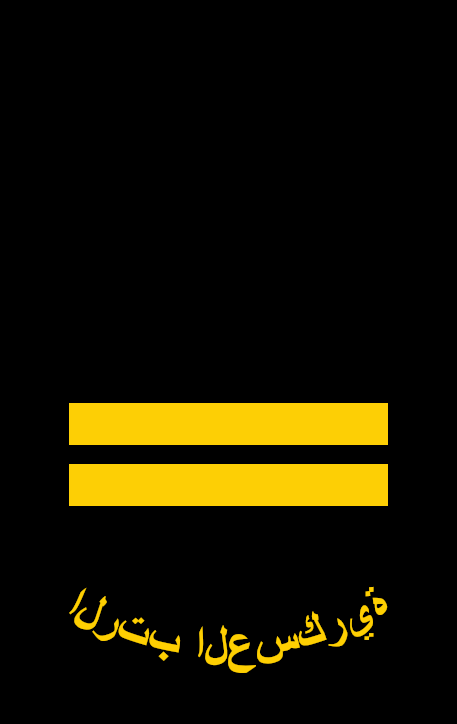
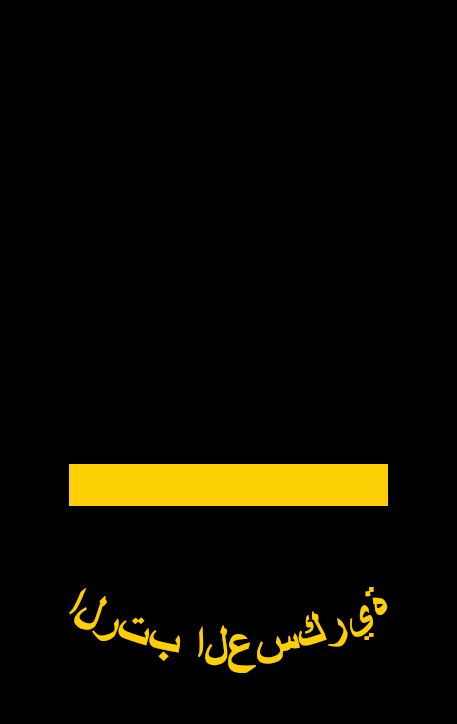
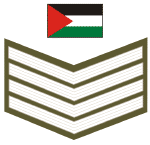
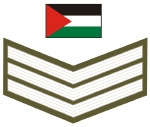
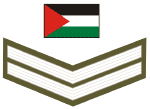
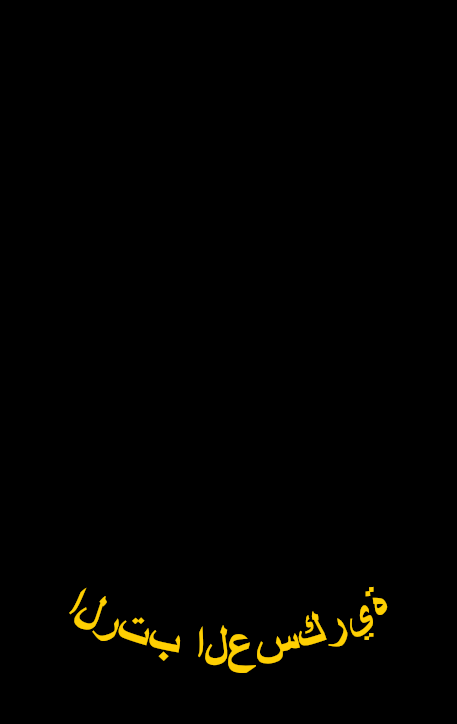
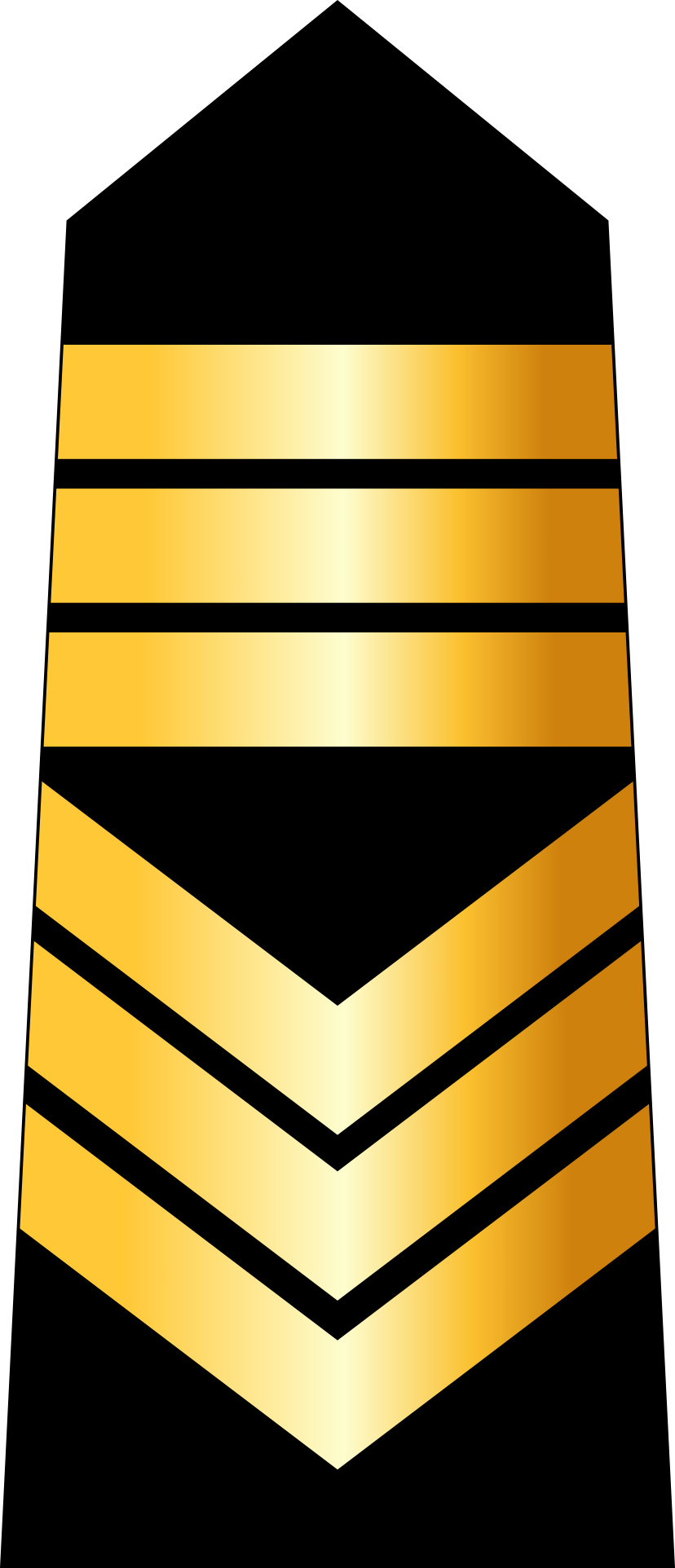
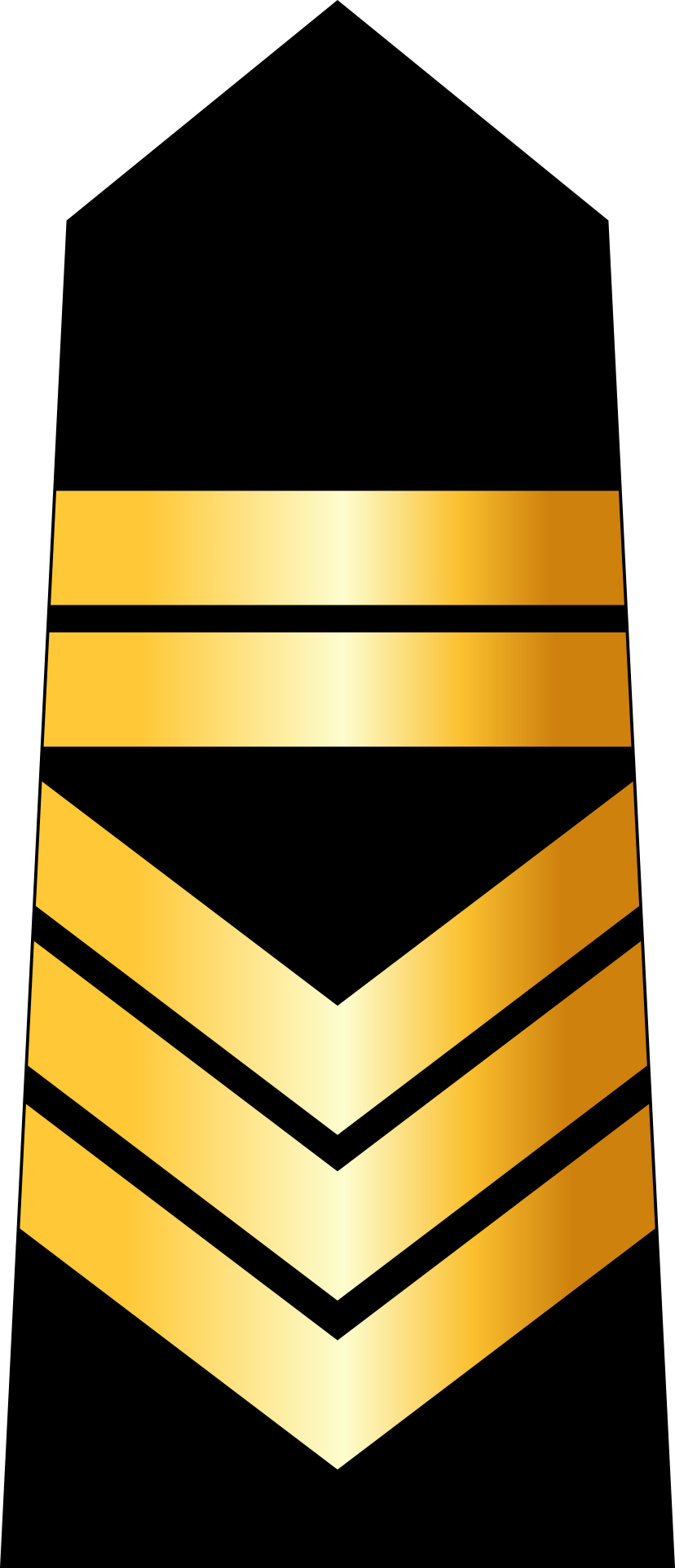
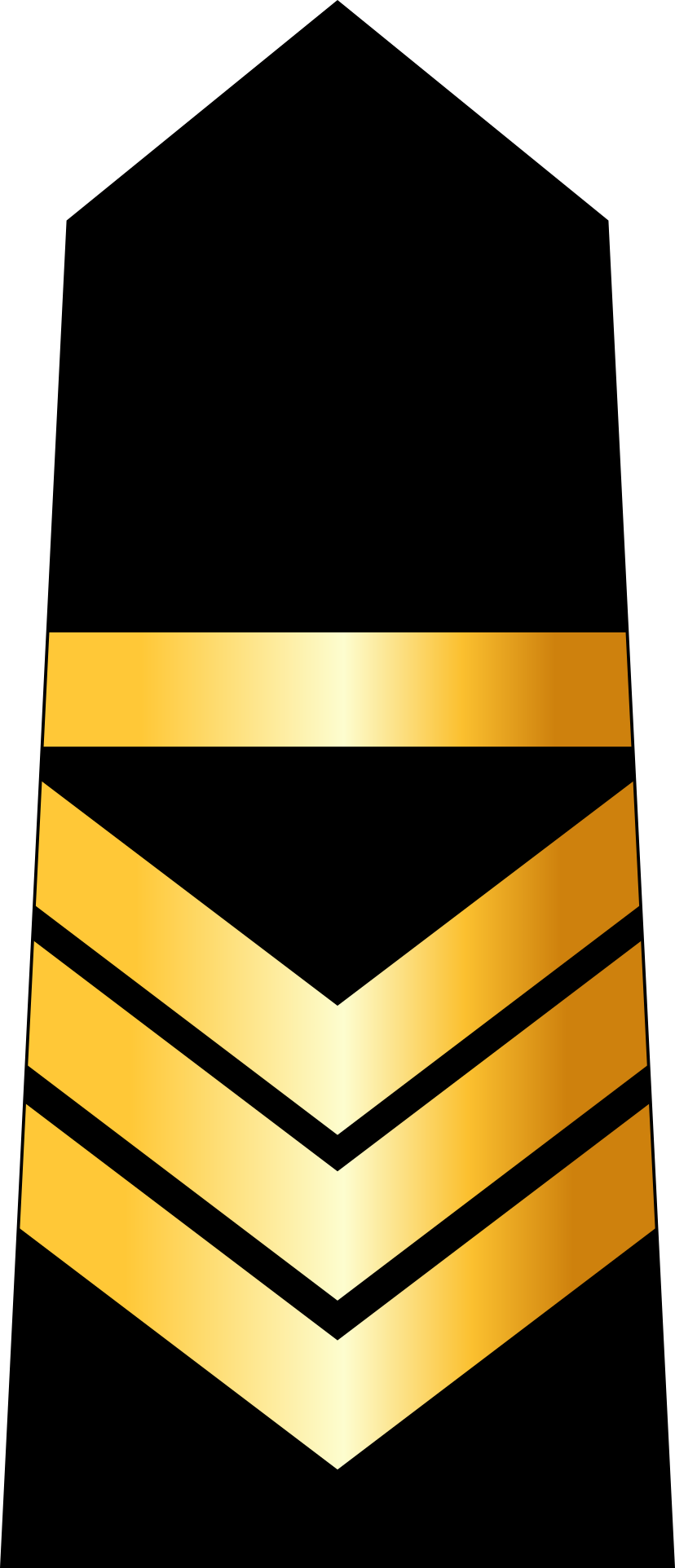
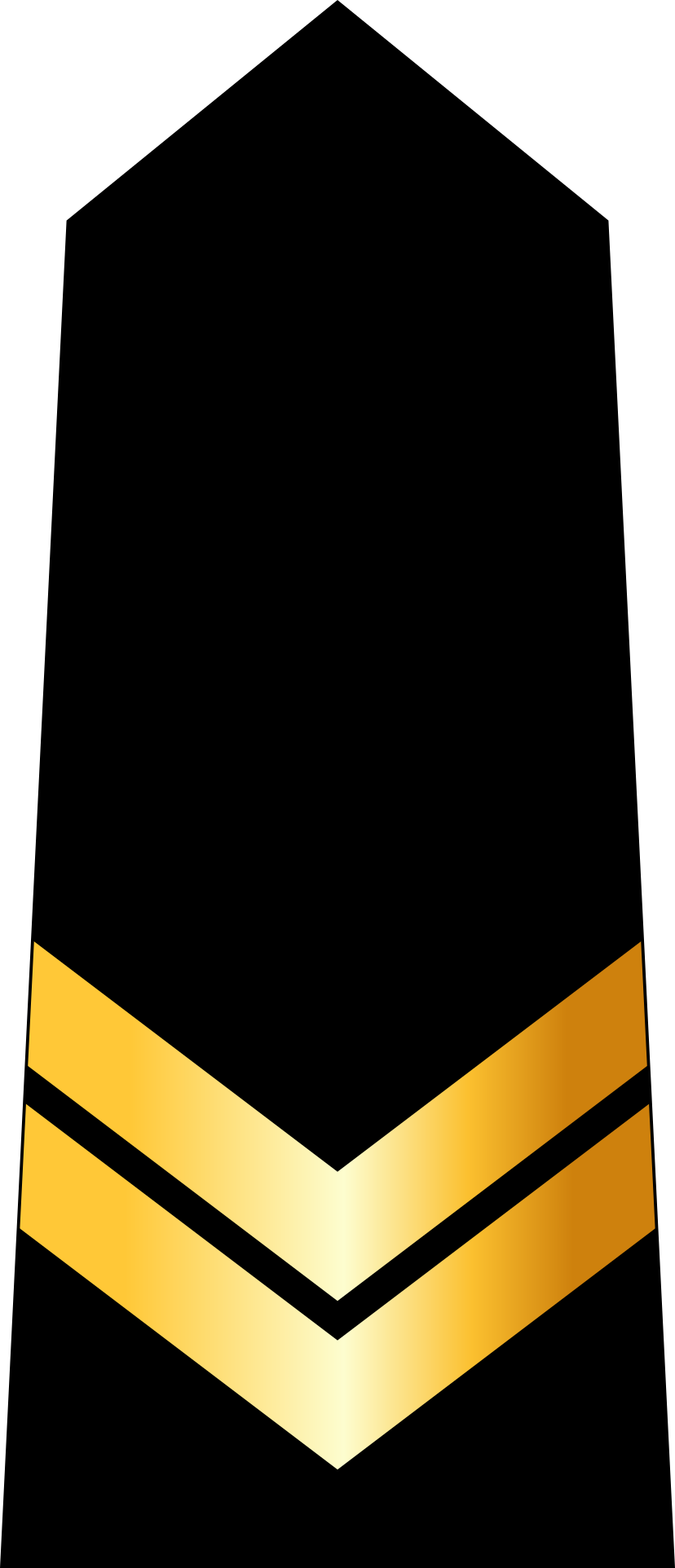
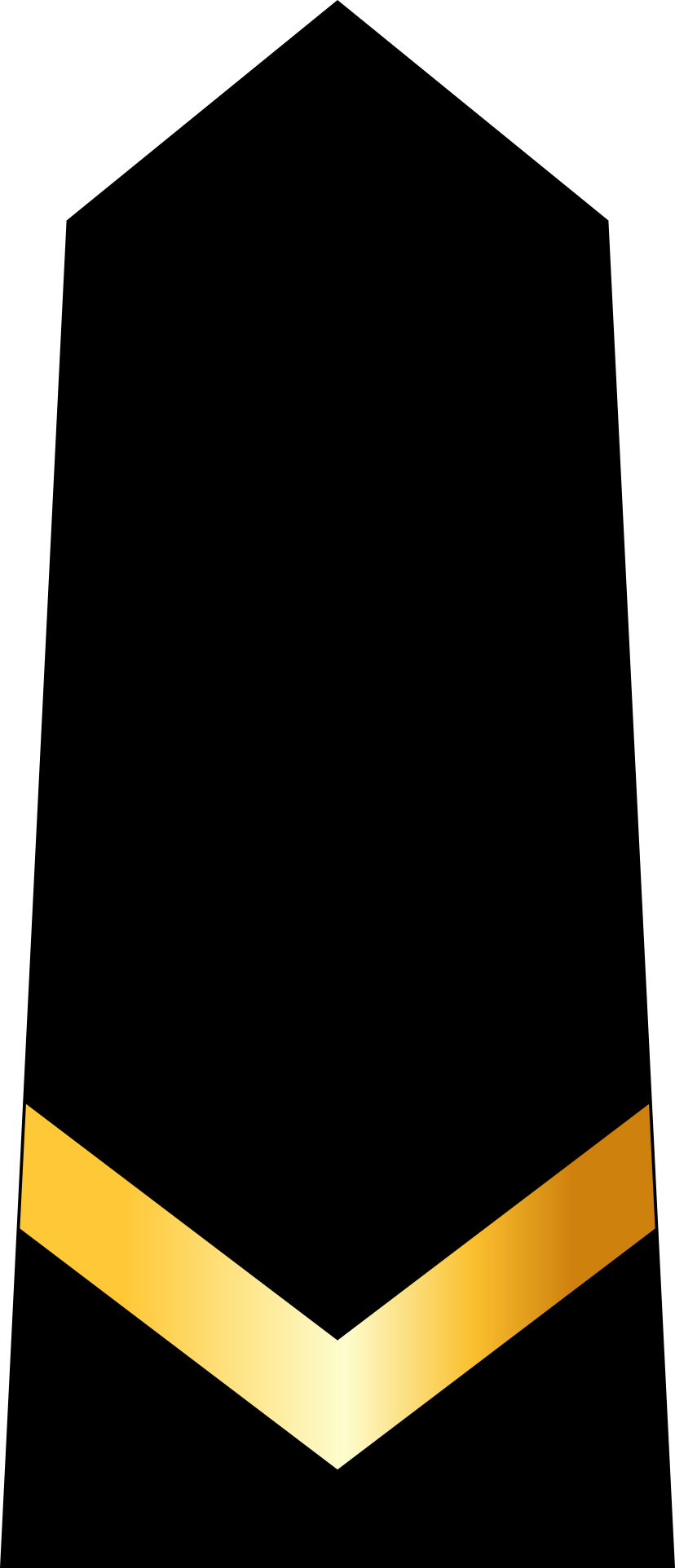
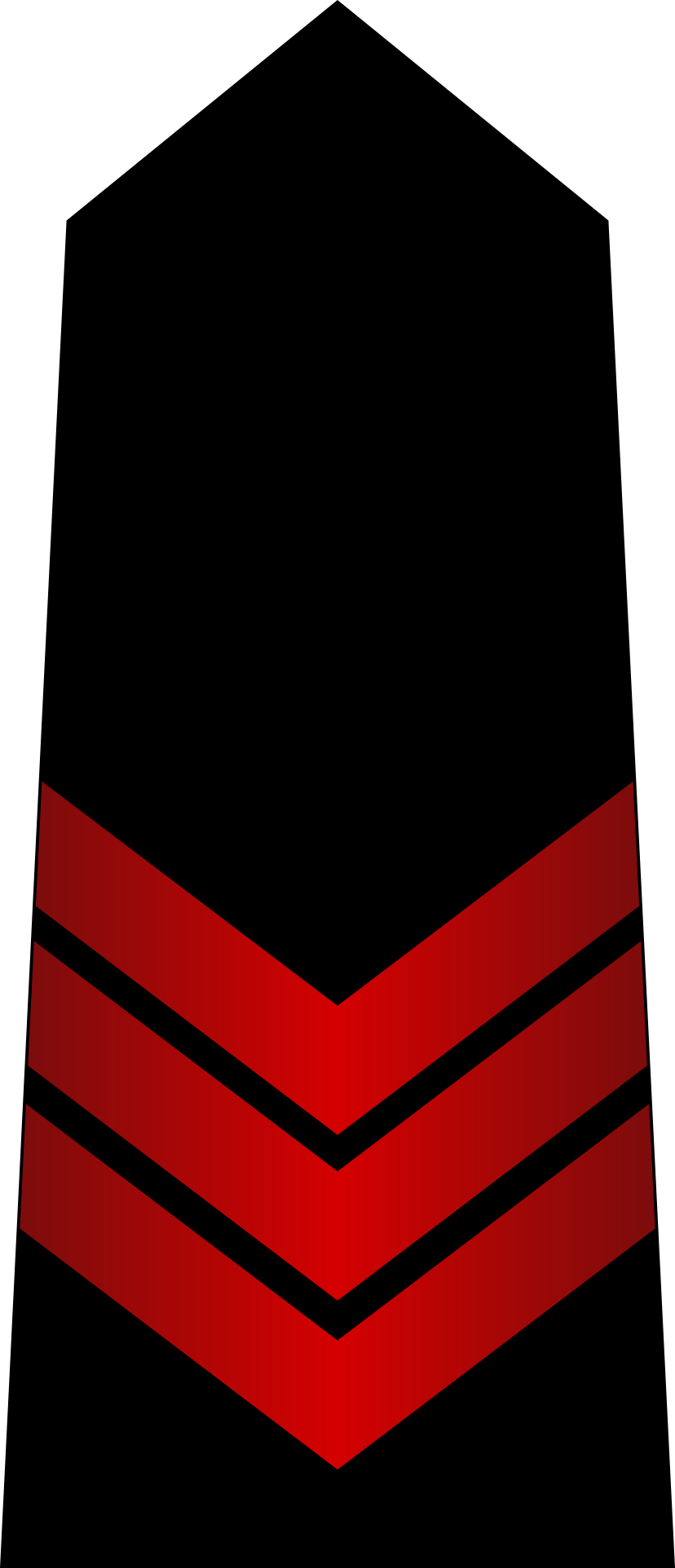
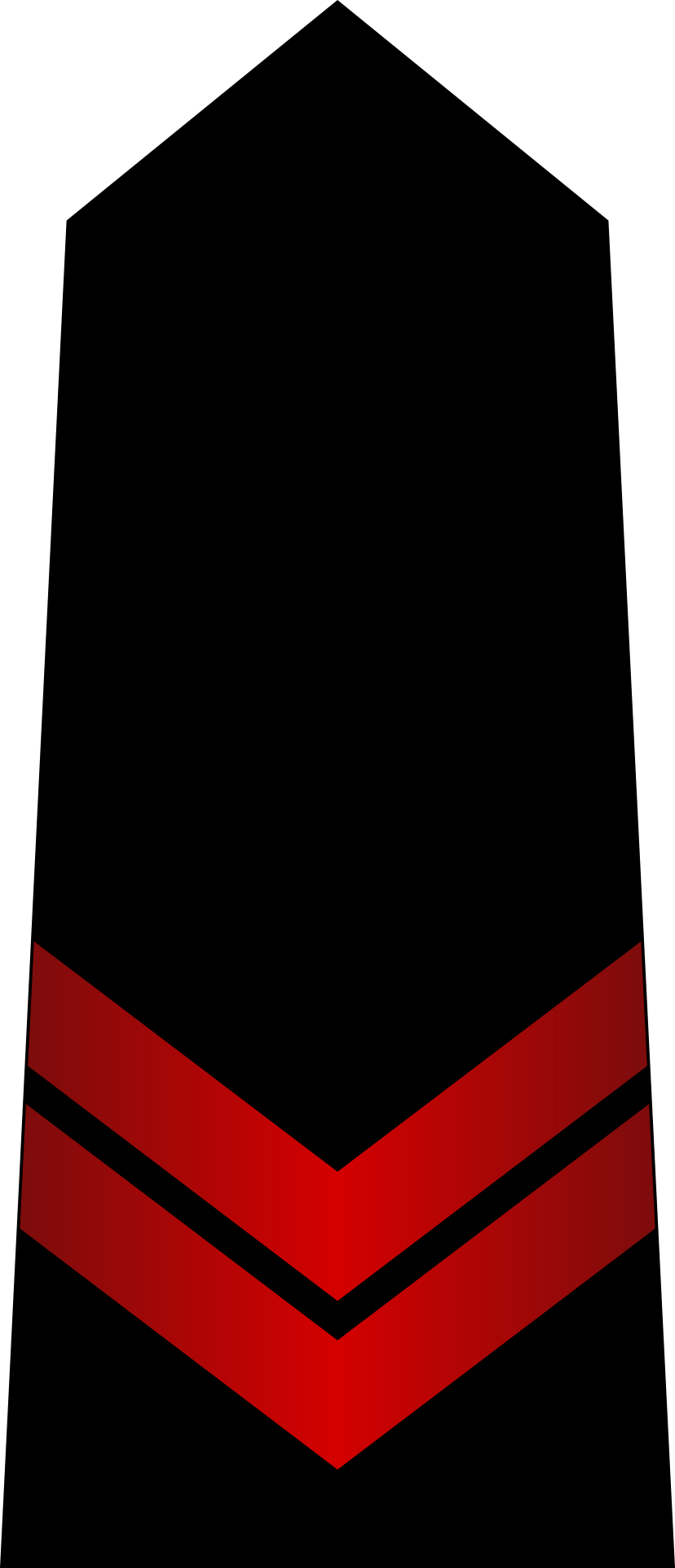
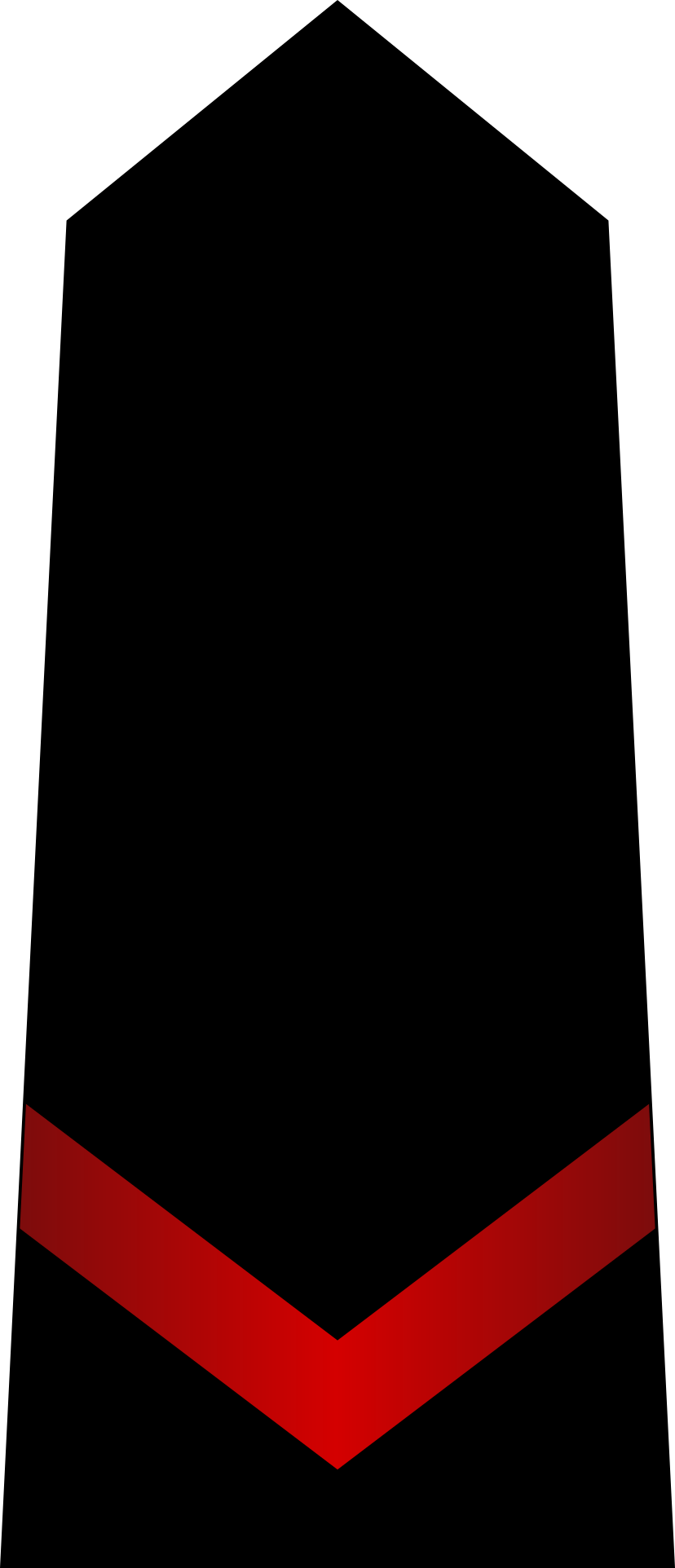
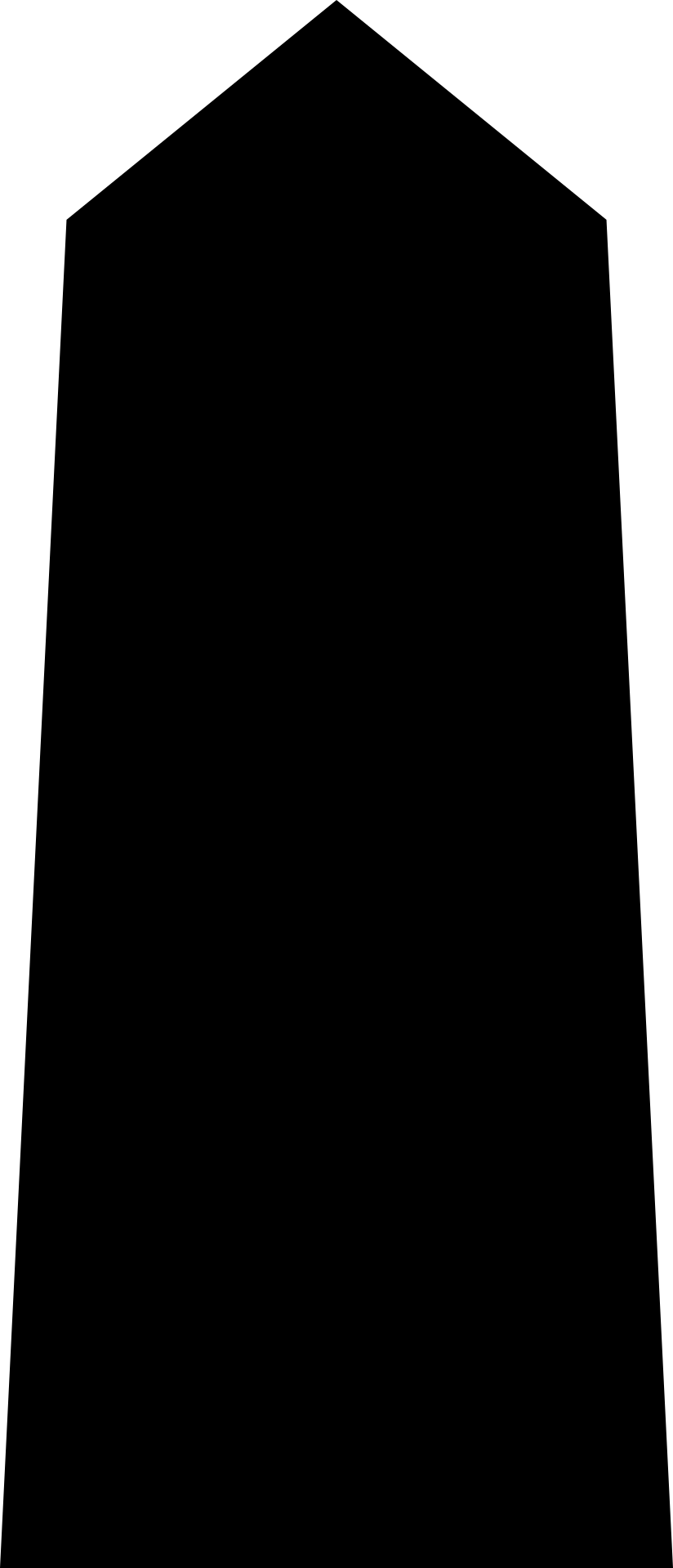
Rank group	Senior NCOs							Junior NCOs		Enlisted
Algerian Land Forces											No insignia
Algerian Land Forces	مساعد أول; Mosa'id awwal			مساعد; Mosa'id		رقيب أول; Raqib awwal	رقيب; Raqib	عريف أول; Earif 'awal	عريف; Earif		جندي; Jundiun
Algerian Land Forces	Adjudant-chef			Adjudant		Sergent-chef	Sergent	Caporal-chef	Caporal		Djoundi
Royal Bahraini Army											No insignia
Royal Bahraini Army					رقیب أول; Raqib 'awal		رقیب; Raqib	عريف; Earif		جندي أول; Jundiun awwal	جندي; Jundiun
Comorian Army
Comorian Army	Adjudant-chef			Adjudant		Sergent-chef	Sergent	Caporal-chef	Caporal	Soldat de 1^{ère} classe	Soldat
Chadian Ground Forces											No insignia
Chadian Ground Forces					Sergent major	Sergent-chef	Sergent		Caporal	Soldat première	Soldat
Djiboutian Army
Djiboutian Army	Adjudant-chef			Adjudant		Sergent-chef	Sergent	Caporal-chef	Caporal	Soldat première	Soldat
Egyptian Army
Egyptian Army	مساعد أول; Mosa'id awwal			مساعد; Mosa'id	رقيب أول; Raqib awwal	رقيب; Raqib		عريف 'arif		جندي; Jundi
Iraqi Ground Forces
Iraqi Ground Forces					رقيب أول; Raqib 'awal	رقیب; Raqib		عريف; Earif		جندي أول; Jundiun awwal	جندي; Jundiun
Royal Jordanian Army											No insignia
Royal Jordanian Army	وكيل أول; Wakil 'awal			وكيل; Wakil	رقيب أول; Raqib 'awal	رقیب; Raqib		عريف; Earif		جندي أول; Jundiun awwal	جندي; Jundiun
Rank group	Senior NCOs							Junior NCOs		Enlisted
Kuwait Army											No insignia
Kuwait Army	وكيل أول; Wakil 'awal			وكيل; Wakil	رقيب أول; Raqib 'awal	رقیب; Raqib		عريف; Earif		جندي أول; Jundiun awwal	جندي; Jundiun
Lebanese Ground Forces											No insignia
Lebanese Ground Forces	مؤهل أول; Muahal 'awal	مؤهل; Muahal	معاون أوّل; Maawan 'awal	معاون; Maawan		رقيب أوّل; Raqib awwl	رقيب; Raqīb	عريف أول; Earif 'awal	عريف; Earif	جندي أول; Jundiun 'awal	جندي; Jundiun
Libyan Ground Forces											No insignia
Libyan Ground Forces				Master Sergeant		Staff Sergeant	Sergeant	Corporal		Private 1st Class	Private
Malian Army
Malian Army	Major		Adjudant-chef	Adjudant		Sergent-chef	Sergent	Caporal-chef	Caporal	Soldat de première classe	Soldat
Mauritanian National Army
Mauritanian National Army	مساعد أول; Mosa'id awwal			مساعد; Mosa'id		رقيب أول; Raqib awwal	رقيب; Raqib		عريف 'arif		جندي; Jundiun
Royal Moroccan Army
Royal Moroccan Army	Adjudant-chef			Adjudant	Sergent-major	Sergent-chef	Sergent	Caporal-chef	Caporal	Soldat de première classe	Soldat de deuxième classe
Royal Army of Oman										No insignia
Royal Army of Oman	وکیل کتیبة; Wakil katiba			وکیل; Wakil	رقیب اول; Raqib 'awal	رقیب; Raqib		عریف; Earif	نائب عریف; Nayib earif	جندي; Jundiun
Palestinian National Security Forces
Palestinian National Security Forces	مساعد أول; Musaeid 'awal			مساعد; Musaeid	رقيب أول; Raqib 'awal	رقيب; Raqib		عريف; Earif		جندي; Jundiun
Qatari Emiri Land Force										No insignia
Qatari Emiri Land Force	وكيل اول; Wakil awwal			وكيل ثاني; Wakil thani	رقيب; Raqib	نائب; Nayib		عريف; Earif	وكيل عريف; Wakil earif	جندي; Jundi
Rank group	Senior NCOs							Junior NCOs		Enlisted
Saudi Arabian Army											No insignia
Saudi Arabian Army	رئيس رقباء; Rayiys ruqaba'			رقيب أول; Raqib 'awal	رقيب; Raqib	وكيل رقيب; Wakil raqib		عريف; Earif		جندي أول; Jundiun awwal	جندي; Jundiun
Somali National Army										No insignia
Somali National Army	Musharax sarkaal		Sadex xarígle	Laba xarígle	Xarígle	Sadex alífle		Laba alífle	Alífle	Dable
Somaliland National Army
Somaliland National Army	Chief warrant officer Musharax sarkaal		Warrant officer class 1 Sadex xarígle	Warrant officer class 2 Laba xarígle	Warrant officer class 3 Xarígle	Sergeant; Sadex alífle		Corporal; Laba alífle	Lance corporal Alífle	Private (or equivalent); Dable
Sudanese Army										No insignia
Sudanese Army				مساعد; Mosa'id	رقيب أول; Raqib awwal	رقيب; Raqib		عريف 'arif	وكيل عريف; Wakil 'arif	جندي; Jundiun
Syrian Army											No insignia
Syrian Army	مساعد أول; Musaeid 'awal		مساعد ثاني; Musaeid thani	مساعد; Musaeid	رقيب أول; Raqib 'awal	رقيب ثاني; Raqib thani	رقيب; Raqib	عريف; Earif		جندي أول; Jundiun 'awal	جندي; Jundiun
Tunisian Army
Tunisian Army	وكيل أعلى; Wakil 'aelaa		وكيل أول; Wakil 'awal	وكيل; Wakil		عريف أول; Earif 'awal	عريف; Earif	رقيب أول; Raqib 'awal	رقيب; Raqib	جندي أول; Jundiun awwal	جندي متطوع; Jundiun
Tunisian Army	Major		Adjudant-chef	Adjudant		Sergent-chef	Sergent	Caporal-chef	Caporal	Soldat de 1^{re} classe	Soldat
United Arab Emirates Army											No insignia
United Arab Emirates Army				مساعد أول; Musa'id 'awal	مساعد; Musa'id		رقیب; Raqib	عريف; Earif		جندي أول; Jundi awwal	جندي; Jundi
Yemeni Land Forces
Yemeni Land Forces	مساعد أول; Musaeid 'awal		مساعد ثان; Musaeid than	مساعد; Musaeid	رقيب أول; Raqib 'awal	رقيب; Raqib		عريف; Earif		جندي; Jundiun
Rank group	Senior NCOs							Junior NCOs		Enlisted
