= Abd al-Basir =

ʻAbd al-Baṣīr (ALA-LC romanization of Arabic: عبد البصير) is a male Arabic given name. It is built from the Arabic words ʻabd and al-Baṣīr, one of the names of God in the Qur'an, which give rise to the Muslim theophoric names. It means "servant of the All-seeing".

It may refer to:

- Abdul Basir Salangi, Governor of Parwan Province, Afghanistan
- Abdul Basir (torture victim) (died 2009), Afghan man who died in custody
- Abdul Baser Wasiqi (born 1975), Afghan athlete
