= Ahmadullah =

Ahmadullah or Ahmad Ulla is both a given name and a surname. Notable people with the name include:

- Ahmadullah Shah (1787–1858), Indian freedom fighter
- Ahmadullah Affandi (1922–2013), Indian scout
- Ahmadullah Alizai (born 1972), Afghan politician
- Shaykh Ahmadullah bin Delwar Hossain (born 1981), Bangladeshi Islamic scholar
- Ahmad Ullah Maizbhandari (1826–1906), Bengali Sufi saint
- Ahmadullah Muttaqi (fl. 2021), Afghan Taliban politician
- Ahmadullah Wasiq (fl. 2020), Afghan politician
- Hafez Ahmadullah (1941–2025), Bangladeshi Islamic scholar
- Qari Ahmadullah (born 1975), Afghan militant

== See also ==
- Ahmad (name)
- Ullah
- Muhammadullah, a related name
