= Abd al-Mun'im =

ʻAbd al-Munʻim (ALA-LC romanization of Arabic: عبد المنعم) is a masculine given theophoric Arabic name that means "servant of the Most Benefactor or Granter (God)". It is also used as a surname. The name is also rendered as Abdulmon'em, Abdulmonim, Abdulmunim, Abd al-Monem, Abdul Monem and others. Notable people with the name include:

== People ==
=== Given name ===
- Abdul Monem (entrepreneur) (1937–2020), Bangladeshi industrialist
- Abdel Moneim Aboul Fotouh (born 1951), Egyptian physician, former student activist and politician
- Abdel Moneim al-Houni, Libyan military officer, diplomat, and politician
- Abdel Moneim Amin (1912–1996), Egyptian military figure and politician
- Abd-al Mun'em Mustafa Halima Abu Basir, Syrian Islamist living in London
- Abdel-Moniem El-Ganayni (born 1960), Egyptian-American nuclear physicist
- Abdul Monem Khan (1899–1971), governor of East Pakistan
- Abdel Moneim Madbouly (1921–2006), Egyptian actor, comedian and playwright
- Abdul Muneem Patel (born 1989), British alleged terrorist
- Abdul Munim, Pakistani politician
- Abdul Munim Qaysuni (1916–1987), Egyptian economist
- Abdelmunim al-Rifai (1917–1985), Lebanese-Jordanian diplomat and politician
- Abdul Munim Riad (1919–1969), Egyptian general
- Abdel Moneim Wahby (1911–1988), Egyptian basketball player
- Abdul Munim Wassel (died 2002), Egyptian soldier

=== Family name and surname ===
- Mohamed Abdel Moneim Al-Fayed, full name of Mohamed Al-Fayed (born 1933), Egyptian businessman
- Qais Bin Abdul Munaim Al Zawawi (1935–1995), Omani politician
- Abdel Moneim El-Guindi (born 1936), Egyptian boxer
- Baker Abdel Munem (born 1942), Palestinian diplomat
- Alaa El-Din Abdul Moneim (born 1951), Egyptian politician
- Hossam Abdelmoneim (born 1975), Egyptian footballer
- Ahmed Adel Abd El-Moneam (born 1987), Egyptian footballer
- Adnan Abd al-Munim al-Janabi, known as Adnan al-Janabi, Iraqi politician
- Prince Muhammad Abdel Moneim (1899–1979), Egyptian prince
