= Batin (surname) =

Batin (Russian: Батин) is a Russian masculine surname; its feminine counterpart is Batina. Notable people with the name include:

- Mikhail Batin (born 1972), Russian businessman and politician
- Paul Batin (born 1987), Romanian football player
