= Abd al-Rabb =

ʻAbd al-Rabb (ALA-LC romanization of Arabic: عبد الرب) is a male Muslim given name, and in modern usage, surname. It is built from the Arabic words ʻabd and al-Rabb. The name means "servant of the Lord", a Muslim theophoric name.

Because the letter r is a sun letter, the letter l of the al- is assimilated to it. Thus although the name is written in Arabic with letters corresponding to Abd al-Rab, the usual pronunciation corresponds to Abd ar-Rab. Alternative transliterations include ‘Abd ar-Rabb, Abdul Rab, and others, all subject to variable spacing and hyphenation.

It may refer to:

== People with the given name ==
- Abdur Rab Nishtar (1899–1958), Pakistani politician
- Abdurabb Al Yazeedi (born 1988), Qatari footballer
- Abdur Rab Jaunpuri (1875–1935), Indian Muslim scholar
- Abdulrab Rasul Sayyaf, Afghan politician and former Mujahideen commander.
- Abdur Rabb (politician), Pakistani politician
- Abdur Rab (academic), Bangladeshi academic and vice-chancellor
- Md. Abdur Rob, Bangladeshi politician
- Habib Abdulrab Sarori (born 1956), Yemeni computer scientist and writer
- Abdulrab Rasul Sayyaf (born 1946) Afghan Mujahideen leader.

== People with the surname ==
- A. S. M. Abdur Rab (born 1945), Bangladeshi politician
- P. K. Abdu Rabb (born 1948), Kerala politician
- Muamer Abdulrab (1982–2021), Qatari footballer
