= Muhammadullah =

Muhammadullah or Mohammadullah is a Muslim masculine given name of Arabic origin. Notable bearers of the name include:

- Muhammadullah Hafezzi (1895–1987), Bangladeshi Islamic scholar, author and politician
- Muhammadullah Khalili Qasmi (born 1979), Indian Islamic scholar and author
- Mohammad Mohammadullah (1921–1999), 3rd President of Bangladesh
- Mohammadullah Hamkar (born 2001), Afghan cricketer
- Mohammadullah Hawladar (1950–2023), Bangladeshi politician and Mayor of Lakshmipur
- Mohammad Ullah (born 1970), Bangladeshi High Court judge

== See also ==
- Muhammad (name)
- Ullah
- Mahmudullah, a related name
