= Abd al-Ghafur =

ʻAbd al-Ghafūr (ALA-LC romanization of Arabic: عبد الغفور) is a male Muslim given name, and, in modern usage, surname, built from the Arabic words ʻabd and al-Ghafūr, one of the names of God in the Qur'an, which give rise to the Muslim theophoric names.

It may refer to:

== People ==
=== Artists ===
- Reham Abdel Ghafour (born 1978), Egyptian actress
- Sarmad Abdul Ghafoor (born 1975), Pakistani guitarist

=== Politicians ===
- Abdul Ghafoor Khan Durrani (1910–2000), Pakistani politician
- Abdul Ghafoor (politician, born 1918) (1918–2004), chief minister of Bihar, India
- Abdul Ghafoor (Saharsa politician) (1959–2020), legislator in Bihar India
- Nawabzada Abdul Ghafoor Khan Hoti (1923–1998), Pakistani politician
- Abdul Ghafoor Ravan Farhadi, or Ravan A. G. Farhâdi (born 1929), Afghan diplomat
- Abdul Ghafor Zori (born 1950), Afghan politician
- Barzan Abd Al-Ghafur Sulayman Majid Al-Tikrit (born 1960), Iraqi politician
- Abdul Ghafoor Khan Mayo (born 1976), Pakistani politician

=== Sportsmen ===
- Abdul Ghafoor (footballer) (1941–2012), Pakistani footballer
- Abdul Ghafoor Yusufzai, Afghan footballer representing the Kingdom of Afghanistan in the 1948 Summer Olympics
- Ahmad Abdulghafoor (born 1987), Kuwaiti footballer
- Abdul Ghafoor Murad (born 1989), Qatari footballer

=== Writers ===
- Abdul Gafur (language activist) (1929–2024), Bangladeshi language activist
- Saleemah Abdul-Ghafur (born 1971), American writer
- Abdul Ghafur Nassakh (1834–1889), Bengali writer

== Other ==
- Abdul Ghafour (died 2007), Afghan, Taliban commander
- Sabi Jahn Abdul Ghafour (1969–2004), Afghan, Taliban commander and former Guantanamo detainee (ISN 363)
- Abdul Ghafour, Afghan, former Guantanamo detainee (ISN 954)
- Abdul Ghafaar, Afghan, former Guantanamo detainee (ISN 1032)
