= Abd al-Sabur =

ʻAbd al-Ṣabūr (ALA-LC romanization of Arabic: عبد الصبور) is a male Muslim given name, built on the Arabic words ʻabd and al-Ṣabūr, one of the names of God in the Qur'an, which give rise to the Muslim theophoric names. It means "servant of the Patient One".

Because the Arabic letter corresponding to s is a sun letter, the letter l of the al- is assimilated to it. Thus although the name is written with letters corresponding to Abd al-Sabur, the usual pronunciation corresponds to Abd as-Sabur. Alternative transliterations include Abdul Saboor and others, all subject to variant spacing and hyphenation.

It may refer to

- Salah Abdel Sabour (1931–1981), Egyptian poet.
- Abdul Sabur Farid Kohistani (1952–2007), Prime Minister of Afghanistan
- Abd'al Sabur, alias of Wadih el-Hage (born 1960), Lebanese imprisoned in the US for terrorist offences.
- Abdul Saboor Qani
- Abdus Sabur (politician), Bangladeshi politician.
