= Daifallah =

Daifallah (Arabic: ضيف الله) is a male Arabic given name meaning guest of God. It is also used as a surname. Notable people with the name include:

== Given name ==
- Daifallah Bouramiya (born 1957), Kuwaiti politician
- Daifallah Masadeh (1938–2015), Jordanian lawyer and politician
- Ibrahim Daif Allah Neman Al Sehli (born 1965), Saudi held in Guantanamo

== Surname ==
- Abdul Latif Dayfallah (1930–2019), Yemeni politician
- Noureddine Daifallah (born 1960), Moroccan calligrapher
