= Zabihallah =

Muslim name list

Zabihallah also spelled Zabihullah, Zabihollah or Dhabihallah Arabic: ذبيح الله is a Muslim name occurring for the most part throughout the Persian influenced Islamic world, translating to "Sacrificer of God."

== Given Names ==
- Zabihollah Safa (born 1911), Iranian Scholar
- Zabihollah Rezaee (born 1954), Iranian Accountant
- Zabihallah Azami Sardoui, Iranian Politician
- Dhabihu'llah Mahrami, Iranian Baha'i Prisoner
- Zabihullah Mujahid (born 1978), Afghan Taliban Spokesman
- Zabihollah Poursheib (born 1988), Iranian Athlete

== See also ==
- List of Arabic theophoric names
