= Ullah =

Islamic name

Ullah is an Islamic name, which means "of Allah" or "of The God".

Ullah is the form assumed by "Allah" when in a genitive construction. For instance, in classical Arabic when case ending vowels were still pronounced, "servant of God" would be "`abdu -llāhi", where the initial "a" of "Allah" is dropped, thus producing the modern word "Abdullah". Other examples include Hizbullah (party of God), Irfanullah (knowledge of God), Jundullah (army of God), Mohibullah (friend of God), Nasrallah (victory of God), Asadullah (Lion of God).

The name Ullah may also refer to:

== People ==
- Ahsan Ullah (born 1992), Pakistani football player
- A. K. M. Alim Ullah (born 1955), Bangladeshi politician
- Atiq Ullah (born 1983), Pakistani football player
- Fareed Ullah (born 2001), Pakistani footballer
- Hamid Ullah Afsar (1895–1974), Indian writer
- Hifazat Ullah Khan (born 1952), Pakistani general
- Ibad Ullah (born 1974), Pakistani politician
- Imran Ullah Khan (born 1932), Pakistani general
- Israr Ullah Zehri (born 1965), Pakistani politician
- Kamran Ullah (born 1983), Dutch journalist
- Khalil Ullah Khan (1934–2014), Bangladeshi actor
- M. M. Rahmat Ullah (born 1940), Bangladeshi politician
- Mushahid Ullah Khan (born 1952), Pakistani politician
- Qudrat Ullah Shahab (1917–1987), Pakistani writer
- Rahim Ullah (died 1861), Bengali rebel
- Sajjad Ullah Baqi (born 1979), Pakistani politician
- Shahkur Ullah Durrani (1928–2009), Pakistani businessman
- S.M. Ullah, Bangladeshi scientist
- Zaka Ullah Bhangoo (1948–2007), Pakistani general
- Dr Zaker Ullah, Bangla TV Presenter
- Zameer Ullah Khan (born 1966), Indian politician

== See also ==
- List of Arabic theophoric names
