= Karamatallah =

Karamatallah (Arabic: کرامت الله), meaning Generosity of God, is a masculine Muslim name of Arabic origin as well as Persian hybridization & distribution, most commonly occurring in Islamic Iranic communities. Variant transliterations are Karamatullah, Karamatollah, Karamatullo.

== Given name ==
- Karamatollah Malek-Hosseini (1924–2012), Iranian Shia Cleric & Politician
- Kiramat Ullah Khan (born 1953), Pakistani Politician
- Karomatullo Qurbonov (1961–1992), Tajik Singer
- Karomatullo Saidov (born 1999), Tajik Football Player

== Surname ==
- Noziya Karomatullo (born 1988), Tajik Singer

== See also ==
- List of Arabic theophoric names
