= Jundallah =

Jundallah (Arabic: جندالله, meaning Soldiers of God) may refer to:

- Army of angels in Islamic tradition
- Jundallah (Iran), a militant organization based in Balochistan, claiming to fight for the rights of Sunni Muslims in Iran.
- Jundallah (Pakistan), a banned Islamist group in Pakistan, closely tied to Al Qaeda and the Taliban
- Jundallah (Syria), a dismantled Salafi jihadist group in Syria
