= Alaa El-Din Abdul Moneim =

Alaa El-Din Abdul Moneim علاء الدين عبد المنعم
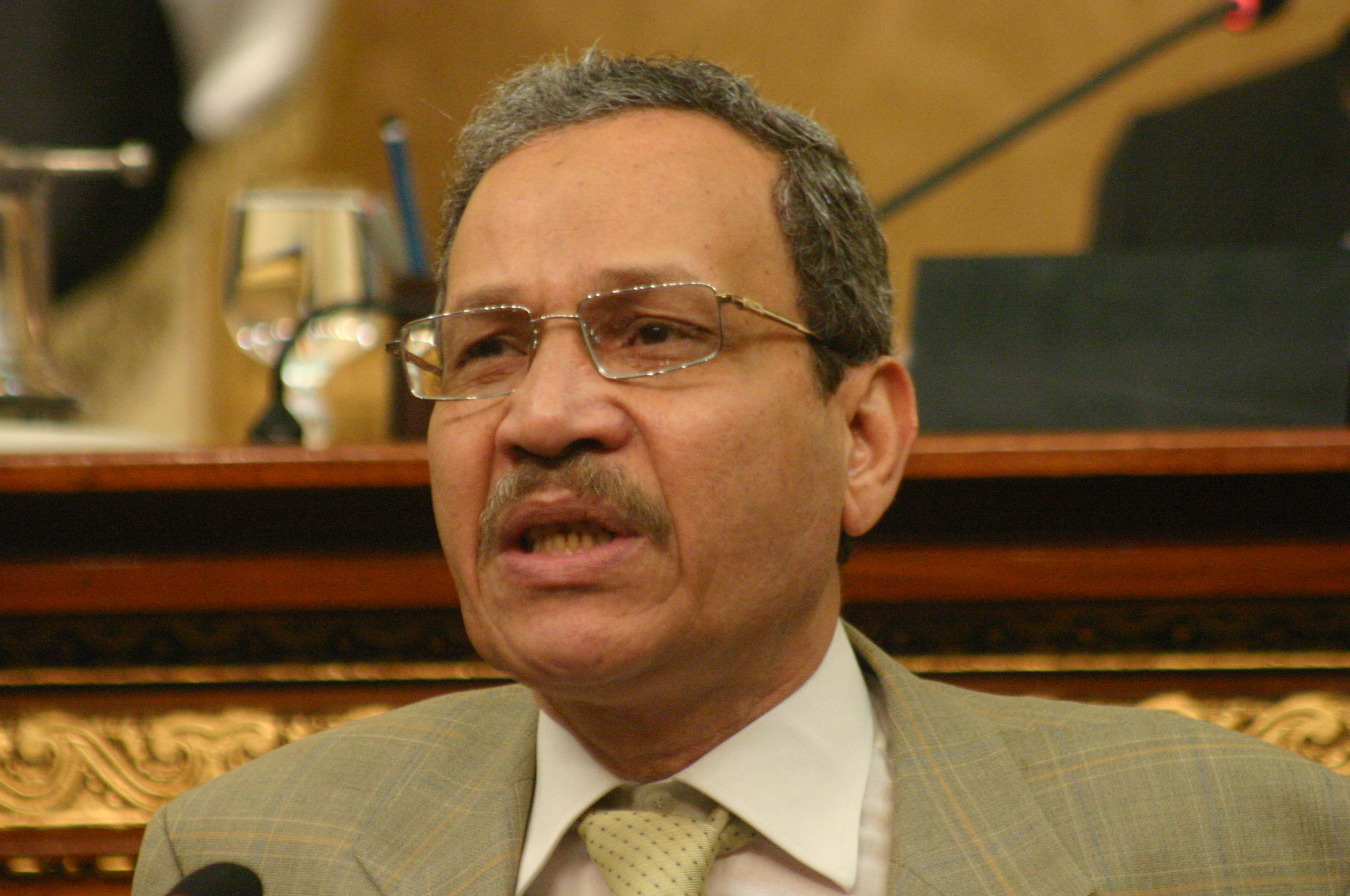
- Alaa El-Din giving a speech inside the parliament
- Born: January 3, 1951 (age 74); New Helmia, Cairo, Egypt
- Occupation(s): Lawyer, Member of the Parliament of Egypt
- Website: www.alaaeldin.com

Alaa El-Din Abdul Moneim (Arabic: علاء الدين عبد المنعم; born January 3, 1951, in New Helmia, Al-Darb Al Ahmar, Cairo, Egypt) is an independent member of the Egyptian Parliament and a lawyer. Alaa El-Din is known for his active role exposing corruption in Egypt, primarily during the Mubarak era.

== Early life ==
Alaa graduated from the Police Academy and served in the Police Department in Egypt for two years before retiring and engaging a position in a law firm in Kuwait. After seven years in Kuwait, Alaa returned to Egypt and started his own law firm.

== Parliament membership ==
In 2005, Alaa decided to run for a seat in the Parliament of Egypt with the aim of bringing corruption issues to public attention. After five years of preparation, Alaa won his seat after re-election against a National Democratic Party nominee.

Alaa brought to public attention a number of controversial corruption cases which he had supported with credible evidence.

== See also ==
- Parliament of Egypt
- National Democratic Party (Egypt)
