= Noureddine Daifallah =

Moroccan calligrapher

- Born: 1960 (age 65–66)
- Citizenship: Moroccan
- Occupation: Calligrapher

Noureddine Daifallah (born 1960 in Marrakesh) is a Moroccan calligrapher. He is a teacher of fine arts in Marrakech whose work has been exhibited in Morocco, France, Italy and Portugal. With his innovations, he adds new touch to the traditional Arabic calligraphy. He won the Biennale de Turquie (International Commission for the Preservation of Cultural Heritage), Istanbul 1991, and the Zémé Rencontre de la jeune Peinture Marocaine, Espace Wafa Bank, Casablanca 1991. The Guggenheim Museum in New York acquired two of his paintings in 2002. a new exhibition of his will open shortly in London.
