= Abdul Jalal =

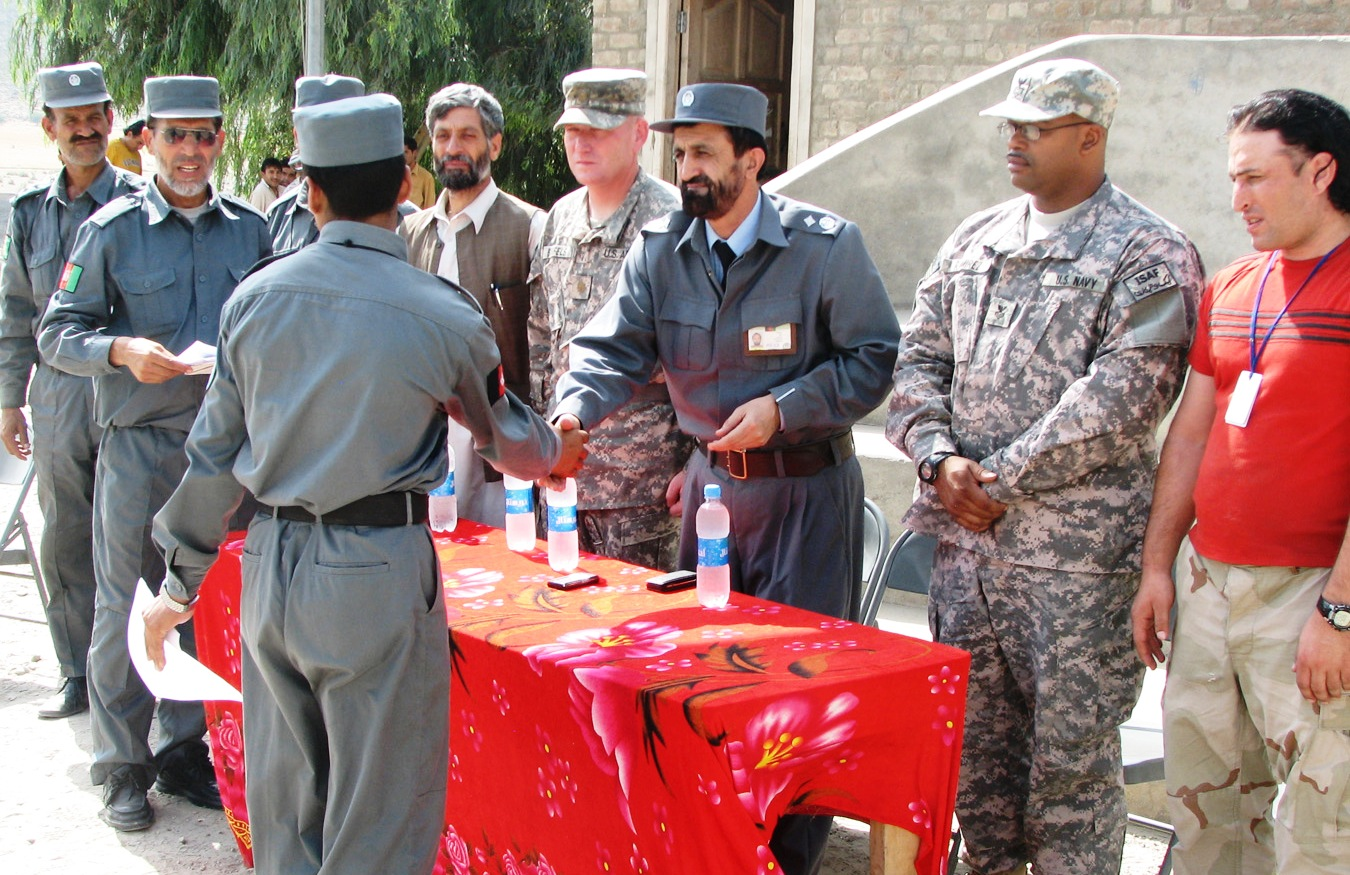
Abdul Jalal gives a new Police Academy graduate his diploma.

Abdul Jalal Jalal is the Chief of Police of Kunar Province, Afghanistan. Jalal was described as a reformer in The Enduring Ledger, the publication of the Public Affairs department of the Combined Security Transition Command.
