= Abdul Basir (torture victim) =

- Abdul Basir's alleged torture scars.
- Born: Afghanistan
- Arrested: 28 October 2009; NDS
- Died: 7 December 2009
- Charge: no charge
- Status: died in custody, authorities claim his death was a suicide

Abdul Basir was a citizen of Afghanistan who died while in the custody of the National Directorate of Security (NDS), then the country's intelligence service.

Basir and three other family members were apprehended on 28 October, on suspicion that they were associated with the bombing of a Kabul guesthouse which housed foreigners. He died on 7 December. Government officials claimed he had committed suicide by jumping out a window; human rights workers asserted that when his body was returned to his family, it bore scars which are more consistent with torture. His family claimed that his brothers and father, who were still in custody, would face retaliation if Basir's family arranged for an autopsy.

== See also ==
- Dilawar
- Gul Rahman
- Bagram torture and prisoner abuse
