= Abdul Hafeez (chemist) =

Pakistani scientist

- Born: 1882; Aligarh, Aligarh district, tate of Uttar Pradesh, British India.
- Died: 1964 (aged 81–82); Lahore, Pakistan
- Citizenship: Pakistan
- Education: Aligarh Muslim University (AMU); University of Marburg (UM)
- Known for: Founder of Pakistan Ordnance Factories (POF) and his work in Explosives engineering
- Scientific career
- Fields: Radiochemistry
- Workplaces: Pakistan Ordnance Factories (POF); Pakistan Army Chemical Laboratories (PACL); Punjab University (PU); Mechanical and Chemical Industry Corporation (MACIC); Steyr Mannlicher (Austria); Steyr-Daimler-Puch (Austria)

Abdul Hafeez was a Pakistani weapons scientist and radiochemist. Hafeez was one of the early pioneer of Pakistan Ordnance Factories at Wah Cantt who made an extraordinary efforts to build and develop medium and high-tech weapons for Pakistan Armed Forces. Hafeez was also a Pan-Islamist and political analyst who had long criticised British imperialism and influence in Muslim world.

== Education and life ==
Abdul Hafeez received his intermediate education from Aligarh, British India, attending Aligarh Muslim University where he studied double majors, receiving BSc with honours in Chemistry and Mathematics from there. He later completed his MSc in Theoretical Chemistry from there. In 1905, he went to Great Britain on a University Scholarship and attended University of Birmingham. While at University of Birmingham, he studied and research in the field of Explosive materials and Radiochemisrty.

Birmingham University officials refused to give him a Doctoral Degree, so Hafeez left Great Britain and moved to Germany where he, then, attended University of Marburg where he was awarded his PhD in Radiochemistry and Explosive Chemistry in 1908. He also specialised in weapon technology and explosive materials from there.

== Death ==
In 1960, Hafeez moved to Austria where he re-joined Steyr Mannlicher. During the time, his Austrian–Pakistani wife was suffering from acute myeloid leukaemia. His wife, Aynmar Rishta Mehrun Nisa, died in 1964. The same year, he suffered a cardial arrest and was immediately taken to hospital where it was announced that he had died. Hafeez and his wife's bodies were taken to Pakistan where they were buried in a Karachi cemetery.
