= Mikhail Batin =

Russian businessman and politician

Mikhail Batin (Михаил Александрович Батин) (born July 3, 1972) is a Russian businessman and politician. He is Chairman of the Board of the NGO "Science For Life-Extension".

Mikhail Batin, a follower of the Russian cosmism ideas, is actively supporting research projects to study the mechanisms of aging and longevity. He endorses cryonics.

== Biography ==
Batin graduated from Kostroma State University. In 1995, he organized a consulting company United Consultants FDP. In 2004, he was elected deputy of the Kostroma Oblast Duma. In 2005, he was elected Chairman of Federation of Trade Unions of the Kostroma region.

== Current activity ==
Mikhail Batin and his foundation are amongst the organisers of the 2nd International Conference «Genetics of Aging and Longevity» in Moscow and amongst the founders of the world's first Longevity political party which started in Moscow in July 2012 and triggered the process of the formation of similar parties throughout the world.

According to the biographical note on the "Futurology" book and multiple interviews, Mikhail Batin is the Director of the Regenerative Medicine Laboratory at the Moscow Institute of Physics and Technology.

=== Posts ===
- Director General of JSC «United Consultants FDP (1995-2002)
- Chairman of the Board of Directors of the group of companies (2002-2004)
- Chairman of the Commission on Social Policy of Kostroma Region (2004 -)
- Chairman of Federation of Trade Unions of the Kostroma region (2005-2008)

=== Awards ===
- Diploma of Governor of Kostroma region for work on additional education students
- Diploma of the Ministry of Education of Russia for the Best Educational Camp
- Jubilee Medal of the Federation of Independent Trade Unions of Russia

He is considered to be the advocate of Russia's transhumanist movement and the follower of Russian cosmists.

As co-chairman President of Science for Life Extension Foundation, he organized the Third International Conference on Genetics of Aging and Longevity in Sochi, Russia.

== Bibliography ==
=== Books ===
- M. Batin "Cures for aging". 2007

=== Publications ===
- Science closes on aging secrets
- The mission of the Russian people. What is it?
- The medicine of old age will be found
- The agenda
