= Abd al-Raqib =

ʻAbdur al-Raqīb (ALA-LC romanization of Arabic: عبد الرقيب) is a male Muslim given name. It is built from the Arabic words ʻabd and al-Raqīb, one of the Names of God in the Qur'an, which give rise to the Muslim theophoric names. The name means "servant of the observer".

Because the letter r is a sun letter, the letter l of the al- is assimilated to it. Thus although the name is written in Arabic with letters corresponding to Abd al-Raqib, the usual pronunciation corresponds to Abd ar-Raqib. Alternative transliterations include Abdu raqeeb, Abdul Raqeeb and others, all subject to variable spacing and hyphenation.

It may refer to:

- Abdur Raqib (cricketer) (born 1947), Pakistani cricketer
- H Abdul Raqeeb, Indian businessman
- Hanif Abdurraqib, American poet, essayist, and cultural critic
- Abdur Raquib Nadwi Islamic scholar, Lecturer of Hadith and Islamic studies born in 1990 At village Bhulki, Uttar Dinajpur district from West Bengal India. He completed master's degree in Modern Arabic language and literature from University of Madras Chennai Tamil Nadu India and also completed master's degree in Islamic theology from Aliah University Kolkata, the capital of West Bengal, India

He wrote Some books for examples: 1- Women in Islam in Urdu language 2- تقوية الحديث الضعيف في ضوء منهج النقاد من المحدثين

3- প্রচলিত শির্ক ও ভূল প্রথা 4- The Value of Pen in Urdu language 5- Prophet's Wives and Orientalists 6- رؤیت ہلال اور اختلاف مطالع 7- لڑکیاں باعث رحمت یا زحمت؟ 8- مؤمنون کی مائیں 9- تعليم اللغة العربية للاطفال 10- الفقه الميسر باللغة البنغالية 11- ছোটদের বক্তব্য 12- সন্ত্রাসের বিরুদ্ধে আহলে হাদীস আলেমদের ফতোয়া ( বাংলা অনুবাদ)
