= Abdul Batin =

ʻAbd al-Batin is a Bengali masculine given name. It is built from the Arabic words ʻabd and al-Batin, one of the names of God in the Qur'an, which give rise to the Muslim theophoric names. Notable people with this name include:

- Abdul Batin Jaunpuri (1900–1973), Indo-Bangladeshi Islamic scholar
- Khandaker Abdul Baten (1946–2019), Bangladeshi politician from Tangail
- Abdul Baten Mojumdar Komol (born 1987), retired Bangladeshi footballer
- Abdul Baten Patuakhali, Bangladeshi parliamentarian
- Abdul Batin Khandakar, Bengali politician from Assam

== See also ==
- Abdul Awwal
