= Abdul Matin (general) =

Major General of the Bangladesh Army

- আবদুল মতিন
- Military career
- Allegiance: Bangladesh
- Branch: Bangladesh Army
- Service years: 1978–2014
- Rank: Major General

Abdul Matin is a retired major general and engineer of the Bangladesh Army. He was the master general of ordinance and principal staff officer of the Bangladesh Army.

Matin was the second-in-command of the Bangladesh Army Court of Inquiry into the 2009 Bangladesh Rifles revolt. He that the incident was an operation involving India and the Awami League. Speaking at a press conference on September 5, 2024, he described the mutiny as a long-term plan to weaken Bangladesh and turn it into a dependent state, orchestrated by internal traitors and external forces. He linked the massacre to other national issues such as corruption, voter-less elections, and human rights violations, emphasizing the need for proper investigation and justice to prevent further destabilization. Matin called the mutiny one of the darkest massacres in history.
