= Abdul Muneem Patel =

Abdul Muneem Patel (born 17 April 1989) is one of the suspects arrested in the UK in connection to the 2006 transatlantic aircraft terrorist plot in the United Kingdom, and one of the nineteen whose accounts were frozen by the Bank of England. He was the youngest of the arrested suspects, being only 17 years old at the time.

== Convicted and charges ==
On 10 August he was arrested by British authorities. He was jailed for six months at the Old Bailey in October 2007 after a jury found him guilty of having a terrorism-related explosives manual. The judge said Patel was guilty of possessing the document - but was not a "radicalised or politicised Islamist".

== Background ==
Abdul Muneem Patel grew up in east London as the son of Muslim parents from Gujarat, India.
