= Jarallah =

Jarallah also sometimes spelled Jaralla is a common Arabic given name and surname. Notable people with the given name and surname include:

== Given name ==
- Mohamed Shaif Jaralla, [1946-2007] Yemeni diplomat, politician and former Army and Airforce S. Commander
- Jarallah Alaluwayt, Saudi major general with Royal Saudi Armed Forces: the Royal Saudi Strategic Missile Force
- Jaralla al-Marri, Qatari citizen, former detainee at the United States Guantanamo Bay detention camp
- Jaralla al-Marri (footballer), Qatari football player
- Jarallah Omar (1942–2002), Yemeni politician, intellectual and guerrilla fighter

== Surname ==
- Ahmed Al-Jarallah (born 1942), Kuwaiti journalist, author
- Hussam ad-Din Jarallah (1884–1954), Sunni Muslim leader of the Palestinian people during the British Mandate of Palestine and the Grand Mufti of Jerusalem from 1948 to 1954
