= Raqīb =

Arabic word

Raqīb (Arabic: رقيب, also transliterated Raqeeb) is an Arabic word meaning overseer, also sometimes translated by words such as watcher, controller, supervisor or observer.

The word has two major uses in the Quran. As a religious term, it is one of the Islamic names of God, and as a result features in the Muslim names such as Abdur Raqib, meaning "servant/ slave of the Watcher/ Overseer/ Ever-Watchful/ Observer".

In Urdu language, the word Raqeeb is also used for a person who is your Rival in Love. Who loves the same person you do or your Lover loves him. It is widely used in Urdu prose and poetry.

In Kurdish, it means "hunter" although in Arabic it has an opposite meaning

In Arab armies, raqīb overseer ranks are superior to the rank of arīf (عريف), which means "expert" and is equivalent to corporal in many other countries. Raqīb ranks are immediately below the ranks of "assistant" (مساعد) and "first assistant", which are equivalent to Commonwealth ranks of warrant officer.

== Current use ==
The rank of Raqīb is usually equivalent to the Anglophone ranks of sergeant, petty officer second class and staff sergeant, depending on the service branch.

| Insignia | Army | Navy | Air Force |
|---|---|---|---|
| Algerian People's National Armed Forces | | | |
| French | Sergent | | |
| Bahrain Defence Force | | | |
| Egyptian Armed Forces | | | |
| Iraqi Armed Forces | | | |
| Jordanian Armed Forces | | | |
| Kuwait Armed Forces | | | |
| Lebanese Armed Forces | | | |
| Armed Forces of Mauritania | | | |
| Sultan of Oman's Armed Forces | | | |
| Armed Forces of Saudi Arabia | | | |
| Sudanese Armed Forces | | | |
| Syrian Armed Forces | | | |
| Tunisian Armed Forces | | | |
| French | Caporal | | |
| United Arab Emirates Armed Forces | | | |
