= Abdul Matin (poet) =

- Occupations: Tahsildar and 'Kamdar'
- Known for: scholar and administrator

Abdul Matin was Tahsildar and ‘Kamdar’ in the Bhopal state. He is a poet and author.

== Biography ==
Abdul Matin was a poet and author as well as an able administrator. He gained mastery in many languages including Arabic, Persian, English and Turkish. ’

Abdul Matin 'Matin' was first appointed as Tahsildar and then promoted for the post of 'Kamdar' in the State of Bhopal. While, he was Tahsildar at Kalya Khera, Bhopal in 1908, he had literary correspondence with Alan Brooke, 1st Viscount Alanbrooke of Brookeborough (1883–1963). His letters to Brooke on training manoeuvres, Indian Staff College entrance examinations, racing and hunting expeditions are preserved in the Liddell Hart Centre for Military Archives (King's College London Archives relating to South Asia)

Abdul Matin 'Matin' died on 20 April 1938 /18 Muharram 1357 AH at Bhopal.

== Literary activities and journalism ==
Abdul Matin 'Matin' wrote poems on science, philosophy, religion and ethics. Most of his poetries and articles were published in 'Paisa Akhbar' (founded by Maulana Mahboob Alam). His editorial articles and poems are also published in 'Akhbar Shaula' (edited by Hafiz Ahmad Ali Khan 'Shauq').

Along with Yusuf Qaiser, Abdul Matin 'Matin' started a fortnightly Urdu newspaper by the name of 'Malwa Review'.

=== Poems ===
His translated poems are Motiyun ki Ladi (from Arabic book Sullamul Adab), Tarjuma Tarikh Yemen (From Turkish book), Majtanak Falsafa (From Turkish book).

=== Books ===
He wrote stories for children such as Saleem Bano, Josh Numa, Humayun Khatoon, Be Ma'n ki Bachhi, Tahira ki Gudiya, Shaista Dulhan, Aulad ki Mohabbat, etc. Some of his poetry based books are:

1. Science wa Falsafa
2. Falsafa wa Akhlaq
3. Raaze Konen yani Sahifa-e Sultani
4. Qeemti Zewar
5. Taleemul Islam
6. Duniya wa Uqba
