= Abdul Matin (Taliban leader) =

Taliban leader (1960 – 2008)

- Born: 1960
- Died: 18 February 2008 (aged 47–48); Gereshk
- Occupation: Taliban leader

Mullah Abdul Matin (c. 1960 – 18 February 2008) was a Taliban leader in Afghanistan who was killed in combat in the Gereshk region of Helmand Province.

In 2007, Mullah Matin became the governor of Musa Qala District, which had come under Taliban control, following the breakdown of a truce between the insurgents and the coalition. From there he launched ambushes and suicide attacks against coalition and Afghan government targets in Northern Helmand. In December 2007, he narrowly avoided capture during Operation Mar Kardad, the offensive undertaken by coalition and Afghan forces to recapture Musa Qala.

On 18 February 2008, Mullah Matin and one of his sub-commanders, Mullah Karim Agha, were travelling through the desert on motorbikes when they were ambushed and killed by British Special Boat Service commandos inserted by helicopter. Abdul Matin had been accused by the coalition to have been responsible for the deaths of two British soldiers and of dozens of Afghan civilians.
