= Abd al-Jamil =

ʻAbd al-Jamīl (ALA-LC romanization of Arabic: عبد الجميل) is a Muslim given name of Arabic origin, made from the elements ʻabd and al-Jamīl, meaning servant of the beautiful one.

It may refer to:

- Abdul Jamil Shah I of Pahang (died 1512), Sultan of Pahang
- Tun Abdul Jamil (died 1688), Malay warrior of the Johor Sultanate
- Abdul Jamil Abdul Rais (1912–1994), Malaysian civil servant
- Abdul Jamil Khan (born 1930), Pakistani medical doctor
- Abdul Jamil Tajik, Pakistani American researcher
- Mustafa Abdülcemil Dzhemilev (born 1943), Chairman of the Mejlis of the Crimean Tatar People

== See also ==
- Cemil
- Jamil
