= Abdul Matin (actor) =

Nepalese actor

Abdul Matin (born 15 February 1980), better known as Martin Khan, is a Nepalese actor and costume designer from Kisangunj, Bihar, India. As an actor, he has started from the music video called Mero Saath sing by hit singer Nabin K Bhattrai in 2001. As a Costume Designer he started from Nepali Movie called Mero euta Sathi Chha in 2009. His debut movie was Facebook in the year of 2011 Directed by Suraj Subba “Nalbo”. His most successful movie was Kohinoor which is All-time blockbuster at Nepali Film Industry History. He has an executive chairman of Factory Outlet Pvt.Ltd (Pocket) and also Managing Director of New OOPSS Pink Girly Traders.

Music Video

Year	Video
2001	Mero Saath (Nabin K Bhattrai)
2001	Ek Nazar here unlai (Haris Mathema)
2001	Eklai Muskauna Deu (1974 AD)
2002	Ekpalta Musuka (Bishwo Bandu Ghimire)
2003	Mitho Mitho Samjhana (Rajkumar Joshi)

Filmography

Year	Movie	Position
2009	Mero Euta Sathi Chha	Costume Designer
2010	I am Sorry	Costume Designer
2010	Batch No.16	Costume Designer
2011	Mero Love Story	Costume Designer
2011	Facebook	Actor/Costume Designer
2011	3 Lovers	Costume Designer
2012	Sorry La	Actor/Costume Designer
2012	My Promise	Actor/Costume Designer
2014	Stupid Maan	Actor/Costume Designer
2013	Mero Valentine	Costume Designer
2014	Kohinoor	Actor
2014	Shree 5 Ambare	Actor
