= Hamid =

- Pronunciation: Arabic: [ħaˈmiːd] Persian: [haˈmiːd, hæˈmiːd] Urdu: [ɦɛˈmiːd̪]
- Gender: Male

Origin
- Origin: Arabic
- Meaning: Praiseworthy

Other names
- Variant forms: Hamed, Hameed
- Related names: Hamad, Hamit

Hamid, Hamed, or Hameed is a masculine given name and surname of Arabic origin. Notable people with the name include:

== Given name ==
=== Hamed ===
- Hamed Abdel-Samad (born 1972), German-Egyptian author
- Hamed Afagh (born 1983), Iranian basketball player
- Hamed Aghaei (born 1997), Iranian footballer
- Hamed Ahangi (born 1979), Iranian comedian, host, actor, and director
- Hamed Abderrahaman Ahmad (born 1974), Spanish terrorist
- Hamed Ameli (born 1977), Iranian politician
- Hamed Amiri (born 1982), Iranian Paralympic athlete
- Hamed Bahiraei (born 1995), Iranian footballer
- Hamed Bakayoko (1965–2021), Ivorian politician
- Hamed Al-Balushi (born 1980), Omani footballer
- Hamed al-Bariqi, Saudi surgeon
- Hamed Behdad (born 1973), Iranian actor and singer
- Hamed Belem (born 1999), Burkinabé footballer
- Hamed Al-Bishi (born 1982), Saudi track and field athlete
- Hamed Coulibaly (born 1996), Ivorian footballer
- Hamed Abu Daabas (born 1961), Arab-Israeli politician
- Hamed Modibo Diallo (born 1976), Ivorian footballer
- Hamed Hervé Diomandé (born 1988), Ivorian footballer
- Hamed Al-Doseri (born 1989), Bahraini footballer
- Hamed Dramé (born 2001), French footballer
- Hamed Esmaeilion (born 1977), Iranian-Canadian social activist and author
- Hamed Fallahzadeh (born 1986), Iranian footballer
- Hamed Fallatah (born 1992), Saudi footballer
- Hamed Al-Ghamdi (born 1999), Saudi footballer
- Hamed Gohar (1907–1992), Egyptian oceanographer
- Hamed Habibi (born 1978), Iranian poet and writer
- Hamed Haddadi (born 1985), Iranian basketball player
- Hamed Haddadi (computer scientist) (born 1981), British-Iranian computer scientist
- Hamed Haghshenas (born 1994), Iranian para taekwondo practitioner
- Hamed Hajimehdi (born 1988), Iranian footballer and futsal player
- Hamed Hamdan (born 2000), Palestinian footballer
- Hamed Heidari (born 1991), Iranian-Azerbaijani Paralympian athlete
- Hamed Hosseinalizadeh (born 1998), Iranian footballer
- Hamed Hosseinzadeh (born 1987), Iranian basketball player
- Hamed Al-Jazaf (born 1969), Bahraini footballer
- Hamed al-Jubouri (1932–2017), Iraqi politician and diplomat
- Hamed Karoui (1927–2020), Tunisian politician
- Hamed Kavianpour (born 1978), Iranian footballer
- Hamed Khan (born 1998), Hong Kong cricketer
- Hamed Al-Khatri (born 1985), Omani sport shooter
- Hamed Khosravi (born 1992), Iranian footballer
- Hamed Komaily (born 1982), Iranian actor
- Hamed Koné (born 1987), Ivorian footballer
- Hamed Lak (born 1990), Iranian footballer
- Hamed Mahmoudi (born 1987), Iranian footballer
- Hamed Malekmohammadi (born 1983), Iranian judoka
- Hamed Al-Maqati (born 1993), Saudi footballer
- Hamed Momeni (born 1985), Iranian football administrator
- Hamed Nada (1920–1990), Egyptian artist
- Hamed bin Zayed Al Nahyan (born 1971), Emirati businessman
- Hamed Namouchi (born 1984), Tunisian footballer
- Hamed Nasrabadian (born 1973), Iranian academic, theatre director, and stage actor
- Hamed al-Nazir (born 1975), Sudanese journalist and novelist
- Hamed Noormohammadi (born 1986), Iranian footballer
- Hamed Pakdel (born 1991), Iranian footballer
- Hamed Rasouli (born 1985), Iranian footballer
- Hamed Rezaei (born 1983), Iranian volleyball player
- Hamed Rezakhani (born 1979), Iranian swimmer
- Hamed Sadeq (born 1971), Kuwaiti sprinter
- Hamed Sarlak (born 1989), Iranian footballer
- Hamed Diane Séméga (born 1962), Malian politician and businessman
- Hamed Shakernejad (born 1983), Iranian qari
- Hamed Shami (born 1984), Qatari footballer
- Hamed Al-Shanqiti (born 2005), Saudi footballer
- Hamed Shiri (born 1986), Iranian footballer
- Hamed Shirkanlou, Iranian footballer
- Hamed Sinno (born 1988), Lebanese-American musician and writer
- Hamed Snousi (born 1989), Libyan footballer
- Hamed Sohrabnejad (born 1983), Iranian basketball player
- Hamed Solhipour (born 1989), Iranian Paralympic powerlifter
- Hamed Soltani, Iranian producer, television presenter, and director
- Hamed Talebi (born 1991), Iranian freestyle wrestler
- Hamed Traorè (born 2000), Ivorian footballer
- Hamed Al-Wahaibi (born 1968), Omani rally driver
- Hamed Zamani (born 1989), Iranian footballer
- Hamed Zolfaghari, Iranian documentary filmmaker and producer

=== Hameed ===
- Hameed Adewale, Nigerian politician
- Hameed Ullah Jan Afridi, Pakistani politician
- Hameed Akhtar (1923–2011), Pakistani newspaper columnist, writer, and journalist
- Hameed Mohammed Yahya Aklan (born 1969), Yemeni radiologist
- Hameed Ali (born 1955), Nigerian Army officer
- Hameed Ali (basketball) (born 1993), American basketball player
- Hameed Baloch (died 1981), Pakistani revolutionary
- Hameed Mytheen Kunju Basheer (born 1973), Malaysian politician and teacher
- Hameed Chennamangaloor (born 1948), Indian social critic
- Hameed Al-Gheilani (born 1984), Omani footballer
- Hameed Haroon, Pakistani economist
- Hameed Hussain, Pakistani politician
- Hameed Hussain Sheikh Ismail (1901–1974), Sri Lankan lawyer and politician
- Hameed Nizami (1915–1962), Pakistani journalist
- Hameed Adekunle Makama Oyelude (born 1964), Nigerian royal
- Hameed Al-Qallaf (born 1987), Kuwaiti footballer
- Hameed Al-Qushaibi (1956–2014), Yemeni Army officer
- Hameedur Rahman (born 1956), Pakistani jurist
- Hameed Rashid (born 1963), Iraqi footballer
- Hameed Sheikh (born 1969), Pakistani actor, director, and producer
- Hameed Wain (1930–1997), Pakistani actor

=== Hamid ===
- Hamid ibn al-Abbas (837–??), Abbasid vizier
- Hamid Barole Abdu (born 1953), Eritrean writer
- Hamid Abdulla (born 2001), Swedish-Iraqi footballer
- Hamid Aboutalebi (born 1957), Iranian diplomat
- Hamid Reza Abrarinia (born 1978), Iranian futsal coach and player
- Hamid Khozouie Abyane (born 1963), Iranian cinematographer
- Hamid Khan Achakzai, Pakistani politician and doctor
- Hamid Ullah Afsar (1895–1974), Indian poet and writer
- Hamid Seyyed Mahdavi Aghdam (born 1952), Iranian politician
- Hamid Ahadad (born 1994), Moroccan footballer
- Hamid Ahmadi (futsal) (born 1988), Iranian futsal player
- Hamid Ahmadi (historian) (born 1945), Iranian historian
- Hamid Ahmadieh (born 1953), Iranian ophthalmologist and medical scientist
- Hamid al-Ahmar (born 1967), Yemeni politician
- Hamid Ahmed, Iraqi basketball player
- Hamid Algabid (born 1941), Nigerien politician
- Hamid Algadri (1912–1998), Indonesian independence fighter
- Hamid Algar (born 1940), British-American Iranologist
- Hamid Alhadad (born 1935), Indonesian diplomat
- Hamid Ali, Maldivian film director, producer, actor, and writer
- Hamid bin Abdallah al-Ali (born 1960), Kuwaiti Islamic scholar
- Hamid Alidoosti (1956–2026), Iranian football coach and player
- Hamid Amini (1980–2026), Iranian-Norwegian engineer
- Hamid Arabnia (born 1958), American computer scientist
- Hamid Arasly (1902–1983), Soviet scientist
- Hamid Reza Ardalan (born 1959), Iranian musician
- Hamid Ashraf (1946–1976), Iranian revolutionary
- Hamid-Reza Assefi (born 1952), Iranian diplomat
- Hamid Awaludin (born 1960), Indonesian diplomat
- Hamid Idris Awate (1910–1962), Eritrean guerrilla commander
- Hamid Aytaç (1891–1982), Turkish Islamic calligrapher
- Hamid Reza Azarang (born 1972), Iranian actor, director, and screenwriter
- Hamid Mohamed Azim (born 1956), Egyptian volleyball player
- Hamid Azizzadeh (born 1981), Iranian footballer
- Hamid-Reza Haji Babaee (born 1959), Iranian politician
- Hamid Reza Babaei (born 1975), Iranian footballer
- Hamid Babazadeh (born 1964), Iranian footballer
- Hamid Sultan bin Abu Backer (born 1955), Malaysian judge, legal academic, and author
- Hamid Baeidinejad (born 1962), Iranian diplomat
- Hamid Baghaei (born 1969), Iranian politician
- Hamid al-Bayati, Iraqi diplomat, academic, and author
- Hamid Beg, Hamidid ruler
- Hamid Behbahani (1941–2024), Iranian academic and politician
- Hamid Ali Bela (1932–2001), Pakistani folk singer and television performer
- Hamid Bénani (born 1940), Moroccan film director, screenwriter, and cinematographer
- Hamid Berguiga (born 1974), Algerian footballer
- Hamid Berhili (born 1964), Moroccan boxer
- Hamid Bernaoui (1937–2020), Algerian footballer
- Hamid Bey, Ottoman politician
- Hamid Ait Bighrade (born 1976), Moroccan boxer
- Hamid Biglari, Iranian-American finance executive and entrepreneur
- Hamid Bouchnak (born 1969), Moroccan raï singer
- Hamid Bovard (born 1964), Iranian politician
- Hamidu Baba Braimah (1953–2009), Ghanaian politician
- Hamid Mahmood Butt, Pakistani ophthalmologist
- Hamid Chabat (born 1953), Moroccan politician
- Hamid Nasir Chattha (born 1944), Pakistani politician
- Hamid Chitchian (born 1957), Iranian politician
- Hamid Reza Chitgar (1949–1987), Iranian politician
- Hamid Choi (born 1949), South Korean translator and academic
- Hamidul Huq Chowdhury (1901–1992), Pakistani-Bangladeshi politician
- Hamid Dabashi (born 1951), Iranian-American academic
- Hamid Dalwai (1932–1977), Indian journalist, social reformer, thinker, activist, author, and writer
- Hamid Dastmalchi, Iranian-American poker player
- Hamid Dawai, Sudanese militant
- Hamid Dehghani (born 1984), Iranian director, playwright, and actor
- Hamid Derakhshan (born 1959), Iranian footballer
- Hamid Dizdar (1907–1967), Bosnian writer and poet
- Hamid Drake (born 1955), American musician
- Hamid Farooq Durrani, Pakistani jurist and lawyer
- Hamid Reza Ebrahimi (born 1976), Iranian footballer
- Hamid Babatunde Eesuola (died 2024), Nigerian politician
- Hamid Ekbia (born 1955), Iranian-American scholar, theorist, and writer
- Hamid Enayat (1932–1982), Iranian political scientist and translator
- Hamid Erfani (born 1988), Iranian footballer
- Hamid Estili (born 1967), Iranian football coach and player
- Hamid Etemad (born 1945), Iranian professor
- Hamid Ezzine (born 1983), Moroccan long-distance runner
- Hamid Farrokhnezhad (born 1969), Iranian actor, writer, and director
- Hamid Reza Fathi (born 1980), Iranian footballer
- Hamid Fawzi (born 1939), Iraqi footballer
- Hamid Fazeli, Iranian Army officer and politician
- Hamid Ferej, Eritrean politician
- Hamid Frangieh (1907–1981), Lebanese politician
- Hamid Gabbay (born 1943), Iranian-American architect
- Hamid Gada (died 2000), Indian militant
- Hamid Garmabi (born 1961), Iranian engineer and politician
- Hamid Gasimbayov (1923–2005), Azerbaijani military officer
- Hamid Ghandehari, Iranian-American chemist
- Hamid Ghassemi-Shall (born 1967), Iranian-Canadian computer technician
- Hamid al-Ansari Ghazi (1909–1992), Indian Islamic scholar, author, and journalist
- Hamid Ghodse (1938–2012), British-Iranian academic
- Hamid Reza Gholipour (born 1988), Iranian wushu athlete
- Hamid Raza Gilani (1936–2004), Pakistani politician and diplomat
- Hamid Golpira (1960–2015), Iranian-American journalist, author, and human rights activist
- Hamid Gul (1936–2015), Pakistani politician
- Hamid Guska (born 1953), Bosnian boxing coach
- Hamid Hajizadeh (1950–1998), Iranian poet
- Hamid Bou Hamdan (born 1989), Iranian footballer
- Hamid al-Tijani Hanoun, Sudanese politician
- Hamid Ul Haq (born 1964), Pakistani politician
- Hamid Ul Haq Haqqani (1968–2025), Pakistani Islamic scholar and politician
- Hamidul Haque (born 1970), Bangladeshi Army officer
- Hamid Hassan (born 1987), Afghan cricketer
- Hamid Hassy (born 1953), Libyan Army officer
- Hamid Hedayati (born 1976), Iranian footballer
- Hamid Himid (born 1955), Eritrean politician
- Hamid Yar Hiraj (born 1973), Pakistani politician
- Hamid Reza Hosseini (born 2000), Afghan futsal player
- Hamid Yusif Hummadi (1935–2022), Iraqi politician
- Hamid Hussain (born 1946), Indian politician
- Hamid al-'Imadi (1692–1758), Syrian mufti
- Hamidul Islam (born 1989), Bangladeshi cricketer
- Hamidul Islam (cricketer, born 1995) (born 1995), Bangladeshi cricketer
- Hamid Ismail (born 1986), Qatari footballer
- Hamid Ismailov (born 1954), Uzbek journalist
- Hamid Jafarkhani (born 1966), Iranian-American electrical engineer and professor
- Hamid Janina (born 1958), Moroccan footballer
- Hamid Jasemian (1936–2021), Iranian footballer
- Hamid Javaid (1947–2019), Pakistan Army general
- Hamid Jebeli (born 1958), Iranian actor, director, and voice actor
- Hamid Jokar (born 1987), Iranian footballer
- Hamid Kahram (1958–2020), Iranian politician and veterinarian
- Hamid Al Kamali (born 1992), Emirati footballer
- Hamid Karzai (born 1957), Afghan politician
- Hamid El Kasri (born 1961), Moroccan Gnawa musician
- Hamid Reza Katouzian (born 1959), Iranian politician and academic
- Hamid Kazemi (born 1988), Iranian footballer
- Hamid Reza Kazemi (born 1992), Iranian footballer
- Hamid Saeed Kazmi (born 1957), Pakistani politician
- Hamid Kerayechian (born 1979), American business executive and entrepreneur
- Hamid Khan (lawyer) (born 1946), Pakistani politician and lawyer
- Hamid Ali Khan (born 1953), Pakistani classical singer
- Hamid Ali Khan of Rampur (1875–1930), Indian Nawab of Rampur
- Hamid Ali Khan (scholar) (1860–1918), Indian Islamic scholar, barrister, and orator
- Hamid Nawaz Khan (died 2014), Pakistan Army general
- Hamid Raza Khan (1875–1943), Indian Islamic scholar
- Hamidul Haque Khandker (born 1955), Bangladeshi politician
- Hamid Lolayi (born 1955), Iranian actor
- Hamid Lotfollahian (born 1973), Iranian politician
- Hamid Lounaouci (1955–2026), Algerian politician
- Hamid Rashid Maʽala (died 2021), Iraqi politician
- Hamid El Mahdaoui (born 1979), Moroccan journalist and activist
- Hamid Mahmoudi (born 1985), Iranian Canadian football player
- Hamid Maleki (born 1996), Iranian footballer
- Hamid Mammadzadeh (1924–2000), Azerbaijani writer and literary critic
- Hamid Manssour (born 1992), Syrian discus thrower
- Hamid Merakchi (1976–2024), Algerian footballer
- Hamid Mido (born 1993), Syrian footballer
- Hamid Mir (born 1966), Pakistani journalist and columnist
- Hamid Mirza (1918–1988), Iranian royal
- Hamid Ali Mirza (1940–2017), Pakistani lawyer
- Hamid Mirzadeh (born 1950), Iranian politician and academic
- Hamid Reza Mobarrez (born 1981), Iranian swimmer
- Hamid Moghadam (born 1956), Iranian-American business executive and philanthropist
- Hamid Mojtahedi (1942–2021), Iranian director and cinematographer
- Hamid Mosadegh (1940–1998), Iranian poet, author, and lawyer
- Hamid Motahari (born 1974), Iranian football coach and player
- Hamid Motebassem (born 1958), Persian musician
- Hamid Majid Mousa (born 1941), Iraqi politician
- Hamid Mowlana (born 1937), Iranian-American author and academic
- Hamid Hussain Musavi (1830–1888), Indian Shia Islamic scholar
- Hamid Reza Naddaf (born 1992), Iranian tennis player
- Hamid Naficy (born 1944), Iranian-American filmmaker, writer, scholar, and educator
- Hamid Nagra (born 1943), Pakistani cricketer
- Hamid M.K. Al-Naimiy (born 1947), Emirati scientist
- Hamid Najah (1949–2024), Moroccan actor, set designer, poet, and artist
- Hamid Nater (born 1980), Moroccan footballer
- Hamid Nawab, American engineer
- Hamid Naweed, Afghan-American writer and art historian
- Hamid Sadighi Neiriz (born 1947), Iranian visual artist
- Hamid Neshatjoo (born 1979), Iranian footballer
- Hamid Nizami (1915–1962), Pakistani journalist and politician
- Hamid Reza Noorbakhsh, Persian classical vocalist and musician
- Hamid Notghi (1920–1999), Iranian poet, writer, author, and university professor
- Hamid Olimjon (1909–1944), Uzbek poet and scholar
- Hamid Oualich (born 1988), French-Moroccan middle-distance runner
- Hamid Oujebbad, Moroccan alpine skier
- Hamid Reza Pahlavi (1932–1992), Iranian royal
- Hamid Parvar (born 1989), Iranian footballer
- Hamid Pourhashemi (born 1990), Iranian cyclist
- Hamid Pourmand (born 1958), Iranian Army officer
- Hamid Afaq Qureshi (born 1945), Indian historian
- Hamid Rahimi (born 1983), Afghan boxer
- Hamidul Rahman (born 1959), Indian politician
- Hamid Ur Rahman, Pakistani politician
- Hamidur Rahman (1953–1971), Bangladeshi Army soldier
- Hamidur Rahman (artist) (1928–1988), Bangladeshi artist and sculptor
- Hamidur Rahman (Bangladeshi politician) (born 1967), Bangladeshi politician
- Hamid Rahmanian (born 1968), Iranian-American artist
- Hamid Rahmouni (born 1967), Algerian footballer
- Hamid Rana (born 1957), Pakistani actor
- Hamid Rashid Randhawa, Pakistan Air Force officer
- Hamid Ali Rao (born 1954), Indian diplomat
- Hamid Rasaee (born 1967), Iranian Shia cleric and politician
- Hamid Reza Rasekh (born 1962), Iranian pharmacologist and toxicologist
- Hamid Rashidi (1961–2020), Iranian lawyer and writer
- Hamid Raza (born 1978), Pakistani politician and religious scholar
- Hamid Razak (born 1985), Singaporean politician, orthopedic surgeon, and academic
- Hamid Ibn Muhammad Ibn Raziq (1783–1874), Omani poet and historian
- Hamid Ur Rehman, Pakistani politician
- Hamidur Rahman Remon (born 1990), Bangladeshi footballer
- Hamid Rhanem (born 1981), French footballer
- Hamid bin Ahmad Al Rifaie (born 1940), Saudi activist
- Hamid al-Saadi (born 1958), Iraqi singer
- Hamid Sadid (born 1989), Afghan mixed martial artist and footballer
- Hamid Sadr (born 1946), Iranian-Austrian author
- Hamid Reza Sadr (1956–2021), Iranian critic, journalist, author, professor, historian, and economist
- Hamid Juma Faris Jouri al-Saeedi, Iraqi terrorist
- Hamid Ekrem Šahinović (died 1936), Bosnian writer and dramatist
- Hamid Said (born 1941), Iraqi poet and writer
- Hamid Sajjadi (born 1969), Iranian politician
- Hamid Samandarian (1931–2012), Iranian director and translator
- Hamid Al Shaeri (born 1961), Egyptian-Libyan singer, songwriter, and musician
- Hamid Shafaat (born 1984), Iranian footballer
- Hamid Shafiei (born 1981), Iranian footballer
- Hamid Shah (born 1992), Danish cricketer
- Hamid Shahriari (born 1963), Iranian Twelver Shia cleric
- Hamid bey Shahtakhtinski (1880–1944), Azerbaijani educator
- Hamid Raja Shalah (born 1950), Iraqi Air Force officer
- Hamid Reza Shekarsari (born 1966), Iranian poet, researcher, author, and literary critic
- Hamid Shirvani (born 1950), Iranian-American architecture academic
- Hamid Shirzadegan (1941–2007), Iranian footballer
- Hamid Slimi, Canadian imam
- Hamid Soltanian-Zadeh (born 1960), Iranian biomedical engineer
- Hamid Sourian (born 1985), Iranian wrestler
- Hamid Sultanov (1889–1938), Soviet politician
- Hamid Supaat (born 1944), Malaysian cyclist
- Hamid Tafazoli (born 1968), Iranian-German literary scholar
- Hamid Tamjidi (born 1956), Iranian writer, film director, and producer
- Hamid Taqavi (1955–2014), Iranian military officer
- Hamid Tavakkol (born 1933), Iranian wrestler
- Hamid Termina (born 1977), Moroccan footballer
- Hamid Majd Teymouri (born 1953), Iranian footballer
- Hamid Tibouchi (born 1951), Algerian painter and poet
- Hamid Tuah (1919–1997), Malaysian peasant leader
- Hamid Vahedi (born 1965), Iranian Army general
- Hamid Vahid-Dastjerdi (born 1959), Iranian philosopher
- Hamid Naderi Yeganeh (born 1990), Iranian mathematical artist
- Hamid Yousefi (born 1992), Iranian film director, screenwriter, researcher, and producer
- Hamid Bey Yusifbeyli (1873–??), Azerbaijani politician, educator, and teacher
- Hamid Zafar, Pakistani politician
- Hamid Zaher (born 1974), Canadian-Afghan writer and activist
- Hamid Zarbaf (born 1990), Dutch footballer
- Hamid Zouba (1935–2022), Algerian football player and manager
- Hamid Reza Zouravand (born 1990), Iranian race walker

== Surname ==
=== Hamed ===
- Alejandro Hamed (1934–2023), Paraguayan diplomat and Arabist
- Amir Hamed (1962–2017), Uruguayan writer and translator
- Amr Hamed (died 1998), Canadian terrorist
- Ezzedin Yacoub Hamed, Egyptian Long Jumper
- Ibrahim Hamed (born 1965), Hamas military commander
- Mohamed Naguib Hamed (born 1962), Egyptian athlete
- Naseem Hamed (born 1974), British boxer
- Nima Arkani-Hamed (born 1972), Iranian-American-Canadian theoretical physicist
- Sanaa Ismail Hamed (born 1984), Egyptian model
- Taha Bidaywi Hamed, Iraqi politician
- Zid Abou Hamed (born 1970), Australian athlete

=== Hameed ===
- Haseeb Hameed (born 1997), English cricketer
- Yasmeen Hameed (born 1952), Pakistani Urdu poet

=== Hamid ===
- Jasmin Hamid (born 1984), Finnish actress
- Mohsin Hamid (born 1971), Pakistani British author
- Rani Hamid (born 1944), Bangladeshi chess player

== See also ==
- Abu Hamid Muhammad Ibn Muhammad Al-Ghazali, Persian theologian, philosopher, and jurist
- Al Hamed, town in Egypt near Rosetta
- Hameed (village) a village in Hazro Tehsil, Punjab, Pakistan
- Abdul Hamid
- Hamid al-Din (disambiguation)
- Hamidids, 14th century Turkic dynasty
- Hamit
- Hamidah (disambiguation)
