= Telok Gong, Port Klang =

Fishing village within Port Klang in Selangor, Malaysia

Telok Gong (Jawi: تلوق ڬوڠ) is a fishing village near Pulau Indah within Port Klang in the state of Selangor, Malaysia.

In the 1960s it was the source of rural agitation by landless peasants led by Hamid Tuah.

Formerly a traditional agricultural locale, Telok Gong is currently surrounded by industrial areas consisting of an unplanned concentration of medium and heavy industries due to its proximity and accessibility to West Port. Large tract of former tapioca, cocoa, coconut and oil-palm plantations are being leveled and replaced by high and wide steel structure go-downs.

Telok Gong is known for its seafood, as there are several Chinese seafood restaurants in this area.
