= Ali Zaidi =

Ali Zaidi may refer to:

- Ali al-Zaidi (born 1985/1986), Iraqi politician and businessperson
- Ali Zaidi (lawyer), American lawyer and policy advisor
- Ali Zaidi (politician), a Pakistani politician
- Ali Jawad Zaidi (1916-2004), an Indian poet, scholar and author
- Ali Mabrouk El Zaidi (born 1978), a Libyan long-distance runner
- Safi Lakhnavi (born Syed Ali Naqi Zaidi) (1862-1950), an Urdu poet

== See also ==
- Zaidi (surname)
