= Ghandehari =

Ghandehari is a surname. Notable people with the surname include:

- Hamid Ghandehari (fl. from 1989), Iranian-American scientist
- Sasan Ghandehari (fl. from 2002), Iranian-born British billionaire
