= Hamid II =

Hamid II may refer to:

- Abdul Hamid II (1842–1918)
- Syarif Hamid II of Pontianak (1913–1978)

== See also ==
- Hamid (name)
