= Hamid Ali Khan (scholar) =

Influential personality of Colonial India

Hamid Ali Khan (14 December 1860 – 12 September 1918) was an Indian Islamic scholar, barrister, and orator from Amroha. He was born in Bareilly to Hakim Muhammad Amjad Ali Khan, a Shia intellectual who served as the deputy collector of Amroha. Khan was known for his contributions to Islamic scholarship and legal practice.

== Early life and education ==
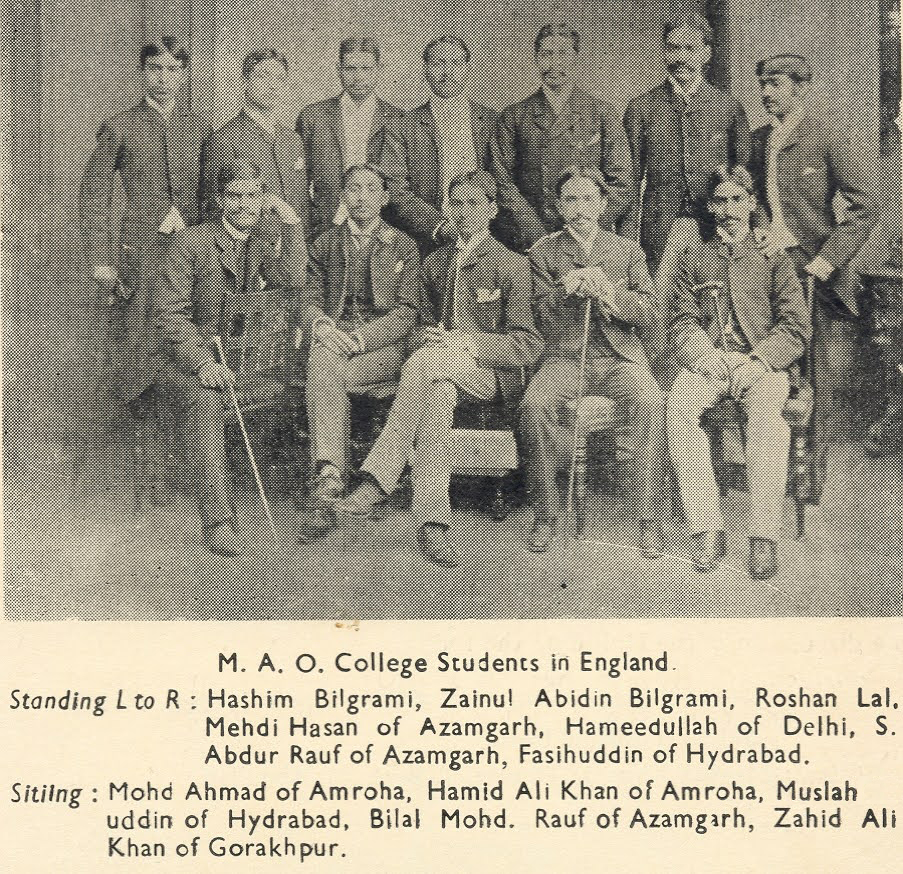
M.A.O. College Aligarh Students in England Circa 1885

In 1880, Hamid Ali Khan obtained a bachelor's degree from Aligarh. He then pursued legal studies in London, enrolling to become a barrister-at-law. During his time in London, he was associated with Nawab Syed Manzoor Ali and Sir Asman Jah. He also met notable figures such as poet Lord Alfred Tennyson, administrator Sir William Muir, and Edward VII, who was then the prince of Wales and later became the emperor of India.

== Literary contributions ==
Hamid Ali Khan began his legal career in Lucknow in 1886 but was also active in literary pursuits. His interest in poetry developed during his school years and deepened during his time in London, where he interacted with literary figures such as Nawab Saiyid Manzoor Ali of Bengal and Sir Asman Jah of Hyderabad. In 1885, he wrote A Farewell to London, an English poem reflecting on his departure from the city in 1885.

Upon returning to India, Hamid participated in musha’irahs (poetry gatherings) and became involved in Urdu poetry. Under the guidance of poets such as Shaikh Ali Khazeen, Ahsan Lakhnawi, and Safi Lakhnawi, he composed works in various forms, including qasida (panegyric), hamd (praise of God), na’at (praise of the Prophet), ruba’i (quatrain), ghazal (lyric poetry), qata (couplet-based poem), and sehra (wedding poem).

On June 13, 1916, poet Dil Shahjahanpuri praised Hamid's work, declaring him worthy of the title "Sadi of Urdu", a comparison to the revered Persian poet. His literary contributions were recognized by figures such as Asar Lakhnawi, Ahsan Mahrehrawi, Bekhud Mohani, Altaf Husain Hali, Shad Azimabadi, and Mujtaba of Amroha.

Hamid Ali Khan's Urdu prose includes a notable full-length biography of Saiyid Karamat Husain of Lucknow, a prominent high court judge and an early advocate for Muslim women's education in North India. Published in 1918, a year after Karamat Husain's death, Hamid Ali Khan's work stands out for its comprehensive approach. Meanwhile, Chaudhary Muhammad Ali Rudaulvi, who also admired Karamat Husain's efforts, released a 41-page memoir the same year. Despite belonging to different qasbahs, both writers shared an appreciation for Karamat Husain's legacy. Muhammad Ali's memoir provides a more personal perspective, recounting his encounters and emphasizing the cordial relationship between Hamid Ali Khan and Karamat Husain.

Hamid Ali Khan summarized it thus:

"Karamat uth gaye Hamid fasana reh gaya baqi,

Hamari aur unki mustaqil sacchi muhabbat ka" (Karamat left, O Hamid! All that remains is but the story Of mine and his resolute, deep afection)

The biographies of Saiyid Karamat Husain by Hamid Ali Khan and Chaudhary Muhammad Ali Rudaulvi complement each other, blending formal analysis with personal reflection. While Hamid Ali Khan’s full-length biography provides a detailed and structured account, Chaudhary Muhammad Ali’s memoir offers a more informal and intimate narrative of Karamat Husain's life and impact.

Hamid Ali Khan's literary contributions extend far beyond biographical works. His portfolio includes Hamare Hum-asr (Our Contemporaries), which profiles notable contemporaries, and critical works like Muqabla Dabir-o-Milton, a comparative analysis of Dabir and John Milton, and Atish, focusing on the Urdu poet Khwaja Haider Ali Aatish (1778–1848). He actively contributed to Urdu periodicals, fostering literary discourse and spotlighting poets such as Asghar of Ghazipur, whose work he featured in the journal May'ar.

Although his English writings are fewer, they are noteworthy. "The Vernacular Controversy" examines the Nagri agitation of 1900, highlighting debates over script reform, while "The Bulwark of India" envisions a harmonious Anglo-Indian relationship. He even ventured into health-related subjects, with works like How to Check Diabetes.

== Family background ==
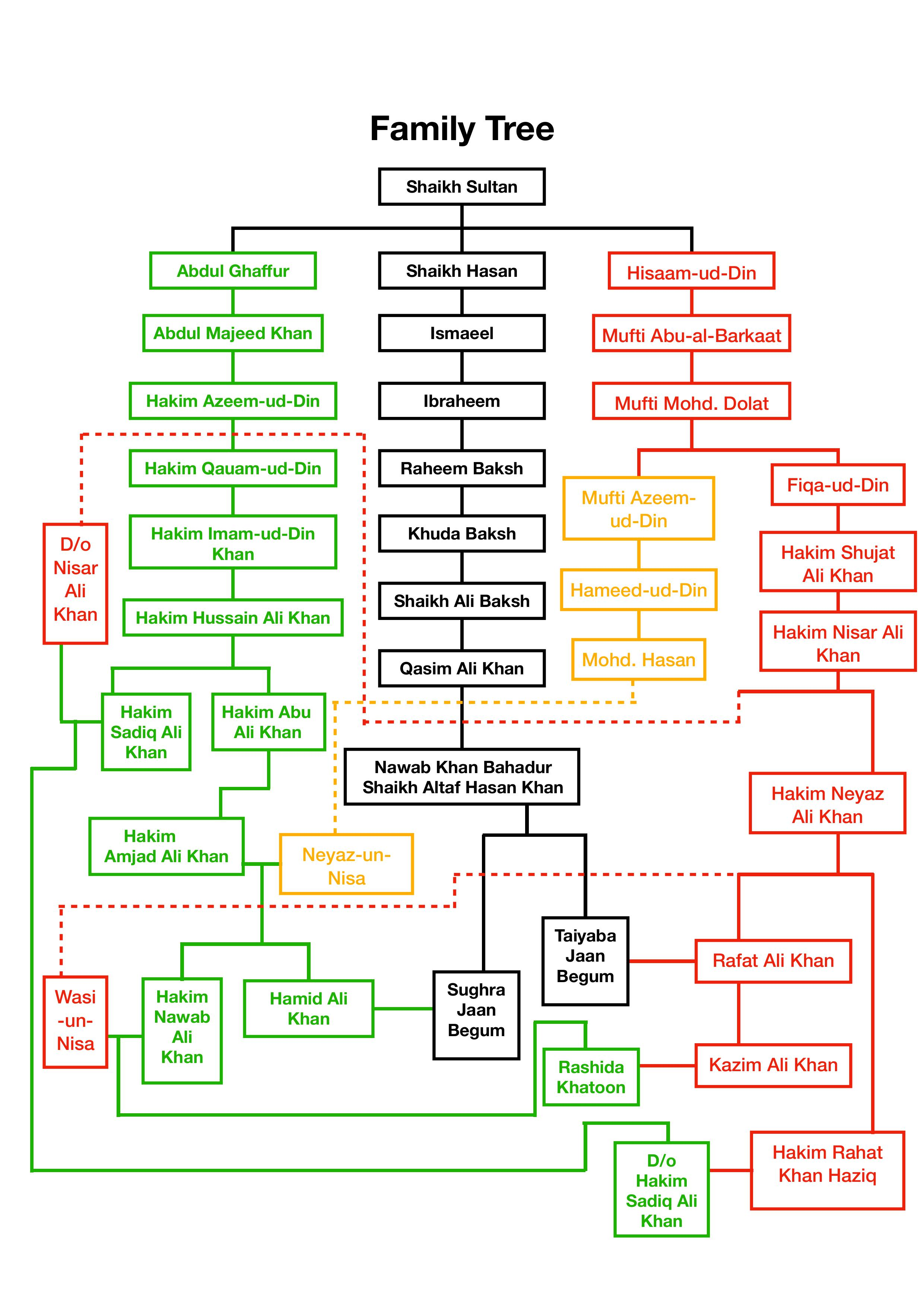
Family Tree of Hamid Ali Khan

Hamid Ali Khan belonged to a prominent family with a background in public service, literature, and traditional medicine. His father, Hakim Amjad Ali Khan (1827–1900), was a physician (hakim), a scholar in multiple disciplines, and served as a deputy collector in Amroha.

His father-in-law, Nawab Khan Bahadur Shaikh Altaf Hasan Khan, was a landowner (rais) of Lucknow, and his ancestral property included Talkatora Karbala. Hamid Ali Khan's uncle, Hakim Neyaz Ali Khan (1832–1911), was also a deputy collector and a landowner.

Kazim Ali Khan (1896–1973), the son of Rafat Ali Khan, was an advocate and special magistrate in Amroha. He was also involved in Urdu literature and poetry, publishing Gul Parey and organizing literary forums featuring poets such as Mus'hafi and Iqbal. Additionally, he led local religious and cultural associations and served as the president of Dargah Najaf-e-Hind, Jogipura.

== Political and Social Influence ==
In addition to his literary contributions, Hamid was also involved in politics. He was elected to a legislative position in 1893 and again in 1895, receiving support from both Hindu and Muslim communities. His political career took place during a period of increasing Hindu revivalism, and he was recognized for his efforts in engaging with diverse communities.

Hamid Ali Khan played an active role in these discussions, leading a committee in Lucknow focused on advocating for the retention of Urdu in education and administration. He addressed these concerns in his article The Vernacular Controversy, in which he examined the implications of the proposed script reforms and argued for the continued use of Urdu.

Hamid Ali Khan's residence served as a venue for political and social discussions. In 1901, Nawab Mushtaq Husain Viqar-ul-Mulk held a meeting at Hamid's house to address concerns related to linguistic and cultural issues. Hamid later participated as a delegate at the 1906 Muslim Educational Conference in Dhaka, an event that contributed to the founding of the All-India Muslim League. His involvement in these initiatives reflected the engagement of the qasbāti (small-town Muslim elite) in broader political movements during the early 20th century.
