= Agordat Operation =

- Part of Eritrean War of Independence
- Agordat Operation (Eritrea)
- Location: 15°33′N 37°53′E; Agordat
- Date: 12 July 1962
- Deaths: 8
- Injuries: Several
- Perpetrator: Eritrean Liberation Front

The Agordat Operation was part of the Eritrean War of Independence, and took place on 12 July 1962.

It was intended to kill the Ethiopia's Representative in Eritrea, General Abiye Abebe, and other dignitaries who included Asfaha Woldemichael, the head of the Eritrean government and Hamid Ferej, president of the Assembly, who traveled to Agordat that day to address the soldiers and police and to intimidate the residents of Agordat who by that time were receiving news of the movements of the Eritrean Liberation Front on a daily basis.

In the operation, the Eritrean Liberation Front was able to kill 8 Ethiopian dignitaries, while wounding several others. The plan's main target, Abiye Abebe, was not one of the 8 killed. It was planned by Mohamoud Mohamed Salih (Hanjemenjee), and executed by Adem Mohammed Hamid (Ghidifil).

== Sources ==
"From the Experiences of the Eritrean Liberation Army (ELA)". Archived from the original on 2009-09-26.
