= Adejare =

Nigerian given name

- Gender: Unisex

Origin
- Language: Yoruba
- Origin: Nigerian
- Meaning: The crown is justified
- Region of origin: South -West Nigeria

Other names
- Variant forms: Dejare; Jare

Adéjàre is a Nigerian unisex name of Yoruba origin which means "The crown is justified". Adejare is commonly used as both given name and surname.

Its diminutive form is Jare.

== Notable people bearing the name ==
- Enoch Adeboye (Enoch Adejare Adeboye), Nigerian pastor
- Samuel Babatunde Adejare, Medical practitioner
