= The Journal of Supercomputing =

Academic computer science journal

- Discipline: Computer science
- Language: English
- Edited by: Hamid Arabnia

Publication details
- History: 1987–present
- Publisher: Springer (United States)
- Frequency: Triannual
- Impact factor: 3.3 (2022)

Standard abbreviations
- ISO 4: J. Supercomput.

Indexing
- ISSN: 0920-8542 (print); 1573-0484 (web)

Links
- Journal homepage

The Journal of Supercomputing is an academic computer science journal concerned with theoretical and practical aspects of supercomputing. Tutorial and survey papers are also included.
