= Hameed Adewale =

Nigerian politician

Hameed Adewale Waheed

Member of the House of Representatives of Nigeria for Agege constituency
- In office 2023–2027
- Preceded by: Samuel Babatunde Adejare

Personal details
- Party: All Progressives Congress (Nigeria) (APC)

Hameed Adewale is a Nigerian politician who serves in the House of Representatives representing the Agege Federal Constituency of Lagos State. He is a member of the All Progressives Congress (APC).

== Career ==
Adewale was elected to the House of Representatives in the 2023 Nigerian general election. He won the Agege Federal Constituency seat after receiving 27,445 votes, defeating his closest opponent, Sola Osolana of the People's Democratic Party (PDP), who received 13,379 votes.

In the House, he has supported legislation related to public sector reform and national orientation initiatives. He has also been involved in discussions on workforce development and the improvement of administrative structures within federal institutions.

== Political positions ==
Adewale has supported proposals to extend the retirement age of health workers to address workforce shortages in the sector.
