= Karam Soliman =

American-Egyptian pharmacologist

- Born: October 15, 1944 (age 81); Cairo
- Education: University of Georgia (PhD); Cairo University (BS)
- Scientific career
- Fields: Pharmacology, Neuroscience, Cell Biology
- Institutions: College of Pharmacy and Pharmaceutical Sciences Florida A&M University
- Doctoral students: Hamid Reza Rasekh

Karam Farah Attia Soliman (born October 15, 1944) is an American-Egyptian pharmacologist and distinguished professor of pharmaceutical sciences at Florida A&M University.
