= Masoud Emami Yeganeh =

Iranian politician (b. 1978)

- مسعود امامی یگانه
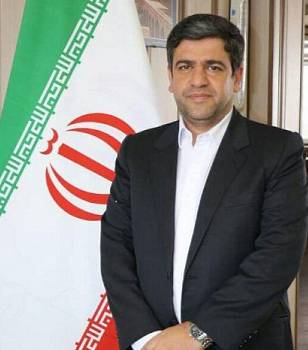

Governor General of Ardabil
- Incumbent
- Assumed office 17 November 2024
- President: Masoud Pezeshkian
- Preceded by: Hamed Ameli

Personal details
- Born: 12 January 1978 (age 48) Ardabil, Imperial State of Iran
- Party: Independent (Reform-oriented)
- Children: 1 son
- Education: Islamic Azad University
- Occupation: Architect and politician
- Profession: Architecture (Ph.D. student), Civil Engineering and Urban Management, Agricultural Engineering, English (IELTS certified)

Masoud Emami Yeganeh (Persian: مسعود امامی یگانه; born 12 January 1978) is an Iranian politician and architect who serves as the 11th Governor of Ardabil Province. He previously held several administrative positions in Ardabil Province, including Deputy Governor for Development Affairs and Governor of Ardabil County.

== Early life and education ==
Emami Yeganeh was born in the Aref neighborhood of Ardabil. His father was a teacher, and his grandfather was Mirza Reza Emami Yeganeh, a calligrapher and preacher during the Pahlavi era. His brother, Alireza Emami Yeganeh, was a volunteer soldier in the 31st Ashura Division who was killed during the Iran–Iraq War.

He studied at Andarzgou High School in Ardabil and entered university in 1996. While at Islamic Azad University, he helped establish the university's first student political organization, the Islamic Association of Students. He graduated with a degree in Agricultural Engineering in 2000, later pursuing architecture due to his interest in art and design. He obtained his bachelor's degree in Architecture in 2015 and master's degree in 2017. As of 2022, he is pursuing a Ph.D. in Architecture at Islamic Azad University.

Emami Yeganeh is a distinguished member of the Iranian Calligraphers Association and holds an IELTS certification in English.

== Political career ==
While politically independent with reformist leanings, Emami Yeganeh has held several key administrative positions:

- Deputy Governor for Development Affairs, Ardabil Province.
- Director General of Urban Affairs and Councils, Ardabil Province.
- Director General of Crisis Management, Ardabil Province.
- Director General of Governor's Office, Ardabil Province
- Director General of Public Relations and International Affairs, Ardabil Province
- In the 2024 Iranian presidential election, he served as the head of Masoud Pezeshkian's campaign headquarters in Ardabil Province.

== Academic work ==
He has published several academic papers on architecture, including:

- "Examining the Relationships and Influences Between Architecture and Calligraphy Art"
- "The Role of Interfering Components in Enhancing the Historical Identity of the City in Ardabil's Historical Schools"
- "Effective Factors in Architectural Design of Buildings with Passive Defense Approach"
