= Hamit =

Hamit is the Turkish spelling of the Arabic masculine given name Hamid.

People named Hamit include:

- Hamit Akbay (born 1900), Turkish footballer
- Hamit Altıntop (born 1982), Turkish footballer
- Hamit Arslan (born 1894), Turkish footballer
- Hamit Geylani (1947–2025), Turkish politician
- Hamit Hasancan (1870–1943), Turkish politician and economist
- Hamit Kaplan (1934–1976), Turkish sport wrestler
- Hamit Karakus (born 1965), Dutch politician
- Hamit Hüsnü Kayacan (1868–1952), Turkish intellectual and sports executive
- Hamit Zübeyir Koşay (1897–1984), Turkish archaeologist
- Hamit Yildiz (born 1987), Turkish footballer
