= Hamid al-Din =

Hamid al-Din is a Muslim male name formed from the elements Ḥamid and ad-Din. Its variants include Hamid al-Din, Hamiduddin, and Hameeduddin.

== Hamid al-Din ==
- Hamid al-Din al-Kirmani (996–1021), Persian Isma'ili scholar
- Hamidüddin Aksarayî (1331–1412), also known as Somuncu Baba, Turkish Islamic teacher
- Muhammad bin Yahya Hamid ad-Din (1839–1904), Imam of Yemen
- Yahya Muhammad Hamid ed-Din (1869–1948), Imam of Yemen

== Hameeduddin ==
- Hameeduddin Aquil Husami, Indian Islamic scholar
- Pir Hameeduddin Sialvi, Pakistani spiritual leader and politician
- Mohammed Hameeduddin, American former mayor

== Hamiduddin ==
- Hamiduddin Farahi (1863–1930), British Indian Islamic scholar
