= The Waterman's Prophecy =

Sudanese novel

- Cover page
- Author: Hamid Al-Nazer
- Original title: نبوءة السقّا
- Language: Arabic
- Genre: Fiction
- Publisher: Dar al-Tanwir
- Publication date: 2015
- Publication place: Lebanon

The Waterman's Prophecy (Arabic: نبوءة السقّا) is a novel by the Sudanese author Hamid el-Nazer. The novel was first published in 2015 by Dar al-Tanwir for publishing and distribution in Beirut. It was longlisted for the international award for the Arabic novel in 2016, known as the Arabic Booker award.

== About the novel ==
In The Waterman's prophecy, the Sudanese writer Hamid el-Nazer tells a story that took place in the sixties of the last century in the town of Ajaib, which is located on the hills near the Eritrean coast. The "grandchildren" seek to be liberated from enslavement at the hands of their loyalists "the pegs." The "commander", who has wide authority, proposes to marry the beautiful "Fatima" who belongs to the grandchildren, and the grandchildren view the matter as an important opportunity that may achieve their freedom based on an ancient mysterious prophecy they inherited that ensures their liberation from slavery, while the pegs are suspicious of that step. This conflict coincides with the outbreak of the armed revolution in Eritrea for independence from Ethiopia. The revolution, with its successes and failures, and the struggles led by it, constitute a broad temporal and objective background for the overall events of the novel.

== See also ==
- Hamid Al-Nazer
