= Hamid Mohamed Azim =

Egyptian volleyball player (born 1956)

Personal information
- Nationality: Egyptian
- Born: 3 June 1956 (age 68)

Sport
- Sport: Volleyball

Hamid Mohamed Azim (born 3 June 1956) is an Egyptian volleyball player. He competed in the men's tournament at the 1976 Summer Olympics.
