= Hamed Diane Séméga =

High Commissioner for the Organization for the Development of the Senegal River
- In office May 17, 2017 – 2021

Minister of Transport of Mali
- In office October 3, 2007 – March 22, 2012

Minister of Mines, Energy, and Water
- In office June 15, 2002 – October 3, 2007

Personal details
- Born: April 10, 1962 (age 64) Dakar, Senegal
- Education: National School of Administration, Bamako

Hamed Diane Séméga is a Malian politician and businessman who served as the Malian Minister of Mines, Energy, and Water between 2002 and 2007 and as High Commissioner for the Organization for the Development of the Senegal River between 2017 and 2021.

== Biography ==
Séméga was born in Dakar, Senegal on April 10, 1962. He attended the National School of Administration in Bamako, and served as the administrative director of Canadian Mali Gold Corporation between 1990 and 1992. Séméga then held the position as director of operations for USM Industries in Mali between 1992 and 1994, and as administrative director of Golden Star Resources between 1994 and 1997.

Séméga began his political career in 2002, being appointed as the Minister of Mines, Energy, and Water under Amadou Toumani Touré, serving as the minister until October 2007. In November 2005, Séméga facilitated the sale of shares of Bouygues into the Energie du Mali state-owned company. Between 2007 and 2012, he served as the Minister of Equipment and Transport of Mali.

In May 2017, Séméga was appointed as the High Commissioner of the Organization for the Development for the Senegal River (OMVS). He was commissioner for a four-year term. In 2021, before the 2021 Malian coup d'état, Séméga was preparing his candidacy for the 2022 Malian presidential election.
