= Hamid al-'Imadi =

- Born: 1692; Damascus
- Died: 1758 (aged 65–66); Damascus
- Citizenship: Syrian
- Occupations: Writer, Author and Jurisprudent
- Notable work: Al-Athaf to explain the Scout sermon Refusal to listen to Lou's statement. To abstain In opium In the coffee The strongest statement in defining the case

Hamid al-'Imadi, whose full name is Hamid bin Ali bin Ibrahim bin Abd al-Rahim bin Imad al-Din bin Muhib al-Din al-Hanafi al-Dimashqi (1692 - 1758), is the Hanafi mufti in Damascus and the son of its mufti was a scholar, researcher and writer.

== Early life ==
Hamed Al-Amadi was born in Damascus on a Wednesday, the tenth of Jumada II, 1103 Hijri and grew up and read the Quran and worked on a group. Learn when a number of sheikhs, including Sheikh Abu al-Talions, Mufti al-Hanhawail and attended his lessons in Umayy, Aliagochia and his favors as well as Sheikh Mohammed bin Ali Al-Kamali attended and preached in the Umayyad and his favors and his favors and took him as well as Sheikh Elias Kurdi A group of small and taking a group in the Haramain and his aggraes from them Sheikh Abdullah bin Salem Al-Basri Makki and Sheikh Ahmed Al-Nakhli Makki, Sheikh Mohammed Al-Askandari and then the Makki and his interpretation, which was the systems in ten volumes, including Sheikh Abdul Karim al-Hindi, the inmate of Damascus also read to him various sciences and took from him and approved by Sheikh Abdul Jalil Al-Mawahabi Al-Hanbali, including Sheikh Ahmed Al-Ghazi, the Shafi’i Mufti in Damascus, Sheikh Muhammad Al-Khalili and Sheikh Ali Al-Tadmari, and he took it from his uncle Muhammad bin Ibrahim Al-Emadi.

He performed pilgrimage when he was young, so he took on behalf of a group in the AL Haramain, and they permitted him, including Sheikh Abdullah bin Salem Al-Basri Al-Makki, Sheikh Ahmad Al-Nakhli Al-Makki, Sheikh Muhammad Al-Iskanari, then Al-Makki, and endowed him with his interpretation of which he composed the systems in ten volumes, including Sheikh Abdul Karim Al-Hindi, the resident of Makkah and Sheikh Taj Al-Din Al-Qala’i Al-Makki. Muhammad al-Walidy al-Makki, Sheikh Muhammad Aqeelah al-Makki, Sheikh Abd al-Karim bin Abdullah, the Abbasid caliph al-Madani, and Sheikh Muhammad Abu al-Taher al-Kurani al-Madani and others, among the Roman scholars, took from Ahmad, who is known as the military judge in the upper house of the Sultanate, and the dowry of the translator.

== Career Path ==
Hamid studied at the Umayyad Mosque and then became a mufti in the middle of Ramadan in the year one hundred and thirty-seven and began studying in Sulaymaniyah in the Green Square and opened in his lessons sermons from its establishment and collected them, which amounted to a huge volume. He has authored letters, including “Sharh al-Iddah” and among his letters “Al-Durr al-Mustabbaf fi Muwafaqat Umar ibn al-Khattab, may God be pleased with him” and among them are “Al-Houqla in the earthquake” and among them “In the saying of the Most High, in your hand is goodness” and also “In the permissibility of a sister’s marriage a day after the death of her sister” and among them Issues scattered, including “Al-Athhaf to explain the sermon of the Scouts,” including “the denunciation of listening in a testimony if to abstain,” including “in opium,” including “in coffee,” including “the strongest saying in defining the case,” including “spring blossom in assisting the intercessor,” and among them the differing opinions of investigators regarding the return of the beholder of the deserving, including the detail in the difference between interpretation and interpretation, including the return in the statement of the prayer, including “the light of the morning in the translation of our master Abu Ubaidah bin Al-Jarrah, may God be pleased with him” and among them in repelling the plague, and including the lamp of the farmer in the opening prayer, and including the union of the two moons in the two houses of Raqqa and among them is the shining in the prohibition Fun, including in a research from her research, including the falling of the sin in the marriage of the jinn, including the luxurious prayers in the frequent hadiths, including salvation from the guarantee of the joint and private hire, including the manifestation of the oath of memorization, including the Sunni demands of the attic fatwa, including the Hamidiyah in the difference between private and private, including the right The insincerity of the unseen in the divine submission, including the apple of the eye, the most abundant line in the translation of Sheikh Muhyi al-Din al-Akbar, may his secret be sanctified, including the grant of al-Manah in the explanation of Badi’ Misbah al-Falah, including the righteousness of the world with the fatwa of the world, including the wife of Al-Maghani in the multiplicity of slander, including the beauty of the image and the beard in the translation of Sidi Dihia, may God be pleased with him, including the contract The precious in the translation of the owner of the guidance Burhan Al-Din and a collection of poetry, correspondences, etc.

== List of his works ==
This is a list of the most prominent works of the Syrian writer and author Hamid Al-Emadi:

- Explanation of clarification ( Original title: Sharh al'iidah ).
- Al-Durr Al-Mustab in the approvals of our master Omar Ibn Al-Khattab, may God be pleased with him ( Original title: Aldur almustatab fi muafaqat sayidna eumar bn alkhataab radi allah eanh ).
- The Alhawqal in the earthquake ( Original title: Alhawqalat fi alzalzala ).
- In the Almighty's saying, in your hand is goodness ( Original title: Fi kawhihi taealaa biadik alkhayr ).
- It is permissible to marry a sister one day after her sister's death ( Original title: Fi jawaz nikah al'ukht baed mawt 'ukhtiha biawm ).
- Al-Athaf to explain the Scout sermon ( Original title: Al'atihaf lisharh khutbat alkashaf ).
- Refusal to be heard in Lou's statement to abstain( Original title: Tashnif al'iismae fi 'iifadat law lilaimtinae ).
- In the opium ( Original title: Fi al'afiun ).
- In the coffee ( Original title: Fi alqahwa ).
- The strongest saying in defining the lawsuit ( Original title: Alqawl al'aqwaa fi taerif aldaewaa ).
- Primrose in the help of the intercessor ( Original title: Zahr alrabie fi musaeadat alshafie)
- The investigators' differing opinions regarding the return of the beholder( Original title: Akhtilaf 'ara' almuhaqiqin fi rujuea alnaazir ).
- Morning light in the translation of our master Abu Ubaidah bin Al-Jarrah, may God be pleased with him ( Original title: Daw' alsabah fi tarjamat sayidna 'abu obaydat bin aljaraah radi allah eanh ).
