= Hamed Shirkanlou =

Iranian footballer

Personal information
- Full name: Hamed Shirkanlou
- Place of birth: Iran
- Position: Striker

Senior career*
Years	Team	Apps	(Gls)
2004–2005	Aboomoslem	?	(1)
2008–2012	Mes Sarcheshmeh	?	(8)
- * Club domestic league appearances and goals as of 8 August 2011 ‡ National team caps and goals as of 25 November 2010

Hamed Shirkhanlou is an Iranian football player who last played for Mes Sarcheshmeh of the IPL.

== Career ==
Shirkhanlou played a season for Aboomoslem in 2004. Since 2008, he has been playing for Mes Sarcheshmeh.

Club performance			League		Cup		Continental		Total	
Season	Club	League	Apps	Goals	Apps	Goals	Apps	Goals	Apps	Goals
Iran			League		Hazfi Cup		Asia		Total	
2004–05	Aboomoslem	Pro League	?	1		0	-	-		0
2008–09	Mes SCH	Division 1	?	3		0	-	-		0
2009–10	Mes SCH	Division 1	23	3		0	-	-		0
2010–11	Mes SCH	Division 1	20	2		0	-	-		0
2011–12	Mes SCH	Pro League	7	0			-	-		
Career total										

== External sources ==
- Profile at Persianleague
