= Hamed Soltani =

Iranian television presenter

- حامد سلطانی
- Born: Hamed Soltani; Mashhad, Iran
- Education: Graphics
- Occupations: Producer; Presenter; Director
- Years active: Director (Since 2002); Presenter (Since 2002); Producer (Since 2003)
- Employer: Islamic Republic of Iran Broadcasting
- Known for: The prodigies from IRIB TV3; Hosseinieh Moali
- Television: The prodigies; Hosseinieh Moali; with chat; Meydoon
- Height: 1.86 m (6 ft 1 in)

Hamed Soltani (Persian: حامد سلطانی; born in Mashhad) is an Iranian producer, television presenter, and director.

== Career ==
Soltani has a bachelor's degree in graphic arts and started his career by cooperating with the cultural unit of Astan Quds. Then, as an activist of the Cultural Front of the Islamic Revolution, he quickly grew in his work (hosting).

== Executives ==
- The prodigies
- Hosseinieh Moali
