= Hamed Rezaei =

Iranian volleyball player

Personal information
- Born: 1983 (age 42–43); Urmia, Iran
- Height: 2.04 cm (1 in)
- Weight: 92 kg (203 lb)

Volleyball information
- Position: Middle-blocker/Outside Hitter
- Current club: (Iran) Shardari Urmia
- Number: 3

Career
Teams
	(Iran) Shardari Urmia (Iran) Saipa (Iran) Paykan (Iran) Giti Pasand (Iran) Shahrdari Tabriz (Iran) Shahrdari Urmia

Hamed Rezaei (Persian: حامد رضایی, was born 1983 in Urmia, West Azerbaijan) is a volleyball player from Iran, who plays as a Middle-blocker & Central defender for Shahrdari Urmia VC in Iranian Volleyball Super League. He was invited to the Men's National Team for the 2015 FIVB Volleyball World League.
