= Hamed Zolfaghari =

Iranian documentary filmmaker

Hamed Zolfaghari (Persian: حامد ذوالفقاری) is an Iranian documentary filmmaker and producer. He is known for the feature documentaries Women of the Sun: A Chronology of Seeing (2020) and Vanishing Tracks (2026). His work has been discussed in relation to participatory filmmaking, collaborative authorship, gender, spectatorship and rural social change in Iran.

== Life and career ==
Zolfaghari is an Iranian documentary filmmaker. According to BBC Persian, he began filmmaking in the 2000s and was among the founders of the Shiraz Short Film Association and Festival.

In a 2020 interview published by the Montreal International Documentary Festival, Zolfaghari said that Women of the Sun grew out of his earlier work with non-governmental organizations on environmental activities and local people's rights in Iran and abroad.

== Works ==
=== Women of the Sun: A Chronology of Seeing ===
Women of the Sun: A Chronology of Seeing is a 2020 feature documentary follows a group of women in ShafiAbad, a village in Kerman Province, who use cameras while organizing a cooperative for their handicraft work.

The film is an Iran-France production with a runtime of 87 minutes. Film-documentaire.fr lists Agat Films & Cie as producer, Crazy Woodpecker Film Studio and Ex Nihilo as co-producers, and ARTE France as broadcaster.

Women of the Sun had its world premiere in the International Spectrum section of the 2020 Hot Docs Canadian International Documentary Festival. It was later presented by the Montreal International Documentary Festival in the Challenging Power section. The film was also shown at One World Romania.

Radio Farda reviewed the film during Hot Docs 2020 and described it as a workshop-based documentary made with women in a village in Kerman Province. BBC Persian later covered the film on its Aparat programme. Academic writing on the film has examined its use of participatory video, collaborative filmmaking, gender, representation and rural social relations in Iran.

=== Vanishing Tracks ===
Vanishing Tracks is a 2026 documentary follows a Qashqai nomadic family near Shiraz as the family faces the loss of sheep, changing migration routes and the expansion of the city.

The film is an Iran, France, Norway, South Korea and Qatar co-production with a runtime of 93 minutes. It had its world premiere in the International Spectrum Competition at Hot Docs 2026. It was selected for the Viewpoints section of the 2026 Tribeca Festival, where it was listed as a United States premiere.

POV Magazine described Vanishing Tracks as a documentary about a Qashqai family and the pressure of cultural and urban change on nomadic life. Cinema Without Borders wrote that the film engages with time, memory and the transformation of nomadic life in Iran.

== Style and themes ==
Zolfaghari's documentaries use participatory and observational approaches. Women of the Sun has been discussed as a participatory film in which rural women use cameras to represent their own work, social position and collective activity. Vanishing Tracks uses an observational approach to migration, family life, memory and the decline of traditional nomadic routes.

== Filmography ==
Year	Title	Role	Notes
2012	Black Winds of Abolhasani Village	Director, researcher	Selected for Cinema Verite Film Festival
2015	Passion of Ebram	Director, researcher	Documentary about Ebrahim Monsefi
2016	The Color of Soil	Director, researcher, designer	Screened at the Iranian Film Festival in Munich and listed by EASA 2016
2020	Women of the Sun: A Chronology of Seeing	Director, producer	World premiere, Hot Docs 2020
2026	Vanishing Tracks	Director, producer, writer, editor	World premiere, Hot Docs 2026; Viewpoints, Tribeca Festival 2026
