= Hamid Barole Abdu =

Eritrean writer

- Born: October 10, 1953 (age 72); Asmara, Ethiopia
- Occupations: Poet; Writer

Hamid Barole Abdu (born October 10, 1953) is an Eritrean writer.

After studying literature in Eritrea, he moved to Modena, Italy, in 1974, where he has worked as an intercultural expert and has published several articles about the migratory phenomenon.

== Works ==
- Hamid Barole Abdu. Eritrea: una cultura da salvare. Ufficio Stampa del Comune di Reggio Emilia, 1986.
- Hamid Barole Abdu. Akhria - io sradicato poeta per fame. Reggio Emilia, Libreria del Teatro, 1996.
- Hamid Barole Abdu. Sogni ed incubi di un clandestino. Udine, AIET, 2001. ISBN 978-88-88090-72-6.
- Hamid Barole Abdu. Seppellite la mia pelle in Africa. Modena, Artestampa, 2006. ISBN 88-89123-24-9.
- Hamid Barole Abdu. Il volo di Mohammed. Faenza (RA), Artestampa, 2009. ISBN 978-88-88090-72-6.
- Hamid Barole Abdu. Rinnoversi in segni ... erranti. Faenza (RA), GraficLine, 2013.
- Hamid Barole Abdu. Poems across the pearl of Africa. Faenza (RA), GraficLine, 2015.
