= Hamid Rashid Maʽala =

Iraqi politician (died 2021)

Member of the Council of Representatives of Iraq
- In office 2005–2010

Personal details
- Died: 3 May 2021
- Party: National Wisdom Movement

Hamid Rashid Maʽala (Arabic: حميد رشيد معلة; died 3 May 2021) was an Iraqi politician.

== Biography ==
A member of the National Wisdom Movement, he served on the Council of Representatives of Iraq from 2005 to 2010. He was appointed president of the National Wisdom Movement when the coalition was created in 2017.

He died on 3 May 2021 following health complications caused by the COVID-19 virus.
