= Hamid bin Abdallah al-Ali =

Kuwaiti cleric

Hamid bin Abdallah al-Ali (born 1960) has been described as "an influential Salafi cleric" based in Kuwait, whom the U.S. Treasury Department has described as "an Al Qaeda facilitator and fundraiser."

However, following the release of Sayyed Imam Al-Sharif's anti-terrorist manifesto Rationalizing Jihad in Egypt and the World, he is reported to have "declared on a Web site that he welcomed the rejection of violence as a means of fostering change in the Arab world".

== Background ==
Born in 1960, al-Ali is married with five children. He was a primary education teacher in Kuwait, where he taught Islamic studies. He studied Sharia at the Islamic University of Madinah from 1979 until 1988, receiving a master's degree in Tafsir and Quranic studies.

After returning to Kuwait, al-Ali served as a professor of Islamic studies at Kuwait University for several years. He rose to the position of general secretary of al-Harakat al-Salafiyya fil-Kuwait (The Salafi Movement of Kuwait) by 1991, a position he maintained until 1999.

He was arrested and received a suspended sentence after published fatwas declaring Kuwait and other governments kuffar (unbelievers) and thus lawful targets for the mujahideen — for supporting non-Islamic countries' aggression against the Muslim world.

Months before the 9/11 attack, al-Ali issued a fatwa authorizing the flying of aircraft into targets during suicide operations, leading some to characterize his fatwas as linked to Al Qaeda actions.

On Iraq, al-Ali drew a distinction between all Iraqi Shia and those who actively support and assist Iran, with dialogue between Salafis and the former being acceptable, but not with the latter.

== Alleged ties to terrorism ==
The Telegraph reported that al-Ali posted content on his website describing how to make chemical and biological weapons, as well as fatwas endorsing suicide bombing, detailing “the permissiveness, and sometimes necessity, of suicide operations on the condition of crushing the enemy…in modern times, this can be accomplished by bringing down an aeroplane on an important site that causes the enemy great casualties.”

al-Ali has also publicly revered the Al-Nusra Front as “heroes” on social media, and, according to YouTube footage seen by The Sunday Telegraph, praised the group’s “great jihad” in Syria during a sermon he delivered on March 2, 2012, at state-controlled Qatar Grand Mosque in Doha. He was invited to deliver this speech by the Qatari Ministry of Endowment and Islamic Affairs. It is these types of invitations that have led to Qatar being labeled as a “permissive” environment for terrorist groups such as Hamas, al Qaeda, al Nusra, and ISIS and led to widespread condemnation for Qatar’s state-sponsorship of terrorism.

On January 16, 2008, the United Nations listed al-Ali as an individual associated with Al Qaeda on their website. According to the U.S. Treasury department, al-Al is also a self-reported “Al Qaeda commando”.

He has facilitated the transfer of funds, weapons, supplies and fighters to and from Syria for the Al-Nusra Front, sometimes using Kuwaiti students as couriers for the materials.

== U.S. Department of Treasury designation ==
On December 7, 2006, the U.S. Department of the Treasury added al-Ali to its list of Specially Designated Global Terrorists, pursuant to Executive Order 13224, as a terrorist facilitator for providing financial support to Al Qaeda and other terrorist organizations. Specifically, al-Ali was a religious leader of a Kuwait-based terrorist cell and a recruiter of jihadists on behalf of Al Qaeda in both Iraq and Kuwait. He was also involved in the plotting of a foiled attack on U.S. and Kuwaiti targets in 2005. As outlined by the U.S. Treasury department, “this designation freezes any assets the designees may have under U.S. jurisdiction and prohibits all financial and commercial transactions by any U.S. person with the designees. In addition, in accordance with U.N. Security Council Resolution 1624, the U.S. Government condemns those who incite others to acts of terrorism and violence”.

== See also ==
- Sayyed Imam Al-Sharif
