= Hamed Sarlak =

Iranian footballer

Personal information
- Full name: Hamed Sarlak
- Date of birth: 11 June 1989 (age 37)
- Place of birth: Iran
- Height: 1.83 m (6 ft 0 in)
- Position: Midfielder

Team information
- Current team: Sanat Naft Abadan F.C.
- Number: 13

Youth career
- Sanat Naft Abadan F.C.

Senior career*
| Years | Team | Apps | (Gls) |
| 2011– | Sanat Naft Abadan F.C. | 26 | (2) |
- * Club domestic league appearances and goals

Hamed Sarlak (Persian: حامد سرلک) is an Iranian footballer who plays for Sanat Naft Abadan F.C. in the IPL.
