= Hameed Adekunle Makama Oyelude =

Nigerian royalty

Hameed Adekunle Makama Oyelude Tegbosun III, popularly known as Olowu of Kuta, is a member of a Nigerian royal family and the incumbent Olowu of Kuta.

== Early life and career ==
Oyelude was born in 1964 at Kuta, Osun State. His parents were the direct descendants of the founder of Kuta Kingdom. He ascended the throne of his forefathers on 15 September 2012. He is the Permanent Chairman of the Royal Council of all Owu Obas and Chiefs in Yoruba land.

In 2015, he initiated a national advocacy program in support of the Nigerian Army.

== Education ==
Oyelude attended African Church Primary School, Kuta for his elementary education. He also attended African Church Secondary Modern School, Kuta/Ileogbo. He also has a certificate in Structural Designs and Development, Diploma in Integrated Structural Systems, and BSc. Civil Engineering.

== Awards ==
In May 2023, he was conferred with a Nigerian national honor of Commander Of The Order Of The Federal Republic (CON) by President Muhammadu Buhari.
