= Hamid Kerayechian =

Iranian-American business executive and entrepreneur

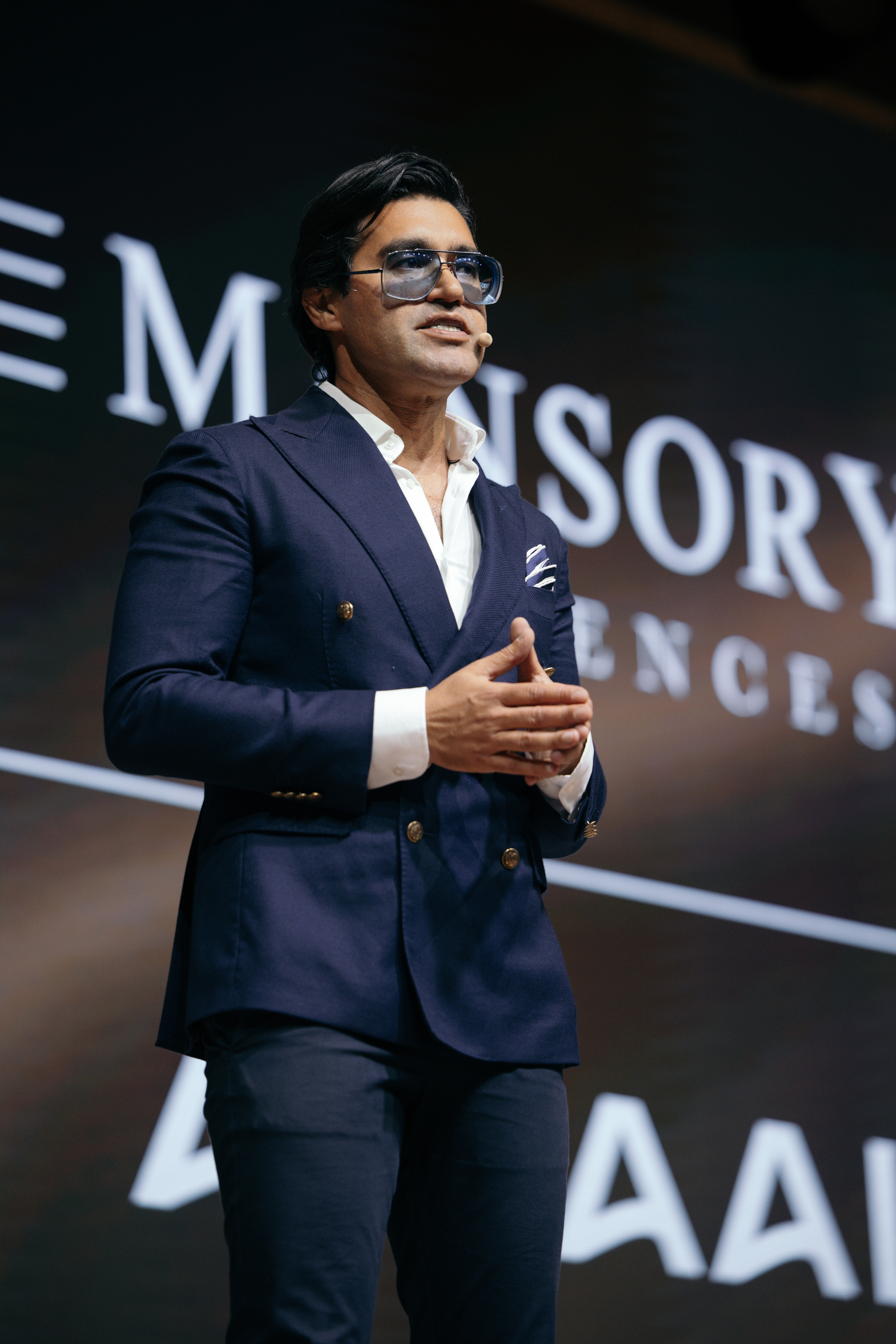
- Born: Colorado, United States
- Education: University of Southern California
- Occupations: Business executive, entrepreneur
- Known for: Ayana Holding, VX Studio
- Website: https://hamidkerayechian.com/

Hamid Kerayechian is an American business executive and entrepreneur based in Dubai, United Arab Emirates. He is the co-founder and CEO of Ayana Holding, an investment and development group, and the co-founder and CEO of VX Studio, an architectural design and development consultancy.

== Early life and education ==
Kerayechian was born on 1 April 1979 in Colorado, United States.

He got higher education in California and obtained a Master of Science degree in Civil Engineering from the University of Southern California in the early 2000s.

After education, Kerayechian began his professional career in the United States before relocating to Dubai in 2008.

== Career ==
From 2006 to 2008, Kerayechian worked as a development manager at WD Partners. In 2008, Kerayechian relocated to Dubai and joined Emaar Properties, a real estate development company in the Middle East. He held the position of senior development manager until 2014.

In October 2011, Kerayechian co-founded VX Studio (formerly VE Experts) and became its CEO and founding partner. The company provides architectural design, development management, and consultancy services for residential, commercial, mixed-use, and hospitality projects.

In February 2015, Kerayechian co-founded Ayana Holding and took the role of CEO and founding partner. The company manages a portfolio of businesses involved in real estate investment and development. In 2016, he co-founded Opaal Interiors, a firm providing interior design services in the UAE.

In 2017, Kerayechian co-founded Detay Living, an interior furnishing and bespoke furniture company serving both commercial and residential clients.

In 2018, Kerayechian was included in "Dubai's Most Influential People," "40 Under 40" and "Most Inspiring Leaders in the Middle East" rankings by Arabian Business. He also received recognition as one of the "Most Admired Leaders of Asia" and "Young CEO of the Year" by CEO Middle East magazine. In the same year, he became a founding partner of M2L Concepts, a Dubai-based interactive entertainment and technology company.

In 2019, Kerayechian was named Entrepreneur of the Year at the Construction Innovation Awards, presented by Construction Business. The same year, Ayana Holding was awarded Best Diversified Holding Company at the Real Estate Awards by Arabian Business.

Kerayechian is a founding partner of WRKBAY, a coworking space concept. In addition, he is a partner in XPLOR, a technology venture aimed at introducing digital and proptech solutions to the real estate industry.
