= Hamid Zarbaf =

Dutch footballer

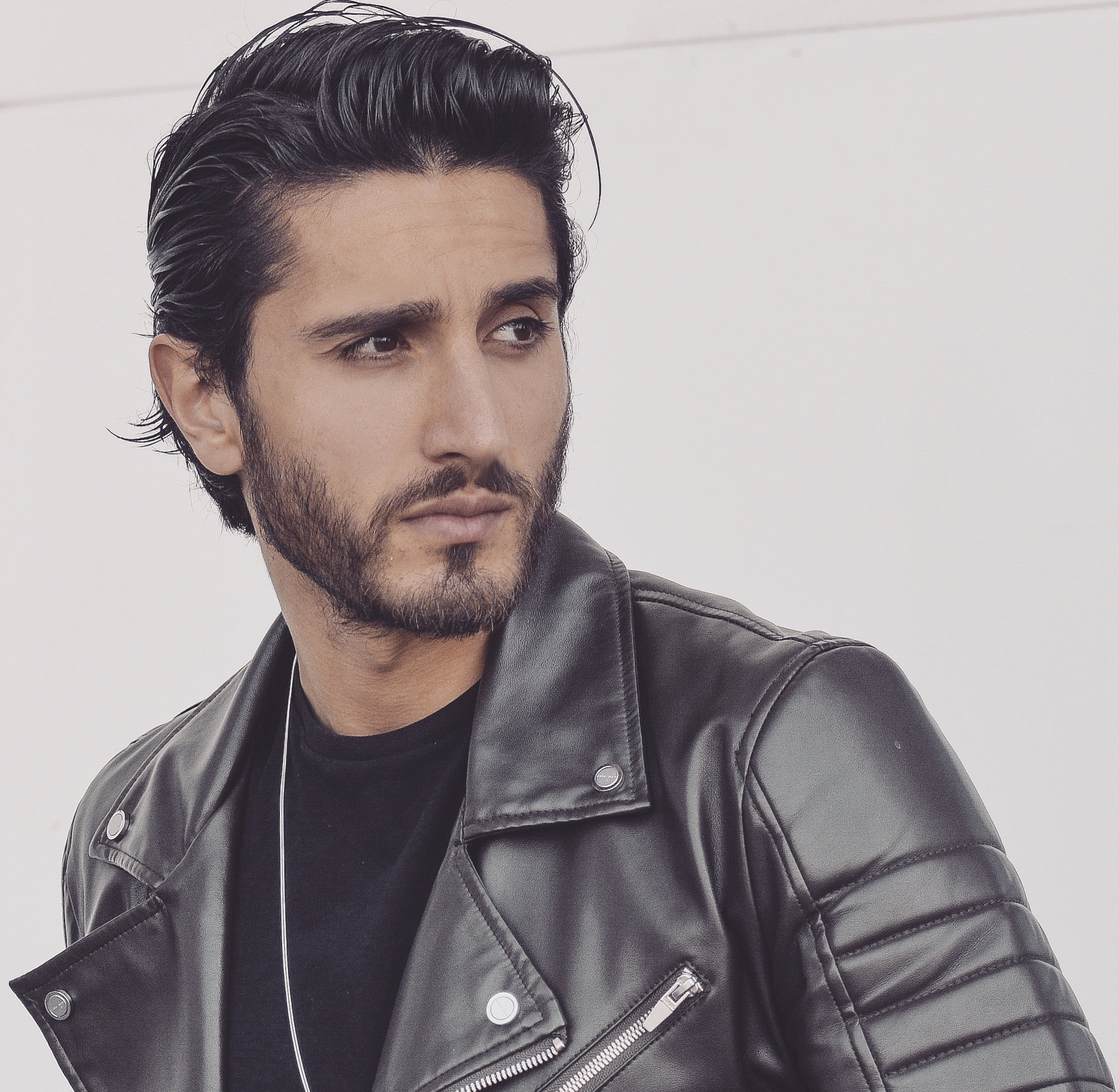

Personal information
- Full name: Hamid Haji Jafar Zarbaf
- Date of birth: 22 August 1990 (age 36)
- Place of birth: Deventer, Netherlands
- Position: Defender

Youth career
- 199?–2001: SV Helios
- 2001–2005: Go Ahead Eagles
- 2005–2009: SV Helios

Senior career*
Years	Team	Apps	(Gls)
2009–2011	SV Helios		
2011–2012	Koninklijke UD		
2012	CSV Apeldoorn		
2013–2015	Rohda Raalte		
2015–2017	HHC Hardenberg	73	(0)
2018	Go Ahead Eagles	5	(0)
- * Club domestic league appearances and goals as of 11:41, 14 February 2021 (UTC)

Hamid Haji Jafar Zarbaf (born 22 August 1990) is a Dutch footballer who most recently played for Go Ahead Eagles, as a defender.

== Career ==
Zarbaf began his early career in amateur football with SV Helios, Koninklijke UD, CSV Apeldoorn, Rohda Raalte and HHC Hardenberg. He turned professional after signing for Go Ahead Eagles in January 2018. In June 2018, his contract was terminated by mutual consent.

== Personal life ==
Zarbaf is of Iranian heritage.

== Career statistics ==
As of 9 May 2018

Club	Division	Season	League		Cup		Other		Total	
Club	Division	Season	Apps	Goals	Apps	Goals	Apps	Goals	Apps	Goals
HHC Hardenberg	Derde Divisie	2015–16	29	0	4	0	0	0	33	0
HHC Hardenberg	Tweede Divisie	2016–17	29	0	1	0	0	0	30	0
HHC Hardenberg	Tweede Divisie	2017–18	15	0	2	0	0	0	17	0
HHC Hardenberg	Totals		73	0	7	0	0	0	80	0
Go Ahead Eagles	Eerste Divisie	2017–18	5	0	0	0	0	0	5	0
Career total			78	0	7	0	0	0	85	0
