= Hamid Babatunde Eesuola =

Nigerian politician

State Representative
- Constituency: Atiba

Personal details
- Died: October 31, 2024
- Party: Peoples Democratic Party (PDP)
- Occupation: Politician

Hamid Babatunde Eesuola was a Nigerian politician and lawmaker who represented Atiba State Constituency in the Oyo State House of Assembly under the platform of the Peoples Democratic Party (PDP). He was also the Chairman, Oyo State Community and Social Development Agency (OYCSDA). He died on October 31, 2024 after a brief illness.
