= Hamid Yousefi =

Iranian film director

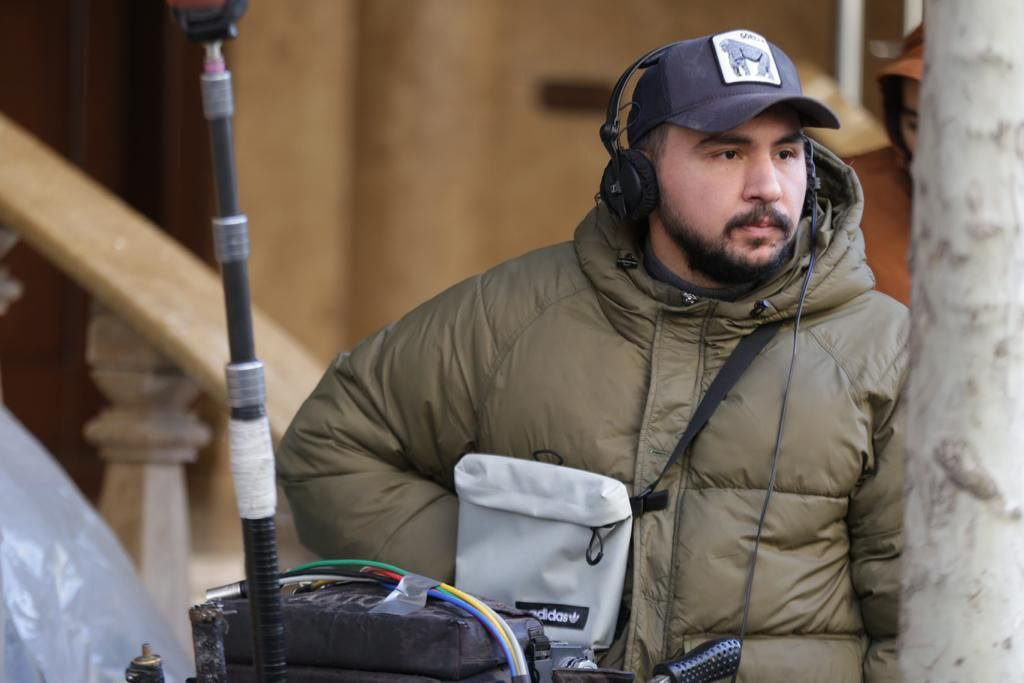
- Born: November 10, 1992 (age 33)

Hamid Yousefi (born November 10, 1992) is an Iranian film director, screenwriter, researcher, and producer.

== Early life ==
Yousefi was born on November 10, 1992.

== Career ==
Yousefi began his filmmaking career at the age of 15 while attending the School of Broadcasting in Iran. He continued his studies in screenplay writing under the supervision of Bahram Beyzai at the age of 17. He holds a master's degree in Dramatic Literature from Tarbiat Modares University in Tehran.

In 2019, he was recognized as a promising talent at the Fajr International Film Festival.

In the Cinema Topography volumes 1 and 2, a collection of cinema articles, Yousefi has published two articles. His works mainly focus on women, cultural frameworks, and identity.

== Works ==
=== Cinema: The Unknown Exhibition and Our Story (2015) ===
His first professional work, "Cinema: The Unknown Exhibition and Our Story" (2015), was screened in the Art and Experience Cinema in 2019. The film consists of five episodes portraying the mental narratives of the audience about a Qajar painting. Yousefi reconstructed the Qajar era in this film, successfully reconstructing the era through set design and construction. The film includes a collage of Ali Hatami's films, which was a new postmodern move in Iranian short cinema at the time, leading to the use of this technique in some Iranian films afterward.

- In the semi-final section of the Sydney Indie Festival in Australia, the short film "Cinema: The Unknown Exhibition and Our Story" (2015) won the Best Film and Best Cinematography awards and was nominated for Best Sound.
- It was also nominated for Best Cinematography at the Fajr International Film Festival.

=== Hearing Aid (2018) ===
His next film, "Hearing Aid," was made in 2018 with Majid Barzegar as the producer. This film addresses a social issue and stars Panteha Apanah and Behzad Dorani. It has participated in several international festivals.

The film "Hearing Aid" was distributed by the German company Ag and Ar and produced by Majid Barzegar. It participated in various festivals:

- 73rd Montecatini International Short Film Festival, Montecatini, Italy (October 30, 2023)
- 21st Riverside, California, United States (March 22, 2023)
- 13th Arlington International Film Festival, Massachusetts, United States (October 20, 2023)
- 23rd The Unprecedented Cinema, Tallinn, United States (September 20, 2023)
- 6th Independent Trame Festival, Pisa, Italy (June 15, 2023
- 3rd Falvaterra Film Festival, Falvaterra, Italy (June 20, 2023) - Award Winner
- 8th UnDependence, Hamburg, Germany (March 21, 2023)
- 6th Taobao, Tbilisi, Georgia (September 27, 2023)
- 3rd Arkgaet, Toronto, Canada (June 28, 2023)
- 10th Dia Open Air, Tirana, Albania (October 20, 2023)
- 16th Annual World Music and Independent Film Festival (WMIFF), Herndon, Virginia, United States (November 12, 2023)
- 5th Skiptown Playhouse, USA (2023) 2nd Cape Town Squad, South Africa (2023) 8th FECEA, Brazil (2023)
- 77th Salerno, Italy
- It won the Best Director award at the sixteenth Goddess on the Throne Festival in Kosovo
- the Best Director award at the International Film Festivalrica
- the Best Trailer award at the third Followtra in Italy
- It was also nominated in the categories of acting, screenplay, directing, Best Film, cinematography, music, and editing at the Cape Town Squad in South Africa
- It was nominated for Best Foreign Language Film and Best Drama Film at Skiptown Playhouse in the USA
- It was also nominated for Best Screenplay and Cinematography at the 16th Annual World Music and Independent Film Festival (WMIFF) in Herndon, Virginia, United States.
- It was also nominated for Best Film at the 40th Asolo Art Festival in Asolo, Italy.(July 20, 2023)
- 2nd quarter Edition of our Queen Palm International Film Festival, USA, 2020, Nominee for Best Voice
- 2nd quarter Edition of our Queen Palm International Film Festival, USA, 2020, WON AWARD, Best Picture and Best Director

=== Sphinx (Abulhool) (2022) ===
In 2022, he directed the film "Abulhool," a free adaptation of Sophocles' "Oedipus Rex." This literary work was also the subject of his undergraduate thesis, co-written with Romina Roshanbin, a cinema critic.

This short film has been present in over twenty international festivals and has won the Best Director award at the sixteenth Goddess of the Throne Festival in Kozo, the second Cape Town Film Festival in South Africa, and the Best Trailer award at the third Falloutra Festival in Italy.

- 40TH ASOLO Art Film Festival, Italy July 20, 2023, Nominee for best film
- 2nd Cape Town Squad International Film Festival, South Africa, 2023, Nominee for the categories of acting, screenplay, director, best film, cinematography, music, editing
- 5th SKIPTOWN PLAYHOUSE Film Festival, USA, 2023, Nominee for the best foreign language film and the best drama film
- 16th Annual World Music and Independent Film Festival (WMIFF), usa, 2023, Nominee for the best screenplay and cinematography
- 3rd Falvaterra Film Festival, Italy June 20, 2023 WON AWARD, The best movie trailer
- 2nd Cape Town Squad International Film Festival, South Africa, 2023, WON AWARD, best director
- 16th Goddess on the Throne-Hyjnesha ne fron, Kosovo, 2023, WON AWARD, best director
