= Hamid Reza Rasekh =

Iranian pharmacologist and professor

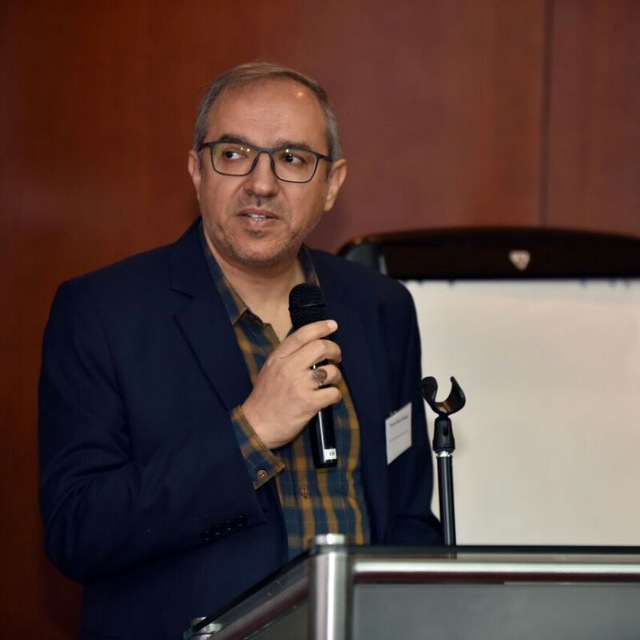
- Born: 1962 (age 63–64); Kerman
- Education: Florida A&M University (PhD); Northeast Louisiana University (BS)
- Awards: Research Achievement Scholarship (3M Company), Research Achievement Award (Florida A&M University)
- Scientific career
- Fields: Toxicology
- Institutions: Shaheed Beheshti University of Medical Sciences
- Thesis: Neurochemical alteration associated with Selenium Toxicity (1995)
- Doctoral advisor: Karam Soliman

Hamid Reza Rasekh (born 1962) is an Iranian pharmacologist and toxicologist and Professor of Pharmacoeconomics and Pharmaceutical Management at Shaheed Beheshti University of Medical Sciences.
