= Hamed Ameli =

Iranian conservative politician and governor of Ardabil Province

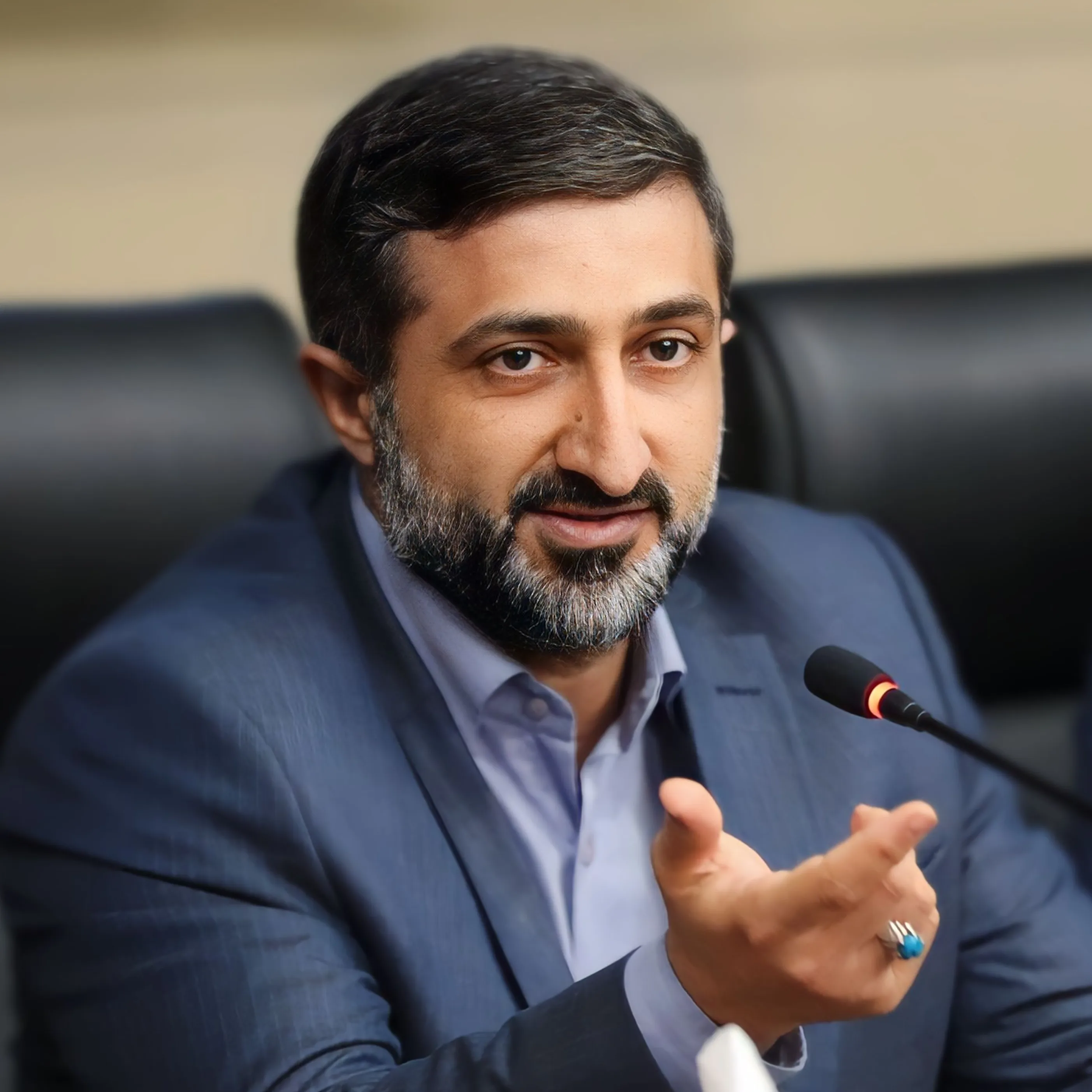

Governor-general of Ardabil
- In office 26 September 2021 – 17 November 2024
- President: Ebrahim Raisi
- Preceded by: Akbar Behnamjoo
- Succeeded by: Masoud Emami Yeganeh

Personal details
- Born: 1977 (age 48–49) Ardabil, Iran
- Party: Principlist
- Education: Islamic Azad University

Hamed Ameli (Persian: سید حامد عاملی, born 1977) is an Iranian conservative politician who formerly served as the governor general of Ardabil Province.

== Education ==
Ameli holds a bachelor's degree in industrial engineering and received a PhD in social communication sciences .
