= Hamid Dawai =

Hamid Dawai is an Emir of the Arab Awlad Rashed Tribe, and is a member of the Janjaweed militia in the far Western region of Darfur along the border with Chad. He is linked to the civilian deaths of 460 people and has been described as a war criminal for government crimes in the Darfur conflict, which are claimed to involve genocide, rape, and torture. Dawai's brother; Hasballa Dawai, was killed when he was stabbed in the neck with a spear by an African villager when forces under Dawai's command attacked a village in July 2002. Because of his role in the Darfur conflict, Dawai has become well known amongst Masalit refugees.

== Role in the Darfur Conflict ==
=== Cooperation with the Sudanese Government ===
Dawai is alleged to have a close working relationship with the Sudanese Government. In July 2003 Dawai is alleged to have met with Musa Hilal, a major Janjaweed leader, and then left the meeting in a helicopter with Ahmed Haroun, the Darfur Security Desk Minister. From Harun's helicopter, Dawai was able to give the government minister an birds-eye-view of the destruction Dawai's forces had caused. Dawai's forces were responsible for the destruction of numerous villages and had turned the area of West Darfur near the Chad border into a no-man's land.

Dawai also received weapons, vehicles, and communications equipment from the Sudanese government. Two Lieutenants, one from the Sudanese National Police and one from the Sudanese Army, were brought in to help advise and coordinate Dawai's forces. Dawai's forces have then gone on to carry out attacks in conjunction with Sudanese Government forces.

=== Racism ===
The attacks orchestrated by forces under Dawai's control are alleged to have a strong racial element, with the Janjaweed attempting to exterminate Black Africa tribes. Janjaweed under Dawai's command are alleged to have shouted "Kill the Nuba" and chanted “Nuba, Nuba, out, out!” Nuba is a term used by Arabs meaning black slaves.
