= Hamidu Baba Braimah =

Ghanaian politician

Member of Parliament for Salaga Constituency
- In office 7 January 1992 – 6 January 199
- President: John Jerry Rawlings

Member of Parliament for Salaga Constituency
- In office 7 January 1997 – 6 January 2000
- President: John Jerry Rawlings

Personal details
- Born: 6 August 1953 Salaga, Northern Region, Ghana
- Died: 27 August 2009 (aged 56)
- Party: National Democratic Congress
- Education: Kumasi Polytechnic, Ghana College, Tamale
- Occupation: Politician
- Profession: Accountant

Hamidu Baba Braimah (6 August 1953 – 27 August 2009) was a Ghanaian politician and a member of the First and Second Parliaments of the Fourth Republic representing the Salaga Constituency in the Northern Region of Ghana.

== Early life and education ==
Baba was born on 6 August 1953 at Salaga in the Northern Region of Ghana. He attended the Kumasi Polytechnic College and obtained his Diploma GCE Ordinary Level in Accounting. He attended the Ghana College, Tamale (now Ghana Senior High School) and obtained his Diploma in Business Studies.

== Politics ==
Baba was first elected into Parliament on the ticket of the National Democratic Congress for the Salaga Constituency in the Northern Region of Ghana during the 1992 Ghanaian General Elections.

He was re-elected into the second parliament of the fourth republic. He polled 14,091 votes out of the 26,171 valid votes cast representing 37.60% over his opponents Maha Rapheal Suleman who polled 11,572 votes and Abdlia Issah who polled 508 votes. He was defeated in 2000 by Boniface Abibakar Saddiqui who polled 9,620 votes representing 40.10% against Baba who polled 7,799 votes representing 32.50%.

== Career ==
Aside being a politician, Baba was an accountant.

== Personal life ==
Baba was a Muslim. He was married and had 5 children.
