= Sehra (poetry) =

Poem sung at a nikah (Muslim wedding) in praise of the groom

Sehra (سہرا) or prothalamion is a poem sung at a nikah (Muslim wedding) in praise of the groom, praying to God for his future wedded life. Sehra is not the subject matter of folk songs alone, some of the prominent Urdu poets like Mirza Ghalib, Zauq and even Bahadur Shah Zafar too have composed sehras.

== Tradition ==
In South Asian Muslim traditions, especially in Uttar Pradesh and Hyderabad (Deccan), there is a social ritual where the sisters of the groom sing sehra, a poem in praise of the groom and pray to God for his future wedded life. The groom follows this by giving cash to his sisters. Also, sehras are generally written by individuals praising their brothers, so they are very varied in style and nature.

== Literature ==
Sehra is a type of nazm and a genre of Urdu poetry, though there are no specifications for a sehra except that it should rhyme and be of the same meter.

== Popular culture ==
A good sehra appears in the Urdu film, Razia Sultana; however, this particular sehra was sung by males, quite contrary to the current tradition.
