= Hamid Garmabi =

Iranian engineer and reformist politician

Member of the Parliament of Iran
- In office 28 May 2016 – 26 May 2020
- Constituency: Nishapur and Firuzeh
- Majority: 75,686

Personal details
- Born: Hamid Garmabi; 1961 (age 64–65) Nishapur, Iran
- Party: List of Hope
- Spouse: Bayan
- Profession: Chemical Engineer; University professor
- Website: http://www.hamidgarmabi.ir

Hamid Garmabi (Persian: حمید گرمابی, born 1961) is an Iranian engineer and reformist politician who was a member of the Parliament of Iran representing Nishapur. He was chancellor of Amir Kabir University's Faculty of Engineering Polymer and Color before being elected as a parliament member.
