= Hamid Sultan bin Abu Backer =

Retired Malaysian Court of Appeal Judge

- حامد سلطان بن أبو بكر

Judge of the Court of Appeal of Malaysia
- In office 8 January 2013 – 27 August 2021

High Court Judge, Kuala Lumpur
- In office October 2008 – 7 January 2013

Personal details
- Born: 28 August 1955 (age 70) Malaysia
- Education: University of London (LLM); PhD in Civil Procedure and Justice; Bachelor's degree in Economics
- Occupation: Judge (retired); Legal academic; Author
- Known for: Janab Law Series, Judicial whistleblowing, Dissenting judgments
- Awards: Fellow, Chartered Institute of Arbitrators

Hamid Sultan bin Abu Backer; born 28 August 1955) is a retired Malaysian judge, legal academic, and author. He served as a Judge of the Court of Appeal of Malaysia from 2013 to 2021. He gained prominence for his extensive legal publications, significant dissenting judgments in constitutional cases, and for publicly alleging judicial misconduct in high-profile cases through a 2019 affidavit, which led to his suspension in 2021.

== Early life and education ==
Hamid Sultan obtained a Bachelor's degree in Economics and a Master of Laws degree with Honours in Insurance, Shipping and Syariah Law from the University of London. He later earned a Doctor of Philosophy (PhD) in Civil Procedure and Justice. He was called to the Bar as a Barrister-at-Law and is a Fellow of the Chartered Institute of Arbitrators (London).

== Judicial career ==
=== High Court appointments ===
Hamid Sultan's judicial career began with his appointment as a Judicial Commissioner of the High Court of Malaya in Kuching and Sibu, Sarawak, serving from March 2007 to April 2009. He then served as Judicial Commissioner of the High Court in Kuala Lumpur from May 2009 to September 2009, before being elevated to High Court Judge in Kuala Lumpur in October 2008, a position he held until 7 January 2013.

=== Court of Appeal ===
On 8 January 2013, Hamid Sultan was elevated to the Court of Appeal of Malaysia, where he served until his mandatory retirement on 27 August 2021. During his tenure, he authored over one thousand judgments covering various areas of Malaysian law.

==== Notable dissenting judgments ====
===== M. Indira Gandhi unilateral conversion case (2015) =====
In 2015, Justice Hamid Sultan sat on a three-judge Court of Appeal panel hearing the case of M. Indira Gandhi, a Hindu mother challenging the unilateral conversion of her children to Islam by her ex-husband. The majority ruled 2-1 that civil courts lacked jurisdiction over the conversion, placing it within the sole purview of Syariah courts.

Justice Hamid Sultan delivered a significant dissent, arguing that the civil High Court had jurisdiction to question the legality of the conversion. He also proposed that the Chief Justice could establish a "hybrid court" within the civil court system to resolve interfaith disputes, though this suggestion was later dismissed by the then-Chief Justice as a policy matter for the executive branch.

His dissenting position was subsequently vindicated when a five-member Federal Court of Malaysia bench unanimously upheld his reasoning in early 2018, ruling that the consent of both spouses was required to convert a minor to Islam.

In August 2018, Justice Hamid Sultan publicly revealed that he had been "severely reprimanded" by a senior judge for his dissenting judgment in the Indira Gandhi case. He stated that following this incident, he was no longer empanelled to hear cases related to the Federal Constitution or public interest matters.

===== ISA 7 case (2013) =====
Justice Hamid Sultan also delivered a dissenting judgment in a 2013 case involving individuals convicted for participating in an illegal assembly protesting the Internal Security Act (ISA), known as the "ISA 7" case. While the majority upheld their conviction, Justice Hamid Sultan argued in his dissent that Section 27 of the Police Act, which criminalised assembly without a police permit, was unconstitutional. This case was later highlighted in his 2019 affidavit as an example of alleged judicial interference.

== Academic career ==
Hamid Sultan has held numerous academic appointments at Malaysian and international institutions. As of 2025, he serves as:

- Professor for Arbitration and Dispute Resolution, MAHSA University
- Honorary Professor, Maharashtra National Law University, Aurangabad, India
- Honorary Fellow, Middle East Institute (MEI), National University of Singapore
- Honorary Visiting Professor, Damodaram Sanjivayya National Law University (DSNLU), Visakhapatnam, India

He previously served as Adjunct Professor at the International Islamic University Malaysia (IIUM) and Multimedia University (MMU), and as Panel Advisor at the Islamic Science University of Malaysia (USIM).

== Publications ==
Hamid Sultan is the author of the Janab Law Series, a comprehensive collection of legal textbooks widely used in Malaysian legal education and practice. His published works include:

- Janab's Key to Company Law (with commentary on Companies Act 2016 and Limited Liability Partnership Act 2012)
- Janab's Key to Construction Law, Adjudication, Mediation, Domestic and International Arbitration (with commentary on CIPPA 2012 and Arbitration Act 2005)
- Textbooks on Constitutional Law, Judicial Review, Civil Procedure, Criminal Procedure, Evidence, Conveyancing, Islamic Banking, and Legal Remedies

The Speaker of the Dewan Rakyat, Datuk Mohamad Ariff Md Yusoff, accepted a collection of Hamid Sultan's books for Parliament's library, noting the importance of local authors contributing academic works to support legislative research.

== Judicial whistleblowing and controversy ==
=== 2018 public disclosure ===
In August 2018, at the International Malaysia Law Conference, Hamid Sultan publicly disclosed concerns about alleged judicial interference and misconduct in the Malaysian judiciary, including the reprimand he received for his dissenting judgment in the Indira Gandhi case. He stated that it was his public duty under his constitutional oath of office to expose such conduct in the best interest of the judiciary.

=== 2019 affidavit ===
On 14 February 2019, Hamid Sultan filed a 63-page affidavit in support of a civil suit filed by lawyer Sangeet Kaur Deo, daughter of the late opposition leader Karpal Singh, against the then Chief Justice of the Federal Court of Malaysia. The lawsuit sought to declare that the Chief Justice had failed to defend the integrity of the judiciary regarding alleged interference in Karpal Singh's sedition appeal and the M. Indira Gandhi case.

==== Key allegations ====
In the affidavit, Hamid Sultan alleged:

- A scheme involving some members of the judiciary working with private parties to defraud the government through contracts created by political nominees, where the government would subsequently breach the contract, allowing private parties to sue for compensation
- The existence of a senior judge, referred to as "ARLC" (Antagonist of Rule of Law and Constitution), who acted tyrannically and interfered in other judges' decisions, blocking career progression and promotions of judges who made decisions contrary to his instructions
- Judicial interference in the criminal appeal of opposition leader Anwar Ibrahim's sodomy case, claiming that judges initially voted for acquittal but changed their decision after being contacted by a senior judge
- Judicial interference in the sedition appeal of Karpal Singh
- Concerns expressed by senior judges about facing removal or tribunal proceedings if there was a change of government

Hamid Sultan called for the establishment of a Royal Commission of Inquiry (RCI) to investigate these allegations.

==== Public response and RCI developments ====
The affidavit prompted immediate and widespread calls for an RCI from the Malaysian Bar, political leaders, and civil society groups. The Malaysian Bar president at the time, George Varughese, supported the call for an RCI.

On 18 February 2019, the Malaysian Anti-Corruption Commission (MACC) met with Justice Hamid Sultan. However, he declined to provide a statement, insisting he would only give details to a special task force for an RCI.

Prime Minister Tun Dr. Mahathir Mohamad confirmed on 21 February 2019 that an RCI would be formed. In February 2019, a Parliamentary Caucus on Reform and Governance, chaired by Datuk Seri Anwar Ibrahim, agreed to recommend the RCI's formation to the Cabinet.

However, the RCI's formation was delayed. In June 2019, the government stated the RCI could not be convened because it was facing a legal challenge from former Sabah Chief Minister Datuk Seri Yong Teck Lee, who had filed a suit challenging the RCI's constitutionality. The commission was never formally established, particularly after the change in government in early 2020.

=== Suspension by Judges' Ethics Committee ===
In 2020, the Judges' Ethics Committee (JEC) began inquiry proceedings against Justice Hamid Sultan based on two complaints: his judgment in the case Public Prosecutor v. Aluma Mark Chinonso & Anor and his 2019 affidavit.

Justice Hamid Sultan filed a judicial review to challenge the JEC's decision to hold the inquiry in private, arguing that a closed-door proceeding violated judicial independence and the Federal Constitution. The High Court of Malaya dismissed his application.

On 5 February 2021, the JEC, chaired by Chief Justice Tun Tengku Maimun Tuan Mat, found that the complaints against him "have been proven." The committee suspended Justice Hamid Sultan from office from 4 February 2021 until 27 August 2021, making him the first judge to be punished under the Judges' Ethics Committee Act 2010. The suspension covered the remaining tenure of his judicial service until his mandatory retirement.

The Malaysian Bar Council called for the JEC to review its decision, arguing that the allegations should have been investigated by an independent oversight body, such as the proposed RCI, rather than by the JEC. Several civil society organizations, including the Human Rights Commission of Malaysia (SUHAKAM) and Suara Rakyat Malaysia (SUARAM), echoed this position.

=== Retirement ===
Hamid Sultan reached the mandatory retirement age of 66 on 27 August 2021. In a statement on his retirement day, he affirmed: "I stood up to my oath of office, notwithstanding many challenges I had to endure."

== Post-retirement career ==
After retirement, Hamid Sultan continues his work in legal education and alternative dispute resolution. He is associated with Affordable Arbitration and ADR Chambers LLP and maintains his academic appointments at various universities. He has spoken at international conferences, including presentations on arbitration clauses in Islamic finance facilities at Hamad Bin Khalifa University in Doha, Qatar.

== Contributions to legal reform ==
Hamid Sultan developed the concept of University cum Court Annexed Arbitration (UCAA), a scheme proposing that courts offer arbitration as an alternative dispute resolution mechanism to litigants. The concept has been described as innovative and, if implemented, would make Malaysia among the first countries to pioneer such a scheme.
