= Hamid Nagra =

Pakistani cricketer (born 1943)

Personal information
- Full name: Hamid Mansoor Nagra
- Born: 8 March 1943 (age 83); Lyallpur (now Faisalabad), Punjab, British India
- Batting: Right-handed
- Bowling: Right-arm medium
- Role: Wicket-keeper-batter
- Relatives: Khalid Nagra (brother)

Domestic team information
- Years: Team
- 1968/69: National Tyre and Rubber Company
- 1967/68: Central Zone
- 1966/67: North Zone
- 1966/67: Punjab Governor's XI
- 1966/67–1967/68: Sargodha, Multan and Bahawalpur
- 1965/66: Punjab University, Lahore
- 1961/62–1978/79: Sargodha

Career statistics
Competition	First-class
Matches	24
Runs scored	1,000
Batting average	27.77
100s/50s	2/6
Top score	122*
Balls bowled	–
Wickets	–
Bowling average	–
5 wickets in innings	–
10 wickets in match	–
Best bowling	–
Catches/stumpings	27/5
- Source: CricketArchive, 1 May 2026

Hamid Nagra (born 8 March 1943) is a Pakistani former cricketer. Nagra was a right-handed batsman who also kept wicket. He was born in the village of Lahorian Wala, Chak Jhumra, near Lyallpur (now Faisalabad), Punjab, in British India.

Nagra was educated at Government Technical High School, Peoples Colony, and first came to prominence in school cricket before joining Lyallpur Gymkhana as a wicket-keeper. He made his first-class debut for Sargodha in the 1961–62 Quaid-e-Azam Trophy. His maiden first-class fifty was 54 against Combined Services at Pindi Club Ground in the 1962–63 Quaid-e-Azam Trophy. In the following season, he made his highest first-class score, carrying his bat for 122 not out against Railways at Bohranwala Ground in the 1963–64 Quaid-e-Azam Trophy.

By the 1964–65 season, Nagra had become captain of Sargodha. One of the highlights of his career came for the combined Sargodha, Multan and Bahawalpur side against Rawalpindi and Peshawar in the 1966–67 Quaid-e-Azam Trophy, when he top-scored in both innings with 50 and 65 as an opening batsman. In the same season, playing for Punjab Governor's XI against the touring Ceylonese side at Lyallpur Stadium, he made 35 in an opening stand of 68 with Aftab Gul.

Disappointed after being replaced by Wasim Raja for Sargodha's quarter-final campaign in the 1969–70 Quaid-e-Azam Trophy, Nagra withdrew from the side and effectively left first-class cricket for several years. He returned in the 1978–79 BCCP Patron's Trophy, captaining Sargodha against Lahore Municipal Corporation at Iqbal Stadium, Faisalabad, and scored 97 in the first innings and 108 in the second, sharing century opening partnerships in both innings with Mushtaq Ahmed.

Overall, Nagra is credited with 24 first-class matches in which he scored 1,000 runs at a batting average of 27.77, making 2 centuries and 6 half-centuries. As a wicket-keeper, he took 27 catches and completed 5 stumpings. In the 1969–70 Quaid-e-Azam Trophy, he made 5 wicket-keeping dismissals in a match against Lahore A.
