= Hamed al-Nazir =

Sudanese journalist and novelist (1975-)

Hamed al-Nazir (Arabic: حامد الناظر; born 1975), also spelled Hamid el-Nazir, is a Sudanese journalist and novelist.

al-Nazir graduated from Omdurman Ahlia University with a bachelor's degree in Business Management. He has since worked as a broadcaster for the Sudanese Al-Shorouk channel, a news reporter for the MBC channel from Sudan, and a commentator for the Sudanese Blue Nile Channel and Sudanese Radio. He currently works for Alaraby TV as News Presenter. He was working for Qatar TV.

al-Nazir has published four acclaimed novels in Arabic. Several of his novels have been longlisted for the International Prize for Arabic Fiction. An excerpt in English translation of his novel The Waterman's Prophecy was included in Banipal magazine's spring issue on Sudanese Literature Today in 2016.

== Selected works ==
- "Freej Al Marar" (Arabic: فريج المرر) 2014, which won the 2014 Sharjah Prize for Arab Creativity, and the 2014 Qatar Vodafone Prize for the Novel.
- The Waterman's Prophecy (Arabic: نبوءة السقّا) 2015, which was longlisted for the International Prize for Arabic Fiction in 2016.
- The Black Peacock (Arabic: الطاووس الأسود) 2017, which is also longlisted for the International Prize for Arabic Fiction in 2018.
- Green Eyes (Arabic: عينان خضراوان) 2020, based on Mariam Ibrahim story and was longlisted for the International Prize for Arabic Fiction 2021.

== See also ==
- Sudanese literature
- List of Sudanese writers
- The Waterman's Prophecy
- International Prize for Arabic Fiction
