= Hamid Arabnia =

American computer scientist

Hamid Reza Arabnia is a professor of computer science at the University of Georgia. He has been the editor-in-chief of The Journal of Supercomputing since 1997.
