= Hamid Said =

Iraqi writer and poet

- حميد سعيد هادي
- Born: 1941 (age 84–85); Iraq, Hillah
- Education: certified in Arabic Language and Literature
- Alma mater: Baghdad University
- Title: Writer, Poet, Journalist

Hamid Said (1941), (Arabic: حميد سعيد) is an Iraqi poet and writer. He was born in Hillah. He is certified in Arabic Language and Literature from the University of Baghdad. He worked in teaching for a while, then he moved to journalism. He worked in a number of Arab and European cities. He was elected as the President of the Writers Union in Iraq and Secretary-General of the Arab Writers Union for two consecutive terms. He has lived in Jordan since 2003. He has published several poetry collections since 1968, including: “Beaches don't know the warmth” (original text: shawati lm tueraf aldaf'), “The language of clay constellations” (original text: lughat al'abraj altynyh), “The eighth reading” (original text: qira'a thamina), “The gypsy songs” (original text: al'aghani alghjry), “The Audience fire" (original text: harayiq alhu'dur), “Abdullah's garden” (original text: bustan abd allah), “Towards a wider horizon” (original text: biaitijah 'ufuq 'awsae), “Chaos in other than its place” (original text: fawdaa fi ghyr eunwaniha), “The childhood of water” (original text: tufulat alma'), and “Those are my companions” (original text: 'uwlayik 'ashabii).

== Biography ==
Hamid Said was born in 1941 in Al-Wardiyah, Hilla. He graduated from Arabic Language Department, University of Baghdad, 1968. He worked in the field of education for a period of time, then he moved in the late sixties to the field of cultural and journalistic. He occupied a number of employments in cultural and journalistic centers, including the Director of Publishing and Press Adviser in the Iraqi Embassy in Madrid 1972-1975 and Rabat 1975–1977.

Then he was appointed as chairman of the Board of Directors of Dar Al-Thawra for the press and editor-in-chief of Al-Thawra newspaper 1982–1991. Next he was appointed as cultural advisor in the Office of the Presidency of the Republic 1992–1995. Then he was appointed as Head of the Trustees of the House of Wisdom 2000–2003.

He was also elected Secretary of the General Union of Writers and Writers in Iraq from 1969 to 1972 and then assumed its presidency from 1980 to 1986. In addition, he was appointed as Secretary General of the Union of Arab Writers twice 1984–1988, and Editor-in-Chief of Al-Katib Al-Arabi magazine.

He moved to Amman, Jordan, after the end of the Iraqi Ba’athist Republic, and he is still residing there.

In January 2017, the President of Petra University, Marwan Al-Mulla, honored him while attending the discussion of a master's thesis on his poetic experience, prepared by the Iraqi student Anwar Ibrahim Al-Hanoush, entitled “The experience of exile in modern Arabic poetry: Hamid Said is a model” and discussed it at the Petra University.

== Literary career ==
Hamid Said stated that the references of creativity, "are the references of life, not only in poetry, but in all titles of creativity, and that whoever blocks the horizon of creativity, with one reference, or with specific references, will be far from the sense of creativity." He said about his beginning of his journey in poetry, "I can say, I had two beginnings in writing poetry, the first one was by trying to imitate the songs that I was listening to, and this attempt developed during the elementary school years, then middle school, during that time, I wrote verses of poetry and short poems." I was imitating the poets, such as, Mikhail Naima, Elia Abu Madi, Gibran Khalil Gibran, and others”.

He wrote many poetry collections and wrote three short poetry plays, which were published in Arab periodicals.

== Personal life ==
He is married and he has one daughter who was born in 1970 and a son who was born in 1971.

== Honors and awards ==
- The Jerusalem Medal, 1990: From Yasser Arafat at a ceremony at his headquarters in Tunis.
- Medal of the General Union of Arab Authors and Writers, 2004: On the occasion of the fiftieth anniversary of its founding, the Union Medal was awarded, among ten Arab writers.

== Works ==
- “Beaches don't know the warmth” (original text: shawati lm tueraf aldaf'), Diwan, 1968.
- "The language of clay constellations" (original text: lughat al'abraj altynyh), Diwan, 1970
- “The eighth reading” (original text: qira'a thamina), Diwan, 1972.
- “The gypsy songs” (original text: al'aghani alghjry), Diwan, 1975.
- “The Audience fire" (original text: harayiq alhu'dur), Diwan, 1978.
- Hamid Said Diwan, Part 1, 1984.
- “The childhood of water” (original text: tufulat alma'), Diwan, 1985
- "The Kingdom of Abdullah", or “Abdullah's garden” (original text: mamlakat abd Allah or bustan abd Allah), Diwan, 1986.
- “Towards a wider horizon” (original text: biaitijah 'ufuq 'awsae), Diwan, 1991.
- “Chaos in other than its place” (original text: fawdaa fi ghyr eunwaniha), Diwan, 1996
- "Poetic Works", 2 volumes, 2002
- From the flower of Writing to the Ash of the Forest, (original text: min wardat alkitabat 'iilaa ghabat alramad) Diwan, 2005
- "Writing and its implications", 2011
- “Those are my companions” (original text: 'uwlayik 'ashabii), Diwan, 2015
- "Revealing the secrets of the poem", (original text: alkashf ean 'asrar alqasida) 1988
- "Place in a Terrain of Memory", (original text: almakan fi tadaris aldhaakirat) 1994
- "War Papers", (original text:'awraq alharb) 1989
- "No Memories", (original text: dhakirat laa) 1992
- "Twenty Messages and Messages" (original text: eshrwn risala warisala) ... in collobration with Sami Mahdi, 1998
- "Thought and Politics" (original text: alfikr walsiyasa)
- "Politics and Heritage", (original text: alsiyasa walturath) The Small Encyclopedia, 1985
- "Democracy and Independence", (original text: aldiymuqratia wal'ustiqlalia) 1996
- "The Great Debate": (original text: almunazilat alkubraa) Introductions and Results, by Participation, 1998
