= Hamid Tafazoli =

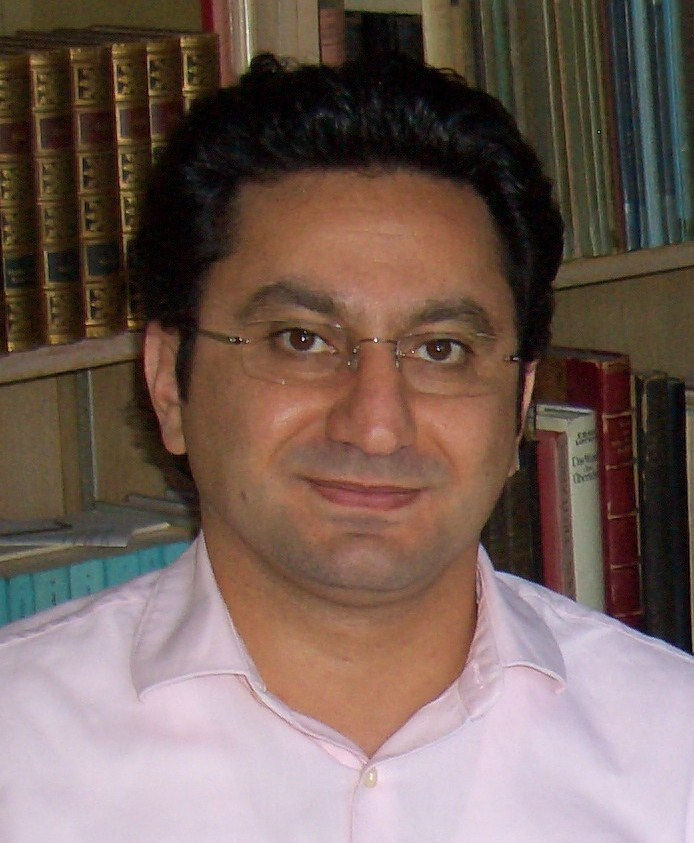

Hamid Tafazoli (born 1968 in Isfahan, Imperial State of Iran) is a German literary scholar. His research and teaching focus on literary and media studies in the context of cultural theory within German studies, and he teaches modern German literature at the Faculty of Linguistics and Literary Studies at Bielefeld University.

== Life ==
Hamid Tafazoli studied German philology, general linguistics, and Indo-European linguistics at the Westfälischen Wilhelms-Universität Münster and completed his studies in 2000 with a Magister Artium. As a Goethe-Institut scholarship holder, he received a qualification from the Goethe-Institut in 2003 and the Universität Kassel in the field of "German as a Foreign Language in Theory and Practice," and taught "German as a Foreign Language" at the Westfälische Wilhelms-Universität Münster from 2000 to 2008.

In 2006, Tafazoli received his doctorate in German philology, general linguistics, and Indo-European linguistics at Westfälische Wilhelms-Universität Münster, where he also taught from 2006 to 2008. Tafazoli's dissertation, titled "The German Discourse on Persia," received the Sybille Hahne Prize of Westfälische Wilhelms-Universität Münster in 2006 for the humanities.

From 2009, Tafazoli was a Feodor Lynen Fellow of the Alexander von Humboldt Foundation at the Department of Germanics at the University of Washington in Seattle, and in 2011 he joined the Faculty of Linguistics and Literary Studies at Bielefeld University, where he completed his habilitation in 2017. From 2013 to 2015, Tafazoli was a senior researcher at the Institute for German Language, Literature and Intercultural Studies at the University of Luxembourg. His research project, "Yesterday Migrants – Today Citizens: Critical Reflections on the Status of Migration Literature from an Intercultural Perspective," was funded by the Luxembourg National Research Fund and won a Marie Curie Fellowship Award from the European Commission.

== Research and teaching ==
In his research and teaching, Tafazoli has specialized in German-language literature from the early modern period to Romanticism, German Realism, and Modernism. The focus is on questions of cultural representation in aesthetic forms. Tafazoli has been particularly concerned with cultural representations and processes of exchange between Persia and Germany. In addition to his work in Germany, Tafazoli also taught seminars in modern German literary studies at universities in the United States, Spain, and Italy, including the University of Washington in Seattle, the University of Santiago de Compostela, and the Università degli Studi di Bergamo.

His works analyze, among other things, how German, Italian, French, and Persian literatures portray and reflect cultural encounters, differences, and similarities. With his dissertation, "The German Discourse on Persia" (2007), he presented the first comprehensive and foundational study of the forms of cultural representation of the image of Persia in German literature; he later deepened this topic with the edited volume "Persia in the Mirror of Germany" (2018).

Tafazoli's work is situated within models of cultural description based on cultural semiotics, narratology, and media theory. It argues for differentiating between aesthetic forms of cultural memory and understanding their semantics in plurilingual and pluricultural terms. It emphasizes that German studies research on interculturality makes not only differences visible in its subject matter, but also overlaps and similarities.

Beyond literary and literary-theoretical questions, Tafazoli is also interested in the aesthetic elaboration of identity-forming narratives such as "home," "language," and "Europe" in his habilitation thesis, Narrative Cultural Transformations: On Intercultural Modes of Writing in Contemporary German-Language Literature (2019). In interviews, Tafazoli also seeks public discourse. He is the director and CEO of Profesolutions, the Institute for Language, Communication, Rhetoric and Aesthetics.

== Academic work ==
With Discourse on Persia, Tafazoli opens and establishes the discursive engagement with Persia in European, especially German, literary and intellectual history. The term covers the literary, scholarly, and cultural processing, appropriation, and representation of Persia from the early modern period to the 19th century. Tafazoli's study fills a research gap and is considered a foundational work that comprehensively documents and analyzes the development and significance of the image of Persia in German literature.

There is still academic interest in the questions that arise from cultural encounters and from the aesthetic forms of those encounters. However, the theoretical premises and methodologies have changed over the last few decades. Whereas Edward Said's central thesis in Orientalism was that the cultures of Europe understood and represented the Orient as part of a rigid, hierarchical dualism of Self and Other, contemporary discourses and texts focus on the spaces of encounter between East and West as constructions with ambivalent, and therefore highly meaningful, implications. Hamid Tafazoli's work makes a significant contribution to these developments. His studies do not speak only of irreconcilable cultural differences, but also of processes of cultural overlap, hybridization, bilateral cultural exchange, and the construction of cultural similarities.

Tafazoli's research on Intercultural Studies further address the problematic category of migration literature as well as questions of cultural identity in their aesthetic forms. In inter-cultural modes of writing, Tafazoli examines motifs that relate differences and similarities to one another in cultural encounter and give them literary shape.

Starting from this literary shaping, he describes strategies of homogenization and reduction on the side of reception and sees these realized in the concept of migration literature. Against this background, his critical engagement with concepts such as nation or home gives his work a contemporary relevance; of theoretical interest is his proposal not only to differentiate concepts of identity within cultural memory, but also to pluralize the semantics of the national with regard to plurilingual and pluricultural histories of origin.

== Monographs and edited volumes ==
- Hamid Tafazoli: Der deutsche Persien-Diskurs. Zur Verwissenschaftlichung und Literarisierung des Persien-Bildes im deutschen Schrifttum von der frühen Neuzeit bis in das neunzehnte Jahrhundert, Aisthesis, Bielefeld 2007, ISBN 978-3-89528-600-1 Dissertation, Universität Münster, Germanistisches Institut, 2006, 612 P.
- Hamid Tafazoli, Richard T. Gray: Außenraum-Mitraum-Innenraum. Heterotopien in Kultur und Gesellschaft, Aisthesis, Bielefeld 2012, 194 P. ISBN 978-3-89528-891-3.
- Hamid Tafazoli, Christine Maillard: Persien im Spiegel Deutschlands. Konstruktionsvarianten der Persienbilder in der deutschsprachigen Literatur vom 18. bis in das 20. Jahrhundert, Presses universitaires de Strasbourg, Strasbourg, 2018, 347 P. ISBN 978-2-86820-956-6.
- Hamid Tafazoli: Narrative kultureller Transformationen. Zu interkulturellen Schreibweisen in der deutschsprachigen Literatur der Gegenwart, transcript, Bielefeld 2019, 532 P. ISBN 978-3-8376-4346-6 (Habilitationsschrift, Universität Bielefeld, Fakultät für Linguistik und Literaturwissenschaft, 2017).
- Hamid Tafazoli, Rolf Stolz: Sprachland Liebesland. SAID: Leben und Werk im Gespräch, Tübingen: Konkursbuch Verlag 2023, 160 P. ISBN 978-3-88769-104-2.
- Hamid Tafazoli: Geteilte Horizonte. Deutschland, Iran und die Sprache der Miträume, Würzburg: Königshausen & Neumann, 2026, 205 P. ISBN 978-3-568-10016-0.

== Honors and awards ==
- 2006 Sybille-Hahne-Preis der Westfälischen Wilhelms-Universität Münster.
- 2009–2011 Feodor Lynen-Forschungsstipendium der Alexander von Humboldt-Stiftung.
- 2015 Marie Curie Fellowship Award der Europäischen Kommission.
