= Hamed Nasrabadian =

Iranian actor and director

حامد نصرآبادیان Hamed Nasrabadian
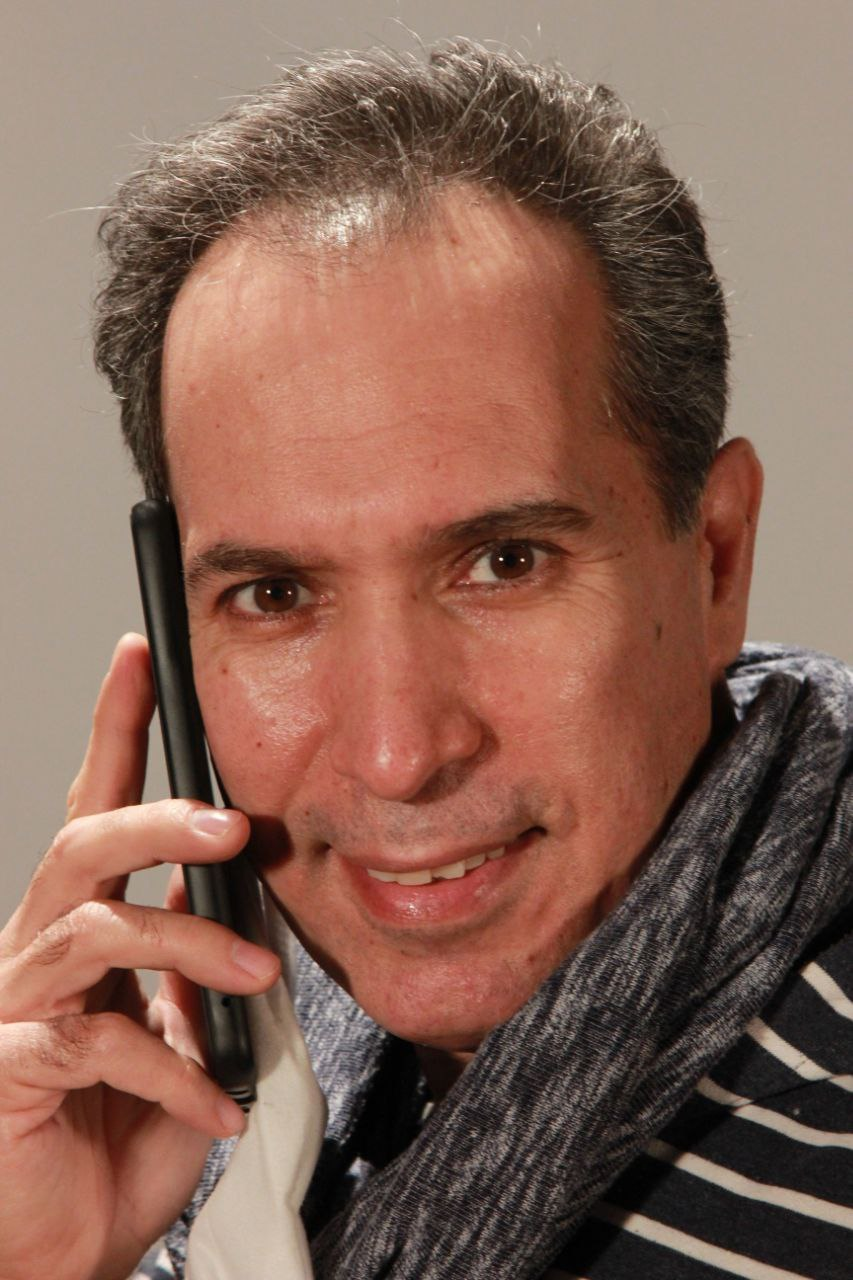
- Born: 29 August 1973 (age 53); Quchan, Iran
- Education: Eurasia International University
- Occupations: Actor, director, playwright, Choreographer and arts instructor
- Years active: 1990 – present

Hamed Nasrabadian (Persian: حامد نصرآبادیان; born 29 August 1973 19) is an Iranian theatre director, stage actor, University Professor, Choreographer and arts instructor.

== Education ==
He graduated from the Eurasia International University.

== The International Body Workshops ==
- Pera Body and Pantomime Workshop- Istanbul 2006
- Pantomime & Ballet workshop in Armenia Academy on Character Dance- Erevan 2008
- Musical Pantomime Academy in Armenia Academy on Character Dance- Yrevan 2009
- Workshop on Iranian Folklore Eurhythmy- LTG Hall- Delhi 2011
- Body Workshop in "Pera" Theatre Academy; Istanbul; Spring 2012

== Career ==
- Managing and responsible specific department 24-hour master classes of theater and cinema
- Designer and teacher of the first, second, and third national theater festival for theater actor
- Designer and teacher of the first Winter Festival of the Deaf Association of Iran, Winter 2014–15
- Teacher of 11th Haft Honar Actress Festival, Art School in Karaj, 2016
- Designer and teacher of the first applied scientific festival "Movement, Expression and Research", Winter 2018-19
- Managing and Responsible of Rocking Chair of Armenia
- Designer and founder of the first Iranian Pantomime School of Deaf
- Director of the Department of the Show of Peace and Friendship Messengers of Iran
- Director of Iran Peace Troops Group
- Arbitrator of the first two-year Pantomime Festival in Tabriz, summer 2007
- Arbitrator of the First Point Theater Festival, Arak University, Winter 2011
- Arbitrator 11th Iranian Theater House Festival, Motion Picture Association, 2017
- Reviewer of the 14th Student Theater Festival, Arak University, Winter 2010
- Reviewer of the Tehran City Theater Festival, Summer 2011
- Reviewer of 15th Student Theater Festival, Tehran University of Technology & Architecture, Winter 2011
- Arbitrator of the First Ceremony of the New Year, Khorram Abad, August 2013
- Arbitrator of the first regional festival of theater scene of Ashura, Isfahan, Nov. Dec. 2013
- Arbitrator of the first regional festival of theater scene of Arts & Thoughts, Isfahan, Nov. Dec. 2014
- Arbitrator of the 8 festival of theater (samar) Feb 2019

== Filmography ==
=== Film ===
- Sometimes is True, Director: Ramin Lebaschi, Product of Iran and Canada (2005)
- Hot Luck, Director: Vahid Darabi (2006)
- The Stranger Bride, Director: Reza Soleimani (2010)
- Nirala, Director: Hamed Bakhshi (2011)
- Plato, Director: Anahita Yarahmadi (2017)

=== Television ===
- Javaneha, Summer 1991, Producer and Director: Reza Kalantari
- Children of Iran, Winter 1994, Producer and Director: Amir Samavati
- Winter, Winter 1996, Producer and Director: Mehdi Shamsaee
- Celebrities, Autumn 1997, Producer and Director: Ali Asghar Ojani, Amir Samavati
- P Like Pantomime, Spring 1998, Producer and Director: Reza Ahmadinia
- Dandelion, Summer 1999, Producer and Director: Amir Samavati

== Prize ==
- The Eurhythmy Choreography Prize from the 15th "Yaran" Festival of India; fall 2010
- First place in the photo section of the second arts and thought festival in Isfahan, Nov. –Dec. 2014
- Sculpture for Physical Exercise Design from the Fifteenth "School of Yarran" Festival in India, Autumn 2011
- Selected poet of Iran's "Shamsa" Poetry Festival, Winter 2011
- Selected Candidate of Photo Section of First Iranian Messenger of Peace and Friendship Festival, winter 2008–2009
- Candidate of Photo Section of First Health Photo & Film Festival, Nishabur, May- June 2015
- "Special Look" Photo Festival Award for Wonderful Beauty Festival, Autumn 2015, Tehran
