= Hamid Reza Ardalan =

Iranian author, composer, academic (born 1959)

- حمیدرضا اردلان
- Born: 23 September 1959; Sanandaj, Iran
- Education: Ph.D
- Occupation(s): Composer, musician, researcher, theorist, professor
- Known for: Research and compilation of theatrical and musical heritage
- Notable work: Tonal Practice
- Style: Transmodernism
- Awards: Jalal Sattari Award

Hamid Reza Ardalan (Persian: حمیدرضا اردلان; born 23 September 1959) is an Iranian theorist, author, composer, theater and performing arts researcher, and professor.

== Biography ==
Ardalan began his artistic career with music and theater learning in 1966. In 1985 he began his professional career in the field of puppet theater and music. He attained a PhD in philosophy and etymology, music and theater. He was the head of the UNIMA branch of Iran, holder of UNIMA's global management chair and chair of the union's Heritage Preservation Committee. Since 2016, he is President of UNIMA International's Heritage Commission, and has performed in puppet theater and theaters worldwide. He has published articles and books, and as artistic director has launched national and international events, festivals and seminars, especially in the field of puppet theater. He is the founder of the Alphabets and Puppet Theater group and the Tehran Experimental Orchestra.

== Books ==
- Picture-Storyteller Masters of Iran
- Proceedings of the Fourth International Seminar on Ritual and Traditional Performances
