= Hamid Fazeli =

Hamid Fazeli (also known as Mohsen Kafi) is the current head of Unit 340 of the Islamic Revolutionary Guard Corps (IRGC) Quds Force and was the fifth president of the Iranian Space Agency (ISA) to have been appointed since its establishment. He also served as the president of the Iranian Space Research Institute (ARI).

== Education and career ==
Fazeli holds a Ph.D. in mechanics from the Sharif University of Technology in Tehran. He was president of the Iran Aerospace Research Institute (ARI) since February 2009 before his appointment as the president of ISA. Recents report show that Fazeli directs the oversight of rocket launches by Harakat Al-Nujaba (HaN), a strategic arm of the Quds Force.

== Sanctions and international scrutiny ==
Due to his contributions to Iran’s missile and space programs, Fazeli has been mentioned in reports on Iran’s military-industrial complex. The U.S. and other Western governments have raised concerns about Iran’s space program being a cover for ballistic missile development, leading to various sanctions on Iranian aerospace officials and institutions. On September 2, 2024, the UK government imposed sanctions on Fazeli for his involvement in supporting armed groups
