= Hamid Ghandehari =

Iranian-American drug delivery research scientist

- Born: Iran
- Education: University of Utah, Ph.D., Pharmaceuticals and Pharmaceutical Chemistry; University of Utah, B.S., Pharmacy
- Scientific career
- Fields: Biomedical Engineering
- Workplaces: University of Utah
- Website: www.ghandeharilab.com

Hamid Ghandehari is an Iranian-American drug delivery research scientist, and a professor in the Departments of Pharmaceutics and Pharmaceutical Chemistry and Biomedical Engineering at the University of Utah. His research is focused in recombinant polymers for drug and gene delivery, nanotoxicology of dendritic and inorganic constructs, water-soluble polymers for targeted delivery and poly(amidoamine) dendrimers for oral delivery.

== Education ==
Ghandehari was born in Iran. He received his B.S degree in pharmacy at the University of Utah in 1989. In 1996, he received his Ph.D. in pharmaceuticals and pharmaceutical chemistry from the University of Utah.

== Career and research ==
=== Early career ===
From 1996 to 1999 Ghandehari was an assistant professor in the Department of Pharmaceutics at University of Mississippi. In 1999 Ghandehari joined the Department of Pharmaceutical Sciences at University of Maryland, Baltimore as an assistant professor. From 2002-2007 he was an associate professor. In 2007 he became a member of the Biochemistry and Molecular Biology Graduate Program at The University of Maryland, Baltimore. Additionally, from 2003-2006 he was a full member in the Program in Oncology at The University of Maryland Greenebaum Cancer Center. In 2005, Ghandehari became the founding director of the Center for Nanomedicine and Cellular Delivery at The University of Maryland, Baltimore.

=== Career at the University of Utah ===
In 2007 Ghandehari became a USTAR professor professor in the Departments of Pharmaceutics & Pharmaceutical Chemistry and Biomedical Engineering, as well as a member of the Biological Chemistry program at the University of Utah. He became a member of the Huntsman Cancer Institute’s Experimental Therapeutics Program and Genitourinary Disease Oriented Team in 2008. Then in 2010 he founded the Nanotechnology Graduate Training Program. In 2018, Ghandehari became an adjunct professor in the Department of Surgery, Division of Otolaryngology.

Ghandehari founded the Utah Center for Nanomedicine in 2008 and is a founding co-director of the Nano Institute of Utah. The Nano Institute of Utah aims to be a space for researchers from many disciplines to collaborate in order to advance the fields of nanoscience and nanotechnology in many applications.

Ghandehari teaches courses in Nanomedicine and Current Research in Bioengineering, and is a lecturer in Foundations of Pharmaceutics.

One research focus of the Ghandehari lab is the use of recombinant DNA technology for synthesizing protein-based polymers and the use of these polymers in drug and gene delivery applications. One specific polymer of interest is silk-elastin-like protein polymers (SELPs). Genetic engineering techniques can be used to create precise modifications to SELPs in order to control the SELPs properties. SELPs have been researched as a hydrogel for delivery of DNA plasmids, with the amount of DNA plasmid delivery being dependent on the properties of the SELP and the DNA plasmid. The Ghandehari lab has also investigated SELPs in combination with glycosaminoglycans as a treatment for radiation-induced proctitis.

Another research focus is on water-soluble N-(2-hydroxypropyl)methacrylamide polymers. One application of these materials is using high intensity focused ultrasound to increase the accumulation and retention of drugs targeting prostate tumors in combination with polymer therapeutics. The hyperthermia caused by ultrasound upregulates heat-shock glucose-regulated (HS-glucose) protein on the surface of the cells. N-(2-Hydroxypropyl) methacrylamide copolymer was conjugated with peptide targeting HS-glucose to deliver doxatel to the sites that have been exposed to ultrasound. This combination shows improved efficacy when treated with prostate xenografts.

Another research focus of the Ghandehari lab is development of nano-scale poly(amidoamine) (PAMAM) dendrimers that could be administered orally instead of intravenously administration. One specific design is the conjugation of N-acetyl-L-cysteine (NAC) to PAMAM dendrimers to form dendrimer-NACs (D-NACs), which have anti-inflammatory properties relevant to treating acetaminophen poisoning and cerebral palsy. Therefore, an orally bioavailable form could be useful in medicine. The Ghandehari lab found that the use of Capmul, a penetration enhancer recognized as Generally Regarded as Safe by the FDA, with D-NAC, increased oral bioavailability.

Ghadehari’s lab has done research to show that altering properties of silica nanoparticles (NPs), such as porosity, shape, and surface modifications, can alter how toxic the silica NP is to specific cell types. This indicates that silica NPs can be designed to be intentionally toxic to some cell types without harming other cells. This research was then built on conducted using hollow mesoporous silica NPs synthesized with a silica core etched with sodium carbonate, and coated with a disulfide-based silica shell that is sensitive to glutathione (GSH). These NPs have controlled degradation (bulk and surface) properties under physiological conditions with the presence of GSH. The NPs were then loaded with an anticancer drug, doxorubicin, and incubated with different cell types, such as breast cancer epithelial cell, macrophages, and fibroblast, to study about the NPs uptake and toxicity profile. The size of the cavity is tunable in order to control the rate of drug release. His lab also published a study focused onstudied the influence of gold NPs’ core size, shape (rod versus sphere), and surface properties (extent of PEGlylation) on cellular uptake, adsorption of protein and toxicity when treated with human prostate cancer cells. The studies study suggested that by customizing its their properties, each type of gold NPs is promising for different applications. For example, rod-shaped gold NPs are suited for targeting tumor ablation while spherical gold NPs are better suited for drug delivery.

In 2012, Ghandehari became the editor-in-chief of Advanced Drug Delivery Reviews. This peer-reviewed journal focuses on research related to drug and gene delivery systems and their applications.

== Selected awards and honors ==
Ghandehari received the University of Utah College of Engineering Top Undergraduate Teacher Award (2017) and the European Journal of Pharmaceutics and Biopharmaceutics Most Cited Paper Award (2015). Ghandehari is a fellow of the American Institute for Medical and Biological Engineering (2008), the American Association of Pharmaceutical Scientists (2011), and the Controlled Release Society (2015).
