= Safi Lakhnavi =

Urdu writer

Safi Lakhnavi (Urdu: صفی لکھنوی, Hindi: सफ़ी लखनवी), born Syed Ali Naqi Zaidi (2 January 1862 – 1950), was a prominent Urdu poet. He was born in the city of Lucknow, India in a family of Zaidi Syeds who claimed direct descent from Husain ibn Ali.

His father Syed Fazal Husain was appointed an Ataliq (tutor) to Prince Suleiman Qader Bahadur, son of Nawab Amjad Ali of Awadh.

He was educated at the Canning Collegiate at Lucknow and served in the Revenue Department of the Government. He began writing verse at the young age of 13 under the pseudonym of Safi without any guidance from an Ustad (teacher), when having an Ustad was the norm.

The poetry of Safi is characterised by the use of simple and sweet language of the people, making him very popular among the common folk. Some of his immortal couplets are :

" Ghazal usne chheri, mujhe saaz dena, Zara umre rafta ko Awaz dena "

" Too bhi mayuse tamana mire andaz mein hai, jabhi to dard papihay teri aavaaz mein hai "

" Janaza rok kar mera voh is andaaz mein bole; gali ham ne kahi thi, tum to duniya chhore jaate ho''''''

Safi Laknavi was a poet of the people and his poetry was innovative and reformist in tone. He was honoured by being called Lassan-ul-Qaum (outstanding spokesman of the people.)

His considerable literary works include Aghosh-i-Madar, Tanzim-ul-Hayat, and Diwan-i-Safi. His poetry craft is taught in graduate and post-graduate Urdu programmes.

Amarnath Jha, the great educationist and the former Vice Chancellor of Allahabad University, was among his many admirers.
