= Hamid Tuah =

Malaysian activist

Hamid Tuah (1919–1997) was a Malaysian peasant leader who advocated land reforms for the rural poor. While not formally a socialist politician, his activities involved numerous protests and detentions and placed him firmly in left-wing politics in the early days of the country's independence.

== Early life ==
Tuah was born in Babus Salam, Tanjung Pura, Langkat in north Sumatra in 1919. In his early adulthood he was inspired by the independence movements in both Indonesia and Malaya. Having moved to Malaya he joined the left-wing youth movement Angkatan Pemuda Insaf which was led by future socialist leader Ahmad Boestamam.

During the Emergency (1948-1960), he was a police constable and was eventually posted to Banting, Selangor. He got drawn into the struggle of landless peasants, helping secure land for more than 100 villages in Johan Setia in the late 1950s. In Sungai Sireh, Selangor in November 1960 he was arrested after he had led a group of rural poor to clear land, divert river waters and build houses. When Tuah was arrested, hundreds of farmers protested outside the Pudu Jail and threatened a mass hunger strike which alarmed the government. He was released after a few days.

In May 1961, he was again arrested after leading peasants from Kampung Sungai Sireh to protest outside the office of the Selangor Mentri Besar Abu Bakar Baginda. Upon his release he was not permitted to enter the Ulu Bernam district where he had been active.

== 1974 Baling protests ==
In September 1974, inspired by Hamid Tuah, landless peasants struggling under rising prices and falling wages staged a civil protest in Tasek Utara, Johor. This saw underprivileged villagers rose against evictions and the demolition of their homes. Again, the villagers allied with university students such as future Parti Sosialis Rakyat Malaysia (PSRM) leader and Pasir Gudang MP Hassan Abdul Karim.

In November of that year, larger protests in Baling, Kedah led to thousands of protesters being tear-gassed, news of which reached universities nationwide despite the lack of media coverage. According to PSRM leader and Universiti Malaya university professor Syed Husin Ali, Hamid Tuah was not directly involved in the 1974 protests but his children Siti Nor and Damhore were.

On Dec 3, thousands of students gathered at the Selangor Club padang, reasserting the farmers’ demands and calling for action against corrupt politicians. More than 1,100 students were detained.

Student activist Hishamuddin Rais fled the country to avoid arrest, while another noted student leader Anwar Ibrahim was detained under the Internal Security Act for nearly two years. Syed Husin himself was detained for six years.

== Legacy ==
Hamid Tuah died in January 1997. A village in the Telok Gong area was named Kampung Hamid Tuah after him. His daughter Siti Nor was a long time socialist activist with Parti Sosialis Rakyat Malaysia, being active from the 1970s to the 2000s. She ran for Parliament as an independent in a by-election for Kuala Kedah in 1973, and representing PSRM in the Ulu Nerus seat in 1974, losing on both occasions.
