= Samuel Babatunde Adejare =

Nigerian politician

- Born: June 9, 1961 (age 65)
- Citizenship: Nigerian
- Occupation: Politician
- Political party: All Progressives Congress (APC)

Babatunde Samuel Adejare is a medical practitioner and former member of the House of Representatives who represented the Agege Federal Constituency between 2011 and 2015.

== Early life, education and career ==
Babatunde Samuel Adejare was born on June 9, 1961. He received his First School Leaving Certificate (FSLC) from St. Paul's Catholic Primary School in Ebutte Metta, Lagos, where he studied between 1967 and 1973. He went on to attend St. Anthony Grammar School in Esure, Ijebu Mushin, Ogun State from 1974 to 1980, where he obtained the West African School Certificate (WASC). He then pursued his Higher School Certificate (HSC) at the International School, University of Ibadan. After completing his M.B.B.S at the College of Medicine, University of Ilorin from 1983 to 1988, he earned a Master's degree in Public Health from Lagos State University.

He began his professional career in 1989 as a House Officer at Ikeja General Hospital. As the primary medical officer responsible for patient care, he performed duties such as general patient care, clerking, working up patients, treatment, surgeries, and rehabilitation. He also contributed to medical presentations and conducted research as part of his patient management responsibilities. From 1993 to 2003, he served as the Chief Medical Director at Graces' Medical Centre.

== Political career ==
He was elected into the Lagos state House of assembly in 2003 and re-elected in 2007 under the 7th and 8th Legislative Assemblies. He served two terms as the Chairman House Committee on Health. In 2011, he was also elected as a member of the Federal House Of Representative on the All Progressives Congress (APC) platform representing Agege Federal Constituency. He was appointed the Lagos State Commissioner for the Environment in 2015 and also the Lagos State Commissioner for Waterfront and Infrastructure development in 2018 by His Excellency, Mr. Akinwunmi Ambode, the former Governor of Lagos State. He won the Federal House of Representatives seat on the All Progressives Congress platform in the 2019 Nigeria General Elections representing Agege Federal Constituency.
