= Hamid Ferej =

Eritrean politician

Hamid Ferej was born in Barka in modern-day Eritrea. He was a prominent figure in Eritrean politics. In the year 1956 he was elected to be the president of the Eritrean parliament. He was the president of the Eritrean parliament from the year 1956 to 1962.
