= Azim =

- Pronunciation: Arabic: [ˈʕaˌðˤiːm]
- Gender: Other

Origin
- Origin: Arabic
- Meaning: Great, Magnificent

Other names
- Alternative spelling: Adhim, Azeem, Adheem
- Related names: Abdul Azim, Azimullah

Azim (ʿAẓīm عظيم) is one of the names of Allah in Islam, meaning "Great" or "Magnificent" or "Protector" Also used as a personal name, as short form of the Abdolazim, Abdul Azim, "Servant of the Magnificent". It is used by many Sahrawi people as a surname originating from the Hassaniya Arabic.

The word Azim or Al Azim is also a Nisba used in Oman for people from the village of Azim in Gwadar (During Omani Gwadar) near Shinkani Dar

Notable people with the name include:

Given name:

- Abdel Azim Ashry (1911–1997), Egyptian basketball player
- Azim Hussein, Indo-Fijian educationalist and politician
- Tariq Azim Khan, Pakistani politician
- Azim Nanji, Kenyan-born professor of Islamic studies
- Azim Premji (born 1945), Indian business tycoon
- Seyid Azim Shirvani (1835–1888), Azerbaijani poet
- Azim Surani (born 1945), Kenyan-British developmental biologist

Surname:

- Hazem Abdel-Azim (born 1960), Egyptian government opponent, senior adviser to the telecommunications minister in 2007
- Essam Abdel-Azim (born 1970), football footballer of Egypt national football team
- Abdul Azim Al-Aliwat (born 1967), Saudi Arabian athlete, competed in the men's javelin throw at the 1988 Summer Olympics
- Eshan Azim, Last Wali of Omani Gwadar

== See also ==
- Azim, Western Saraha, a village in Sahrawi Controlled Western Sahara, Sahrawi Arab Democratic Republic
- Al Azim Mosque, the state mosque of Malacca, Malaysia
- Azamat
- Ashkenazim
