= Adeem =

Adeem may refer to:

- Abdul-Adeem Karjimi, Moroccan footballer
- Adeem (rapper), American hip-hop artist
- Adeem Investment, a Kuwaiti investment company
- Adeem Hashmi, (1946-2001) Pakistani poet
- Adeem the Artist (1988-), American country music singer

== See also ==
- Abdul Azim or Abdul Adeem
- El Hob El Adeem, Fadel Shaker album
