= Abd al-Azim =

ʻAbd al-ʻAẓīm (ALA-LC romanization of Arabic: عبد العظيم) is a male Muslim given name. It is built from the Arabic words ʻabd and al-ʻAẓīm, one of the names of God in the Qur'an, which give rise to the Muslim theophoric names.

It may refer to:

- Abd al-Azim al-Hasani
- 'Abd al-'Azim 'Anis
- Abdel Azim Ashry (1911–1997), Egyptian basketball player
- Abdul Azim al-Deeb (1929–2010), Egyptian professor of jurisprudence at Qatar University
- Wajih Abdel-Azim, Egyptian footballer
- Abdul-Adeem Karjimi, Moroccan footballer

== See also ==
- Shah-Abdol-Azim shrine, shrine in Rey, Iran
