= Azamat =

Azamat is a Central Asian male given name that means greatness or magnificence and may refer to:

== People ==
- Azamat Abduraimov, Uzbek footballer
- Azamat Balkarov, Russian footballer for FC Angusht Nazran
- Azamat Gonezhukov, Russian footballer for FC Dynamo St. Petersburg
- Azamat Ishenbaev, Kyrgyz footballer
- Azamat Kuliev, Russian painter
- Azamat Kurachinov, Russian footballer for FC Dynamo Stavropol and FC Stavropol beginning in 2007
- Azamat Sydykov, Kyrgyz pianist

== Fictional characters ==
- Azamat Bagatov, a fictional character from the film Borat: Cultural Learnings of America for Make Benefit Glorious Nation of Kazakhstan

== Origin ==
The name Azamat is derived from Arabic azamah (عظمة), meaning "majesty, glory." In Islamic literature, the meaning of this name is "grandeur, pride."

== See also ==
- Azim
