= Photo shoot =

Phtotography session of a certain subject

A photo shoot is the process taken by creatives and models that results in a visual objective being obtained. An example is a model posing for a photographer at a studio or an outdoor location.

A photo shoot is a series of images that are taken, with the goal of obtaining images that can then be placed into post-production, or editing. These images are then used for print/digital advertising, business collateral, or just for personal use.

An amateur photo shoot is more likely to be under the arrangement of Trade-For-Portfolio (TFP), whereas a professional photo shoot for a brand or product is likely to be a paid arrangement. With TFP photo shoots, the agreement is often that everyone involved in the shoot will receive the high-resolution, edited images as a form of payment.

With professional photo shoots, the contract is generally signed via a representative modelling agency and so payment is generally always monetary. Due to this, models may not be guaranteed to get the images returned to them as it is the property of the hiring firm/individual. Many photo shoots hire models from professional modelling agencies, and may also hire stylists, makeup and hair artists.

== Types of photo shoots ==
- Food and beverage
- Products and lifestyle
- Architecture and interiors
- E-commerce
- General lifestyle
- Portrait photography and head shots
- Conceptual photography
- Posed newborn
- Photojournalism
- Fashion
- Erotic, nude, and pornographic photography
- Sports
- Still life
- Editorial
- Documentary
- Nature
- Landscape
- Astrophotography
- Pet photography
- Storm
- Flower
- Real estate
- Black and white
- Fine art
- Wedding
- Double exposure
- Abstract

== Gallery ==
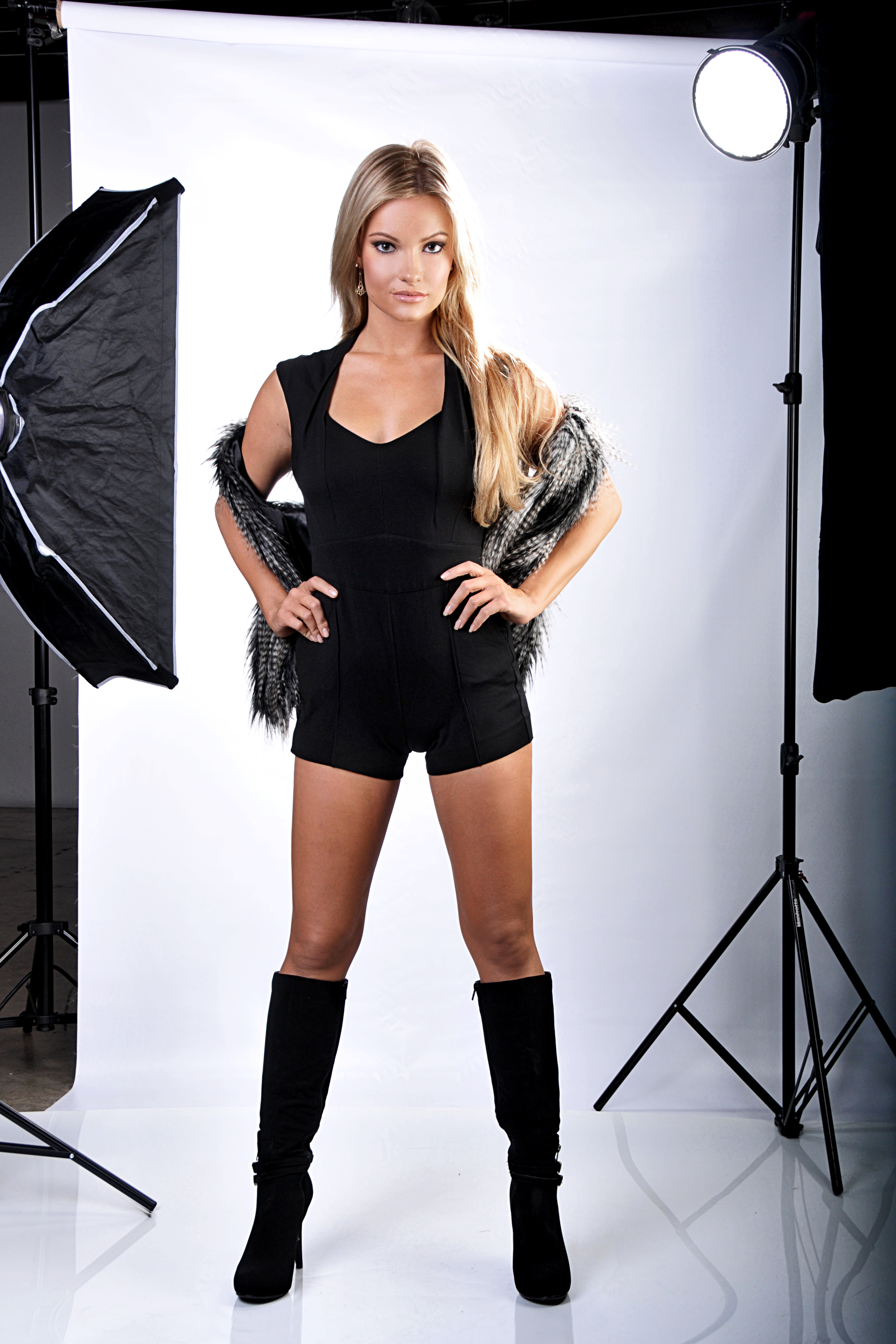
Model posing on typical studio set

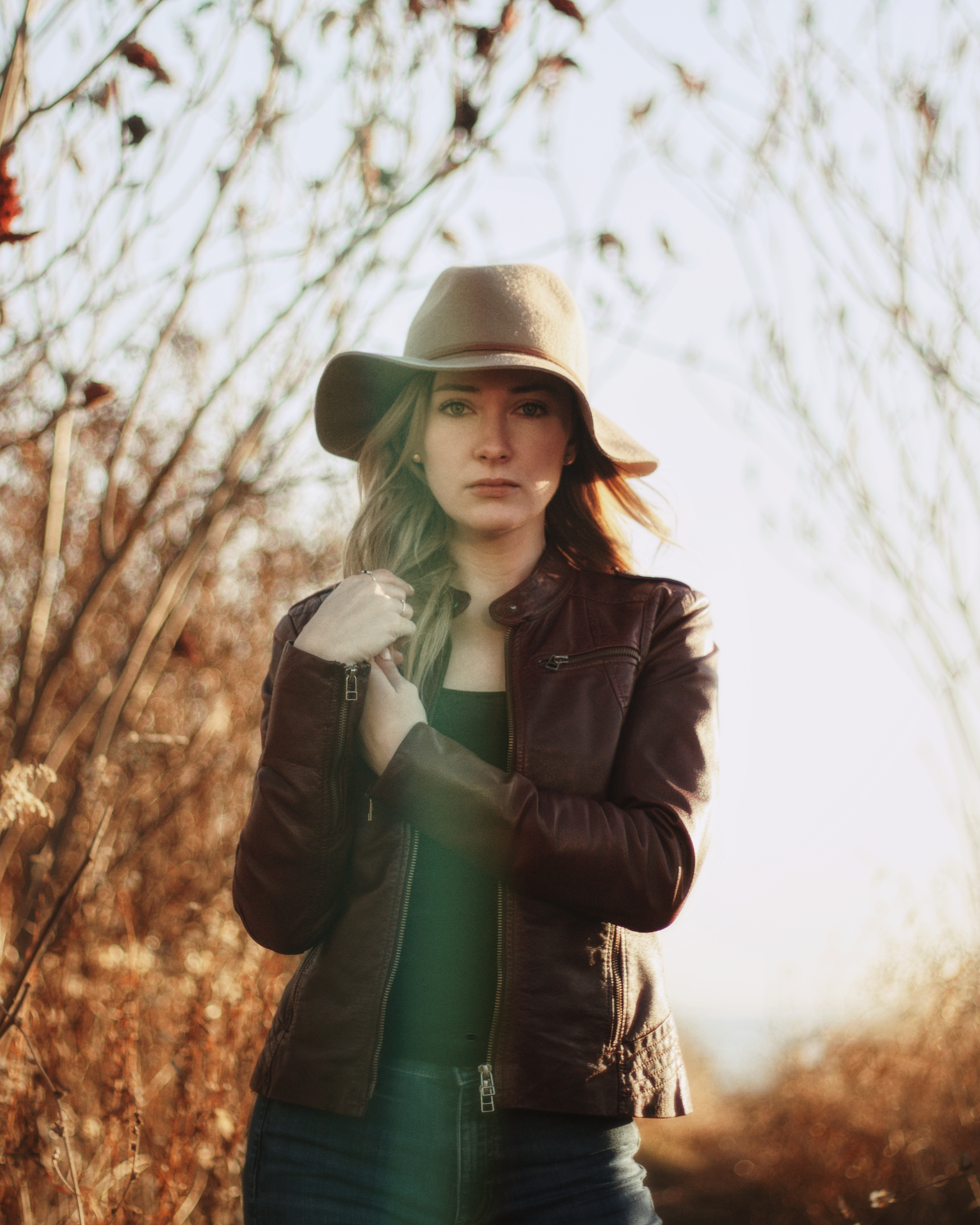
Outdoor location shoot

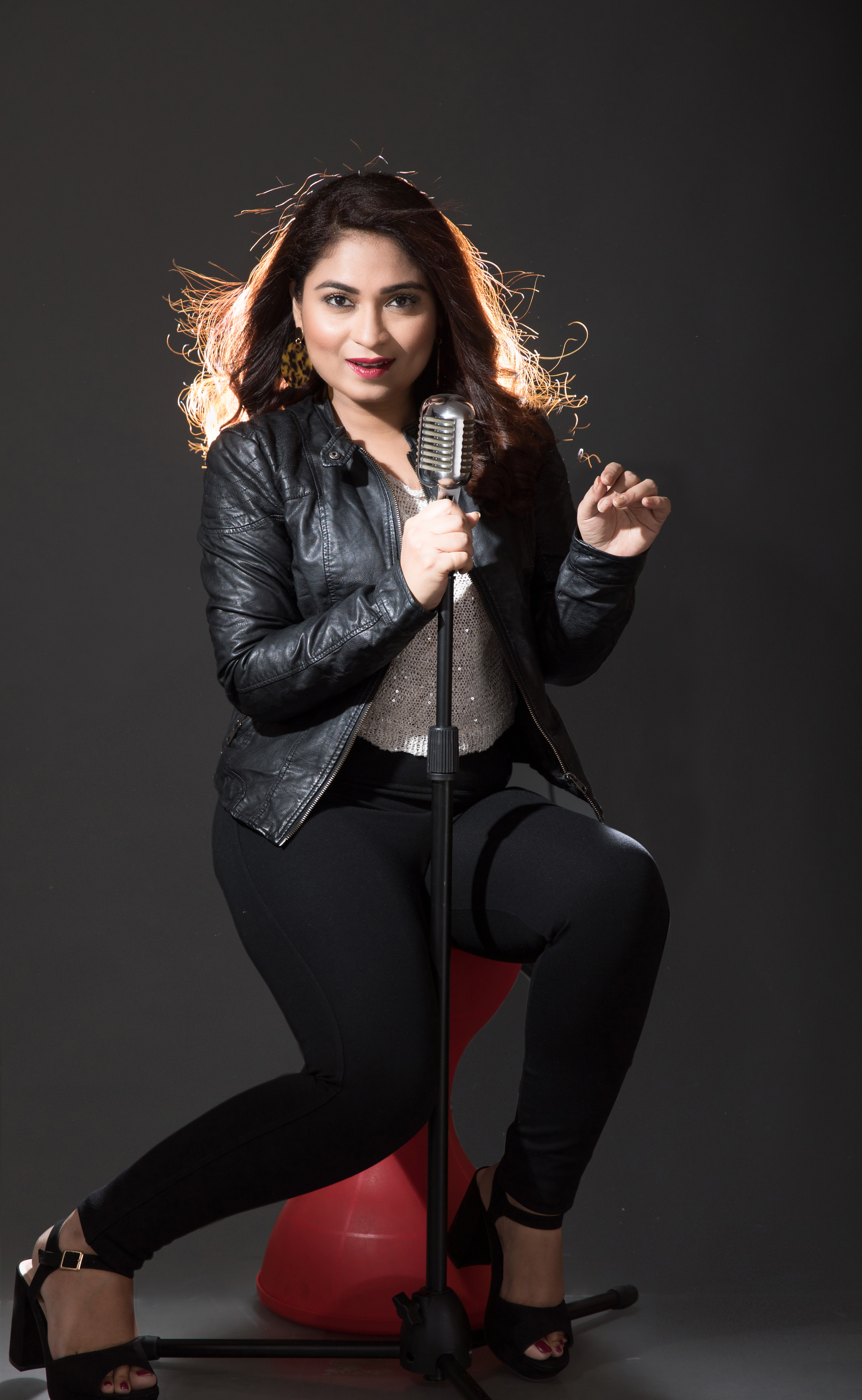
Photo shoot for an album

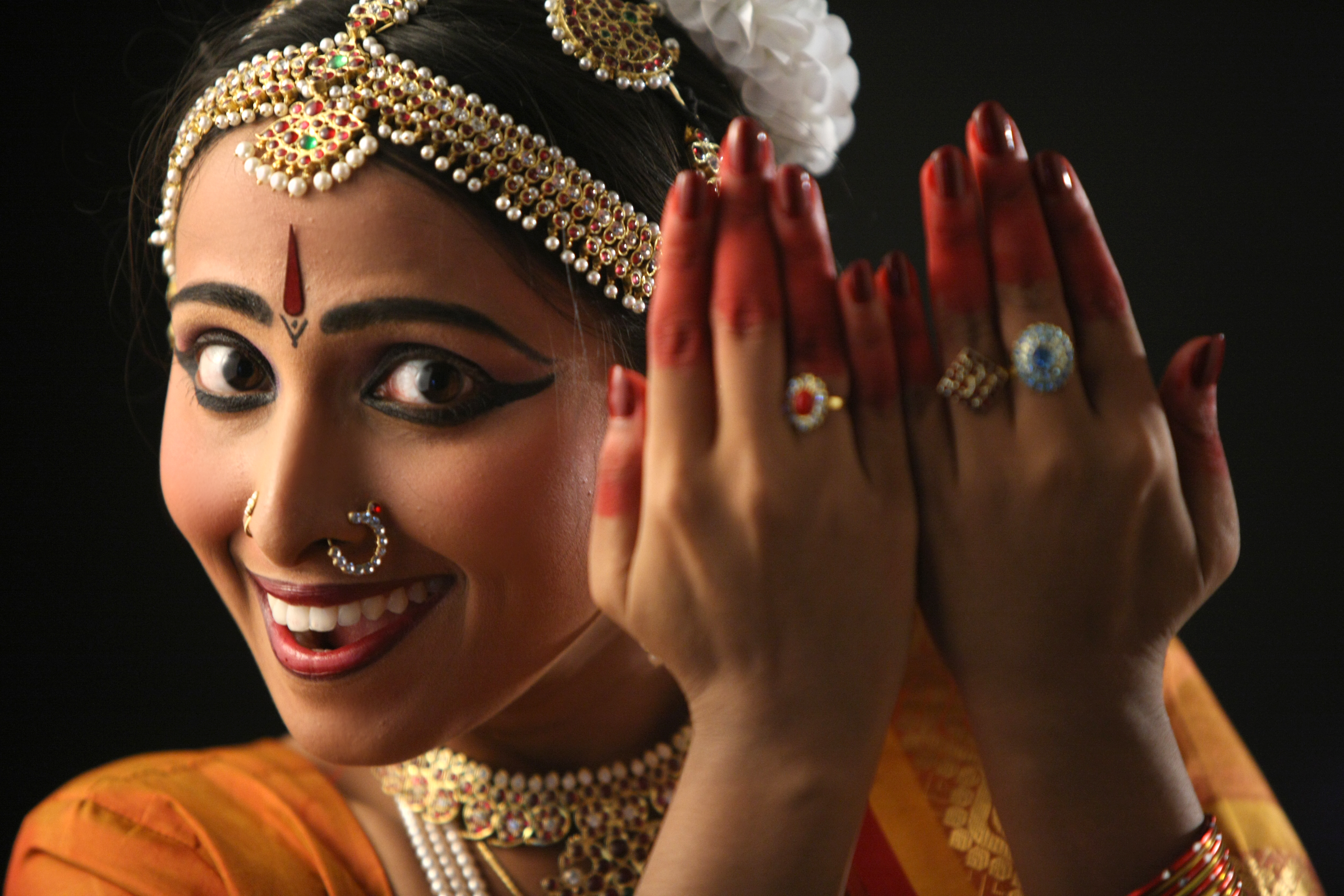
Photo shoot of a dancer

Photo shoot of a band

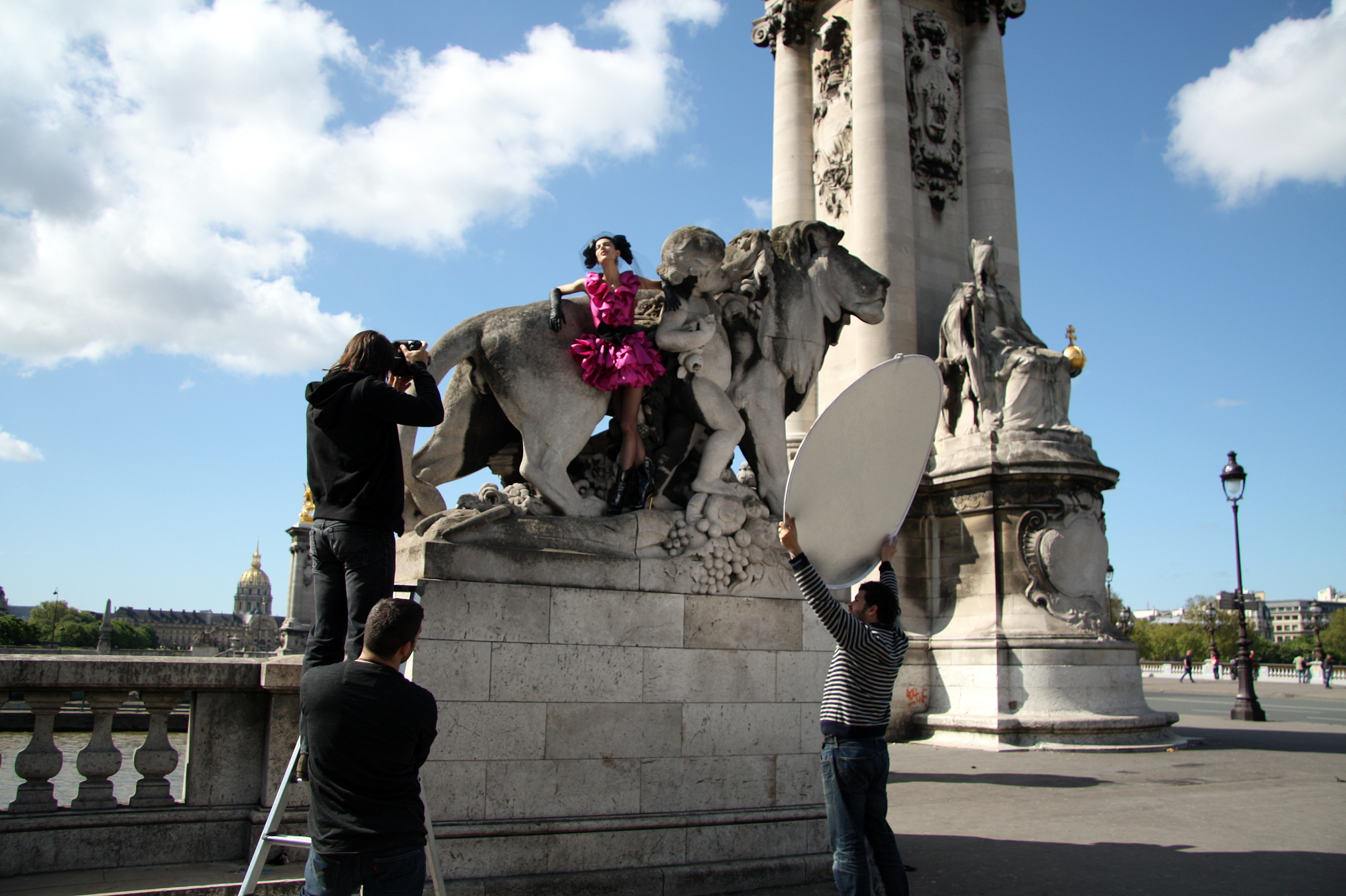
Photo shoot in Paris, 2012

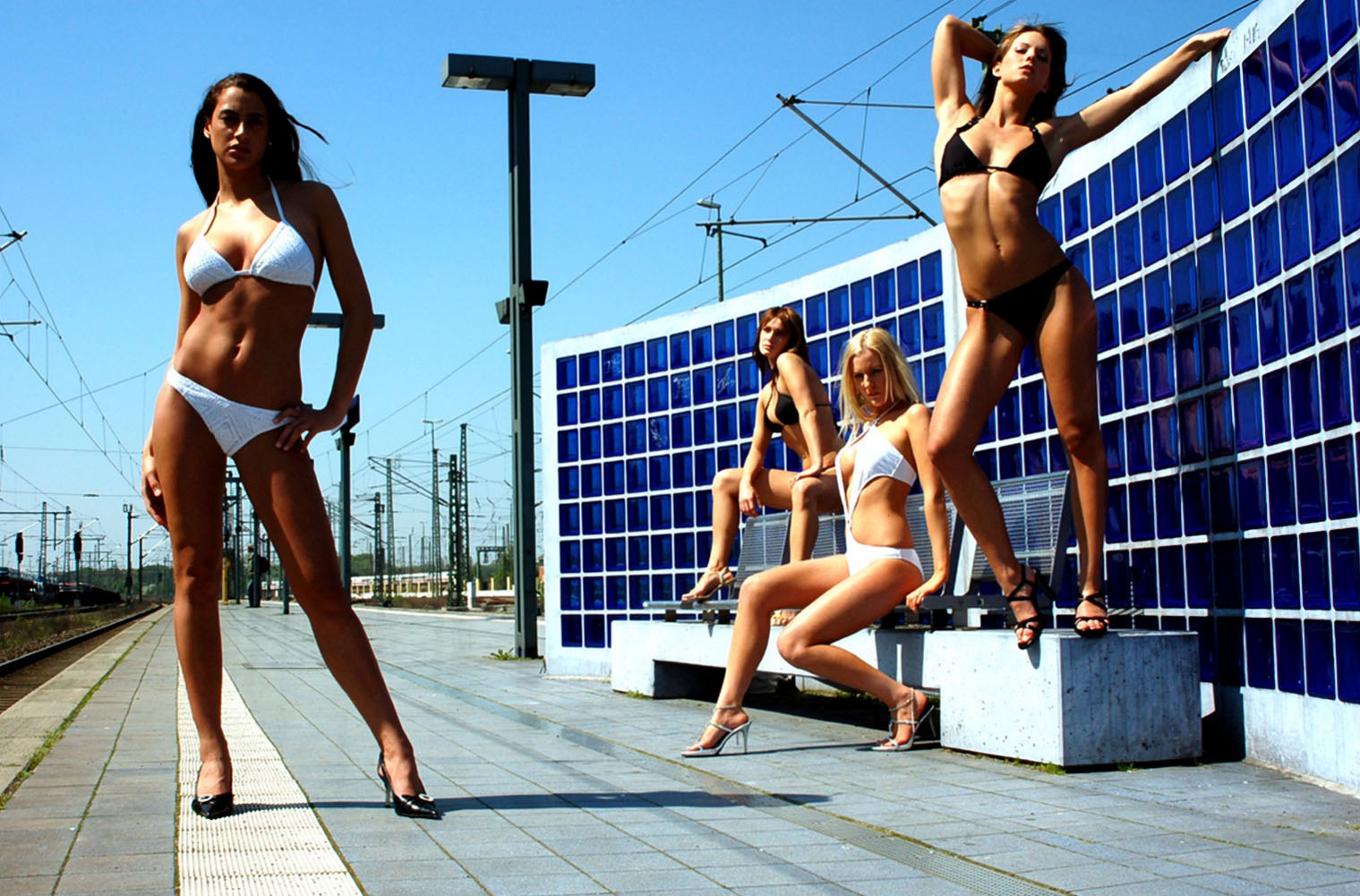
Models in bikinis for a photo shoot in Hanover, Germany, 2011

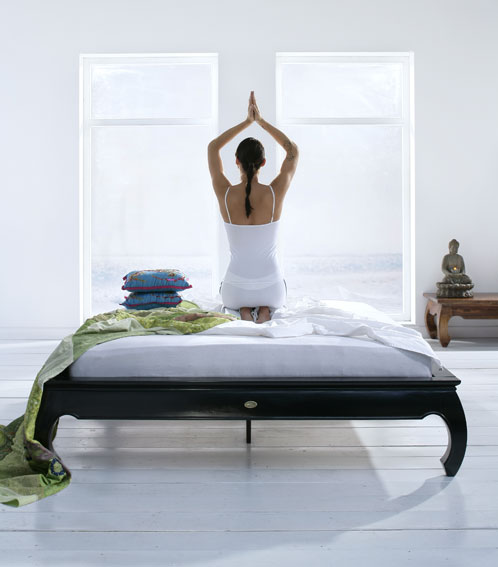
An example of advertising photography

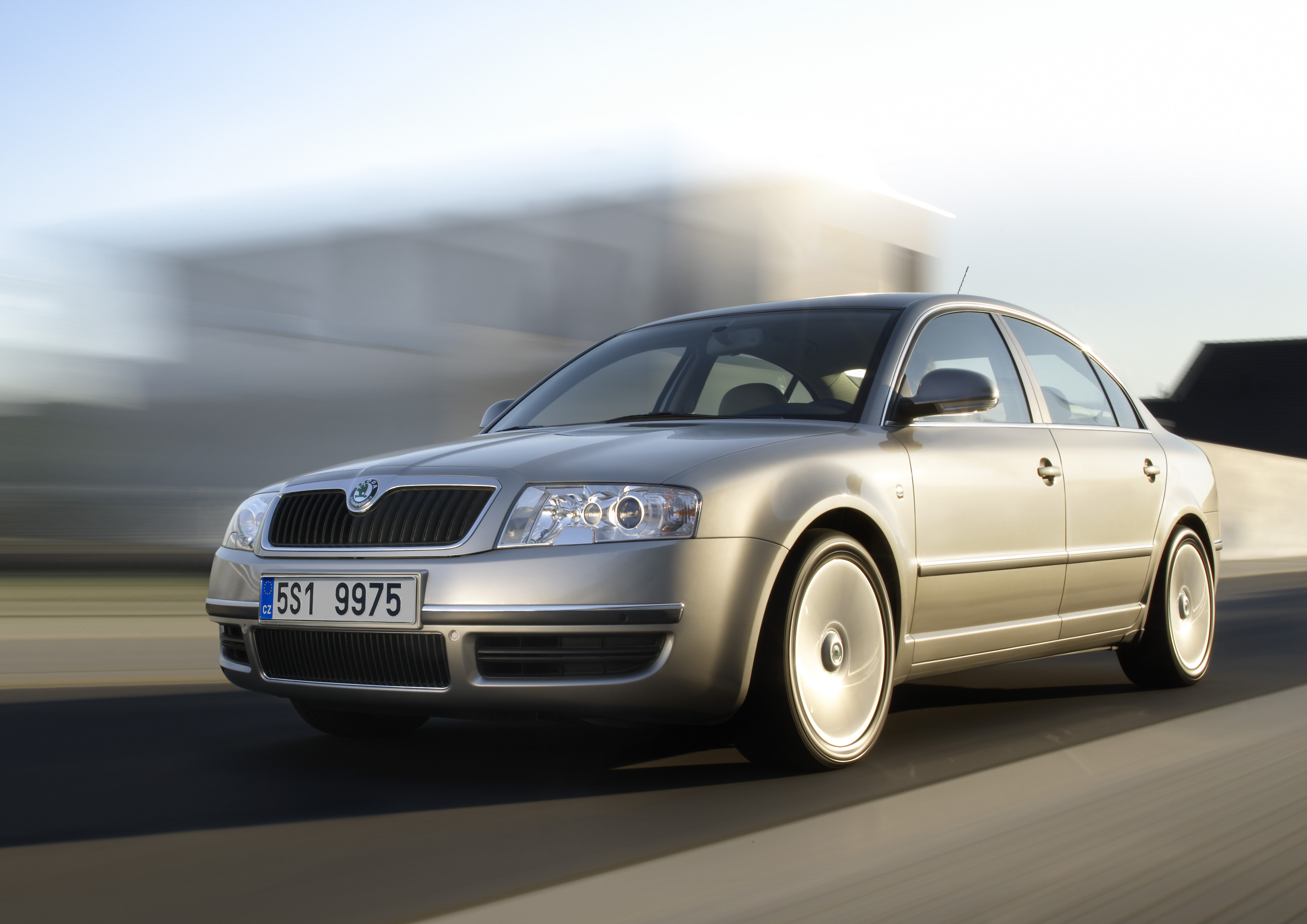
Photo shoot of an industrial product

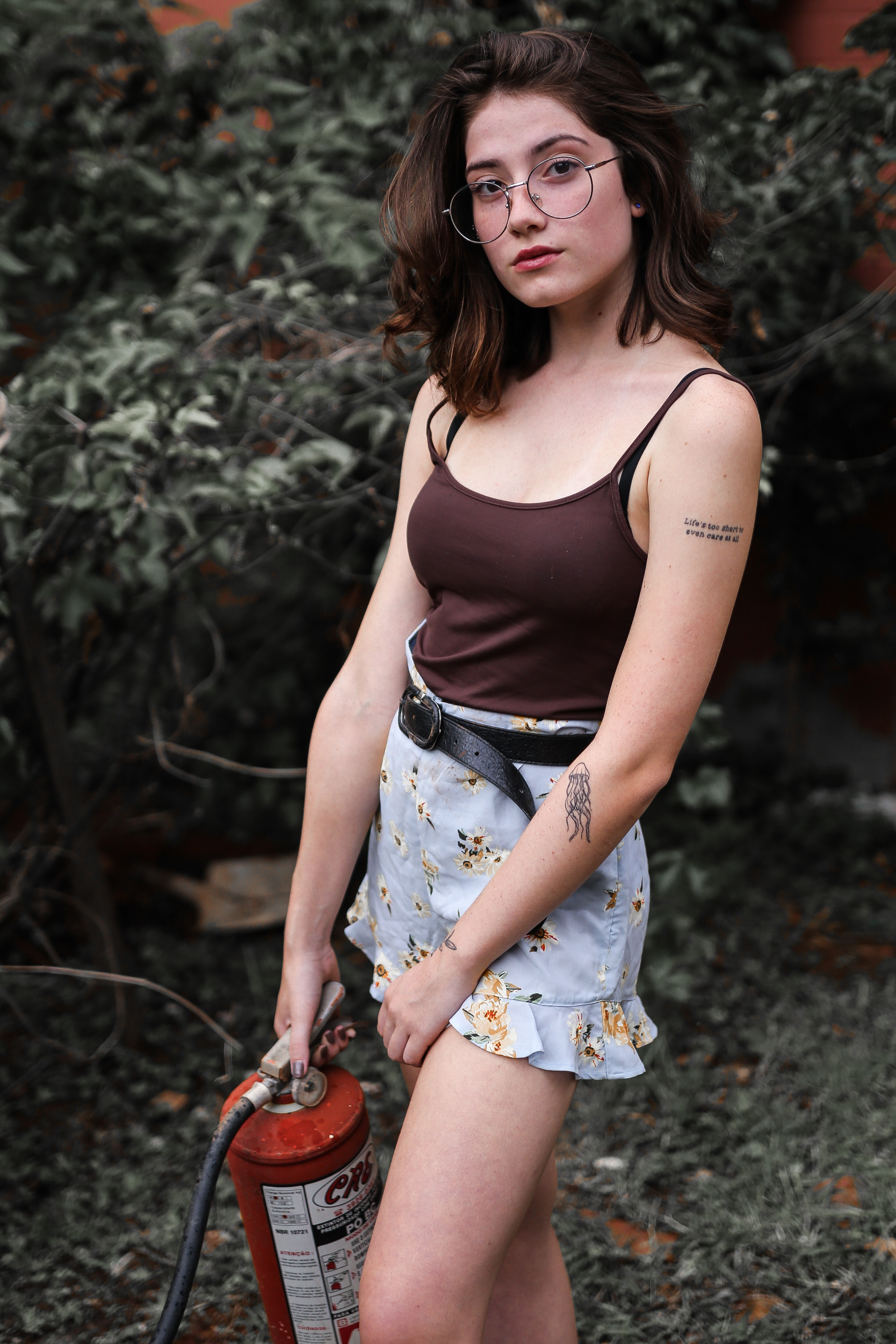
A photo shoot for stock photos

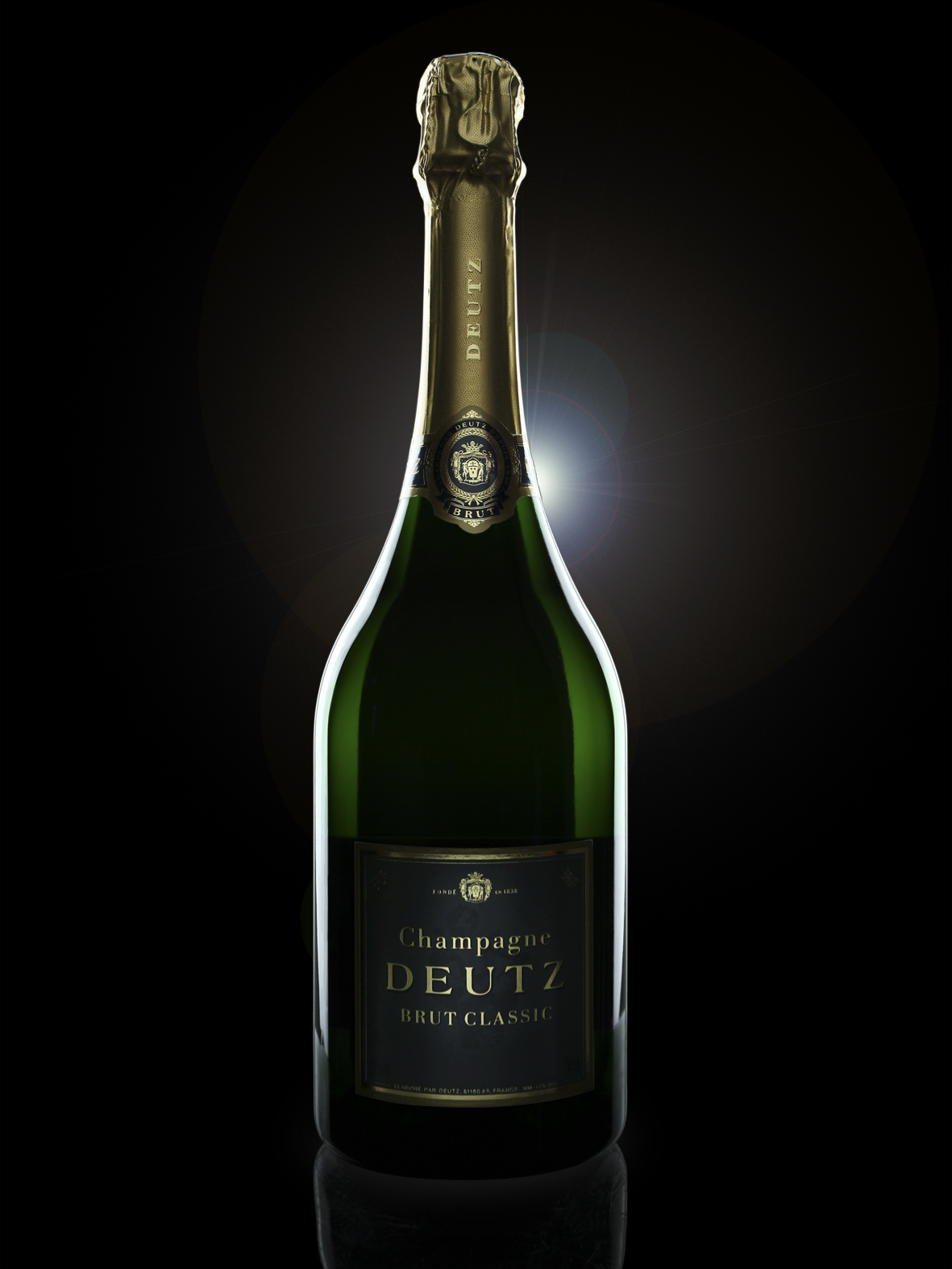
Photo shoot of a product

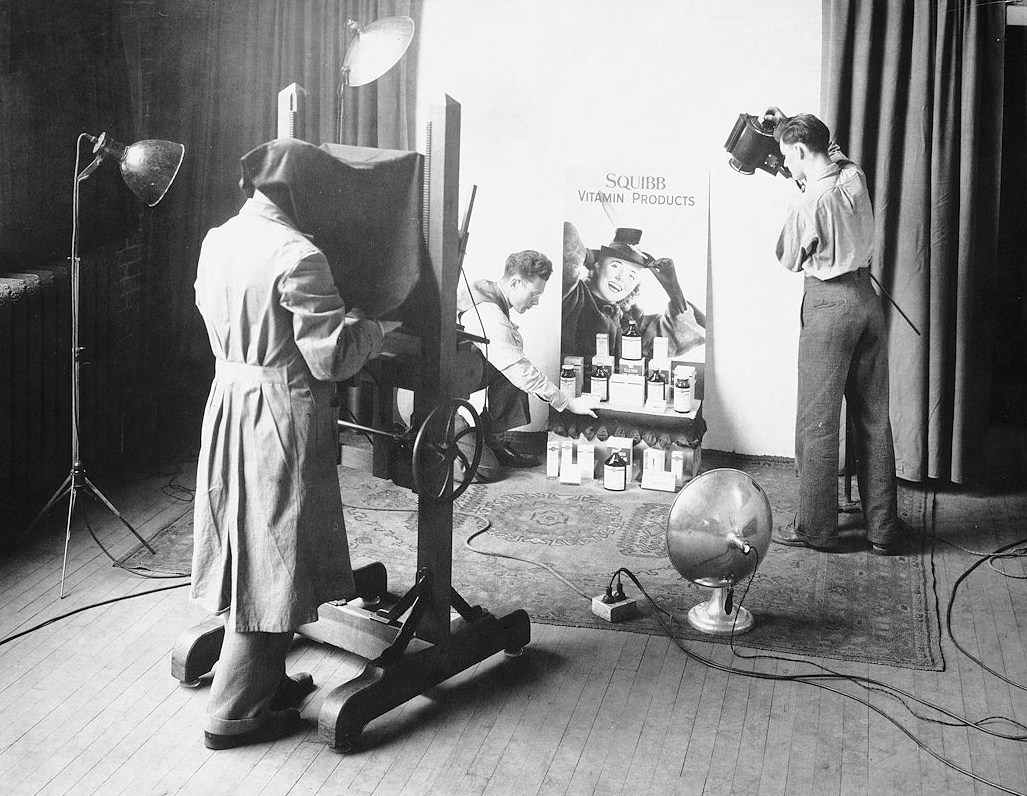
Photo shooting, in a studio in Canada, 1922

== See also ==
- Glamour photography
