= Azimullah =

Azimullah is a male Muslim given name, composed of the elements Azim and Allah. It may refer to

- Azimullah Khan (1830–1859), Anti-colonial freedom fighter who organised the Indian War of Independence
- Evert Azimullah, Surinamese diplomat, politician and writer
