= Hamza ibn Musa ibn Ja'far =

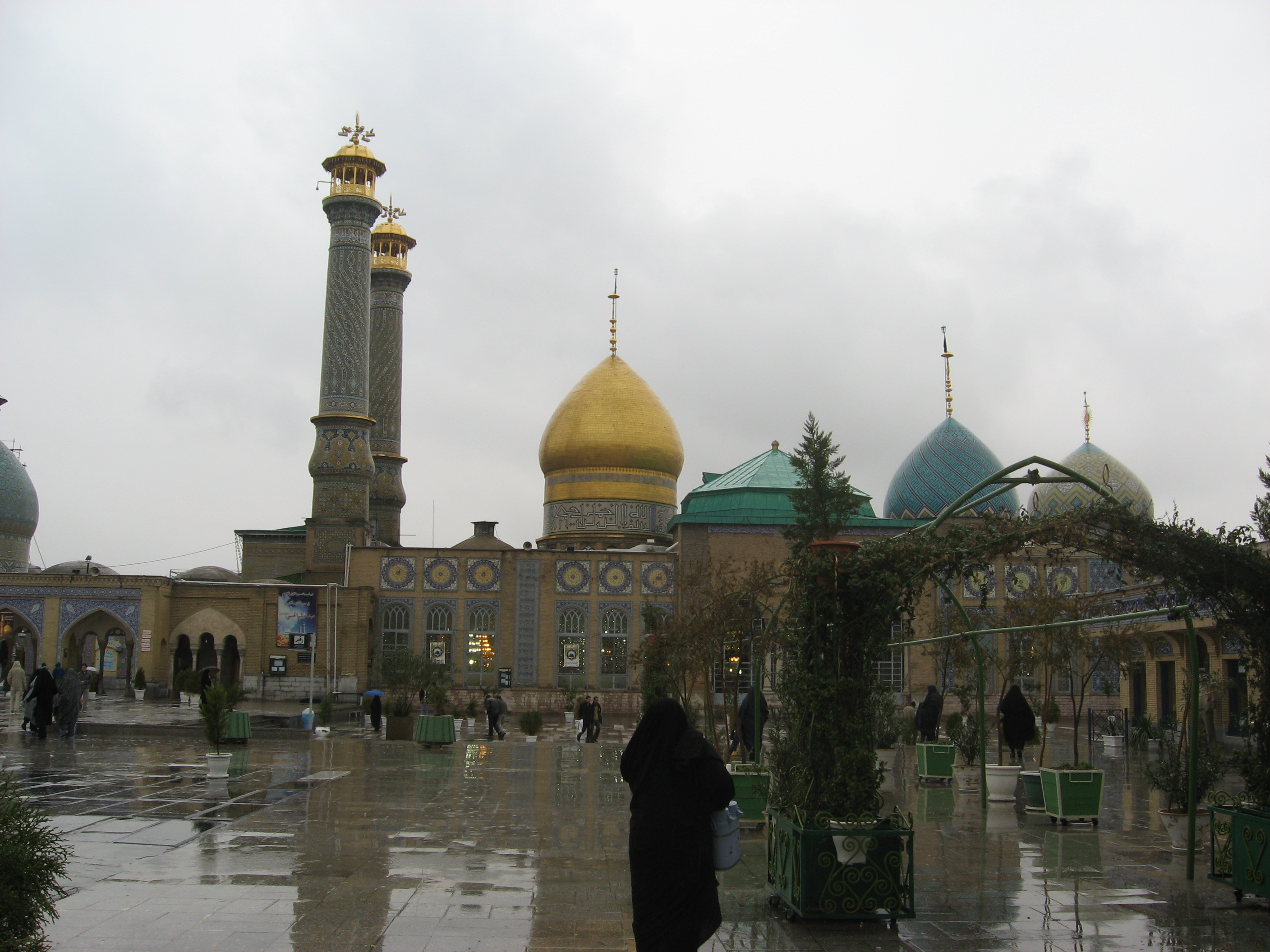
From left to right: the domes of Abd al-Azim al-Hasani, Hamzah ibn Musa, and Imamzadeh Tahir.

Hamza ibn Musa ibn Ja'far (Arabic: الحمزة بن مُوسی بن جَعفَر), was a son of Musa al-Kazim, the seventh Shiite Imam, and a brother of Ali ibn Musa al-Rida, the eighth Imam. His grave is in Rey, next to the tomb of Shah Abdul Azim. He died in Rey while traveling to Khorasan to visit his brother Reza. It is said that Shah Abdul Azim al-Hasani used to visit this grave and would say: "This is the tomb of one of the sons of Musa al-Kazim." There are several Imamzadehs named Hamza in Iran, the most famous of which is the Imamzadeh Hamza in Tehran.

== Ancestry ==
Hamza's father was Imam Musa al-Kazim. According to the author of Muntakhab al-Tawarikh, his mother was Umm Ahmad, which makes Hamza the maternal brother of Ahmad ibn Musa—known as Shah Cheragh—and also of Muhammad, another son of Musa ibn Ja'far. Regarding Umm Ahmad, it has been written that she was one of the respected and righteous women of her time. Musa al-Kazim held her in special esteem and placed great trust in her, to the extent that she is counted among his trusted confidants and even considered one of his appointed successors (awsiya').

His teknonym (kunya) is reported to have been Abu al-Qasim.

== Migration to Iran and Death ==
Ahmad ibn Musa, along with his brother Imamzadeh Hamza, Sayyid Ala' al-Din Hussain, and other sayyids, was heading toward Khorasan to visit Ali ibn Musa (Imam Reza). On the way, they encountered the army of Qutlugh Khan, the governor of Shiraz. Since Ahmad's companions were not prepared for battle and some were already wounded and injured, they fled the scene. After these events, Ahmad ibn Musa himself was killed.

Given this, it can be suggested that Imamzadeh Hamza was wounded in this clash with the governor of Shiraz's forces and fled to the city of Rey. There, he was either recognized and killed by the soldiers of Caliph al-Ma'mun, or he died from the wounds he had sustained.

== See also ==
- Fatima bint Musa
- Ahmad ibn Musa ibn Ja'far
