= Ahmad ibn Musa ibn Ja'far =

Son of the Seventh Twelver Imam

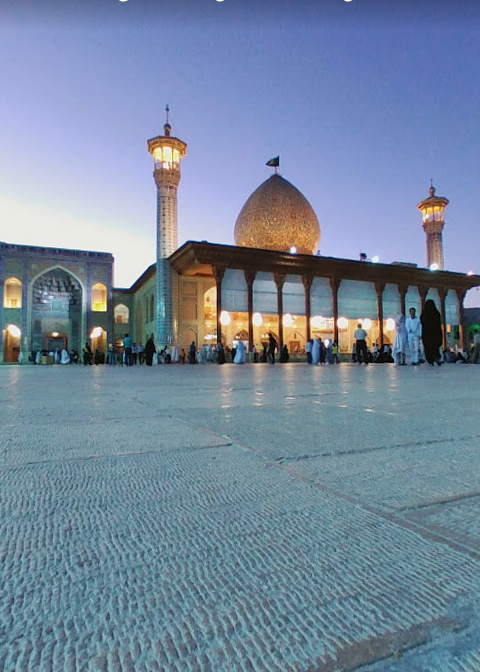
Shah Cheragh

Ahmad ibn Musa ibn Ja'far (Arabic: أحمَد بن مُوسی بن جَعفَر), commonly known as Shahchiragh (Persian: شاهچراغ) , was a son of Musa al‑Kazim, the seventh Imam in Twelver Shia Islam. He is regarded as an Imamzadah — a term used for descendants of Imams — and is a well‑known religious figure in Iran. In addition to being a Shiite jurist, he was also a narrator of hadith. He traveled to Iran during the caliphate of al‑Ma'mun, the Abbasid caliph. After learning of the death of his brother, Ali al‑Rida (the eighth Imam), he remained in Shiraz, where he was later killed. His grave in Shiraz remained unknown or unmarked for several centuries.

== Ancestry ==
The exact year of his birth has not been recorded. He was the son of Musa ibn Ja'far, recognized as the seventh Imam by Twelver Shiites. His mother, Umm Ahmad, was Musa ibn Ja'far's wife and the mother of some of his children. According to Shia narrations, she was known as the most knowledgeable, devout, and well‑spoken woman in Musa ibn Ja'far's household. These same narrations say that Musa ibn Ja'far trusted her with his secrets and personal belongings.

== Biography ==
After Ali al-Rida moved from Medina to Khorasan — a move initiated by the Abbasid Caliph al-Ma'mun, who appointed him as his crown prince — a considerable number of Shiites and supporters of the Prophet's household (Ahl al-Bayt) traveled from various regions to Iran to pay their respects to him. Among these travelers was Ahmad ibn Musa, the son of Musa al-Kazim and a brother of Ali al-Rida. According to historical accounts, he traveled from Medina to Khorasan along with his brothers — Sayyid Ala al-Din Husayn and Muhammad Abed — as well as many nephews and followers. When news reached the Abbasid Caliph al-Ma'mun about the movement of this large caravan — which included members of the Banu Hashim and their supporters — he grew concerned. Believing it posed a potential threat to the stability of his rule, he ordered the caravan to be stopped and turned back. The governor of Shiraz at the time, a man named Qutulgh Khan, was instructed to set up camp with his army roughly eight farsakhs (about 48 km) from Shiraz and block the caravan's path. According to sources, he issued a blunt ultimatum: "Turn back, or you will be killed." Ahmad ibn Musa is said to have replied: "I am going to visit my noble brother (Ali al-Rida). If you can, block the way."

A violent clash followed. The resistance put up by the Banu Hashim caused the government forces to scatter and retreat. However, about a year later, spies working for Qutulgh Khan located Ahmad ibn Musa, cornered him in a fight, and killed him.

== Shrine ==
He was killed in Shiraz on 17 Rajab 202 AH by agents of the contemporary government. Certain historical sources claim that his burial place remained unknown for three hundred years, after which it was discovered during the reign of 'Adud al-Dawla, a ruler from the Daylamite dynasty.

== See also ==
- Fatima bint Musa
- Hamza ibn Musa ibn Ja'far
