= Conceptual photography =

Type of photography

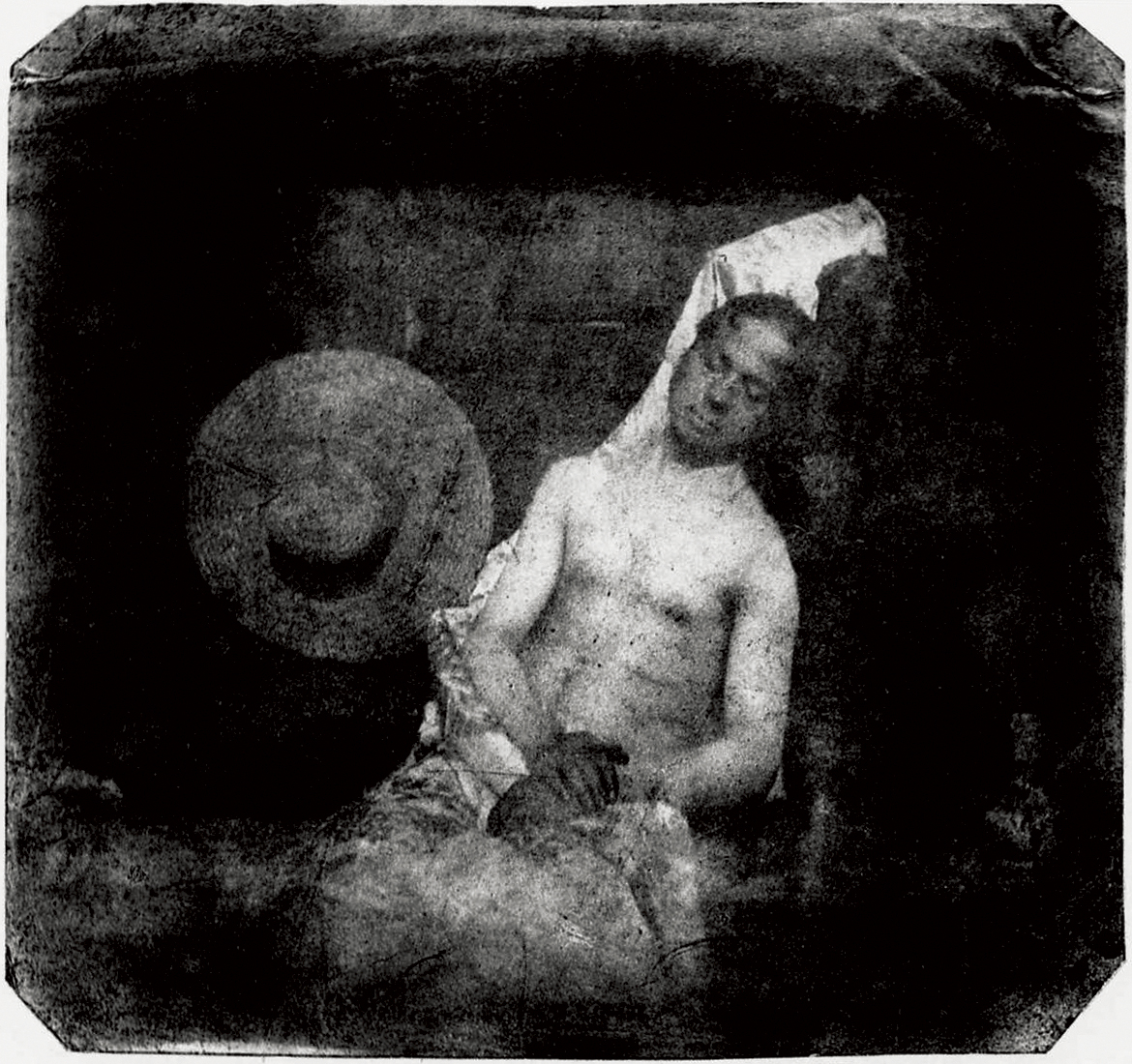
Hippolyte Bayard: Self Portrait as a Drowned Man (1840)

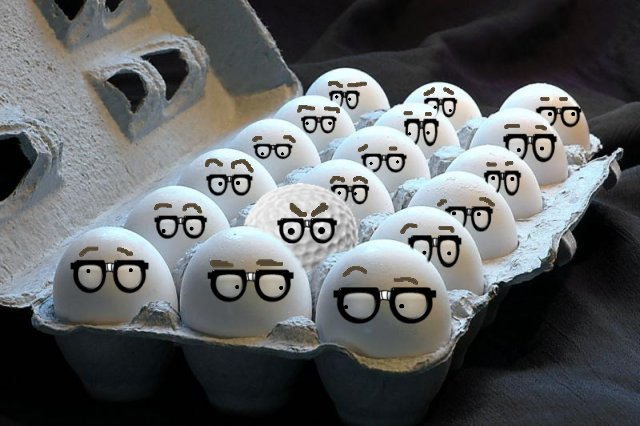
A conceptual photograph illustrating integration

Conceptual photography is a type of photography that illustrates an idea. There have been illustrative photographs made since the medium's invention, for example in the earliest staged photographs, such as Hippolyte Bayard's Self Portrait as a Drowned Man (1840). However, the term conceptual photography derives from conceptual art, a movement of the late 1960s. Today the term is used to describe either a methodology or a genre.

== Conceptual photography as a methodology ==
As a methodology conceptual photography is a type of photography that is staged to represent an idea. The 'concept' is both preconceived and, if successful, understandable in the completed image. It is most often seen in advertising and illustration where the picture may reiterate a headline or catchphrase that accompanies it. Photographic advertising and illustration commonly derive from stock photography, which is often produced in response to current trends in image usage as determined by the research of picture agencies like Getty Images or Corbis. These photographs are therefore produced to visualize a predetermined concept. The advent of picture editing software like Adobe Photoshop has allowed the greater manipulation of images to seamlessly combine elements that previously it would only have been possible to combine in graphic illustration.

== Conceptual photography as a genre ==
The term 'conceptual photography' used to describe a genre may refer to the use of photography in conceptual art or in contemporary art photography. In either case, the term is not widely used or consistently applied.

== Conceptual photography and conceptual art ==
Conceptual art of the late 1960s and early 1970s often involved photography to document performances, ephemeral sculpture or actions. The artists did not describe themselves as photographers, for example Edward Ruscha said "Photography's just a playground for me. I'm not a photographer at all." These artists are sometimes referred to as conceptual photographers but those who used photography extensively such as John Hilliard and John Baldessari and Payam-e-Azadi are more often described as photoconceptualists or "artists using photography".

== Conceptual photography and fine-art photography ==
Since the 1970s artists using photography like Cindy Sherman and latterly Thomas Ruff and Thomas Demand have been described as conceptual. Although their work does not generally resemble the lo-fi aesthetic of 1960s conceptual art they may use certain methods in common such as documenting performance (Sherman), typological or serial imagery (Ruff) or the restaging of events (Demand). In fact the indebtedness to these and other approaches from conceptual art is so widespread in contemporary fine-art photography that almost any work might be described as conceptual. The term has perhaps been used most specifically in a negative sense to distinguish some contemporary art photography from documentary photography or photojournalism. This distinction has been made in the coverage of the Deutsche Börse Photography Prize. Conceptual photography is often used interchangeably with fine-art photography, and there has been some dispute about whether there is a difference between the two. However, the central school of thought is that conceptual photography is a type of fine-art photography. Fine art photography is inclusive of conceptual photography. While all conceptual photography is fine art, not all fine art is conceptual.

== Top Conceptual photographers ==
=== Thomas Ruff ===
The systematic deconstruction of photographic values within the practice of Thomas Ruff constitutes a major conceptual cornerstone in the analysis of the technical image and contemporary photography. Utilizing a highly rational Dusseldorf derived methodology, Ruff neutralizes expressive artistic expression to expose the camera as an ideological apparatus, programmed to generate specific modes of classification, indexing and institutional surveillance. His monumental 1980s series which presented uniform passport style, uninflected gazes on a grand scale, functions as a total refusal to expose the psychological interiority, or inherent truth of the sitter. Ruff demonstrates that the portrait functions primarily as an instrument of state identification and institutional ordering that structures modern knowledge, a conceptual stance encapsulated by the representative image of the clinical.

=== Sophie Calle ===
Within the framework of conceptual photography, French artist Sophie Calle positions the photographic medium not as a tool for spontaneous documentation, but as a rigid, rule-bound mechanism designed to structure lived experience. Her practice replaces subjective expression with clinical protocols, arbitrary constraints, and predetermined rituals that dictate the artwork's performance, combining detached indexical imagery with dry narrative texts to collapse the distance between performance and autobiography. Regarding this radical integration, she states: "The difference with many of my works is the fact that they are also my life. They happened." Her spatial installations investigate themes of absence and surveillance, shifting the focus from the autonomous object to the unstable exchange between the spectator and the residual trace. As noted by curator Marina Molarsky-Beck, this structural tension redefines the spectator's role: "The project reveals 'the mutually affirming but unstable relation between the beholder and the thing beheld,' suggesting that a work of art exists not only on the wall but in the shifting exchange between viewer and image."

=== Walead Beshty ===
Within the framework of conceptual photography, Walead Beshty investigates the material conditions of the technical image, transforming the photographic act into a forensic, process-based diagnostic. Rejecting illusionistic representation, Beshty replaces artistic interiority with a bureaucratic and technocratic vernacular, positioning the artwork as a material document embedded within global networks of surveillance and institutional labor. This strategy is prominent in his Transparencies series, produced by traveling with unexposed film intentionally subjected to airport X-ray scanners, an absolute literalism which he defines directly: "Choosing titles that are mundane, technocratic, and almost tautologically self-evident keeps the interpretive field open, emphasizing that things are things and it’s for an audience to put them to use." This deconstruction extends to his physical three-dimensional works, including his FedEx and Copper Surrogates series, which unprotectedly record the mechanical impacts and manual friction of corporate distribution networks, undermining the camouflaged concealment of institutional power: "I only try to not conceal the process, make it available... Power works by concealing how it functions, by enforcing a ritual, naturalizing it." Framing the medium around structural boundaries, Beshty treats the darkroom and the gallery as a relational ecology: "I tend to think of my work in terms of constraints, whether that be context, convention or material, and use their logics to generate the work."

=== Sherrie Levine ===
Within the framework of conceptual photography, American artist Sherrie Levine occupies the most radical paradigm of appropriation art, pushing the deconstructive logic of the post-photographic image to its absolute limit alongside peers such as Richard Prince. Emerging in the late 1970s as a central figure of the Pictures Generation, Levine executed a systematic sabotage of modernist authorial propriety through the technique of re-photography, reproducing iconic images directly from exhibition catalogues to turn the western artistic canon into an institutional field of contention that exposes how the traditional framework operates as an arena for the celebration of male desire. Levine highlights this intentional literalization of institutional influence: "It is something that artists do all the time unconsciously, working in the style of someone they consider a great master. I just wanted to make that relationship literal." Her strategic plagiarisms utilize mechanical doublings in a sterile sequence to manifest a material expression of what Jacques Derrida termed archive fever, where the repetitive drive becomes indissociable from a structural breakdown of memory. As evaluated by critic R.H. Lossin on the occasion of her retrospective Mayhem, this repetition inflicts a precise erasure upon the source: "Repetition and reproduction are in fact a means of maiming the object at hand. The doppelganger almost always kills the protagonist." Through this rigorous subtraction, Levine positions the photograph as a site of oblivion, a conceptual space cleared of historical sentimentality to force a self-conscious reading of the gaze itself: "I wanted to make pictures that contradicted themselves. I wanted to put one picture on top of another so that there were times when both pictures disappear and other times when they were both manifest. That vibration is basically what the work was about for me, that space in the middle where there is no picture, rather an emptiness, an oblivion."
