= Azimullah Khan =

Leader of the Indian Rebellion of 1857

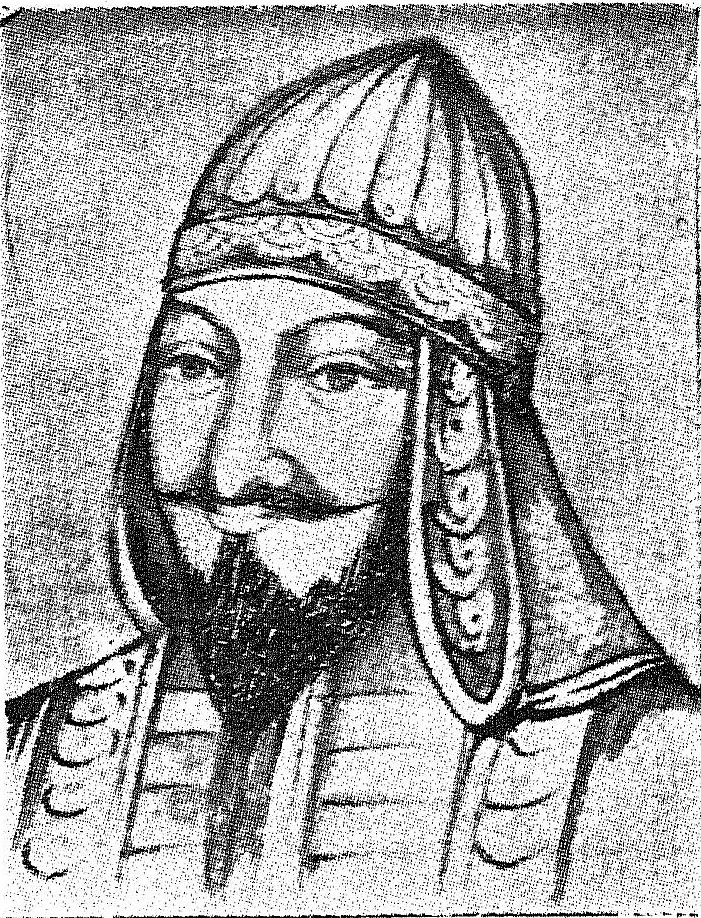
Portrait of Azimullah Khan (The Indian War Of Independence by Vinayak Damodar Sawarkar)

Azimullah Khan Yusufzai (17 September 1830 — 18 March 1859) also known as Dewan Azimullah Khan and Krantidoot, (Note: "Ambassador of Revolution") was the ideological leader of the Indian Rebellion of 1857. He was initially appointed Secretary, and later Prime Minister (hence the prefix Dewan) to Maratha Peshwa Nana Saheb II.

Azimullah Khan was involved in the Indian Rebellion of 1857, primarily ideologically, influencing important nobles such as Nana Saheb.

== Biography ==
Azimullah Khan’s full name was Azimullāh Khān Yūsufzaī. He lost his father as a child and was rescued as a starving Muslim boy from the famine of 1837–38 along with his mother when they were provided shelter at a mission in Kanpur. There he learnt English and French, which was an achievement for an Indian in the 19th century. After working as secretary to several British officers, he was taken into the service of the Maratha Peshwa Nana Saheb II, adopted son of the late Peshwa Baji Rao II, as secretary and advisor. Nana Sahib was involved in an extended appeal to the British East India Company to pass on to him the £80,000 annual pension that his adoptive father (exiled to the Bithor) had been granted. While Nana Sahib had inherited Peshwa Baji Rao's property and title, the pension paid by the Company had terminated on the latter's death. Nana Sahib chose Azimullah to lead a delegation to England in 1853 to plead his case with the Board of Control and the British Government.

In England, Azimullah was taken under the wing of Lucie, Lady Duff-Gordon; an intellectual and translator whose husband was a civil servant, court functionary and the cousin of the then Prime Minister. This introduction probably came about through the philosopher John Stuart Mill, who was an official of the East India Company and had been a childhood friend of Lucie's. Azimullah lodged with the Duff Gordons at their home in Esher, and in Lucie's company may have met her friends Dickens, Carlyle, Meredith, Tennyson, Browning and Thackeray (though there is no direct evidence). The mission to obtain resumption of the pension for Nana Sahib was unsuccessful and reportedly embittered Azimullah Khan.

On his way back, Azimullah's party stopped in Constantinople, which was then part of the Ottoman Empire. There he met with the Times correspondent William Howard Russell, who noted the young Muslim official's interest in the losses and setbacks suffered by the British Army. Azimullah is reported to have contacted Turkish and Russian spies. Although his mission had failed, he probably came back with a more dangerous idea, planting in the Nana Sahib's mind the seed of the Indian rebellion of 1857. (Azimullah also brought back a French printing press, which was used – by others – to print and distribute subversive literature against the British in India.)

Azimullah's own role in the great uprising that followed, the "Indian Mutiny", was political rather than military. Although he was chief advisor to the Nana Sahib, one of the principal leaders of the rebellion, he was a Muslim at a Hindu court, a talker, at a time when military men were needed, and without personal wealth, nobility, or a following of supporters, and so he soon became a marginal figure. He did however play a key role in the negotiations that terminated the Siege of Cawnpore. Representing Nana Sahib, Azimullah met with the British commander of the garrison Major-General Sir Hugh Wheeler and agreement was reached that the garrison and their families would be evacuated and taken by boat to safety in Allahabad. The following day he was seen among a group of Nana Sahib's advisers and officers who were present at the ambush and killing of most of the refugees as they boarded the waiting boats.

Azimullah Khan probably died of a fever in late 1859, after the crushing of the rebellion, on the run from the British in the inhospitable border country of the Nepalese Terai. Other accounts have him dying of smallpox while attempting to reach Calcutta in disguise, or of escaping India and eventually being murdered in Constantinople. Azimullah Avenue, a road in Kanpur is named in his honour.

== Legacy ==
What many consider India's first national song was made during the Rebellion, Payam-e-Azadi or ‘The Message of Freedom’ was written by Azimullah Khan and was published from Delhi in Urdu and Hindi. It ran as follows:

Hum haen iss ke malik, Hindoostan hamaaraa | Paak watan hae qaum kaa Jannat se bhee piyaaraa. [We are its owners, Hindustan is ours. It is our holy land, lovelier than paradise.]

Yeh hamaari milkiat Hindoostan hamaaraa | iss kee roohaniyat se roshan hae jug saaraa.[This is our property, Hindustan is ours. The whole world sparkles with its spiritualism.]

Kitnaa qadeem kitnaa naeem, sab duniyaa se niyaraa | kartee hae zarkhez jisse Gang-o-Juman kee dhaaraa. [It is old as well as comfortable, it is unique in the world. The Ganges and Yamuna irrigate its lands.]

Ooper barfeela parvat pehre-daar hamaaraa | Neeche sahil per bajta sagar kaa naqqaaraa. [The snow-clad mountains stand guard above us. The nose of the ocean reaches the shores below.]

Iss kee khanen ugal raheen sona, beera, paaraa | iss kee shaan shaukat kaa duniyaa maen jaikaaraa. [Its mines produce gold, silver and mercury. Its glory is renowned throughout the world.]

Aayaa Firangee door se, aisa mantar maaraa | loota donon hathoon se piyaaraa watan hamaaraa. [The foreigners came from far away, and played a trick. Our dear land was looted with both hands.]

Aaj shabidon ne tumko, ahl-e-watan lalkaaraa | Todo ghulamee kee zanjeeren barsan angaaraa. [Today you have been called on, my countrymen. Break the chains of slavery and spit fire.]

Hindoo-Mussalmaan Sikh hamaaraa bhai piyaaraa-piyaaraa | yeh hae azaadi kaa jhanda isse salaam hamaaraa. [Hindus, Muslims and Sikhs love each other as brothers. This is the flag of freedom, we salute it.]

== In popular culture ==
=== Films and television ===
In 2005 Bollywood Hindi movie Mangal Pandey: The Rising, directed by Ketan Mehta, the Character of Azimullah Khan was portrayed by Shahbaz Khan
