= Payam-e-Azadi =

British Indian Urdu, Hindi-language newspaper

- Type: Daily newspaper
- Format: Lithographic
- Owner: Azimullah Khan
- Editor-in-chief: Mirza Bedar Bakht
- Launched: 1857; 168 years ago
- Language: Urdu, Hindu, Marathi
- Headquarters: Delhi
- Country: British India

Payam-e-Azadi (Message of Freedom) was an Urdu and Hindi language daily newspaper published by Azimullah Khan and edited by Mirza Bedar Bakht, grandson of the last Mughal emperor Bahadur Shah Zafar. It first started publishing in February 1857 from Delhi and later appeared in Jhansi.

It is believed the newspaper played a significant role during the Indian Rebellion of 1857, the first revolt of independence against the rule of the British East India Company. Khan brought a printing press to India in 1854 when he went to London following the independence cause.

== History ==
The newspaper was established in February 1857 by Azimullah Khan. Its first Marathi language edition appeared in September 1857 from Jhansi. It was later banned by the government for its involvement in sedition, independence movement and writing on government policies, involving rebellion groups and articles. The copies of the publications are only available in the British Library, the national library of the UK.
