= Hazem Abdel-Azim =

Egyptian government opponent (born 1960)

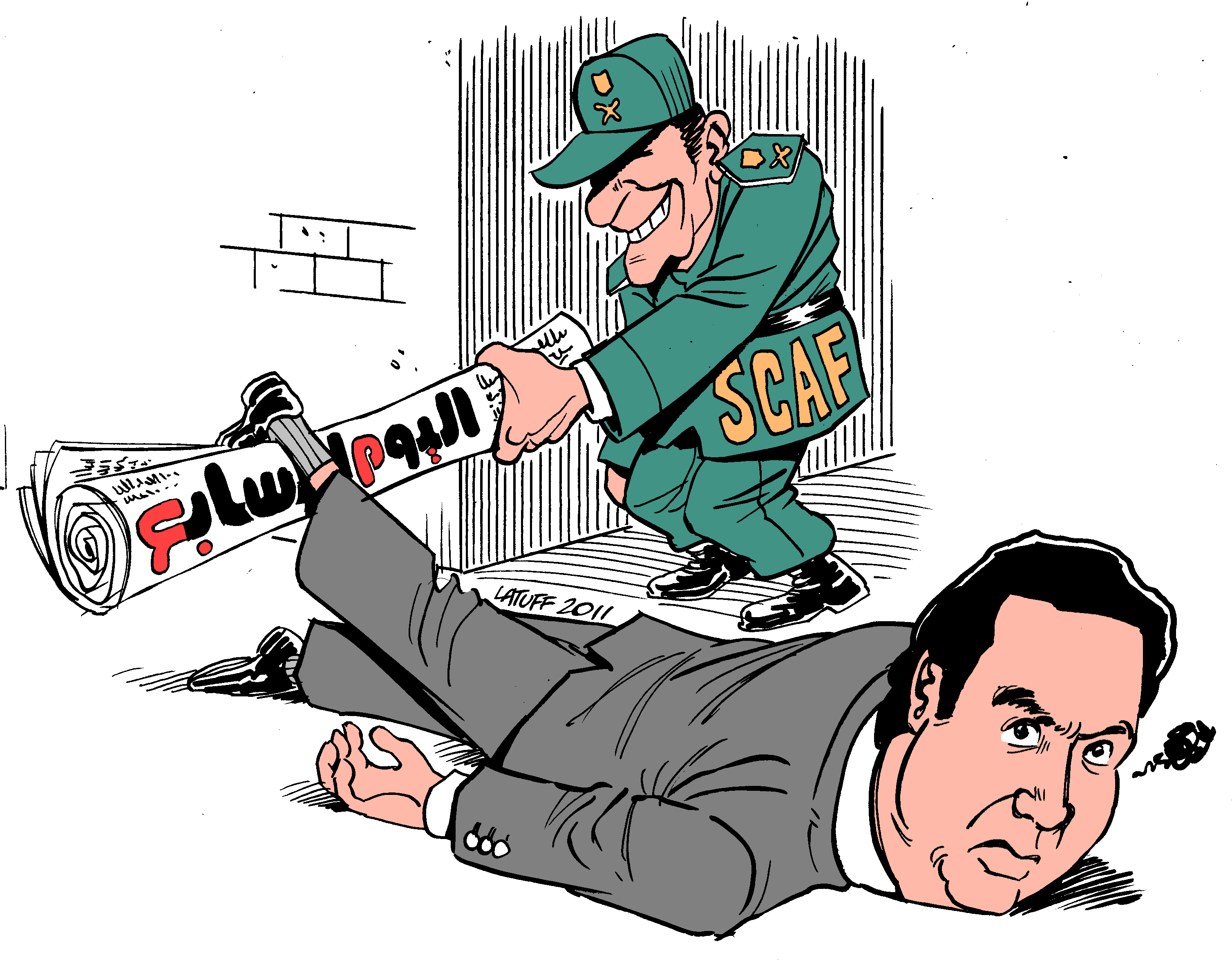
"SCAF low blow to Hazem Abdel Azim", by Carlos Latuff, 2011

Hazem Abdel-Azim (or Hazim Abdelazim) (Arabic: حازم عبد العظيم; born 1960) is a prominent Egyptian government opponent. In 2007, he was a senior adviser to the telecommunications minister under then-President Hosni Mubarak. He is known as an activist.
