= Azamat Sydykov =

Kyrgyz concert pianist (born 1986)

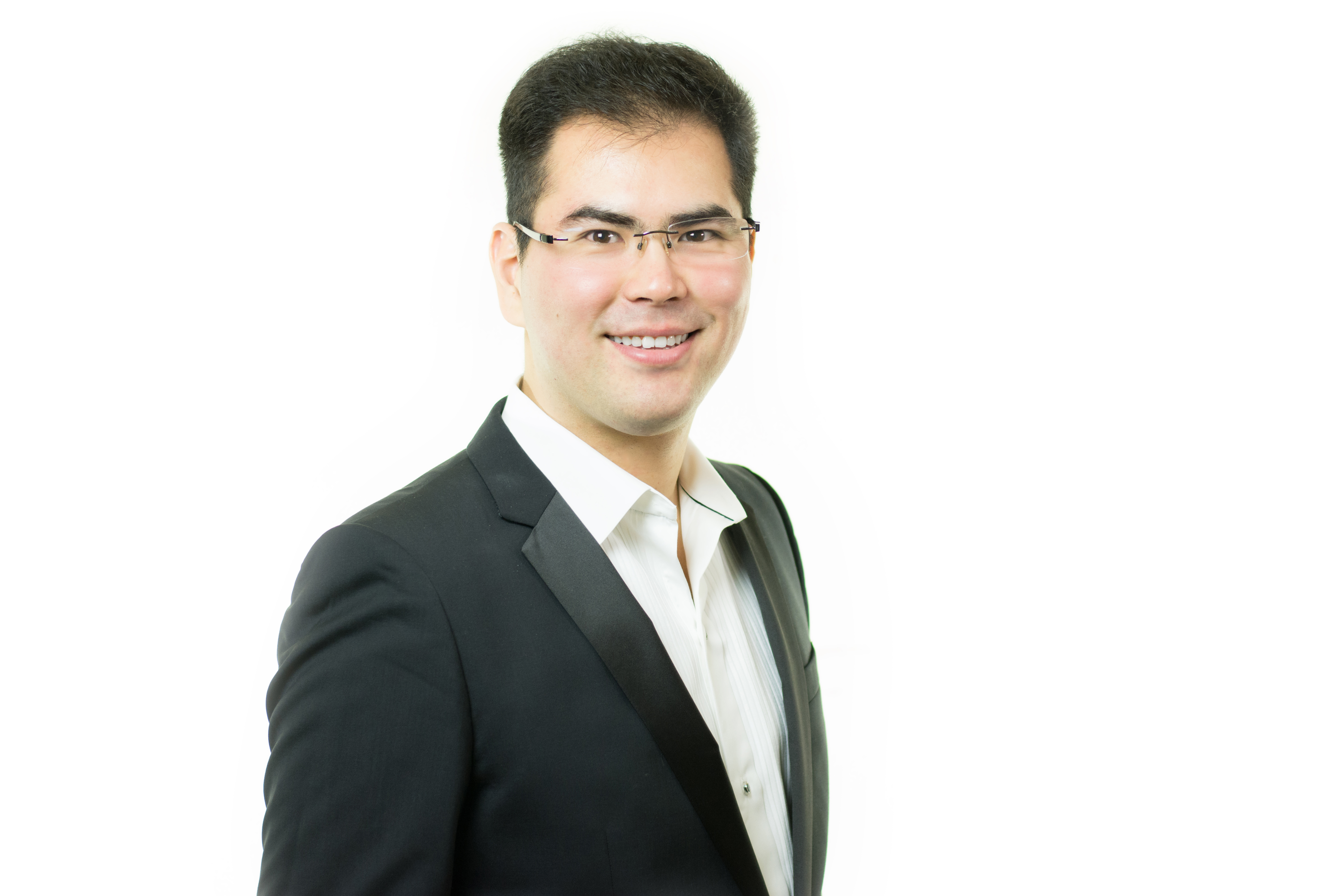
- Born: 1986 (age 39–40); Frunze, Kirghiz Soviet Socialist Republic, Soviet Union
- Occupation: Concert pianist

Azamat Sydykov (born 1986 in Frunze, Soviet Union) is a Kyrgyz concert pianist who has played solo concerts internationally through Kyrgyzstan, Russia, Switzerland, Germany, Iran, Turkey, Ukraine, Finland, Italy, and Netherlands. Having settled in New York City, Sydkov has there performed at Steinway Hall, Mannes Concert Hall, Gilder Lehrman Hall, Greenwich House, David Greer Recital Hall and United Nations Headquarters in New York.

== Sources ==
- McKerlie Luke, Andrea (October 4, 2014). "Azamat Sydykov Plays "Movie Tunes" to Open this Year's Clayton Piano Festival". Archived from the original on 2022-11-30.
- "The official website of The Carnegie Hall". Archived from the original on 2016-08-05.
- The official website of The Carnegie Hall
- Meet Azamat -Azamat Sydykov: The Carnegie Hall Debut, a promo video on artists YouTube channel
- Американская Мечта: Азамат Сыдыков, a documentary film by Nikolay Yarst and Philip Vasilenko
- Manasova, Kanykei. "Kyrgyz pianist Azamat Sydykov to perform at Carnegie Hall (USA)". Archived from the original on 2015-05-03.
- People of Kyrgyzstan: Azamat Sydykov, by V. Jamankulova, AKIPRESS news agency
- Азамат Сыдыков: "Важно извлечь уроки и двигаться дальше" by Yulia Konovalova, NEWS-ASIA.RU
- Азамат Сыдыков: У нас все получится! by Amirbek Azam Uulu, Radio "Azattyk", May 10, 2012
- Азамат Сыдыков: Катасыз ийгиликке жетпейсин!... by Amirbek Azam Uulu, Radio "Azattyk", April 23, 2012
- Азамат Сыдыков: Хочу, чтобы в Кыргызстане любили классическую музыку, by Anna Yalovkina, Vecherny Bishkek newspaper
