= Abd al-Azim al-Hasani =

Shia muhaddith

Abd al-Azim al-Hasani Arabic: عَبْد ٱلْعَظِيم ٱلْحَسَنِيّ
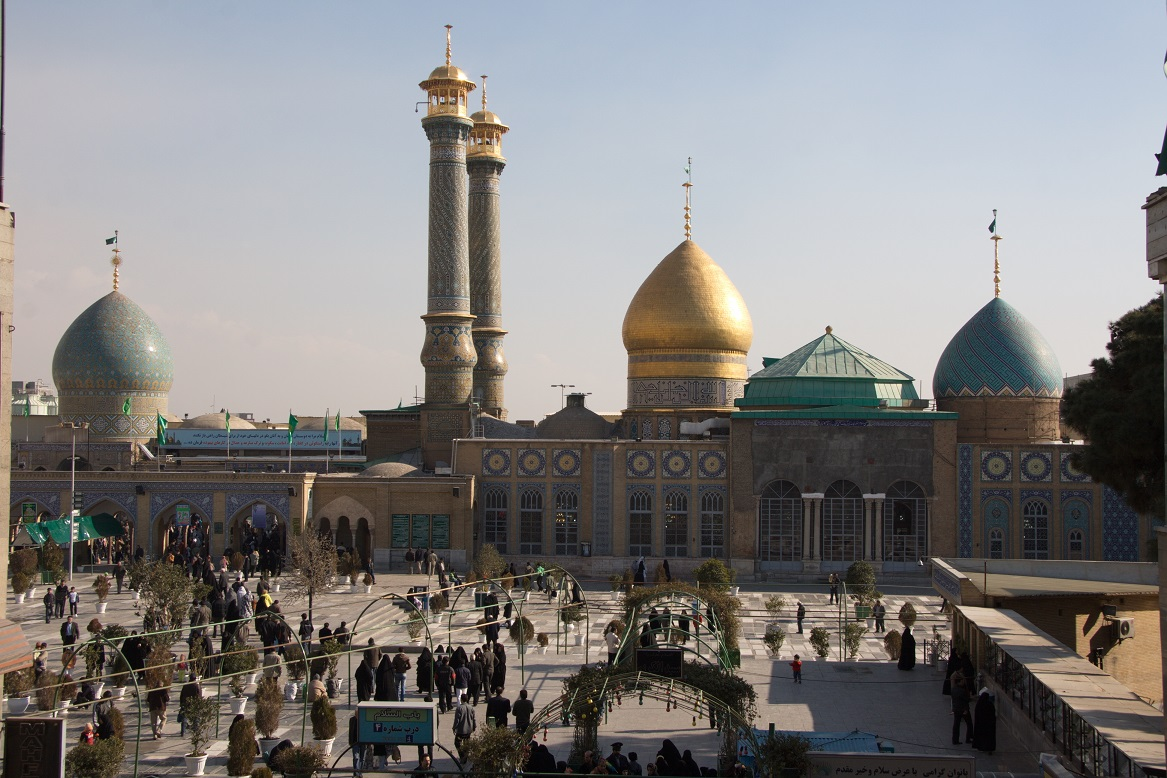
- The Shah Abd al-Azim Shrine

Personal life
- Born: 13 September 789 CE, Medina
- Died: 816 or 817 11 November 866 CE, Rey.
- Resting place: Shah Abdol-Azim Shrine

Religious life
- Religion: Islam
- Sect: Shia Islam

Abd al-Azim al-Hasani (Arabic: عَبْد ٱلْعَظِيم ٱلْحَسَنِيّ), also known as Shah Abd al-Azim, was a descendant of Hasan ibn Ali, the second Shia Imam. He is buried in the city of Rey, Tehran province, Iran, where the Shah Abd al-Azim Shrine is located.

Abd al-ʿAzim, born in 789 CE, was also a prominent figure among the companions of al-Hadi, the tenth Shia Imam. It is narrated from Abu Hammad al-Razi that Imam al-Hadi instructed people to refer their religious questions to ʿAbd al-ʿAzim. Abd al-ʿAzim also presented his beliefs to Imam al-Hadi, who affirmed and approved them.

Due to pressure from the Abbasid authorities, ʿAbd al-ʿAzim fled to Rey, where he lived discreetly in the house of one of the Shia. He devoted himself to worship and asceticism until he fell ill and died after a short time in 866 CE. The Shia of Rey held a grand funeral for him and later built a large shrine over his grave.

== Life ==
Abd al-Azim al-Hasani was born on Thursday, the 4th of Rabi' al-Thani 173 AH (13 September 789 CE), during the time of the seventh Shia Imam, Musa al-Kazim, in Medina. His father’s name was Abdullah and his mother’s name was Fatimah. His wife was Khadijah, the daughter of Qasim ibn Hasan ibn Zayd ibn Hasan al-Mujtaba (his paternal cousin), who is buried in Tehran, Iran, at Imamzadeh Qasem.

Abd al-Azim entered the city of Rey by the order of the Eighth Shia Imam, Reza, and lived in concealment in the basement of a Shia resident’s house. He fasted during the days and stood in prayer at night. Occasionally, he would secretly leave the house to visit a grave that is now located opposite his own shrine. After some time, he fell ill and died on Tuesday, the 15th of Shawwal 252 AH (11 November 866 CE), during the time of Imam al-Hadi and under the Abbasid Caliphate. He lived for 79 lunar years (77 solar years).

== Burial ==
The shrine of Shah Abdol-Azim Shrine is the burial place of Abd al-Azim al-Hasani. It is located in the city of Ray, south of Tehran. The monument dates back to the Ilkhanid, Safavid, and Qajar periods. It was officially registered as one of Iran’s National Heritage sites on January 31, 1956. The original structure of the shrine was significantly restored in the 9th century CE. The main northern entrance gate of the shrine was built by order of the rulers of the Buyid dynasty.

The lower section of the mausoleum has a square plan, each side measuring approximately eight meters. Above this square base—following the typical Seljuk architectural style—four squinches (arched transitional elements) were constructed at the corners. Above these, an octagonal structure was built, and on top of that, a sixteen-sided structure. The main dome of the shrine rises above this sixteen-sided base. The interior of all these sections is decorated with mirror work. Major renovations and modifications to this part were carried out during the reign of Safavid king Tahmasp I. The courtyards and iwans date back to the Safavid period. During the Qajar era, numerous repairs and additions were made. The golden covering of the dome was commissioned by Naser al-Din Shah Qajar in 1853.

== Genealogy ==
After the death of Abd al-Azim al-Hasani, when people intended to perform the ritual washing of his body, they found a piece of paper in his shirt on which his lineage was written as follows:

“I am Abu al-Qasim, Abd al-Azim ibn Abdullah ibn Ali ibn Hasan ibn Zayd ibn Hasan ibn Ali ibn Abi Talib.”

== See also ==
- Holiest sites in Islam (Shia)
- Ali Qazi Askar, the (new) appointed custodian of the shrine of "Abd al-Azim al-Hasani"
- Imamzadeh Ali ibn Jafar
- Hamza ibn Musa ibn Ja'far
