= Abdul Azim al-Deeb =

Egyptian Islamic scholar (1929–2010)

Abdul Azim al-Deeb (Arabic: عبد العظيم الديب; 1929 - 5 January 2010) was a professor at Qatar University.

Born in Gharbia, Egypt, he was educated in the Al-Azhar primary and secondary schools, and enrolled in the ranks of the Muslim Brotherhood. He studied with Sheikh Yusuf Qaradawi and then graduated from the Faculty of Dar El-Ulum, Cairo University. He received a master's degree on the study of the life of Imam Jouini and the effect of his work, and then received a doctorate degree with honors on the same subject.

He moved to Qatar in 1976, where he served as professor and head of the Department of Jurisprudence, Faculty of Sharia of the University of Qatar, His scientific writings on studying the Islamic heritage using scientific methods drew much attention. He continued to work on the heritage of Imam Jouini.

He compiled the jurisprudential masterpiece of Jouini, "Ghiyath al-Umam, Mughith al-Khalq, Nihaya al-Matlab fi Diraya al-Madhhab ("The End of the Quest in the Knowledge of the School"), an Encyclopedia of forty-four volumes with eleven thousand pages, which the scholar Sheikh Yusuf Qaradawi, president of the International Union for Muslim Scholars, described as of "meritorious service to the Islamic library."
