= Shah Abdol-Azim Shrine =

Mosque and mausoleum complex in Rey, Tehran, Iran

- شاه عبدالعظیم
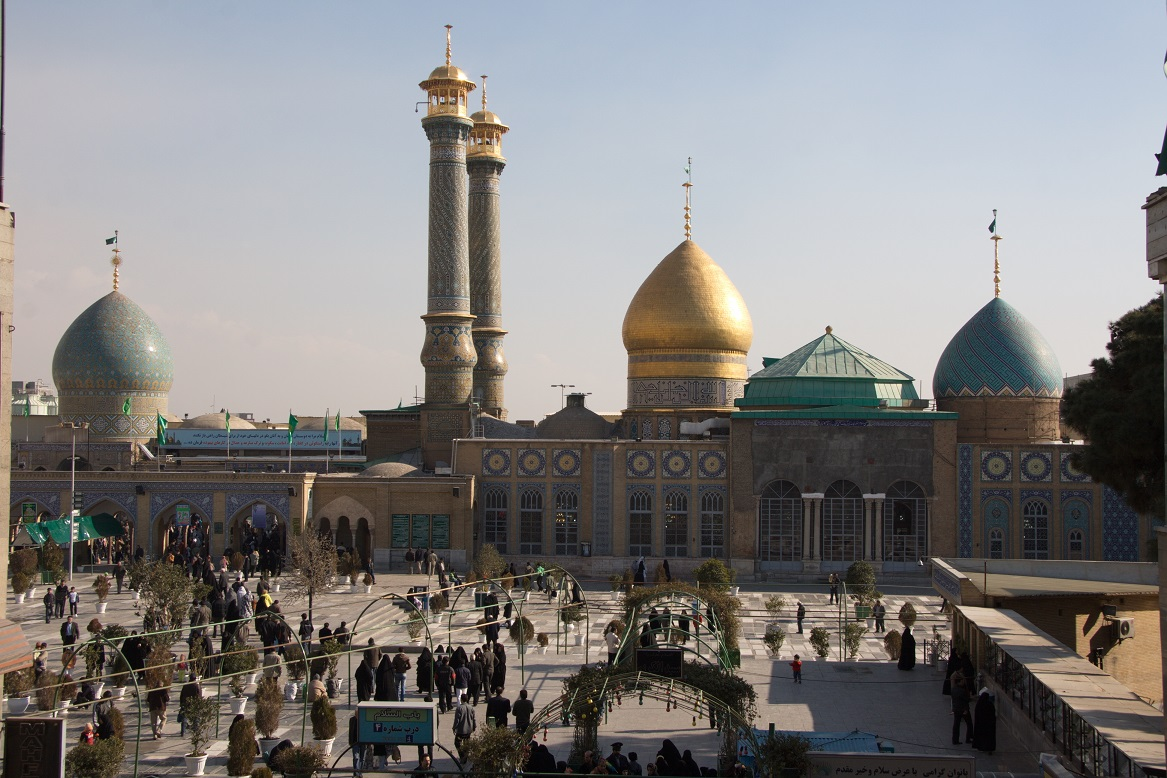

- Location of the funerary complex in Iran

Religion
- Affiliation: Shia Islam
- Ecclesiastical or organisational status: Shrine and mosque complex
- Status: Active

Location
- Location: Rey, Ray County, Tehran Province
- Country: Iran
- Interactive map of Shah Abdol-Azim Shrine
- Coordinates: 35°35′08″N 51°26′07″E

Architecture
- Type: Islamic architecture
- Style: Ilkhanid; Safavid; Qajar
- Completed: 9th century CE
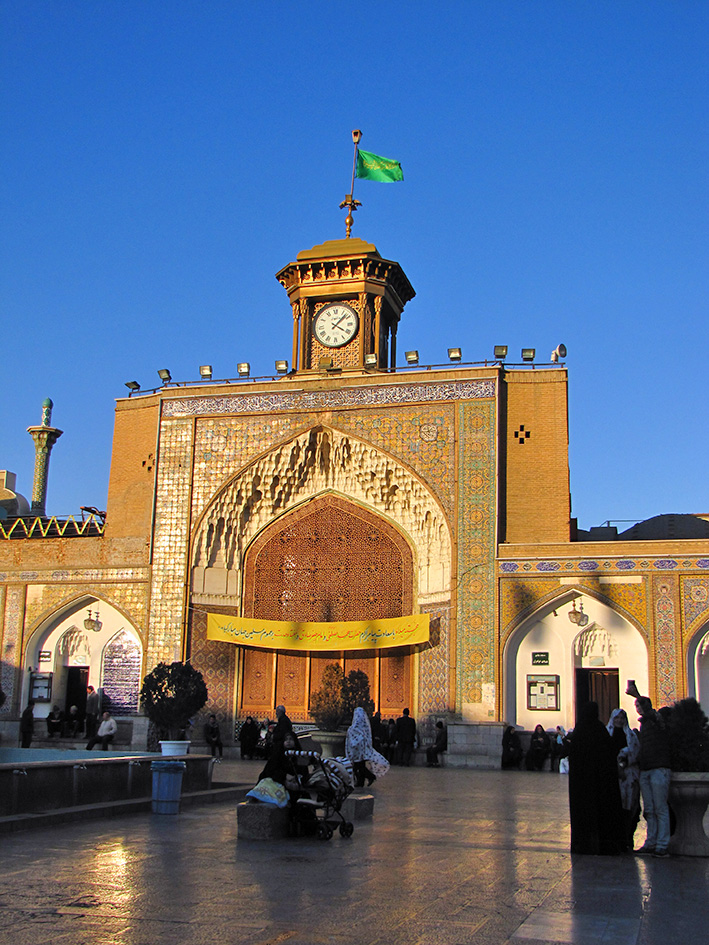
- Sahn and iwan portal

Iran National Heritage List
- Official name: Shāh Abdol-Azīm Shrine
- Type: Built
- Designated: 1942
- Reference no.: 406
- Conservation organization: Cultural Heritage, Handicrafts and Tourism Organization of Iran

The Shāh Abdol-Azim Shrine (Persian: شاه عبدالعظیم; Arabic: مرقد الشاه عبد العظيم الحسني) (Note: Also known as Shabdolazim, and the Shah Abdolazim Shrine.) is a Shia shrine and religious complex located in Rey, in the province of Tehran, Iran. The complex contains the tomb of Abd al-Azim al-Hasani, a descendant of the second Shia Imam Hasan. His lineage traces back to Imam al-Hasan al-Mujtaba (a). Al-Najashi reported that when he died and his body was prepared for washing, a note was found in his pocket containing his genealogy, which read: “I am Abu al-Qasim Abd al-Azim ibn Abd Allah ibn Ali ibn al-Hasan ibn Zayd ibn al-Hasan ibn Ali ibn Abi Talib (a).”

He was entombed here after his death in the 9th century CE.

Adjacent to the shrine, within the complex, are the mausoleums Tahir (son of the fourth Shia Imam - Sajjad) and Hamzeh (brother of the eighth Shia Imam - Reza).

The complex was added to the Iran National Heritage List in 1942, administered by the Cultural Heritage, Handicrafts and Tourism Organization of Iran. The complex is one of the holiest sites in Shia Islam.

== History and background ==
Ibn Qūlawayh al-Qummī (d. 978 CE) "includes the shrine in his Kāmil al-Ziyārāt, one of the earliest pilgrimage guides for the Shiʿa, which suggests that the tomb of ʿAbd al-Aẓīm was already of some importance by the tenth century." The tomb of Abdol-Azim had also come under the patronage of Sunni rulers at times, a notable example being the mausoleum constructed over Abdol-Azim's tomb in the 1090s CE by orders of the Seljuk vizier Majd al-Mulk Asʿad b. Muḥammad b. Mūsā. This door has an inscription in Thuluth script.

Abdol Azim migrated to Ray out of persecution and subsequently died there. A piece of paper was found in his pocket outlining his ancestry as being: ‘Abdul ‘Adhīm son of ‘Abdillāh son of ‘Alī son of Hasan son of Zayd son of Hasan ibn ‘Alī. Shah Abdol Azim was sent to Ray by Imam Reza.

== Notable burials ==
In addition to Abdol-Azim al-Hassani, the shrine is the burial site for many notable individuals, including members of the Qajar family, and many notable political figures, scholars, and clerics, from the Medieval period to contemporary times.

== Gallery ==
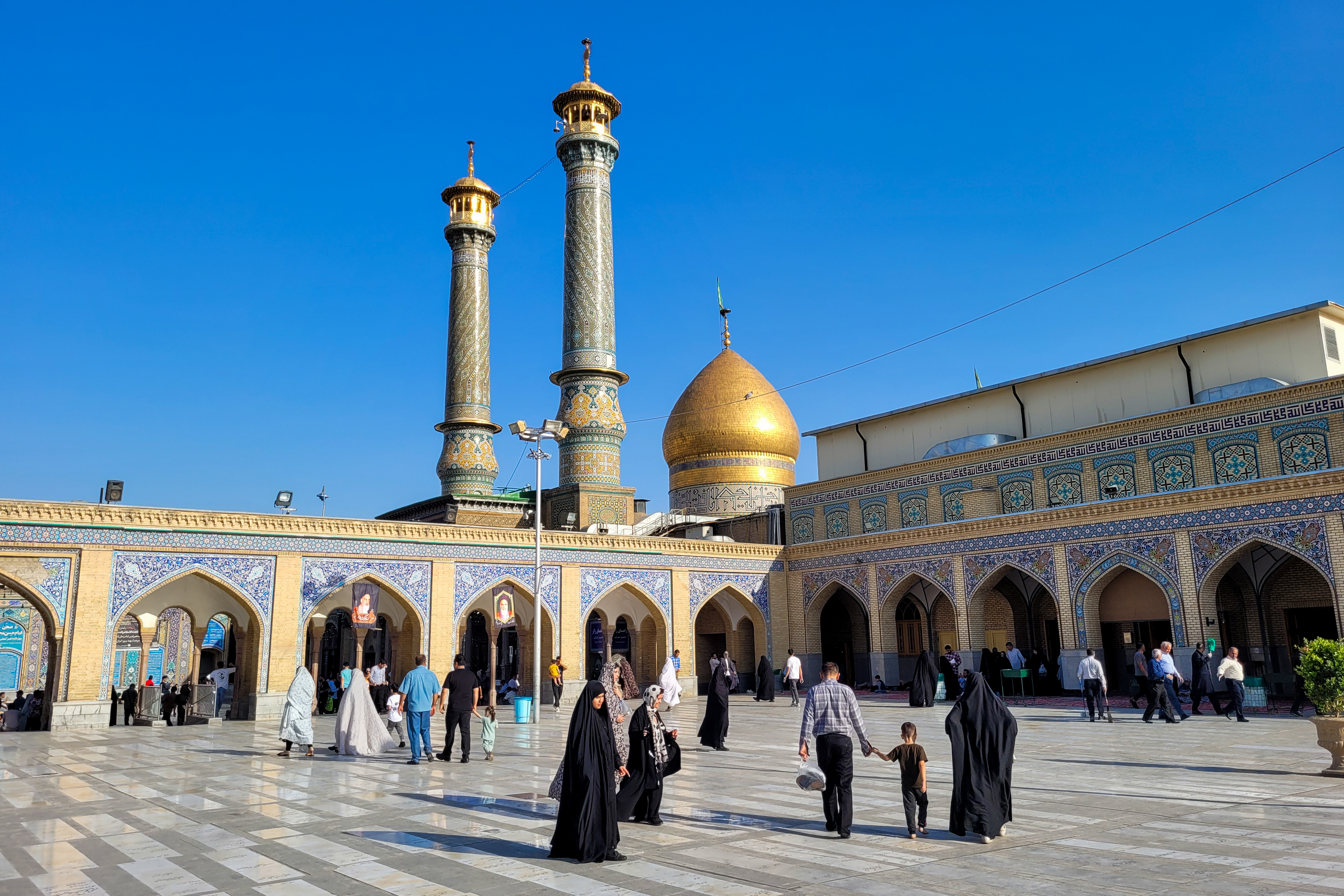

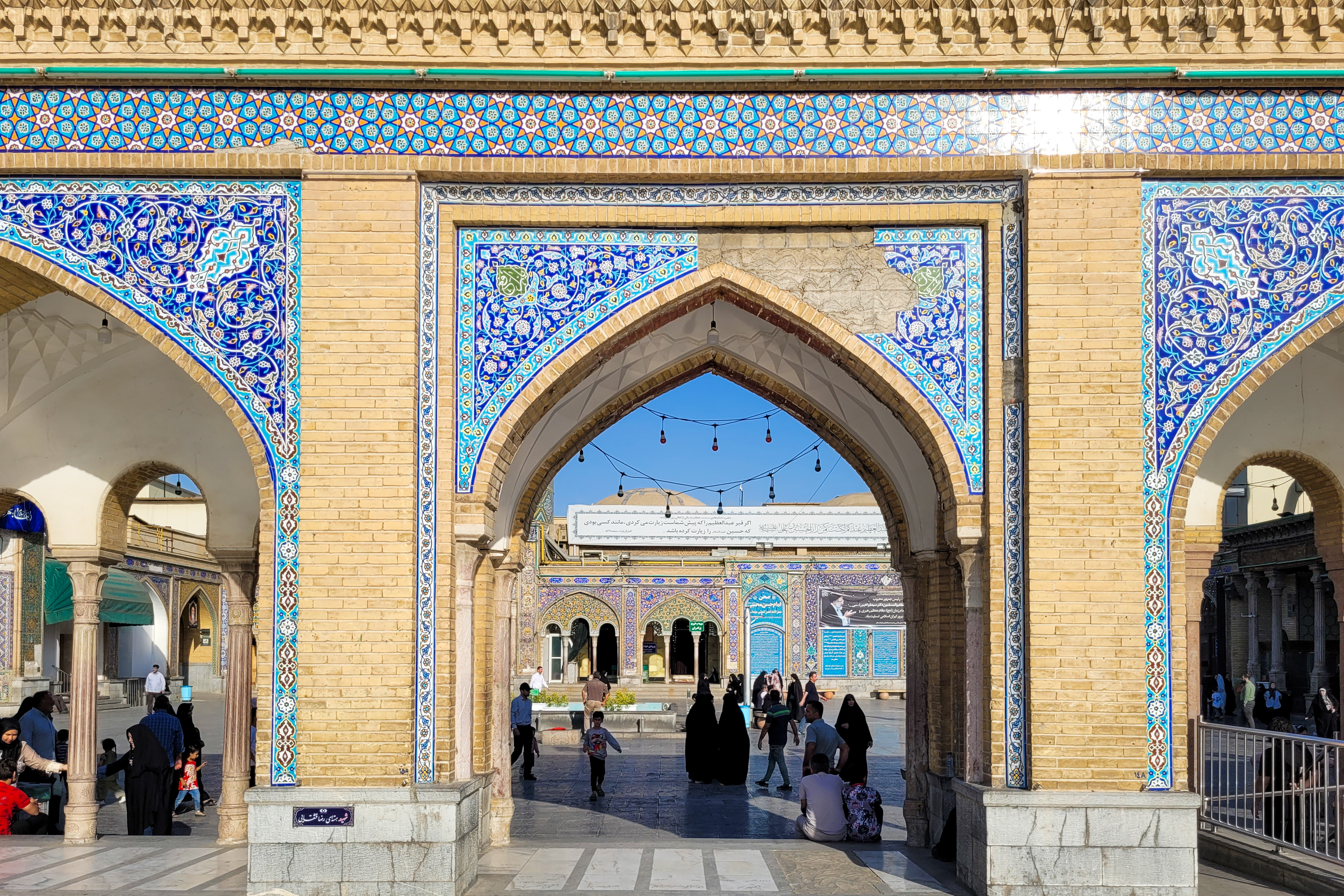

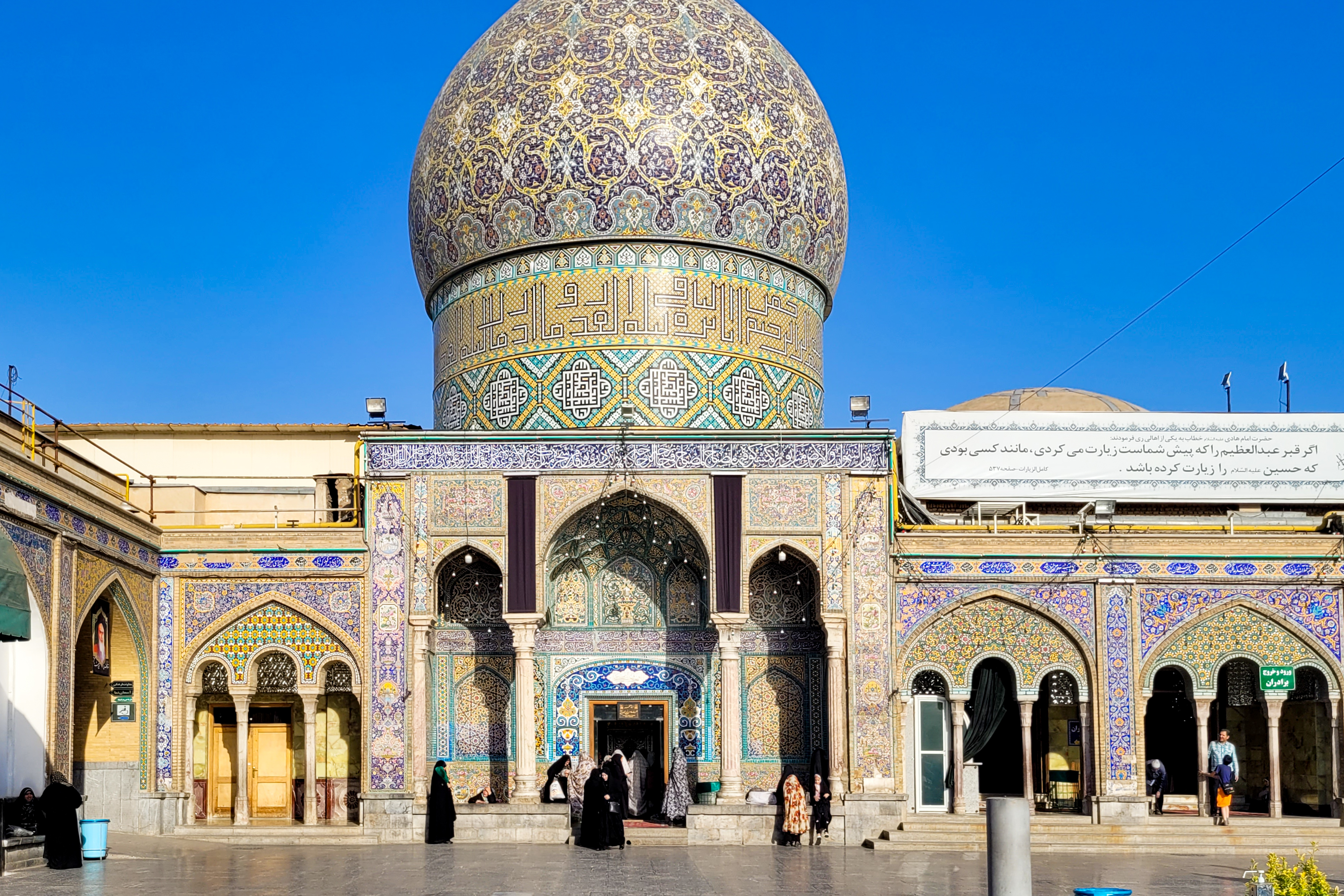

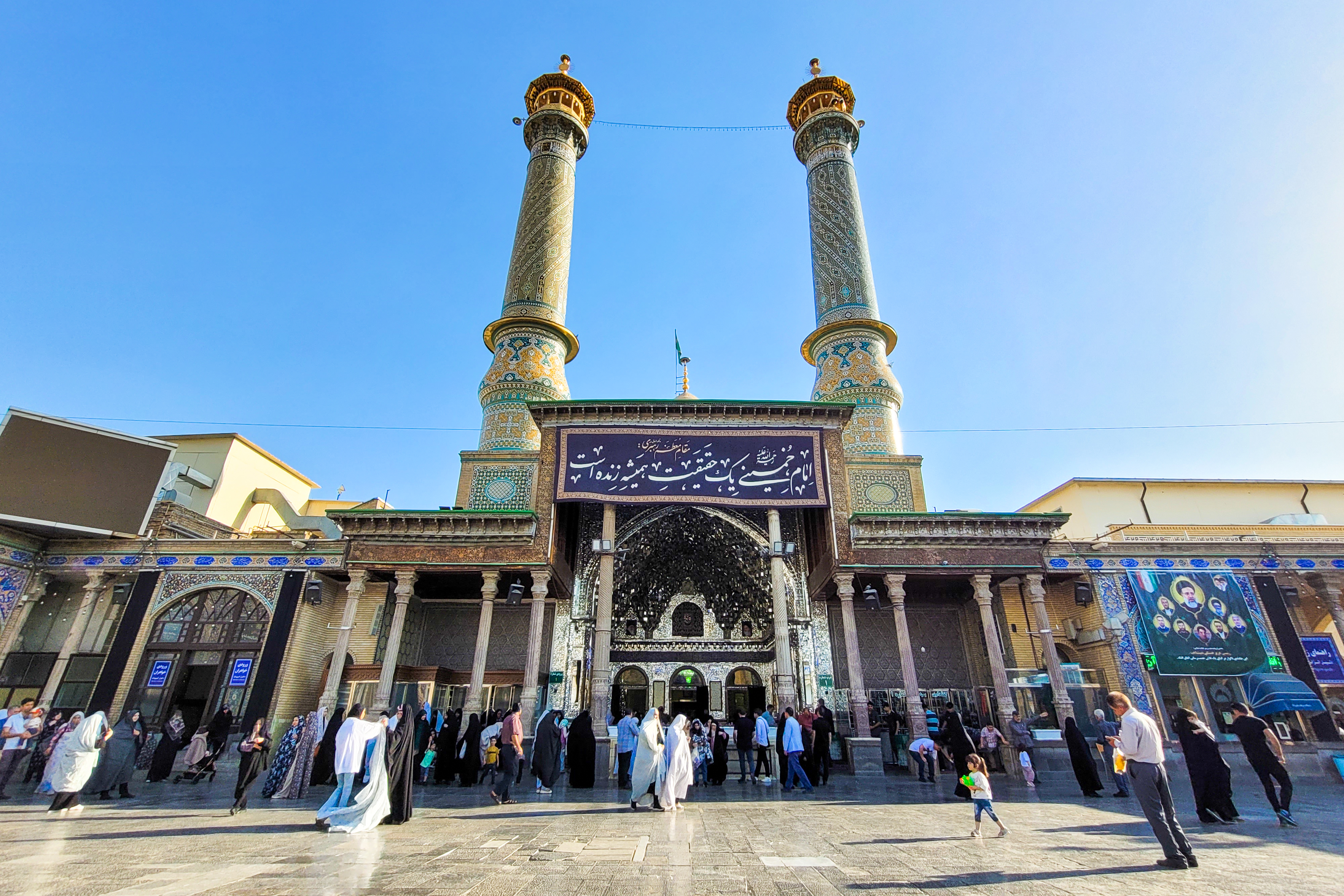

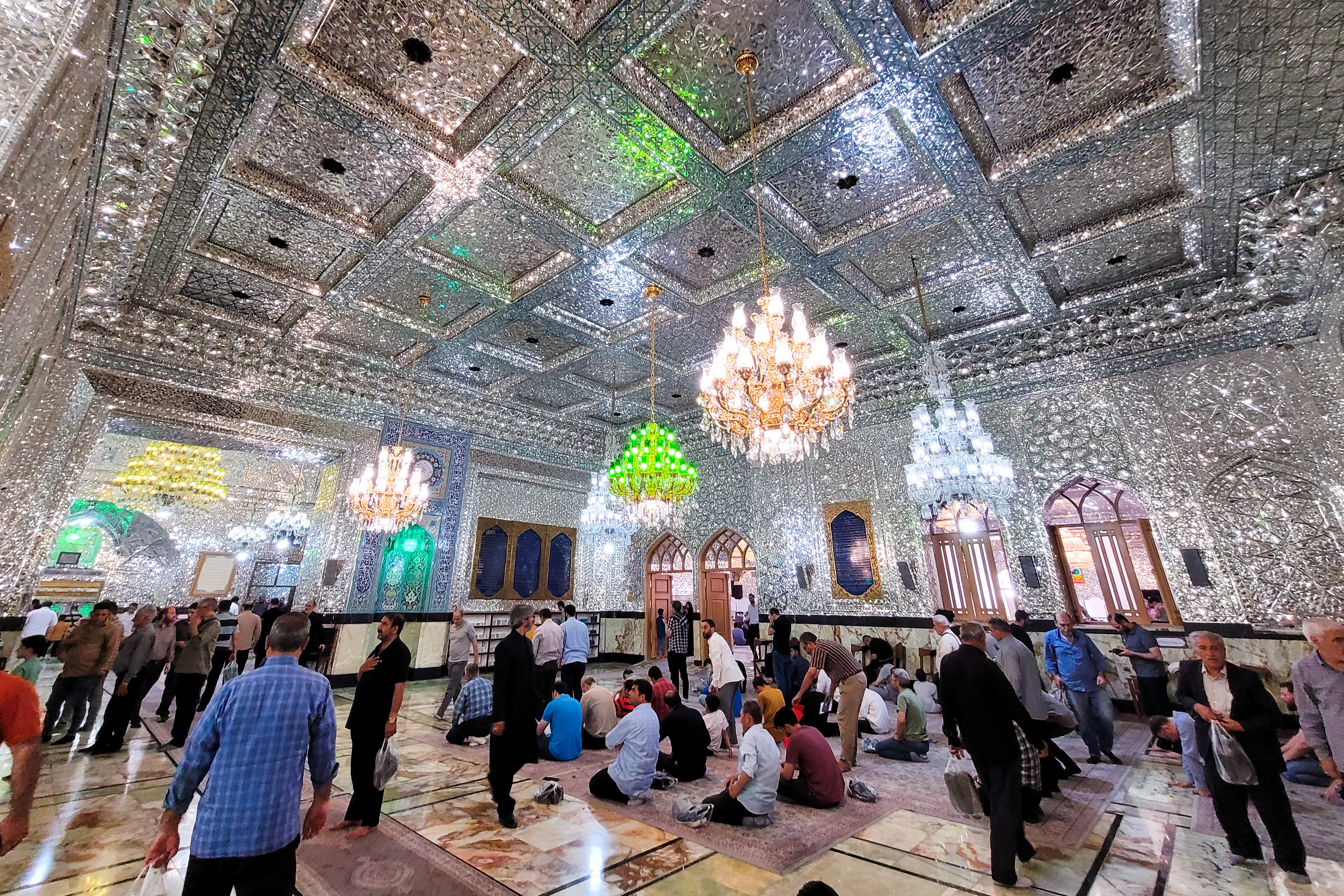

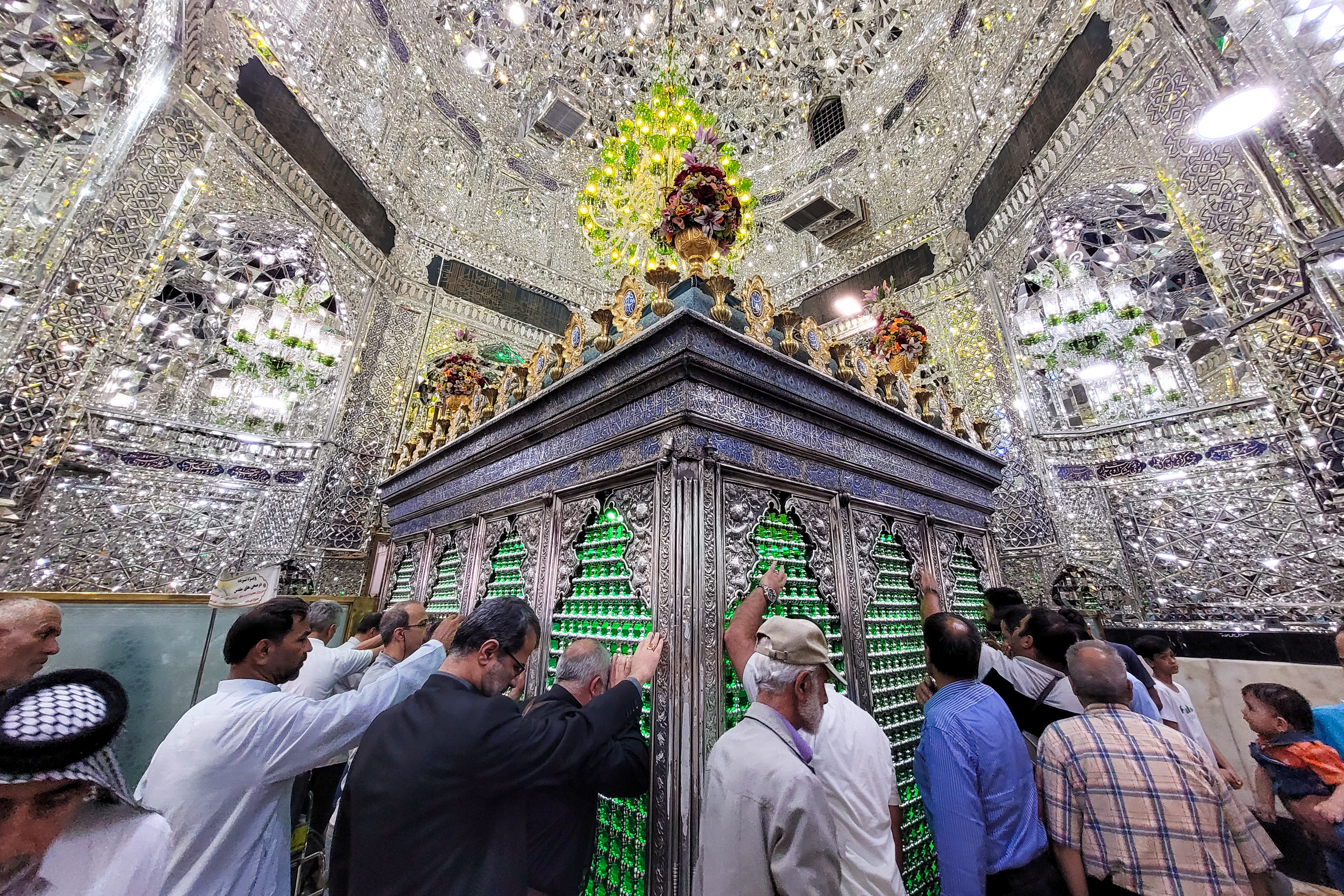

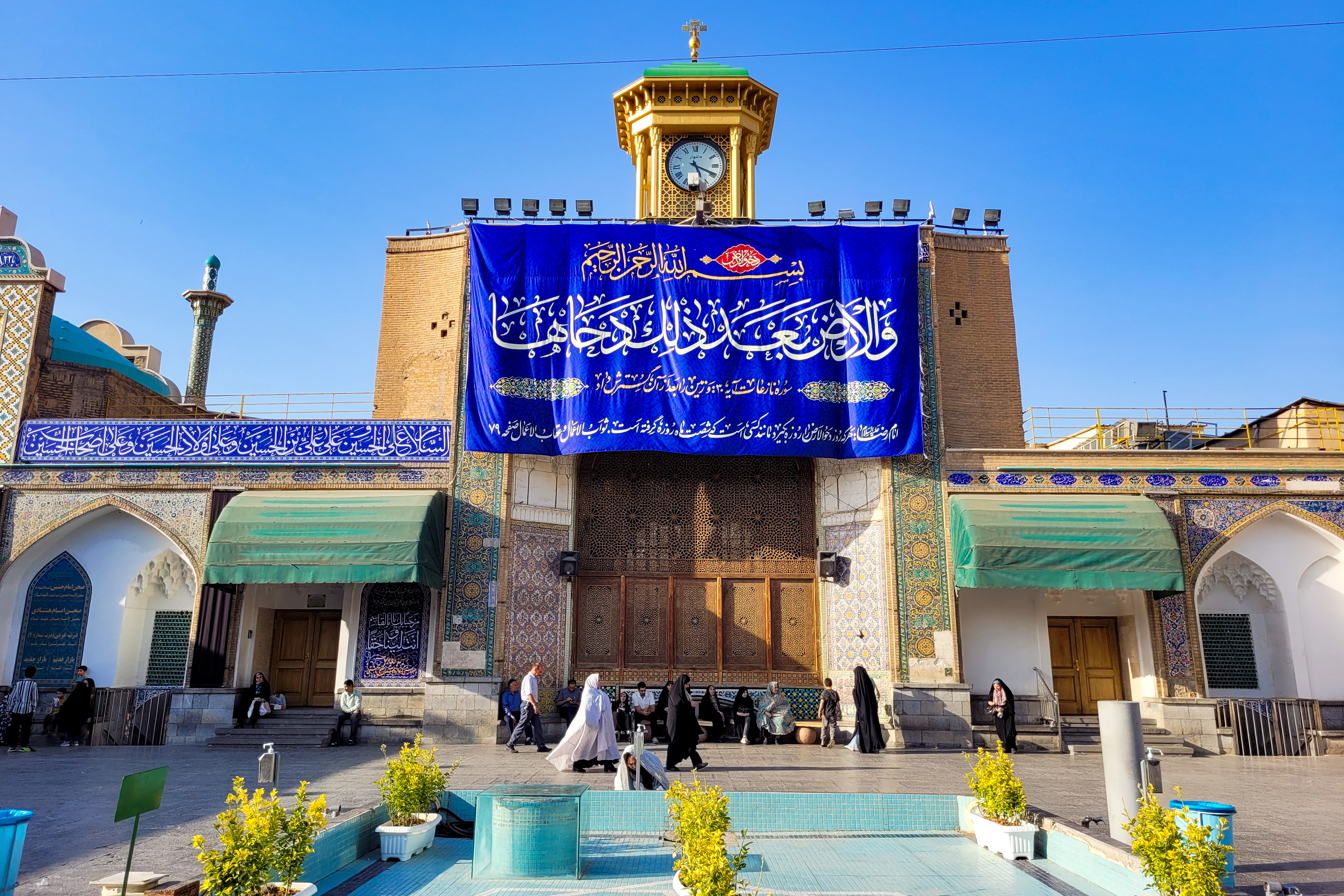

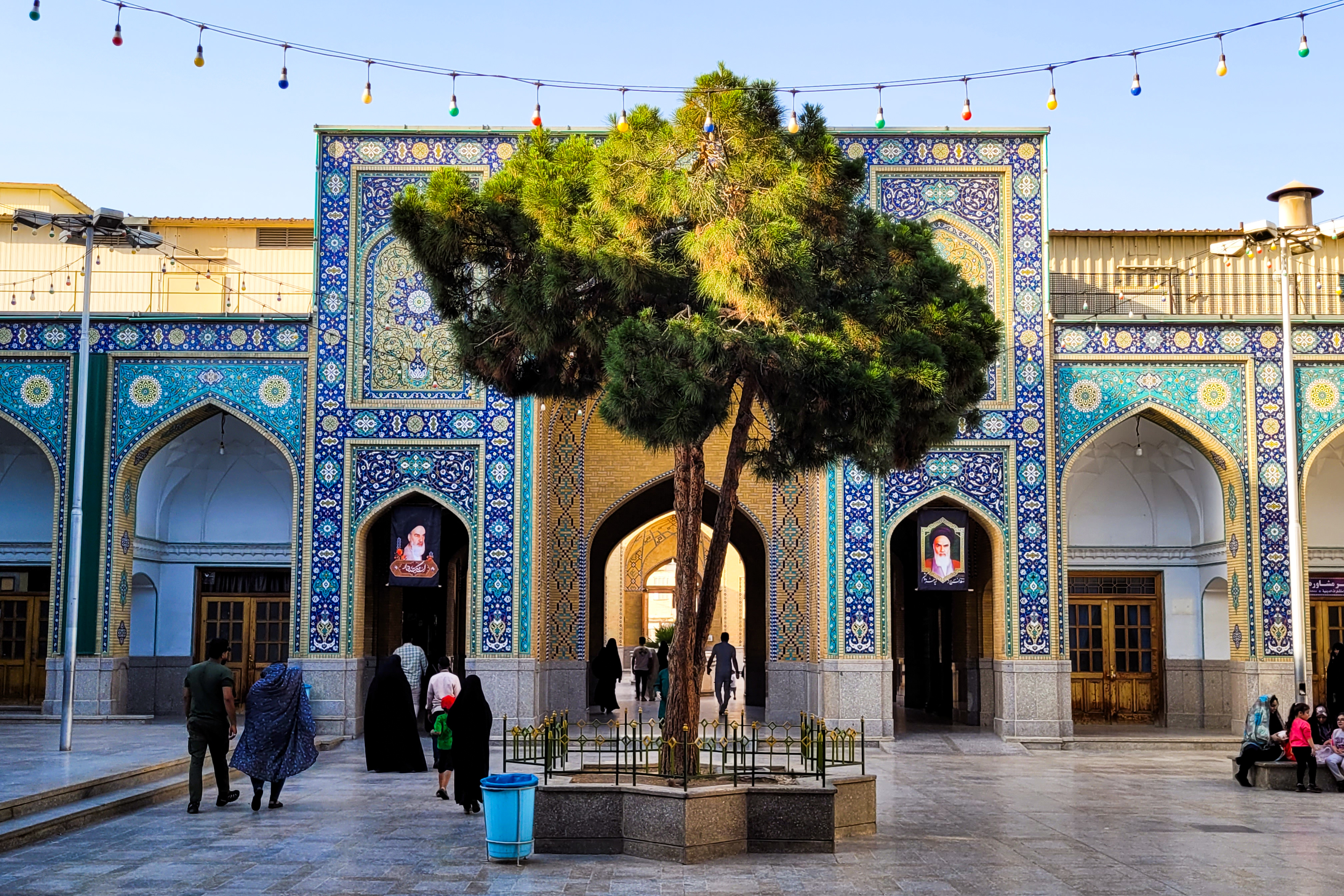

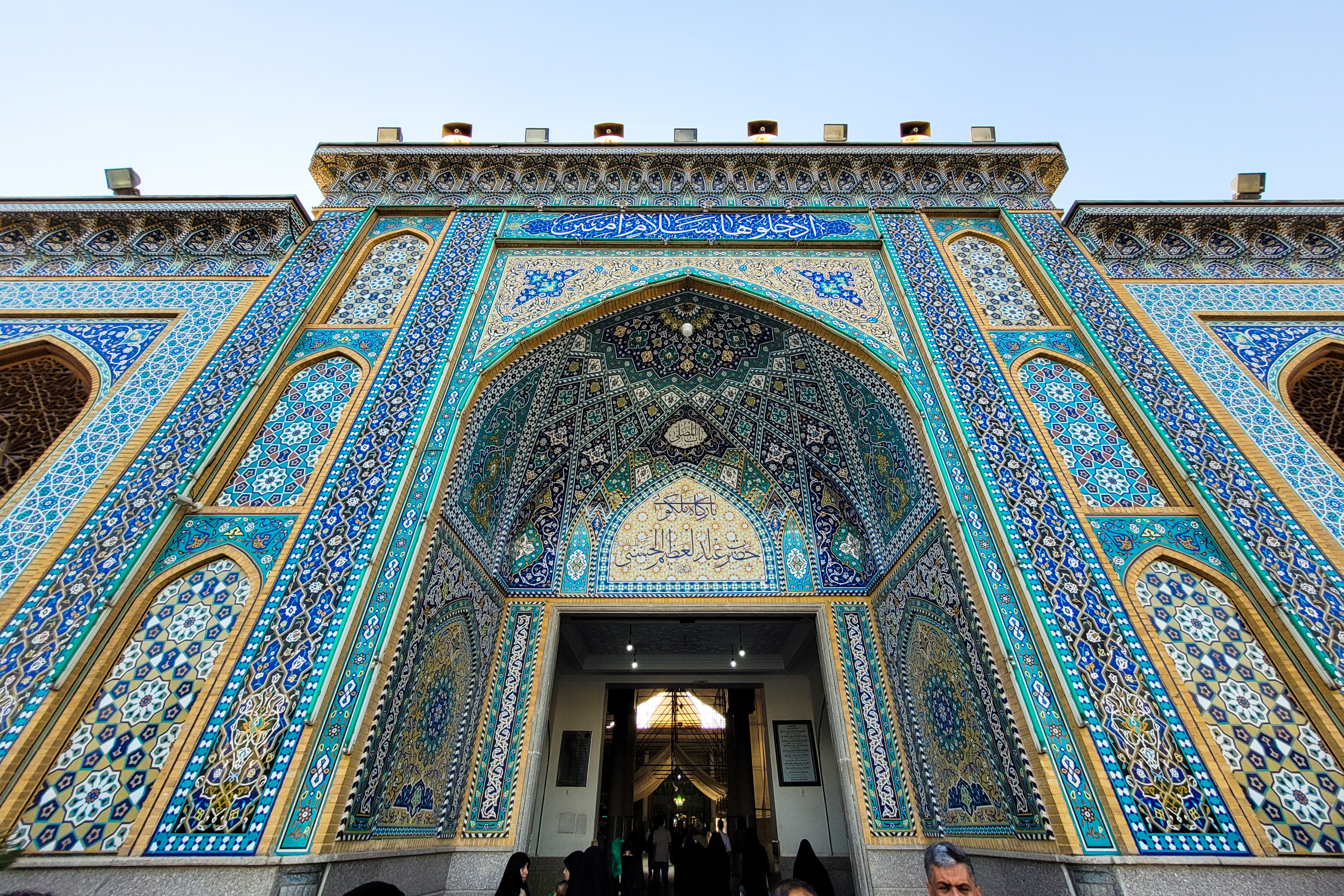

== See also ==
- Shia Islam in Iran
- List of imamzadehs in Iran
- List of mosques in Iran
- Holiest sites in Shia Islam
  - Tomb of Ali ibn Hamzah, Shiraz
  - Tomb of Seyed Alaeddin Husayn
