= Abdul-Adeem Karjimi =

Moroccan footballer

Abdul-Adeem Karjimi (Arabic: عبدالعظيم كرجمي) is a Moroccan footballer currently playing for Al-Nasr in the Omani League, previously playing there for four seasons.

== Club career ==
From 2011 to 2012 he played for Emirati club, Al Rams.

He played for Al Jahra SC, from 2010 to 2011.

In his current club Al-Nasr, where he previously played, for four seasons, and has received best player of the Omani League in 2007/2008. Throughout his career with Al-Nasr he has worn the number 7 shirt.
