= Ad-Din =

Arabic name suffix

Ad-Din (Arabic: الْدِّين ad-dīn [ædˈdiːn], "(of) the religion/faith/creed") is a suffix component of some Arabic names in the construct case, meaning 'the religion/faith/creed', e.g. Saif ad-Din (Arabic: سيف الدّين Sayf ad-Dīn, "Sword of the Faith"). Varieties are also used in non-Arabic names throughout the Islamic world, It is used as a family name-suffix by some royal Muslim families, including the imperial Seljuks, Walashmas, and Mughals.

It is used as a traditional naming pattern among many South Asian Muslim families of various origins. Many Hyderabadi Muslim families also use it, and many of Hyderabadis belong to the Urdu-speaking Muhajir ethnic group of Pakistan, including them.

The Arabic spelling in its standard transliteration is al-Din. Due to the phonological rules involving the "sun letters" (حرف الشّمسيّة hurfu ’sh-Shamsiyyah), the Arabic letter د (dāl) is an assimilated letter of the Arabic definite article ال (al). This leads to the variant phonetic transliteration ad-Din. The first noun of the compound must have the ending -u, which, according to the assimilation rules in Arabic (names in general are in the nominative case), assimilates the following a-, thus manifesting into ud-Din in Classical and Modern Standard Arabic. However, all modern Arabic vernaculars lack the noun endings. Thus, the vowel of the definite article in them is pronounced in full as either a or e (the latter mostly in Maghreb and Egypt; as well as in Albania, Azerbaijan, Bosnia and Herzegovina, Kosovo and Turkey). At the same time, the Arabic short vowel u is rendered as short o in Iranian Persian, thus od-din.

In practice, romanizations of Arabic names containing this element may vary greatly, including:

- al-Din, ad-Din, -addin, -adin
- el-Din, -eldin, -eddin
- ud-Din, -uddin, -uddeen (particularly in English-speaking South, Southeast and East Asia)
- -eddine (particularly in French-speaking areas)
- -ettin (particularly in Azerbaijani and Turkish names)
- -od-din (particularly in Iranian Persian names)
- Uddin, Uddeen (particularity in South Asia)

Examples of names including this element are:

- Aladdin
- Aftab al-Din
- Alimuddin
- Amin ud-Din
- Anwaruddin
- Asad ud-Din
- Awwal ud-Din
- Azharuddin
- Azim ud-Din
- Badr al-Din
- Baha' al-Din
- Burhan al-Din
- Fakhr al-Din
- Fariduddin
- Ghiyath al-Din
- Hamid al-Din
- Haqq ad-Din
- Hasan al-Din
- Hisham ud-Din
- Husam ad-Din
- Ikhtiyar al-Din
- Imad al-Din
- Ismat ad-Din
- Izz al-Din
- Jalal ad-Din
- Jamal ad-Din
- Kafil al-Din
- Kamal al-Din
- Khair ad-Din
- Majd ad-Din
- Mansur ad-Din
- Mizan ud-Din
- Mohy al-Din
- Mohyeddin
- Moinuddin
- Muhib ud-Din
- Mufiz-ud-Din
- Mu'in al-Din
- Mu'iz ad-Din
- Muslih ud-Din
- Najm al-Din
- Nasir al-Din
- Nazimuddin
- Nizam al-Din
- Nur al-Din
- Qamar ud-Din
- Qutb ad-Din
- Rashid al-Din
- Riazuddin
- Rukn al-Din
- Sa'd al-Din
- Sabr ad-Din
- Sadr al-Din
- Safi al-Din
- Saif al-Din
- Ṣalāḥ ad-Dīn
- Shams al-Din
- Sharaf al-Din
- Shihab al-Din
- Shujauddin
- Sirajuddin
- Taj al-Din
- Taqi al-Din
- Zahir al-Din
- Zamir al-Din
- Zayn ad-Din (or Zinedine)
- Ziauddin

== Use of Uddin as surname ==
In modern times in English-speaking environments, the name Uddin has sometimes been used as if it was a separate surname. An example is:

- Pola Uddin, Baroness Uddin (born 1959), British politician

== Use of Eddine as surname ==
- Ahmed Saad Eddine, Egyptian politician

== See also ==
- al-Dawla
- Adin
