= Majid (name) =

Arabic masculine given name

- Pronunciation: Arabic: [maːʤɪd] (ماجد); Arabic: [maʤiːd] (مجيد)
- Gender: Male

Origin
- Origin: Arabic
- Meaning: Noble, Glorious, Magnificent

Other names
- Alternative spelling: Majed, Majid, Maajed, Magid, Maged,
- Related names: Majeed; Amjad; Majd

Majid, Majed (also: Maajed, Maged, Magid or Mjid) (Arabic: ماجد, IPA: [maːʤed]) is a masculine Arabic given name, which may also appear as the surname Majid or Magid. The name Majid in Arabic means "noble", "glorious", or "magnificent", and can also mean "honor" or "generosity". In general, Majid in Arabic is something abundant. Notable people with the name include:

== Variant spellings ==
- In Arabic: ماجد (Majid), (Magid), (Mjid)
- In English: Majed, Majid, Maajed, Mjid
- In Turkish: Macit, Majid
- In Ottoman Turkish: ماجد (Majed)
- In Persian: ماجد (Majed), مجيد (Majid)
- In Russian: Маджид (Madzhid) or (Majed)
- In Bashkir: Мәжит (Majit)
- In Janalif: Məƶit
- In French: Madjid, Majid
- In German: Majid or Madschid
- In Korean: 마지드 (Majideu)
- In Japanese: マジッド (Majiddo)
- In Mandarin: 马吉德 (Mǎjídé)
- In Cantonese: 馬捷 (Maa5 Zit6)
- In Spanish: Majid
- In Hebrew: מג'יד (Majid)
- In Italian: Majid

== Given name ==
- Majid Abdolhosseini (born 1972), Iranian karateka
- Majid Adibzadeh (born 1980), Iranian writer
- Majid Aflaki (born 1973), Iranian taekwondo practitioner
- Majid Ahi (1886–1946), Iranian politician and diplomat
- Majid al-Sayid Ahmed, Syrian army lieutenant colonel
- Majid Akhshabi (born 1973), Iranian Santurist and Persian Pop singer
- Majid Ali (born 1994), Pakistani cricketer
- Majid Al-Ali (born 1987), Kuwaiti judoka
- Majid Aliyari (born 1996), Iranian footballer
- Majid Amidpour, Iranian engineer and academic
- Majid Ansari (born 1954), Iranian politician and cleric
- Majid Al Ansari (born 1987), Emirati filmmaker
- Majid Ariff (1937–2018), Singaporean footballer and coach
- Majid Arslan (1908–1983), Lebanese Druze leader
- Majid Askari (born 1991), Iranian weightlifter
- Majid Assadi, Iranian political prisoner
- Majid Ayoubi (born 1980), Iranian footballer and coach
- Majid Azami (born 1983), Iranian oil executive and businessman
- Majid Bagherinia (born 1959), Iranian football manager and coach
- Majid Barzegar (born 1973), Iranian film director, producer, screenwriter, and photographer
- Majid Behbudov (1873–1945), Azerbaijani khananda
- Majid Beheshti (born 1955), Iranian actor, film producer, and theater director
- Majid Bekkas (born 1957), Moroccan musician
- Majid Bishkar (born 1956), Iranian footballer
- Majid Derakhshani (born 1957), Iranian musician and composer
- Majid Ehsan, Pakistan Army general
- Majid Ehteshamzadeh (born 1956), Iranian table tennis player
- Majid Eidi (born 1996), Iranian footballer
- Majid Entezami (born 1948), Iranian composer, conductor, musician, and oboist.
- Majid Fakhry (1923–2021), Lebanese scholar of Islamic philosophy
- Majid Farahani, Iranian politician
- Majed Faraj (born 1963), Palestinian intelligence officer and politician
- Majid Farzin (born 1984), Iranian powerlifter
- Majid Jamali Fashi (1978–2012), Iranian martial artist
- Majid Al Futtaim (1934–2021), Emirati billionaire businessman
- Majid Ghannad (born 1954), Iranian television presenter, producer, and director
- Majid Gharizadeh, Iranian filmmaker
- Majid Ghassemi (born 1952), Iranian banker, business magnate, and investor
- Majid Gheisari (born 1966), Iranian writer and novelist
- Majid Gholami (born 1985), Iranian footballer
- Majid Gholamnejad (1983–2018), Iranian footballer
- Majid Habibi (born 1981), Iranian voice actor
- Majid Halvaei (born 1948), Iranian footballer
- Majid Haq (born 1983), Scottish cricketer
- Majid-ul-Haq (1926–2013), Bangladeshi army officer and politician
- Majid Hassanizadeh (born 1952), Iranian-Dutch engineer and academic
- Majid Heidari (born 1982), Iranian football player
- Majid Momhed-Heravi (born 1952), Iranian chemist
- Majid Al-Hogail, Saudi politician
- Majid Hosseini (born 1996), Iranian footballer
- Majid Hosseinipour (born 1967), Iranian football player
- Majid Husain (1940–2019), Indian geographer
- Majid Jafar (born 1976), Emirati businessman
- Majid Jahandideh (born 1968), Iranian wrestler
- Majid Jahangir (1949–2023), Pakistani comic actor
- Majid Jahanpour (born 1948), Iranian football player and coach
- Majid Jalali (born 1956), Iranian football manager and player
- Majid Ali Jaunpuri (died 1935), Indian Sunni Islamic scholar
- Majid Jowhari (born 1960), Iranian-Canadian politician
- Majid Kalakani (1939–1980), Afghan communist politician
- Majid Karimov (born 1958), Azerbaijan petrochemical engineer and politician
- Majid Kavian (1982–2011), Iranian-Kurdish militant
- Majid Kavousifar (1978/79–2007), Iranian murderer
- Majid Khadduri (1909–2007), Iraqi academic
- Majid Khademi (died 2026), Iranian major general
- Majid Al-Khamis, Kuwaiti handball player
- Majid Khan (disambiguation), multiple people
- Majid Khodabakhsh (born 1956), Iranian politician
- Majid Khodabandelou (born 1986), Iranian footballer
- Majid Khodaei (born 1978), Iranian wrestler
- Majid KhosraviNik, British academic
- Majid Kiani, Persian musician
- Majid Latifi (born 1981), Iranian futsal player
- Majid Maayouf (born 1961), Qatari football player
- Majid Salek Mahmoudi (1953–1986), Iranian serial killer
- Majid Majeed (born 1983), Pakistani cricketer
- Majid Al-Majid (1966–2018), Saudi folk singer
- Majid Majidi (born 1959), Iranian filmmaker and producer
- Majid bin Mohammed Al Maktoum (born 1987), Emirati royal
- Majid Hani Al Maskati (born 1990), Canadian-Bahraini R&B singer
- Majid Michel (born 1980), Ghanaian actor, model, television personality, evangelist, and humanitarian
- Majid Mohammadi (born 1960), Iranian-American author
- Majid Al Mohandis (born 1971), Iraqi Saudi singer and composer
- Majid Motalebi (born 1979), Iranian producer and executive producer
- Majid Namjoo-Motlagh (born 1966), Iranian football player and manager
- Majid Mousavi (born 1965), Iranian military commander
- Majid Movaghar (1898–1968), Persian politician
- Majid Mowlania (born 1980), Iranian music composer
- Majid Fandi Al-Mubaraki, Iraqi-Australian writer and researcher
- Majid Musisi (1967–2005), Ugandan footballer
- Majid Naficy (born 1952), Iranian-American poet
- Majid Naini (born 1963), Iranian scholar and speaker
- Majid Namjoo (born 1963), Iranian politician
- Majid al-Nasrawi (born 1966), Iraqi politician
- Majid Nasseri (born 1968), Iranian cyclist
- Majid Naseri Nejad (born 1967), Iranian politician
- Majid Noormohammadi (born 1978), Iranian football player
- Majid bin Abdullah Al Qasabi (born 1960), Saudi politician
- Majid Qodiri (1886–1938), Uzbek literary scholar, public figure, and publicist
- Majid Rabah (born 1980), French footballer
- Majid Rafiei (born 1981), Iranian cultural manager and journalist
- Majid Rahimian (born 1997), Iranian basketball player
- Majid Rahnema (1924–2015), Iranian politician and diplomat
- Majid Rashid (born 2000), Emirati footballer
- Majid Rasulov (1916–1993), Soviet-Azerbaijani mathematician and academician
- Majid Takht-Ravanchi (born 1958), Iranian diplomat
- Majid Razavi (born 1997), Iranian pop music singer, songwriter, and composer
- Majid Ebn-e-Reza (born 1964), Iranian military officer and politician
- Majid Rezaei, Iranian footballer
- Majid Saeedi (born 1974), Iranian documentary photographer
- Majid bin Said (1834–1870), Sultan of Zanzibar
- Majid Saleh (born 1966), Iranian football player
- Majid Salehi (born 1975), Iranian actor, screenwriter, and producer
- Majid Samii (born 1937), Iranian neurosurgeon
- Majid bin Abdulaziz Al Saud (1938–2003), Saudi royal and businessman
- Majid Shahriari (1966–2010), Iranian nuclear scientist and physicist
- Majid Sharif (1951–1998), Iranian translator and journalist
- Majid al-Shibl (1935–2016), Saudi announcer
- Majid Soltanpour (born 1999), Iranian footballer
- Majid Tavakoli (born 1986), Iranian student leader, human rights activist, and political prisoner
- Majid Tikdarinejad (born 1982), Iranian futsal player
- Majid Torkan (born 1964), Iranian freestyle wrestler
- Majid Usman (born 1953), Pakistani cricketer
- Majid Sharif-Vaghefi (1949–1975), Iranian dissident
- Majid Vahid (born 2000), Iranian kurash and judoka
- Majid Vasheghani (born 1980), Iranian actor
- Majid Zahoor (born 1972), Pakistani politician
- Majid Zamani, Iranian political activist and entrepreneur
- Majed Moqed (1977-2001) Saudi terrorist

== See also ==
- Majid (disambiguation)
- Obax Majid (Lightbright), a Marvel Comics character
