= Saif =

Saif, Seif, Sayf or Seife (Arabic: سيف, Amharic: ሰይፍ) is a word in the Semitic languages meaning 'sword', and as a name, 'fighter' or 'protector [of something]'. Cognates are Classical Syriac: ܣܝܦܐ (Sayfa/Sayfo), Hebrew: סַיִף (sáyip̄), Imperial Aramaic: סַיְפָּא (saypā), and likely Ancient Egyptian (Coptic: ⲥⲏϥⲉ) sēfe. It may also refer to:

== Science and technology ==
- HL7 Services Aware Interoperability Framework
- Seif dune, a type of sand dune
- Spatial Archive and Interchange Format

== Organizations ==
- Shanghai Advanced Institute of Finance
- Social Enterprise Investment Fund
- State Accident Insurance Fund

== Name ==
=== Given name ===
- Sayf Ar'ed, Emperor of Ethiopia and antagonist of the Sirat Sayf ibn Dhi-Yazan
- Abdul Rahman Saif Al Ghurair, Emirati businessman
- Ahmed Saif Zaal Abu Muhair, Emirati paralympic athlete
- Akmal Saif Chatha (born 1973), Pakistani politician
- Jassim Saif Al Sulaiti, Qatari politician
- M. Saif Islam, Bangladeshi-American engineer and academic
- Malik Saif ul Malook Khokhar (born 1967), Pakistani politician
- Muhammed Seif Khatib (1951–2021), Tanzanian politician
- Omar Saif Ghobash (born 1971), Emirati politician
- Ramadhan Seif Kajembe (1944–2020), Kenyan politician
- Rashid Seif Suleiman (born 1954), Tanzanian politician
- Said Saif Asaad (born 1979), Bulgarian-Qatari weightlifter
- Sameh Seif El-Yazal (1946–2016), Egyptian military officer and politician
- Seif Adnan Kanaan (died 2004), Iraqi citizen who was abducted and beheaded
- Saif Ahmad, Bangladeshi-American restaurateur and World Series of Poker champion
- Saif Ahmad (cricketer) (born 1998), Danish cricketer
- Saif Ahmad Al Ghurair (1924–2019), Emirati businessman
- Saif al-Adel (born 1960/1963), Egyptian al-Qaeda member
- Saif Al Hashan (born 1990), Kuwaiti footballer
- Saif Ali (born 1997), Pakistani cricketer
- Seif Ali Iddi (born 1942), Tanzanian politician
- Saif Ali Janjua (1922–1948), Pakistani military officer
- Saif Ali Khan (born 1970), Bollywood actor
- Saif Al-Mohannadi (born 1997), Qatari footballer
- Saif Al-Qeshtah (born 1993), Saudi footballer
- Saif al-Rahbi (born 1956), Omani poet, essayist and writer
- Seif Asser Sherif (born 1995), Egyptian trampoline gymnast
- Saif Badar (born 1998), Pakistani-born cricketer
- Seif Bamporiki (died 2021), Rwandan politician
- Saif bin Futtais (born 1973), Emirati sports shooter
- Saif bin Hamad Al Sharqi, Sheikh of Fujairah (1936–1938)
- Saif bin Zayed Al Nahyan (born 1968), politician from the United Arab Emirates
- Saif bin Sultan, Imam of the Ibadi sect in Oman (1692–1711)
- Sayf Bulad (born 1988), Syrian military officer and former rebel leader
- Seif Daoud (born 1977), Egyptian footballer
- Saif Durbar (born 1961), Pakistani-Central African businessman, investor and property developer
- Seif Eissa (born 1998), Egyptian taekwondo practitioner
- Seif El-Deraa (born 1998), Egyptian handball player
- Saif Farghani (died 1348), Persian poet
- Seif Gaafar (born 1999), Egyptian footballer
- Saif Gaddafi, multiple people
- Saïf Ghezal (born 1981), Tunisian footballer
- Saif Ghobash (1932–1977), Emirati diplomat and engineer
- Saif Hafizur Rahman (born 1958), Bangladeshi politician
- Saif Hasan, Indian playwright, stage director and producer
- Saif Hassan (born 1998), Bangladeshi cricketer
- Seif Heneida (born 2005), Egyptian-Qatari pole vaulter
- Saif ibn Dhi Yazan (c. 516–575), semi-legendary Himyarite king
- Sayf ibn Umar (died 786/809), Iraqi Islamic historian
- Seif Kadhim (born 1991), Swedish-Iraqi footballer
- Saif Kerawala (born 1997), American soccer player
- Saif Khalfan (born 1993), Emirati footballer
- Seif Khalifa (born 1988), Tanzanian cricketer
- Saif Khan Barha (died 1616), Mughal nobleman
- Saif Lodin, Afghan social activist, writer and former finance officer
- Saif Mohammed Al Bishr (born 1983), Emirati footballer
- Saif Nabeel (born 1986), Iraqi singer and composer
- Saif Rashid (born 1994), Emirati footballer
- Seif Rashidi (born 1957), Tanzanian politician
- Saif Saaeed Shaheen (born 1982), Kenyan-Qatari steeplechase runner
- Saif Salman (born 1989), Iraqi footballer
- Saif Samejo (born 1984), Pakistani musician, singer and songwriter
- Seif Samir (born 1993), Egyptian basketball player
- Seif Sharif Hamad (1943–2021), Tanzanian politician
- Seif Shenawy (born 2001), Egyptian squash player
- Seif Teiri (born 1994), Sudanese footballer
- Seif Teka (born 1991), Tunisian footballer
- Saif Tyabji (1904–1957), Indian solicitor, mathematician, educationist and politician
- Adam Sayf Viacava (born 1999), known simply as Sayf, Italian rapper
- Seif Wanly (1906–1979), Egyptian painter
- Saif Yousef (born 1989), Emirati footballer
- Saif Zaib (born 1998), English cricketer
- Sultan Saif Salim (born 1995), Emirati footballer
- Syed Saif Abbas Naqvi, Indian Shia Muslim cleric

=== Surname ===
- Abdulla Hassan Saif, Bahraini banker and politician
- Abu Omar al-Saif (1968/69–2005), Saudi Islamist and fighter
- Adam Saif (born 1957), Yemeni actor and comedian
- Ahmed bin Saif, multiple people
- Ahmed Saif (born 1983), Qatari snooker player
- Ahmed Saif (footballer) (born 1991), Emirati footballer
- Ali Khamis Seif (born 1954), Tanzanian politician
- Alya Ahmed Saif Al-Thani (born 1974), Qatari diplomat
- Assaad Seif (born 1967), Lebanese archaeologist and academic
- Atef Abu Saif (born 1973), Palestinian writer
- Badr bin Saif (died 1806), Oman royal
- Baha' Seif (born 1995), Jordanian footballer
- Detlef Seif (born 1962), German politician
- Faisal Saif (1976–2022), Indian film director and writer
- Farjad Saif (born 1966), Pakistani table tennis player
- Grace Saif (born 1996), British actress
- Hayat Saif (1942–2019), Bangladeshi poet and critic
- Jorge Seif (born 1977), Brazilian politician
- Linda Saif, American microbial scientist and academic
- Khader Abu-Seif (born c. 1988), Israeli-Palestinian copywriter and LGBT rights activist
- M. Taher Saif, Bangladeshi American mechanical engineer
- Mark Seif (born 1967), American poker player, attorney and TV host
- Mohammad Saif, multiple people
- Mona Seif (born 1986), Egyptian human rights activist
- Mostafa Elwi Saif (born 1950), Egyptian politician and academic
- Muhammad Ali Saif, Pakistani politician
- Rajwa Al Saif (born 1994), Saudi royal, architect and wife of the Jordanian Crown Prince
- Riad Seif (born 1946), Syrian political dissident and businessman
- Saifuddin Saif (1922–1993), Pakistani lyricist, poet and filmmaker
- Salah Abu Seif (1915–1996), Egyptian film director and screenwriter
- Sami Saif (born 1972), Danish documentary filmmaker
- Samir Seif (1947–2019), Egyptian film director and screenwriter
- Sanaa Seif (born 1993), Egyptian activist and film editor
- Sultan Saif (1993–2020), Emirati footballer
- Umar Saif (born 1979), Pakistani computer scientist
- Valiollah Seif (born 1952), Iranian banker and economist
- Walid Saif (born 1948), Palestinian-Jordanian poet, writer, critic and academic

=== Compound names with Saif as an element ===
- Saifullah, multiple people
- Saiful Islam, multiple people
- Sayf al-Din, multiple people
- Saifur Rehman, multiple people
- Saifuzzaman, multiple people
- Saiful Alam, multiple people
- Saiful Haq, multiple people
  - S. Muhammad Saiful Hoque, Bangladeshi diplomat
  - Saif Ul Haque (born 1958), Bangladeshi architect
- Saif al-Nasr, multiple people
  - Farouk Seif Al Nasr (1922–2009), Egyptian politician
  - Magy Seif El-Nasr, American academic
  - Mohamed Seif El-Nasr (born 1983), Egyptian volleyball player
- Seifu, (Amharic: ሰይፉ) "(he is) the sword," multiple people
  - Saifu, Ethiopian-Arab legendary figure
  - Seifu Mikael, Ethiopian royal and general
  - Seifu Makonnen, Ethiopian Olympic boxer
  - Girma Seifu, Ethiopian politician
  - Seifu Tura, Ethiopian long-distance runner
  - Fantahun Seifu, Ethiopian Olympic boxer
  - Seifu Retta, Ethiopian Olympic boxer

== Other uses ==
- Saif, Iran (disambiguation)
- Seif, Wisconsin
- Omar Sa'if Center, a Taliban center on the outskirts of Kabul
- Seifu on EBS, Ethiopian talk show hosted by Seifu Fantahun
- Seifu, New York cocktail

== See also ==
- Saiph or Kappa Orionis, a star in the constellation Orion
