= Majid, Iran =

Majid (Persian: مجيد), in Iran, may refer to:

- Majid, Shadegan, Khuzestan Province
- Majid, Shushtar, Khuzestan Province
- Majid, Mazandaran
- Majid, Sistan and Baluchestan
