= Majd =

Majd or Magd (Arabic: مجد) is an Arabic name which means "glory" or "praise". It may refer to:

== Organisations ==
- Majd Movement, a political party in Lebanon
- Al-Majd Club, a Saudi Arabian football club
- Al Majd SC, now AC Tripoli, a Lebanese football club
- Al-Majd SC, now Damascus Al-Ahli Club, a Syrian football club
- Almajd TV Network, a Saudi Arabian television network
- Algerian Movement for Justice and Development (MAJD), a political party in Algeria

== People ==
- Fouzieh Majd, Persian composer and ethnomusicologist
- Mohammad Gholi Majd (born 1946), Iranian historian and author
- Majd Izzat al-Chourbaji (born 1981), Syrian peace activist
- Majd al-Dawla (997–1029), Iranian political leader
- Majd ad-Din (disambiguation)
- Majd Eddin Ghazal (born 1987), Syrian high jumper
- Magd Harbasha (born 1990), Syrian basketball player
- Majd Homsi (born 1982), Syrian football player
- Majd Kamalmaz, American psychotherapist detained in Syria since February 2017
- Majd Mastoura, Tunisian film actor and translator
- Majd Shweikeh (born 1966), Jordanian businesswoman and politician

== Places ==
- Majd, Iran
- Majd al-Krum, Israel
- Al-Majd, Hebron

== Ships ==
- MV Magd (1943), an Egyptian and United Arab Republic tanker in service 1957–67.

== See also ==
- Majda, a given name
- Majed (disambiguation)
- Magdalene (given name)
