= Mu'in al-Din =

Mu'in al-Din or Moinuddin (Arabic: معین الدین) is a male Muslim name composed of the elements Muin, meaning helper and ad-Din, meaning of the faith. It may refer to:

- Moinuddin Ahmed (disambiguation), multiple people
- Mu'in ad-Din Unur (d. 1149), Seljuk ruler of Damascus
- Mu'in al-Din Chishti (1143–1236), Sufi saint
- Mu'in al-Din Hasan ibn al-Shaykh (d. 1246), vizier of the Ayyubid sultanate
- Pervâne Mu'in al-Din Suleyman (d. 1277), politician in Anatolia
- Mo'in al-Din Junayd ibn Mahmud ibn Muhammad Baghnovi Shirazi, or just Junayd Shirazi (fl. 1389), Persian Sufi poet
- Muhammad Mueenuddeen I (d. 1835), sultan of the Maldives
- Muhammad Mueenuddeen II (fl. 1887), sultan of the Maldives
- Sir Nawab Muhammed Moin Uddin Khan (1891–1941), Indian nobleman
- Ghulam Moinuddin Khanji (1911–2003), Indian prince
- Syed Ghulam Moinuddin Gilani (1920–1997), Pakistani Sufi saint
- Syed Khwaja Moinuddin (1924–1978), Indian football player
- Khan Mohammad Moinuddin (1930–1981), Bangladeshi author
- Moinuddin Haider (born 1942), Pakistan army General
- Moinuddin Aqeel (born 1946), Pakistani author, critic and linguist
- Mirza Ghulam Moinuddin Muhammad, Javaid Jah Bahadur (b. 1946), Indian descendant of the Mughal emperors
- Chowdhury Mueen-Uddin (born 1948), Bangladeshi journalist
- Moin Uddin Bhuiyan (1948–2011), Bangladeshi politician
- Mayeen Uddin Khan Badal (1952–2019), Bangladeshi politician
- Syed Ghulam Moinuddin (born 1958), Pakistani field hockey player
- Mohammad Moinuddin Abdullah (born 1959), Bangladeshi civil servant
- Moin Uddin (general) (born 1961), Bangladeshi general
- Kausar Mohiuddin (born 1963), Indian politician
- Moin Uddin (born 1965), Bangladeshi politician
- Moinuddin (cricketer) (born 1987), Pakistani cricketer
- Moinuddin Rubel (born 1988), Bangladeshi cricketer
- Moinuddin Khan, Indian footballer
- Abu Jafar Mohammad Moinuddin, Bangladeshi politician
- Arif Moinuddin, Bangladeshi politician
- Moin Uddin Sarkar, Bangladeshi politician
- Sheikh Moin Uddin, Bangladeshi civil engineer
- Mohammad Moinuddin Miazi, Bangladeshi politician

== See also ==
- Moinuddin Ahmad Art Gallery, Aligarh Muslim University
- Shrine of Mu'in al-Din Chishti
- Khwaja Moinuddin Chishti Language University
- Moinuddinpur, Gujrat
