= Zamiruddin =

Zamir Uddin (Arabic: ضمير الدين) is a Muslim masculine given name of Arabic origin. Notable people with the name include:

- Zamiruddin Ahmad (1878–1940), Bengali Islamic scholar and educationist
- Muhammad Zamiruddin Sircar (born 1931), former President of Bangladesh
- Zamir Uddin Nanupuri (1936–2011), Bangladeshi Islamic scholar and mystic
- Zameer Uddin Shah (born 1948), Deputy Chief of the Indian Army Staff

== See also ==
- Zamir (name)
- Uddin
