= Muslih ud-Din =

Muslih ud-Din, variously spelt Muslihuddin, Muslehuddin, Moslehuddin etc., (Arabic: مصلح الدین) may refer to:

- Muṣliḥ al-Dīn bin Abdallāh Shīrāzī, known as Saadi (1184 – c. 1283), Persian poet
- Mosleh al-Din Lari (1510 – 1572), Persian scholar and historian
- Kurtoğlu Muslihiddin Reis (1487 – c. 1535), Turkish privateer and Ottoman admiral
- Muhammad Muslehuddin Siddiqui (1918–1983), Sufi leader of Hyderabad (India)
- Mosleh Uddin Ahmed, Bangladeshi politician
- Moslehuddin Ahmed, West Bengali politician
- Muslehuddin Ahmad (died 2012), Bangladeshi diplomat and academic
- Musleh Uddin Ahmed, Bangladeshi academic
- Muslehuddin (composer) (1932–2003), Pakistani film composer, music director
- Şeyh Muslihiddin (died 1574), Ottoman Sufi saint and scholar

== See also ==
- Musleh Uddin Bhuiyan Stadium, cricket stadium in Bangladesh
- Muslihudin Čekrekčija Mosque, mosque in Sarajevo
