= Magid =

Magid or Maggid may refer to:

- Magid (Jewish mysticism), in Kabbalah, a revelatory religious experience
- Maggid or Magid, traditional Jewish religious itinerant preacher in Judaism
- Magid, a type of fictional magician in the novel Deep Secret by Diana Wynne Jones

== Surname ==
- Andy Magid (born 1944), American mathematician
- Barry Magid, American psychoanalyst
- Deborah Magid, American actor
- Frank Magid (1931-2010), American marketing consultant
- Hillel Noah Maggid (1829-1903) Russian-Jewish genealogist and historian
- Jill Magid (born 1973), American conceptual artist
- Larry Magid (born 1947), American journalist and writer
- Lee Magid (1926-2007), American music producer
- Magid Magid (born 1989), British-Somali politician
- Shaul Magid, American rabbi and professor
- Sofia Magid (1894-1954), Soviet Jewish Folklorist
- Will Magid, known as Balkan Bump, American music producer

== See also ==
- Majid (disambiguation)
