= Majid Amidpour =

Professor

- مجید عمیدپور
- Education: University of Manchester; University of Manchester Institute of Science and Technology (UMIST); University of Tehran
- Scientific career
- Fields: Mechanical Engineering; Energy Engineering
- Institutions: Khajeh Nasir Toosi University of Technology (KNTU), Tehran, Iran; Niroo Research Institute (NRI), Tehran, Iran; Simon Fraser University, Burnaby, Canada (Visiting Professor); Politecnico di Milano, Milan, Italy (Visiting Professor)
- Website: KNTU Profile, NRI Profile

Majid Amidpour (Persian: مجید عمیدپور) is a professor of Mechanical and Energy engineering at Khajeh Nasir Toosi University of Technology (KNTU). He is also the head of Niroo Research Institute (NRI), Tehran, Iran.

== Education ==
Amidpour attended the University of Tehran and received his BSc degree in chemical engineering in 1988. Then he moved to the University of Manchester Institute of Science and Technology (UMIST) and obtained his MSc degree in Energy and Process Integration engineering in 1994. Finally, in 1997, he received his PhD in energy engineering at the University of Manchester, UK.

== Career ==
He is a professor of Mechanical and Energy engineering at Khajeh Nasir Toosi University of Technology (KNTU), Tehran, Iran. He is also the head of the Energy Integration Laboratory at KNTU's Department of Energy Systems Engineering, Faculty of Mechanical Engineering. Amidpour, on the other hand, has participated in several nationwide energy and petroleum industries' projects as a consultant or a managing board member.

=== Work experiences ===
Some of his work experiences are as follows:

- Head of the Research and Innovation Center of the Ministry of Industries of Iran (2000 - 2002)
- Managing board member of the Iranian Energy Association (IEA) (2004 - 2009)
- Director of MSc joint program with Centre for Process Integration, University of Manchester, UK (2004-2009)
- Chairman of the Energy Committee of the National Iranian Oil Products Distribution Company (NIOPDC) (since 2010)
- Member of the Council for the Promotion of Energy Technologies of the Ministry of Petroleum of Iran (since 2012)
- Managing board member of the Fuel Cell Association of Iran (2012 - 2019)
- Head of the Faculty of Mechanical Engineering, Khajeh Nasir Toosi University of Technology (KNTU), Tehran, Iran (2013)
- Board of trustees at the Research Institute of Petroleum Industry (RIPI) (2015-2019)
- Director of the Energy and Environment Research Center, Niroo Research Institute (NRI) (since 2015)

=== Scientific affiliations ===
As a professor, he has affiliated to some research universities and institutions:

- Department of Energy Systems Engineering, Faculty of Mechanical Engineering, Khajeh Nasir Toosi University of Technology (KNTU), Tehran, Iran (since 2001)
- Department of Energy Engineering, Sharif University of Technology, Tehran, Iran (Invited Professor) (2009 - 2010)
- Faculty of New Sciences and Technologies, University of Tehran, Tehran, Iran (Adjunct Professor) (2011 - 2012)
- Energy and Environment Research Center, Niroo Research Institute (NRI), Tehran, Iran (since 2015)
- Dipartimento di Energia, Politecnico di Milano, Milano, Lombardia, Italy (Visiting Professor) (2017 - 2018)
- School of Mechatronic Systems Engineering, Simon Fraser University, Burnaby, British Columbia, Canada (Visiting Professor) (2018)

== Research ==
Amidpour and his research team are working on different aspects of the Energy and Water Integration Systems through using Cogeneration approaches including systems that are utilizing renewable energies. They are also investigating the energy systems' integration with environmental issues (carbon emission trading), agriculture productions (water, energy, and food nexus), and energy materials (clean technologies). They have profited from various analysing methods (e.g. pinch technology, exergy analysis, and constructal theory) to achieve their goals to modify the energy and water consumption patterns in Oil and Gas Industries.

Majid Amidpour has published more than 370 national and international conference and journal articles; his book "Cogeneration and Polygeneration Systems", which was published by Elsevier Science & Technology, adopts exergetic and thermoeconomic analysis and related modeling and simulation tools to inform performance and systems design in modern cogeneration plants. Because of his scientific efforts, his name has been listed among the world's top 1% scientists by Essential Science Indicators (ESI).
