= Moinuddin Ahmed (disambiguation) =

Moinuddin Ahmed (Bengali: মঈনুদ্দীন আহমদ) is an Arabic masculine given name. It may refer to:

- Moinuddin Ahmed Chowdhury (1921–1998), Bangladeshi landlord and politician
- Muin-ud-din Ahmad Khan (1926–2021), Bangladeshi historian
- Moeenuddin Ahmad Qureshi (1930–2016), Caretaker Prime Minister of Pakistan
- Dr. Moinuddin Ahmed Montu (1936–2011), Bangladeshi politician
- Moeen Uddin Ahmed (born 1953), 12th Chief of Army Staff of the Bangladesh Army
- Moinuddin Ahmed (born 1971), Assam politician

== Places ==
- Moinuddin Ahmad Art Gallery, Aligarh Muslim University

== See also ==
- Moinuddin
- Ahmad (name)
