= Soltanpour =

Soltanpour is a surname. Notable people with the surname include:

- Kiyan Soltanpour (born 1989), Azerbaijani-Iranian footballer
- Majid Soltanpour (born 1999), Iranian footballer
