= Anwaruddin =

Anwaruddin is a Muslim male name formed from the elements Anwar and ad-Din. It thus means "light of the faith". It may refer to:

- Anwaruddin Muhammed Khan (1672–1749), Nawab of Arcot, major figure during the Second Carnatic War
- Anwaruddin Choudhury (born 1958), Indian naturalist
- Anwar Uddin (born 1981), English footballer
