= Mansur ad-Din =

Mansur ad-Din (Arabic: منصور الدين) is a male Muslim given name, composed of the elements Mansur and ad-Din. It may refer to:

- Mansur ad-Din of Adal (died 1424), sultan of Adal
- Muhammed Mansooruddin (1904–1987), Bangladeshi author, literary critic, lexicographer and song collector
