= Mafiz =

Mafiz, Mufiz, or Mofiz is a masculine given name of Arabic origin. Notable people with the name include:

== People ==
- Mafiz Ali Chowdhury (1919–1994), Bangladeshi politician and minister
- Ali Mufiz (born 1944), Indonesian academician and Governor of Central Java

=== Compound names with Mafiz as an element ===
==== Mafiz al-Din ====
- Mafizuddin Ahmed Hazarika (1870–1958), Assamese poet
- Mafizuddin Ahmad (1891–1979), Bangladeshi politician and former Education Minister
- Mafizuddin Ahmed Sarkar (1921–1997), Bangladeshi scientist and first vice-chancellor of Jahangirnagar University
- Mofiz Uddin Talukder, Bangladeshi politician

==== Mafiz Allah ====
- Mafizullah Kabir (1925–1986), Bangladeshi historian

==== Mafiz al-Islam ====
- Mofizul Islam (1926–1991), Bangladeshi politician
- Mafizul Islam Khan Kamal, Bangladeshi politician

==== Mafiz al-Rahman ====
- Mafizur Rahman (born 1978), Bangladeshi footballer

== See also ==
- Bablu
- Tipu
