= Kafil al-Din =

Kafiluddin or Kafil Uddin is a Bengali masculine given name of Arabic origin. Notable people with the name include:

- Kafiluddin Chowdhury (1898– 1972), Bangladeshi minister
- Kafil Uddin Sonar (1943–2019), Bangladeshi politician
- Kafiluddin Chatgami, Bangladeshi politician
- Mahmoud Kafil Uddin (died 2011), former Finance Secretary of Bangladesh

== See also ==
- Kafeel
- Uddin
