= Kafeel =

Kafeel may refer to:

- Kafeel Khan, an Indian doctor
- Kafeel, a Bedouin arbitrator, see Bedouin systems of justice
- Kafilur Rahman Nishat Usmani (1942–2006), Mufti of Deoband
- Kafeel Ahmad Qasmi (born 1951), Indian Islamic scholar
- Kafeel Ahmed (died 2007), one of the perpetrators of the 2007 Glasgow International Airport attack
- Kafeel (TV series), 2025 Pakistani series
- A sponsor in the kafala migrant labor system

== See also ==
- Kafil al-Din
