= Majid Khan =

Majid Khan may refer to:

== People ==
- Majid Khan (cricketer) (born 1946), Pakistani Test cricketer
- Majid Khan (cricketer, born 1989) (born 1989), Pakistani cricketer
- Majid Khan (detainee) (born 1980), Pakistani-American Guantanamo detainee, released to Belize in 2023
- Majeed Khan, one of the perpetrators of the 1993 Bombay bombings

== Places ==
- Majid Khan, Iran, a village
