= Sayf al-Din =

Sayf al-Din (Arabic: سيف الدين, romanized: Sayf al-Dīn, lit. 'Sword of the Faith'), also Saif al-Din, Sayf/Saif ad-Din, or Sayf/Saif ud-Din etc., may refer to:

- Sayf al-Din Suri (died 1149), Ghurid king
- Saif ad-Din Ghazi I (died 1149), Zangid emir of Mosul
- Ghazi II Saif ud-Din (died 1180), Zangid emir of Mosul
- al-Malik al-Adil Sayf al-Din Abu-Bakr ibn Ayyub, or just Al-Adil I, also known as "Saphadin", (1145–1218), Ayyubid sultan of Egypt
- Sayf al-Din al-Amidi (died 1233), Islamic jurist
- Saifuddin Aibak (died 1236), governor of Bengal
- Saif ad-Dīn al-Malik al-ʿĀdil Abū Bakr b. Nāṣir ad-Dīn Muḥammad, or just Al-Adil II (died 1248), Ayyubid sultan of Egypt
- Saif ad-Din Qutuz (died 1260), Mamluk sultan of Egypt
- Saif ad-Dīn Qalawun aṣ-Ṣāliḥī (c. 1222–1290), Mamluk sultan of Egypt
- Saif ad-Din Abu-Bakr (c. 1321–1341), Mamluk sultan of Egypt
- Al-Malik Az-Zahir Sayf ad-Din Barquq (died 1399), Burji sultan of Egypt
- Saifuddin Hamza Shah (died 1412), fourth Sultan of the first Ilyas dynasty of Bengal
- Sayf ad-Din Inal (died 1461) 13th Burji Mamluk sultan of Egypt
- Al-Ashraf Sayf al-Din Qaitbay, (c. 1417–1496), Burji Mamluk Sultan of Egypt
- Al-Ashraf Sayf-ad-Din Barsbay, (c. 1369–1438), Burji Mamluk Sultan of Egypt
- Sayf ad-Din Bilbay, (died 1468), Burji Mamluk Sultan of Egypt
- Sayf ad-Din Jaqmaq, (1373–1453), Burji Mamluk Sultan of Egypt
- Sayf ad-Din Khushqadam, (1413–1467), Burji Mamluk Sultan of Egypt
- Sayf ad-Din Tatar, (died 1421), Burji Mamluk Sultan of Egypt
- Sayf al-Din Malik Arslan, Beg of Dulkadir from 1454 to 1465
- Sayf ad-Din Tuman bay I (died after 1501), Burji Mamluk Sultan of Egypt
- Omar Ali Saifuddin I (died 1795), Sultan of Brunei
- Omar Ali Saifuddin II (died 1852), Sultan of Brunei
- Saifuddin Kitchlew (1888–1963), Muslim Indian lawyer and political activist
- Taher Saifuddin (1888–1965), leader of the Dawoodi Bohras community
- Seif el-Din el-Zoubi (1913–1986), Israeli-Arab politician
- Omar Ali Saifuddien III (1914–1986), Sultan of Brunei
- Saifuddin Azizi (1915–2003), Uyghur chairman of the people's council of Xinjiang, China
- Mohammad Saifuddin (1996), Bangladeshi cricketer
- Saifuddin Ahmed (1927–2010), Bangladeshi film actor
- Saifuddin Soz (born 1937), Indian academic and politician
- Mufaddal Saifuddin (born 1946)
- Salih Saif Aldin (c. 1975–2007), Iraqi journalist
- Khamis Abdullah Saifeldin (born 1976), Qatari runner
- Saifeddine Nejmaoui (born 1981), Tunisian boxer
- Saifuddin Nasution Ismail, Malaysian politician
- Saifuddin Abdullah, Malaysian politician
- Saifuddin Choudhury, Indian politician
- Saifuddin or Saif Ahmad, American poker player
- The Seif al Din pathogen in Patient Zero: A Joe Ledger Novel

== See also ==
- Saif (disambiguation)
- Saiful Islam (disambiguation)
- Sayf al-Dawla (disambiguation)
- Husam al-Din (disambiguation)
