= Fariduddin =

Fariduddin (Arabic: فرید الدّین) is a male Muslim name formed from the name Farid and the qualification ad-Din. It may refer to:

- Farīd ud-Dīn, pen-name of Attar Neyshapuri (c. 1145–c. 1221), Persian Sufi poet
- Fariduddin Ganjshakar (c. 1180–c. 1270), Punjabi Sufi preacher
- Mohammed Fareeduddin, Indian politician
