= Zamir =

Zamir may refer to:

- Zamir (name), a given name and surname in various languages
- Zameer (1975 film), a 1975 Indian film
- Zameer: The Awakening of a Soul, 1997 Indian film
- Zameer: The Fire Within, 2005 Indian romantic drama film

== Others ==
- Zamir Jaffri Cricket Stadium, Jhelum, Pakistan
- Zamir Chorale of Boston, a choral group founded in 1969
