= Majid =

Majid or majeed may refer to:

- مجيد, majīd 'majestic', and ماجد, mājid 'magnificent', two names of God in Islam

== Given name ==
- Majed (name), or variant spellings, including a list of people with the given name or family name

== Arts and entertainment ==
- Majid (film), a 2010 Moroccan film
- Majid (rapper) (born 1975), a Danish rapper of Moroccan-Berber origin
- Majid Jordan, a Canadian R&B duo
- Majid (comics), a pan-Arab comic book anthology and children's magazine

== Other uses ==
- Majid, Iran (disambiguation), a number of places in Iran
- Majeed syndrome, an inherited skin disorder
- Majid (air defense system)

== See also ==
- Majd (disambiguation)
- Majidae, a family of crabs
