= Husam al-Din =

Husam al-Din or Husam ad-Din (Arabic: حسام الدين, lit. 'Sword the Faith') is a masculine given name and surname of Arabic origin. Notable people with the name include:

== Given name ==
- Hassam-ud-Din Rashidi (1911–1982), Pakistani journalist
- Husam al-Din Chalabi (1225–1284), Kurdish Sufi
- Husam al-Din Choban, commander and bey in the Sultanate of Rum
- Husam Uddin Chowdhury Fultali (born 1974), Bangladeshi Islamic scholar and author
- Husam al-Din Abu'l-Hayja (died 1197), Kurdish general
- Hussam ad-Din Jarallah (1884–1954), Grand Mufti of Jerusalem
- Hussam al-Din al-Jarrahi (died 1202), Ayyubid doctor, physician of Saladin
- Husam ad-Din Manikpuri, Indian Islamic scholar
- Husam al-Din Qaraja, governor of Sivas in the Seljuk Sultanate of Rum
- Husam al-Din Timurtash (1105–1154), Artuqid emir of Mardin and ruler of Aleppo
- Hüsamettin Böke (1910–1995), Turkish footballer
- Hüsamettin Cindoruk (1933–2026), Turkish politician
- Hüsamettin Özkan (born 1950), Turkish politician
- Hüsamettin Tut (born 1991), Turkish footballer

== Surname ==
- al-Malik al-Mansour Hossam ad-Din Lajin al-Mansuri (died 1299), Sultan of Egypt
- al-Husayn Husam al-Din (died 1527), leader of the Tayyibi Isma'ili community

== See also ==
- Sayf al-Din (disambiguation)
