= Comilla-13 =

Comilla-13 was a parliamentary constituency in Bangladesh for the Jatiya Sangsad (National Parliament), located in Comilla District.

== History ==
The Comilla-13 constituency was created for the first general elections of independent Bangladesh in 1973. The seat was abolished in 1984.

== Elected Members of Parliament ==
Elected Members
Year	Member	Party
1973	Abdul Hakim Mia	Bangladesh Awami League
1979	Mofizul Islam	National Awami Party
Constituency abolished
