= Sabr ad-Din =

Sabr ad-Din (Arabic: صبر الدين) is an Islamic male given name derived from the elements Sabr and ad-Din. It may refer to:

- Sabr ad-Din I (fl. 1332), Amir of Ifat
- Sabr ad-Din II (died 1422/1423), King of Adal
