= Majid Ghannad =

Iranian film producer, film director and television presenter

- مجید قناد
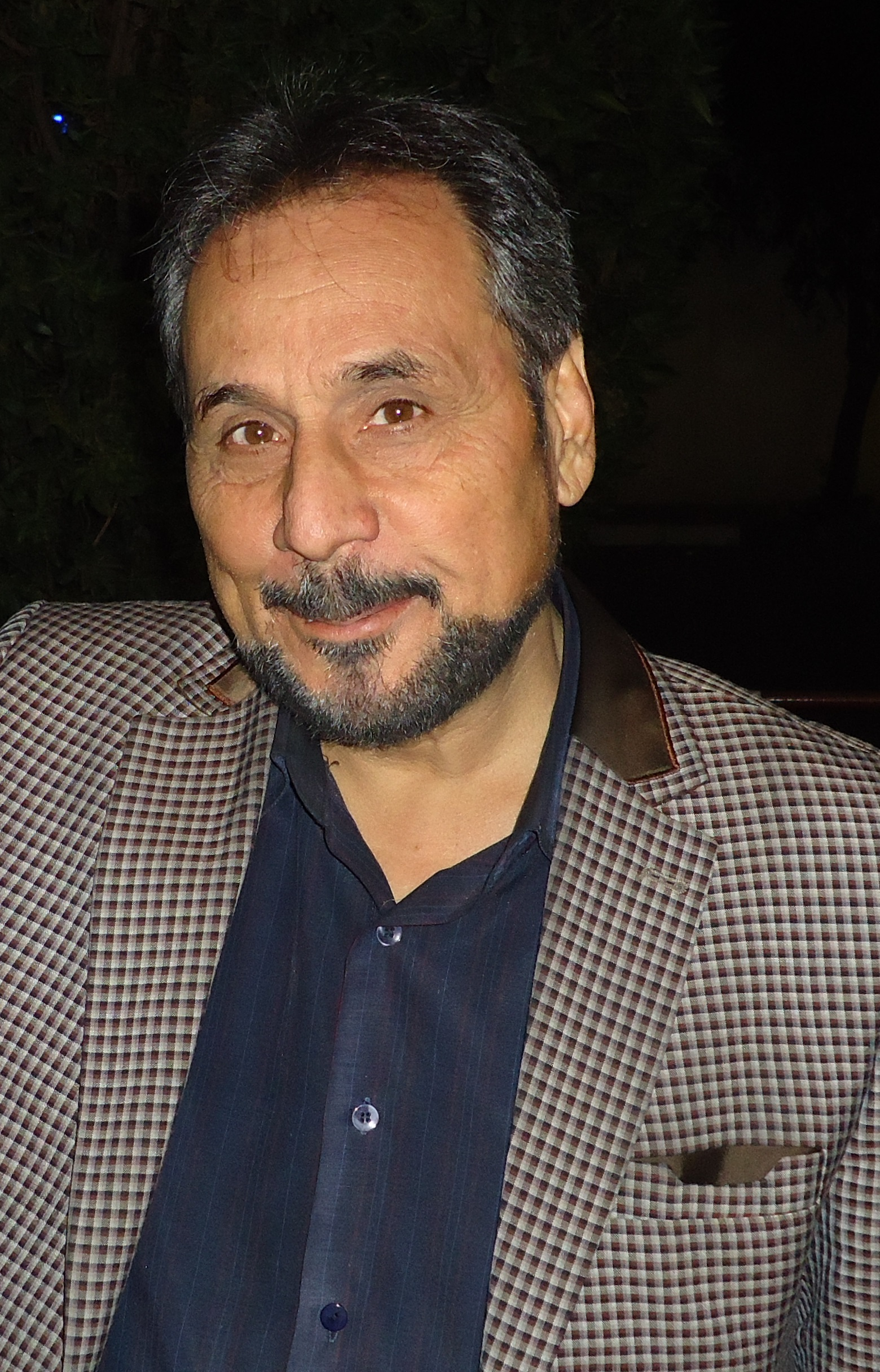
- Ghanad in 2010
- Born: 26 June 1954 (age 72); Khorramshahr, Iran
- Education: University of Tehran
- Years active: 1981–present
- Known for: Children TV shows
- Children: 3
- Awards: Best presenter (Jame Jam TV)

Majid Ghannad (Persian: مجید قناد; born 26 June 1954) is an Iranian television presenter, producer, and director. He is mostly known for his works in Iran local TV for children, like Fitile Jom'eh Tatileh, School to school and Ghelgheli. He is also known as Uncle Ghannad among children.

== Early life ==
Ghannad born in 1954 in Shadegan. His father died when he was 7 years old. After that time, his mother, who was a nurse, was his only maintainer.

He was interested in theater since he was studying in elementary school. In 1975, his teacher, Mohammad Abuyi, who was a writer helped Ghannad get into Abadan local TV art works. After that time he became more eager about this work.

When he was studying at high school, he was working for his uncle, who was a carpenter. However, some times he had worked for other people in restaurant.

== Career ==
He started his work in TV shows when he was 28 years old in Abadan local TV (1976). When the Iran–Iraq War began, he continued his work as a director in Isfahan local TV and in 1982, he worked for Khoramabad local TV for a year. After that he came to Tehran to continue his higher education. Meanwhile, he was working for IRIB 2 as a television presenter and director. His weekend shows started from 1983. He got his bachelor's degree in acting from University of Tehran.

He has also worked for House of Cinema and Jame Jam TV.

Fitileh was one of his most famous shows, which continued for eight years (2003–2011). In 2011, he stopped working on the show as the presenter and another host was brought to replace him. However, he still served as the producer.

== Personal life ==
He has two daughters and a son.

He goes through physical examination every 8 months and visits a psychologist whenever he needs to talk.

== Films and shows ==
He has created plenty of shows, films, series and exhibitions. Some of the most famous ones are listed below:

- School to school (120 episodes)
- Play, Happiness, Watching (80 episodes)
- Week's show (26 episodes)
- Charkhunak (52 episodes)
- Distance (short film)
- Flower and flower pot (104 episodes)
- Hourglass (104 episodes)
- Cousins (26 episodes)
- Happiness game (52 episodes)
- Mr. Ghurghur (26 episodes)
- Palam Pulum Pilim (26 episodes)
- Twins (26 episodes)
- All of my daughters (film)
- City in children's control (film)
- Fitile Jom'eh Tatileh (for 8 years at weekends)
- Scarecrow yourself

== See also ==
- Dariush Farziaei
- Adel Ferdosipour
- Kamran Najafzadeh
