= Ismat ad-Din =

Ismat ad-Din (Arabic: عصمة الدين) may refer to:

- Ismat ad-Din Khatun (died 1186), also known as Asimat, wife of Nur ad-Din and Saladin
- Ismat ad-Din Umm-Khalil Shajar al-Durr (died 1257), Sultana of Egypt
