= Zamir (name) =

Zamir or Zameer is both a given name and surname of multiple origins in Jewish, Arabic, and Albanian cultures.

- In Hebrew, Zamir (Hebrew: זמיר) is a transliteration of Hebrew: זמיר, meaning "singer" (rarely, for a male singer with a high pitched voice) or "nightingale."
- In Arabic, Zamir (Arabic: ضمیر) means "heart" or "conscience". This is properly transliterated as Ḍamīr but commonly appears as Zamir, Zameer, Damir, or Dameer.
- Among Albanians, Zamir is a male given name which means "good voice." Its feminine form is Zamira.

== Given name ==
- Zamir Ali Badayuni (1941–2003), Pakistani writer
- Zamir Jafri (1916–1999), Pakistani poet
- Zamir Kabulov (born 1954), Russian diplomat
- Zameer Ahmed Khan (born 1966), Indian politician
- Zamir Niazi (1932–2004), Pakistani journalist
- Zameer Rizvi (born 1981), Pakistani-Canadian singer and musician
- Muhd Zameer Zainun (born 1990), Malaysian footballer

== Surname ==
- Anat Zamir (1962–2018), Israeli actress and model
- Asaf Zamir (born 1980), Israeli politician
- Daniel Zamir (born 1981), Israeli saxophonist
- Eyal Zamir (born 1966), Israeli general, IDF Chief of the General Staff
- Hagai Zamir (born 1951), Israeli paralympic champion
- Tzachi Zamir (born 1967), Israeli philosopher and literary critic
- Yitzhak Zamir (born 1931), Israeli judge
- Zvi Zamir (1925–2024), Israeli soldier and Mossad chief

== See also ==
- Zamir (disambiguation)
