= Azim ud-Din =

Azim ud-Din is the proper and regnal name of the sultan of Sulu, a constitutional and "defunct" sultanate in the province of Sulu, southern Philippines. In history, there are three sultans that possessed the name, the fourth one is a pretender of the throne:

- Azim ud-Din I, 19th sultan of Sulu, the baptized sultan and was restored by the British to the throne in 1764.
- Azim ud-Din II, 21st sultan of Sulu, nephew of Azim ud-Din I and poisoned Sultan Muhammad Israil in 1778.
- Azim ud-Din III, 24th sultan of Sulu and reigned for only 40 days.
- Jamalul Azam Alam, who taken the name Azim ud-Din IV, pretender of the throne from the Shakiraullah branch of the royal family.
- Azzimuddin (detainee) (born 1972), held in Bagram Internment Facility, Afghanistan
