= Majd Izzat al-Chourbaji =

Syrian activist (born 1981)

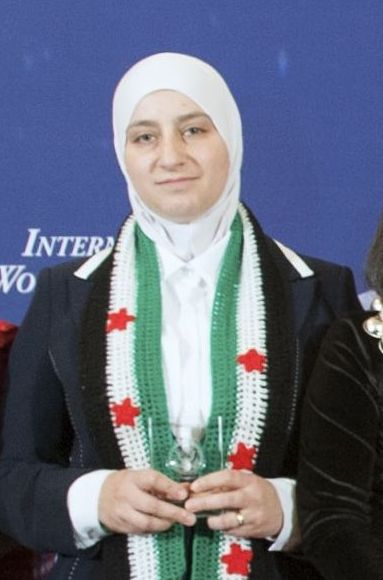
- Majd Chourbaji, 2015 International Women of Courage Award
- Born: 1981 (age 44–45); Darayya, Syria
- Occupation: Activist
- Known for: Recipient of 2015 International Women of Courage Award

Majd Izzat al-Chourbaji (Arabic: مجد عزت الشربجي; born 1981) is a Syrian peace activist. In 2015, she was awarded the U.S. State Department's International Women of Courage Award, for her work with women and human rights advocacy in Syria.

== Biography ==
Madj Izzat al-Chourbaji was born in 1981 in the town of Darayya, Syria. When she was six months old, her family fled to France to escape violence in the region, but returned in 1991. She graduated from Damascus University with a college degree in French Literature. After college, she worked on an anti-corruption campaign in Damascus suburbs.

== Activism ==
When the Arab Spring spilled over into Syria, Chourbaji organized sit-ins calling for the release of political prisoners. She was arrested and suffered from police brutality. Despite her injuries, Chourbaji insisted on peaceful protest. She organized workshops among the prisoners to teach peace building and citizenship. Chourbaji persuaded 150 women detainees to go on a hunger strike to force the regime to present their cases to a judge. Her non-violent tactics eventually secured a hearing in a Damascus court, where she and 83 prisoners were granted release in a prisoner swap with the Syrian opposition. Continued surveillance by Syrian security forces resulted in Chourbaji's flight to neighboring Lebanon as an exile with her three children.

Civil war in Syria has left many women vulnerable as targets of sexual violence and as collateral damage of war. Fleeing to the relative safety of Lebanon is challenging, as some 800,000 refugees have sought asylum there from conflict. Housing is scarce and rent prices are at a premium. There is little or no work available, making the prospect of paying rent difficult for refugees who fled with few material goods. As of January, 2015, the situation has become more difficult, as Lebanon has passed mandatory visa requirements for all Syrians crossing its border.

On 2 January 2014, Chourbaji founded Women Now in Lebanon, a center to administer support for refugee women. They provide training for hairdressing and cosmetology, computers, drawing, embroidery, English and French language study, and knitting in addition to psychological support to women and their children.
