= Majid Rasulov =

Soviet and Azerbaijani mathematician and academician

Majid Latif Rasulov (Azerbaijani: Məcid Lətif oğlu Rəsulov; 6 July 1916, Nukha – 11 February 1993, Baku) was a Soviet and Azerbaijani mathematician, academician (1983) and physics-mathematics PhD (1960).

== Achievements ==
Majid Rasulov graduated from the Azerbaijan State University (now Baku State University). He was a prominent specialist in mathematical-physics equations and worked in the field of functional analysis. His research can be divided into 4 directions.

His first direction of research concerned itself with differential equations, including problems related to special solutions of Cauchy problems and contour integrals. The second direction was devoted to spectral theory, where he proved new formulas for differential equations and contour integrals. The third direction concerned the preservation of the norm of linear functionals defined in Banach spaces, where he proved extension results under conditions of uniqueness. Finally, in the fourth direction, he derived normality conditions for linear differential operators.

In 1960, Rasulov received a Doctor of Sciences degree from the Scientific Council of Mathematics University. His monograph, "Method of Contour Integration", was published in 1964 in Moscow. Professor A.I. Ivanov served as the editor of this monograph. In his review, he wrote: "M. Rasulov's monograph is an exceptional event. There is nothing comparable in the Earth's press."

In 1967, "Method of Contour Integration" was translated into the English language by order of the London Mathematics Society and published in Canada, the United States and the Netherlands.

== Awards and honors ==
- Medal "For the Defence of the Caucasus" (1944)
- Medal "For the Victory over Germany in the Great Patriotic War 1941–1945" (1945)
- Jubilee Medal "In Commemoration of the 100th Anniversary of the Birth of Vladimir Ilyich Lenin" (1970)
- Medal "Veteran of Labour" (1979)
- Order of the Red Banner of Labour (1980)
- Order of the Patriotic War, 2nd class (1985)
