= Yashansakhi =

Yashansakhi يشان سخي
- Village
- Location within Iran
- Coordinates: 31°57′32″N 48°35′29″E
- Country: Iran
- Province: Khuzestan
- County: Shushtar
- Bakhsh: Shadravan
- Rural District: Shoaybiyeh-ye Gharbi

Population (2006)
  - Total: 672
- Time zone: UTC+3:30 (IRST)
  - Summer (DST): UTC+4:30 (IRDT)

Yashansakhi (Persian: يشان سخي, also Romanized as Yashānsakhī and Yeshān Sakhī; also known as Majīd) is a village in Shoaybiyeh-ye Gharbi Rural District, Shadravan District, Shushtar County, Khuzestan Province, Iran. At the 2006 census, its population was 672, in 111 families.
