= Social Enterprise Investment Fund =

The Social Enterprise Investment Fund (SEIF) was a United Kingdom Department of Health fund which provided investment to assist social enterprises delivering health and social care services. Established in 2007 with funding of £100 million, it provided grants and loans until 2011, with a further £19 million proposed in 2012.

From June 2009, the fund was managed on behalf of the Department for Health by a consortium consisting of Futurebuilders England and Partnerships UK.

== Context ==
The Government's vision for reform in health and social care services includes developing a provider market that is increasingly plural and diverse. This sets the context for new kinds of organizations to emerge, including social enterprises which provide more choices for patients and a higher quality, more responsive service.

The White Paper, 'Our Health, Our Care, Our Say' (January 2006) identified social enterprises as key means of delivering high quality health and social care services tailored to the needs of communities. It included a commitment to establish a SEIF from April 2007 to:

- provide advice to social entrepreneurs who want to develop new models to deliver health and social care services;
- provide increased choice and more integrated services;
- ensure services become more personalised to the needs of the individual;
- address the problems of start up;
- address current barriers to entry around access to finance; and
- address risks and skills to develop viable business models.

Most recently the High Quality Care For All: NHS Next Stage Review Final Report and the Primary and Community Care Strategy set out a vision for this change, stating the need to empower staff and give patients more choice.

The NHS Next Stage Review includes a number of recommendations that present huge opportunities for new and existing social enterprises. Significant recommendations include:

- the ability to create new social enterprises to deliver primary and community services;
- giving NHS staff the 'right to request' from their PCT to enable them to set up a social enterprise; and
- to allow NHS staff to explore setting up a social enterprise if they believe that this could provide them with independence, flexibility and responsiveness to innovate and improve services and outcomes for patients.

== What the fund provides ==
The SEIF provides investment to new and existing social enterprises that are delivering or planning to bid for health and social care services contracts. The investments take the forms of loans, grants and professional support.
