= Mu'iz ad-Din =

Mu'iz ad-Din (Arabic: معز الدين)is the name of:

- Mu'izzuddīn Muḥammad Ibn Sām, known as Shahabuddin Muhammad Ghori (1149–1206), Sultan of the Ghorid dynasty (Afghanistan)
- Mu'izz ad-Din Mahmud (died 1241), Zengid Emir of Jazira
- Muiz ud din Bahram (died 1242), Muslim Turkic ruler, Sultan of Delhi
- Muiz ud din Qaiqabad (1286–1290), Muslim Turkic ruler, Sultan of Delhi
- Muhammad Mu'iz ud-din (died 1779), sultan of the Maldives
- Chowdhury Moyezuddin Biwshash (fl. c. 1886), powerful Muslim landlord (zamindar) in Bengal
- Sálim Moizuddin Abdul Ali, or Salim Ali (1896–1987), Indian ornithologist and naturalist
- Hassanal Bolkiah Mu'izzaddin Waddaulah (born 1946), Sultan and Yang Di-Pertuan of Brunei
