= Albu Hesar =

Albu Hesar البوحصار
- Village
- Location within Iran
- Coordinates: 30°41′28″N 48°41′06″E
- Country: Iran
- Province: Khuzestan
- County: Shadegan
- Bakhsh: Central
- Rural District: Hoseyni

Population (2006)
  - Total: 625
- Time zone: UTC+3:30 (IRST)
  - Summer (DST): UTC+4:30 (IRDT)

Albu Hesar (Persian: البوحصار, also Romanized as Albū Ḩeşār; also known as Majīd) is a village in Hoseyni Rural District, in the Central District of Shadegan County, Khuzestan Province, Iran. At the 2006 census, its population was 625, in 92 families.
