= Dariush Farziaei =

Iranian TV presenter and producer (born 1973)

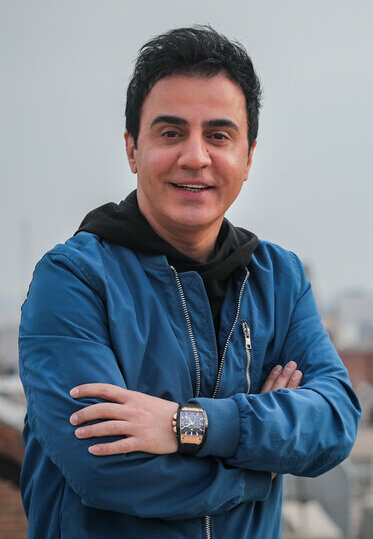
- Farziaei in 2019
- Born: July 23, 1973 (age 52); Tehran, Iran
- Education: Bachelor of graphics
- Occupations: TV presenter; Children's poetry singer
- Years active: 1994–present
- Spouse: none

Dariush Farziaei (Persian: داریوش فرضیایی) (born July 23, 1973) is an Iranian TV presenter and producer who is known with his artistic name Amoo Pourang.

== Early life ==
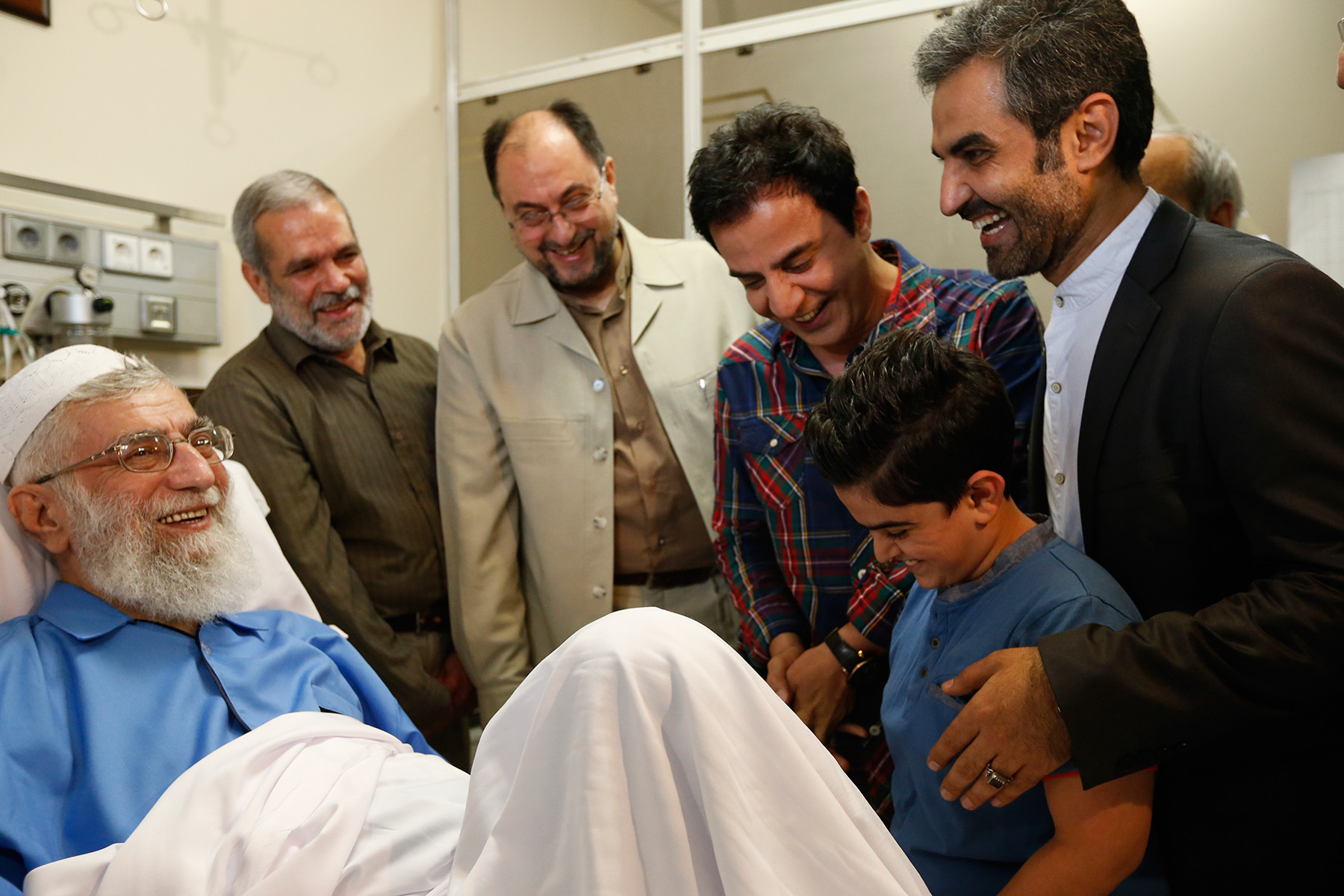
Farziaei and Amir Mohammad Motaghian (boy with blue T-shirt) visiting Ayatollah Seyyed Ali Khamenei

Dariush Farziaei was born on July 23, 1973, in Tehran and is the lastborn in the family. His mother is from Gilan, and his father is Azerbaijanis and from Sarab. Farziaei graduated from the university with a bachelor's degree in graphics.

His image with his father on his deathbed led to some criticism. His father died on June 19, 2014. In September 2014, Farziaei visited Ali Khamenei along with some of his program's crew, including Amir Mohammad Motaghian.

== Career ==
Farziaei entered broadcasting in 1994 and began his career as a radio reporter. He then appeared in various roles on the program Friday Afternoon with Radio, the most notable of which were "Golpesar" and "Nane Belgeis". In 1997, he entered television with the program We and You, which was dedicated to children's requested animations. In 1999, he became famous among children with the TV show Tourang and Pourang, and then in 2001, he gained popularity among both children and adults with performing children and teenagers shows and his artistic name "Amoo Pourang".

Other works by Farziaei include Impartial Network, One and Only and Rain Again with Freshness. Farziaei has appeared as a presenter and actor in the program Police Assistant, which was produced by IRIB in collaboration with the Traffic Police Department. Farziaei and Motaghian have also collaborated on other TV shows such as Pourang's friends garden, One Thousand and Sixty-Six and Amoo Pourang's library. In this recent programs, he has collaborated with people such as Motaghian (roles of Amir Mohammad, Goldoun khan, Agha Negahdar, Agha Mamnoon, and Khaste), Mohammad Reza Kharazmi (roles of Chicken and Dooddoo), Amir Soheili (roles of sultan, Bolbol Khan, Lips and Mouth, and Singer), and Ebrahim Shafiei (roles of Pahlevan Panbeh, Nafas Baba, Ayaz, and Kharman).

In December 2021, rumors of Farziaei's expulsion from IRIB were published by various news agencies and satellite networks, which caused a lot of controversy. However, this rumor was denied by the IRIB public relations.
