= Haqq ad-Din =

Haqq ad-Din may refer to:

- Haqq ad-Din I (fl. 1328), Emir of the Sultanate of Ifat
- Haqq ad-Din II (late 14th century), Sultan of the Sultanate of Ifat
