= Muhib ud-Din =

Muhib ud-Din may refer to:

- Ibn al-Najjar (1183-1246), Iraqi hadith scholar and historian.
- Muhibb al-Din Abu Abdallah Mohammed ibn Umar ibn Rushayd al-Fihri al-Sabti, or briefly Mohammed ibn Rushayd (1259–1321), Moroccan judge, writer and scholar of Hadith
- Muhibb-ud-Deen Al-Khatib, twentieth century Sunni who wrote against the Shi'a
- Almu'tasimu Billahi Muhibbudin Tuanku Alhaj Abdul Halim Mu'adzam Shah (etc. etc.) or Abdul Halim of Kedah (born 1927), Yang di-Pertuan Agong of Malaysia
- Azlan Muhibbuddin Shah, or Azlan Shah of Perak (born 1928), Yang di-Pertuan Agong of Malaysia
