= Rashid al-Din =

Rashid al-Din or Rashid ad-Din (Arabic: رشید الدین), under various transliterations including Rashîduddîn, may refer to:

- Rashid-al-Din Hamadani (1247–1318), Persian historian
- Rashid ad-Din Sinan, 12th century Syrian religious figure and leader of resistance to the Crusades
- Rashid al-Din Vatvat, 12th century Persian royal panegyrist and epistolographer
- Amin al-Din Rashid al-Din Vatvat, 13th century Persian physician
