= Amin al-Din =

Amin al-Din, also transcribed Amin ad-Din and Amin ud-Din, is an Arabic name meaning "Trustee of the Faith". It is the name of:

- Amin al-Din Rashid al-Din Vatvat, 13th-century Persian physician
- Amin ud-din Ahmad Khan (1911–1983), Nawab of the state of Loharu
- Aminuddin Dagar (1923–2000), Indian dhrupad singer
- Mian Aminuddin, Chief Commissioner of Balochistan between 1949 and 1952
- Aminuddin Harun, Malaysian politician

== See also ==
- Institut Aminuddin Baki, Malaysian educational management institute
- SMK Aminuddin Baki, Johor Bahru, Malaysian public national school
- SMK Aminuddin Baki, Kuala Lumpur, Malaysian public school
