= Zahir al-Din =

Zahir al-Din (Arabic: ظهیرالدّین) may refer to:

- Zahir ad-Din Toghtekin (died 1128), Turkic military leader who was atabeg of Damascus
- Zahir-al-Din Faryabi (died 1201), Persian poet
- Zahir al-Din Karawi (fl. 1355/56), leader of the Sarbadars of Sabzewar
- Zahir ud-din Muhammad Babur (1483–1531), Muslim conqueror who laid the basis for the Mughal dynasty of India
- Chowdhury Abd-Allah Zaheeruddin, known as Lal Mia (1903–1969), Bengali politician
- Humayun Zahiruddin Amir-i Kabir, or Humayun Kabir (1906–1969), Indian politician
- A. M. Zahiruddin Khan (1936–2005), Bangladeshi industrialist and politician
- Zahir Uddin Ahmed (born 1957), Chief of Staff of Bangladesh Navy
- Zaheer-ud-din Babar Awan (born 1957?/1959?), Pakistani politician
- Zahiruddin (diplomat), Bangladeshi politician and diplomat
