= Musleh Uddin Bhuiyan Stadium =

Cricket stadium in Bangladesh

Coordinates: 23°55′55.44″N 90°42′36.94″E

- Interactive map of Musleh Uddin Bhuiyan Stadium
- Location: Narsingdi, Bangladesh
- Owner: National Sports Council
- Operator: National Sports Council
- Surface: Grass

Tenants
- Narsingdi Cricket Team; Narsingdi Football Team

Musleh Uddin Bhuiyan Stadium, formerly known as Abdul Mannan Bhuiyan Stadium is a cricket stadium in Narsingdi, Bangladesh. It is located by the Narsingdi Circuit House and NKM High School & Homes. It is one of the biggest stadiums in the district. The stadium regularly hosts many local and inter-district cricket and football matches, as well as parades and displays in the national days in Bangladesh.

== See also ==
- Stadiums in Bangladesh
- List of cricket grounds in Bangladesh
