= Musleh Uddin Ahmed =

Professor A N M Rois Uddin

Shahjalal University of Science and Technology
- In office 28 April 2003 – 22 October 2006

Personal details
- Born: Bangladesh
- Occupation: Professor, University Administrator

Musleh Uddin Ahmed is an academic and former vice-chancellor of the Shahjalal University of Science and Technology.

== Early life ==
Ahmed completed his bachelor's degree, masters, and PhD in public administration at the University of Dhaka.

== Career ==
Ahmed is a professor of the department of public administration at the University of Dhaka. In 2002, he was appointed pro-vice-chancellor of the Shahjalal University of Science and Technology. on 27 April 2003, he was appointed vice-chancellor of the Shahjalal University of Science and Technology following the resignation of Professor Md. Shafiqur Rahman in the face of protests by students and faculty.

Students of Shahjalal University of Science and Technology and Jalalabad Ragib-Rabeya Medical College Hospital clashed for a number of days in May 2006 after which students at the university protested demanding Ahmed resign. Bangladesh police fired at protestors killing one student and wounding others. In response, students attacked the official residence of the vice-chancellor, burned down furniture worth 5 million taka, and confined Ahmed with his family for hours. Bangladesh Rifles and Police were deployed and all dorms were closed. Leaders of ruling Bangladesh Nationalist Party and Bangladesh Jamaat-e-Islami visited the official residence in a failed effort to get the students to release Ahmed. Students also attacked journalists seriously injuring Md Aftabuddin of the Daily Naya Diganta. Ahmed submitted a handwritten resignation letter to President Iajuddin Ahmed. He returned to campus under protection of police and Bangladesh Jatiotabadi Chatradal activists He could not reopen the university as his return was opposed by faculty members and nine senior faculty members, including Muhammad Zafar Iqbal, demanded his resignation. Teachers, aligned with the Awami League demanded his resignation.

During Ahmed's tenure at Shahjalal University of Science and Technology, he appointed 155 faculty members. In 2007, an investigation team of the University Grants Commission, led by Professor Mohammad Mahbub Ullah, went to investigate allegations of irregularities at the university.

Ahmed was the acting ameer of Ahle Hadith Andolon Bangladesh. In May 2006, he blamed Bangladesh Jamaat-e-Islami for the arrest of Asadullah Al Galib, ameer of Ahle Hadith Andolon Bangladesh. In 2010, he signed an open letter along with professors Khan Sarwar Murshid, Zillur Rahman Siddiqui, Muzaffer Ahmad, M Hafizuddin Khan, ASM Shahjahan, Akbar Ali Khan, Sultana Kamal, Jamal Nazrul Islam, Selina Hossain, Ajoy Roy, Syed Abul Maksud, Dilara Chowdhury, Sikandar Khan, Syed Anwar Hossain, Tofael Ahmed, Mainul Islam, Manzurul Islam, Mahfuza Khanam, Ataus Samad, Asif Nazrul, Mohammad Zahangir, Shyamal Dutta, and Badiul Alam Majumder calling on political parties to abolish their associate bodies.
