= Saif Gaddafi =

Saif Gaddafi is probably an abbreviation of one of the following sons of Muammar Gaddafi:

- Saif al-Islam Gaddafi (1972–2026)
- Saif al-Arab Gaddafi (1982–2011)
