= Azharuddin =

Azharuddin may refer to:

- Azhar ud-din Muhammad Azim Mirza, Azim-ush-Shan Bahadur (1664–1712), son of Mughal emperor Bahadur Shah
- Mohammad Azharuddin (born 1963), Indian cricketer
- Azharuddin Mohammed Ismail (born 1998), Indian child actor in the film Slumdog Millionaire
