= Majid Husain =

Indian geologist (died 2019)

Dr. Majid Husain
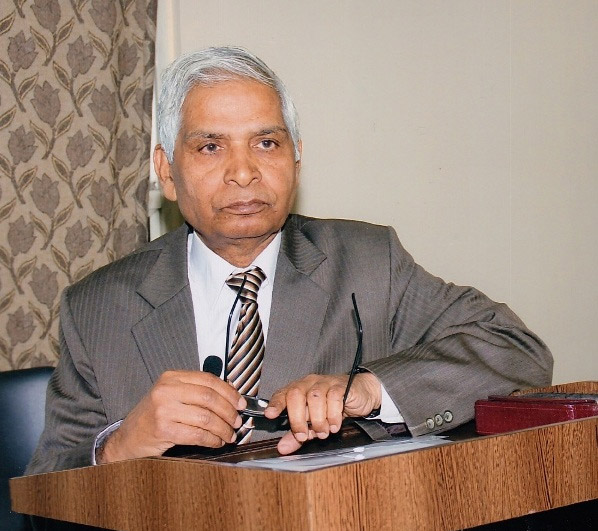
- Majid Husain delivering a lecture at Pragati IAS
- Born: Banhera Tanda, Roorkee, United Provinces, British India
- Died: 24 January 2019
- Known for: Research on geography
- Awards: Bhugol Bhushan Award
- Scientific career
- Fields: Geography, Geomorphology, Geology, Human Geography

Majid Husain (died January 24, 2019) was an Indian geographer known for his contributions to geography.

== Early life ==
Husain was born in Haridwar district of Uttarakhand. He was M.A. In geography (Gold Medalist), an LL.B. and a PhD. He died on 24 January 2019.

== Bibliography ==
Bibliography:

- Models in Geography
- Environment and Ecology: Biodiversity, Climate Change and Disaster Management
- Indian and World Geography
- Geography of India
- Human Geography
- Paryavaran Evam Paristhithiki 5e
- Environment and Ecology: Objective Environment
- Indian Map Entries in Geography For Civil Services Main Examination
- Environment and Ecology: Biodiversity, Climate Change and Disaster Management For Civil Services Examination
- Vasthunisht Paryavaran Evam
- Indian Map Entries For Civil Services Examination
- Geography of India - 9th edition
