= Ahmed Saad Eddine =

Egyptian politician

Deputy Speaker
- Incumbent
- Assumed office January 12, 2021

Personal details
- Occupation: Politician

Ahmed Saad Eddine is an Egyptian politician who has been Deputy Speaker of the House of Representatives alongside Mohamed M. Abou El Enein since 12 January 2021.
