= Sadr al-Din =

Sadr al-Din (Arabic: صدر الدين, Persian: صدرالدین) may refer to:

- Sadr al-Din al-Qunawi (died 1274), Persian Sufi writer
- Sadr al-Dīn Mūsā (1305–1391), leader of the Safaviya order
- Sadr ad-Dīn Abu'l Ḥasan ʿAlī Ibn Abi al-Izz (1331–1390), Syrian Sunni Hanafi jurist and theologian
- Pir Sadardin (14th century), Persian founder of Khoja Ismaili sect
- Sheikh Sadruddin (1434–1515), Jagirdar of Maler in India
- Ṣadr ad-Dīn Muḥammad Shīrāzī, or just Mulla Sadra (c. 1571–1636), Persian Shia Islamic philosopher
- Sadruddin Khan Azurda Dehlawi (1804–1868), Indian Islamic scholar
- Sadreddin Nizamettinovich Maksudov, or Sadri Maksudi Arsal (1878–1957), Tatar and Turkish statesman
- Sadriddin Ayni (1878–1954), Tajik poet, journalist, historian
- Sadr al-Din bin Saleh (late 19th century), Twelver Shi'a religious scholar
- Sadr al-Din al-Sadr (1882–1954) Iraqi ayatollah
- Sadruddin Islahi (1917–1988), Indian poet and activist
- Mehmet Sadrettin Alışık, or just Sadri Alışık (1925–1995), Turkish film actor
- Prince Sadruddin Aga Khan (1933–2003), French Muslim United Nations official
- Ali Sadreddine Bayanouni (born 1938), Syrian active in the Muslim Brotherhood
- Saddaruddin Hashwani (born 1940), Pakistani businessman
- Sadruddin Mohammad Hossain (born 1941), former chief of the Bangladesh Air Force
