= Ahmed bin Saif =

Ahmed Bin Saif is an Arabic given name and middle name, means "Ahmed, son of [a people called] Saif", may refer to:

- Ahmed bin Saif Al Nahyan (born 1967), member of Abu Dhabi royal family
- Ahmed bin Saif Al Thani (born 1946), member of Qatari royal family
