= Riazuddin =

Riazuddin (Arabic: رياض الدين) may refer to:

- Riazuddin (physicist) (1930–2013), Pakistani theoretical physicist
- Riazuddin (umpire) (1958–2019), Pakistani cricket umpire
- Hamza Riazuddin (born 1989), English cricketer
- Riyaz Uddin (painter), Indian miniature painter
- Begum Akhtar Riazuddin (born 1928)
- Shaikh Riazuddin (born 1971), Indian cricketer
- Riaz ud-Din (field hockey) (1942-2001), Pakistani Olympic hockey player
