= Tazehabad-e Amin, Kurdistan =

Tazehabad-e Amin تازه آباد امين
- Village
- Location within Iran
- Coordinates: 35°48′38″N 46°55′24″E
- Country: Iran
- Province: Kurdistan
- County: Divandarreh
- Bakhsh: Saral
- Rural District: Saral

Population (2006)
  - Total: 255
- Time zone: UTC+3:30 (IRST)
  - Summer (DST): UTC+4:30 (IRDT)

Tazehabad-e Amin (Persian: تازه آباد امين, also Romanized as Tāzehābād-e Amīn; also known as Majīd Khān, Tāzehābād-e Majīdkhānī, and Tāzehābād-e Moḩammad-e Amīn) is a village in Saral Rural District, Saral District, Divandarreh County, Kurdistan Province, Iran. At the 2006 census, its population was 255, in 50 families. The village is populated by Kurds.
