= Macit (Turkish name) =

Macit is a Turkish masculine given name and a surname of Arabic origin. It refers to those who are glorious.

Notable people with the name include:

== Given name ==
- Macit Gürdal (1931–date of death unknown), Turkish football player
- Macit Karaahmetoğlu (born 1968), German lawyer and politician of Turkish origin
- Macit Koper (born 1944), Turkish actor
- Macit Özcan (born 1954), Turkish politician
- Macit Sonkan (born 1953), Turkish actor

== Surname ==
- Bilal Macit (born 1984), Turkish politician
