= Saiful Islam =

Saiful Islam or Saif al-Islam (Arabic: سيف الإسلام; "Sword of Islam"), may refer to:

== People ==
- Khalid ibn al-Walid, general and companion to the Islamic prophet Muhammad
- Tughtakin ibn Ayyub, second Ayyubid emir of Yemen and Arabia between 1182 and 1197
- Saiful Islam Khan (1942–2019), Bangladeshi poet and literary critic
- Ahmed Seif El-Islam (1951–2014), Egyptian politician
- Abuhena Saifulislam (born 1963), imam chaplain in the US armed forces
- Saiful Islam (chemist) (born 1963), British chemist
- Saiful Islam (cricketer, born 1969), Bangladeshi cricketer
- Mohammad Saiful Islam (born 1970), Bangladeshi politician
- Saif al-Islam Gaddafi (1972–2026), son of former Libyan leader Muammar Gaddafi
- Saiful Islam Mannu (born 1972), Bangladeshi film director
- Shaiful Islam (born 1983), Bangladeshi cricketer
- Saiful Islam Hiru, Bangladeshi politician
- Saiful Islam (film editor), Bangladeshi film editor
- Saiful Islam Badal, Bangladeshi cinematographer
- Saiful Islam Joarder, Bangladeshi army fugitive
- Saiful Islam Duke, Bangladesh Navy lieutenant commander
- Saiful Islam (Natore politician), Bangladeshi advocate and politician
- Saiful Islam (vice-chancellor), former vice-chancellor of Bangladesh University of Engineering and Technology and AIUB
- Saif al-Islam al-Masri, Egyptian member of al-Qaeda
- Saiful Islam (police officer)

== Other ==
- The Sword of Islam, a 1987 British documentary film
- Sword of Islam (Mussolini), a ceremonial weapon given in 1937 to Benito Mussolini

== See also ==
- Sayf al-Din (disambiguation)
