= Deborah Magid =

American dramatist

- Occupation: playwright

Deborah Magid is a theater artist living in Cleveland, Ohio. Previously a Broadway actor and singer with The Santa Fe Opera, since 2008 her concentration has been largely in the arena of playwriting. Magid is a member of the Cleveland Play House Playwrights Unit, Dobama Theatre' Playwrights Gym, International Centre for Women Playwrights, American Composers Forum, the Dramatists Guild of America, and founder of SWAN Day - CLE.

== Plays ==
- (2015) Rouge Étude or How Sherlock Holmes Became a Misogynist workshop-production at Cleveland Public Theatre Big Box series of new works
- (2013) Jacob’s Ladder Surface produced at Cleveland Public Theatre
- (2013) The Secret Life of Birds produced at Dobama Theatre
- (2012) Cowboy Poet produced at Los Alamos Little Theatre
- (2012) A Tudor Tale produced at Cantores Cleveland
- (2012) The Ring produced at Dobama Theatre
- (2011) Being Earnest produced at Dobama Theatre
- (2011) The Berlioz Project produced at Cleveland Public Theatre
- (2011) Pen Name produced at Dramatists Guild Friday Night Footlights
- (2010) Debate Your Future! produced at Cleveland Museum of Art
- (2010) Descent of a Diva produced at Melbourne Fringe Festival
- (2010) The Consequence of Impression produced at Remy Bumppo Theatre Company
- (2008) Costumbrismo, or Khandihba Wars produced at Cleveland Public Theatre
