= Seifu =

Cocktail containing vodka, club soda and grapefruit juice

- Type: Mixed drink
- Ingredients: 1 part vodka; 1 part club soda; splash of grapefruit juice
- Standard garnish: Lime
- Served: In a glass
- Preparation: TBC

The seifu is a cocktail containing vodka, club soda and grapefruit juice.
