= Mofizul Islam =

Bangladeshi politician

Member of Bangladesh Parliament
- In office 18 February 1979 – 12 February 1982

Personal details
- Born: 12 July 1926; Bakshimul, Burichang thana, British India
- Died: 25 December 1991 (aged 65)
- Political party: Bangladesh Nationalist Party

Mofizul Islam (Bengali: মফিজুল ইসলাম) is a Bangladesh Nationalist Party politician and a former member of parliament for Comilla-13.

== Biography ==
Mofizul Islam was born on 12 July 1926 in Bakshimul village of what is now Burichang Upazila, Comilla District, Bangladesh.

Islam was elected to parliament from Comilla-13 as a Bangladesh Nationalist Party candidate in 1979.

== Death ==
Islam died on 25 December 1991.
