= Water, energy and food security nexus =

Environmental issue

The water, energy and food security nexus according to the Food And Agriculture Organisation of the United Nations (FAO), means that water security, energy security and food security are very much linked to one another, meaning that the actions in any one particular area often can have effects in one or both of the other areas.

These three sectors (water, energy and food security nexus) are necessary for the benefit of human well-being, poverty reduction and sustainable development. As the world population is nearing 8 billion, increasing demands for basic services also rise, such as the growing desires for higher living standards and the need for more conscious stewardship of the vital resources required to achieve those services and these desires have become both more obvious and urgent.

Water-food-energy connections lie at the heart of sustainable, economic and environmental development and protection. The demand for all three resources continues to grow for various reasons: a growing population, ongoing population movements from farms to cities, rising incomes, increased desire to spend those incomes on energy and water intensive goods/varying diets, international trade, urbanization and climate change.

Water being a finite resource, but also the most abundant resource of the three sectors is the most exploited. Water is primarily used in forestry and fishery, agricultural production (in its entire agri-food supply chain) and is used to create and/or transfer energy in varying forms.

In fact, agriculture is the largest user of freshwater, making it responsible for 70% of total global withdrawal, while more than one fourth of energy used worldwide is an input for food production, distribution, and use. In addition, food production and supply chain simultaneously utilize approximately 30% of the total energy that is used globally.

The greater the capacity to pay for improved water, the more it will enable alternative water sources, such as desalination to bring water into urban areas from greater distances, such as desalinated seawater often requiring energy-intensive production and transport methods. Countries, food, water and energy industries, as well as other users can agree that the increasing use of more water, energy and land resources (food) have a great potential to face issues with environmental deterioration and even resource scarcity, as we can already see taking place in some parts of the developing world. The unbroken links between these sectors continues to demand well-integrated plans to protect food and water and food security.

== Definitions ==
- The nexus approach is deemed necessary to design future, inherently interlinked systems from the starting point of planning in a holistic manner. Concepts such as integrated management consider at least one of the systems as an existing system and are therefore different from the nexus approach. This approach identifies the future systems as inherently interconnected. The nexus approach aims to highlight potential synergies and identify critical conflicts to be dealt with.
- Water security has been defined as "the reliable availability of an acceptable quantity and quality of water for health, livelihoods and production, coupled with an acceptable level of water-related risks".
- Energy security has been defined as "access to clean, reliable and affordable energy services for cooking and heating, lighting, communications and productive uses" (United Nations), and as "uninterrupted physical availability [of energy] at a price which is affordable, while respecting environment concerns".
- Food security is defined by the Food and Agriculture Organization (FAO) as "availability and access to sufficient, safe and nutritious food to meet the dietary needs and food preferences for an active and healthy life". Adequate food has also been defined as a human right.

The emphasis on access in these definitions also implies that security is not so much about average (e.g., annual) availability of resources; it has to encompass variability and extreme situations such as droughts or price shocks, and the psychological resilience of the poor.

== Interactions among the water, energy and food security sectors ==
The interactions among water, energy and food are numerous and substantial. Water is used for extraction, mining, processing, refining, and residue disposal of fossil fuels, as well as for growing feedstock for biofuels and for generating electricity. Water intensity varies in the energy sector, with oil and gas production requiring much less water than oil from tar sands or biofuels.

Choosing biofuels for energy production should require a careful balancing of priorities, since water that has been used to grow feedstock for biofuels could also have been used to grow food. Many forms of energy production through fossil fuels are highly polluting in addition to being water intensive, especially extraction from tar sands and shale and extraction through hydraulic fracturing. Further, return flows from power plants to rivers are warmer than the water that was taken in and/or are highly polluted and can consequently compromise other downstream usage, including ecosystems.

Conversely, energy is needed for extracting, transporting, distributing and treating water. Energy intensity for accessing a cubic meter of water varies: logically, accessing local surface water requires far less energy than pumping groundwater, reclaiming wastewater or desalinating seawater. Irrigation is more energy intensive than rain-fed agriculture, and drip irrigation is more intensive yet since the water must be pressurized.

Food production is by far the largest consumer of global fresh water supplies. Globally, agriculture is responsible for an average of 70% of fresh water consumption by humans; in some countries that figure jumps to 80%-90%. Agriculture is therefore also responsible for much of fresh water over-exploitation. Food production further impacts the water sector through land degradation, changes in runoff, disruption of groundwater discharge, water quality and availability of water and land for other purposes such as natural habitat.

The increased yields that have resulted from mechanization and other modern measures have come at a high energy price, as the full food and supply chain claims approximately 30% of total global energy demand. Energy fuels land preparation, fertilizer production, irrigation and the sowing, harvesting and transportation of crops. The links between food and energy have become quite apparent in recent years as increases in the price of oil lead very quickly to increases in the price of food. The energy sector can have other negative impacts on the food sector when mining for fossil fuels and deforestation for biofuels reduce land for agriculture, ecosystems and other uses.

The measurement of the water-energy-food nexus is complex in that the constituent sectors are measured in different units. They also vary both spatially and temporally. One means of measuring a nexus is through the development of a composite indicator or Index (statistics) such as the WEF Nexus Index. The development of a composite indicator normalises the data, thus enabling the constituent indicators (representing water, energy and food) to be aggregated. The water, energy and food pillars within this index are equally weighted, thus emphasizing the multi-centric nature of this framework. The WEF Nexus Index should be utilised as an entry point into the underlying pillars, sub-pillars and indicators, and can be utilised in parallel with other quantitative and qualitative water-energy-food nexus studies. Further, it is complementary to the Sustainable Development Goals in that its access sub-pillars are centred on equitable access to the constituent resources.

== Nexus approach ==
Improved water, energy, and food security on a global level can be achieved through a nexus approach—an approach that integrates management and governance across sectors and scales. A nexus approach can support the transition to a green economy, which aims, among other things, at resource use efficiency and greater policy coherence. Adding value to the agricultural food supply chain require the interdisciplinary management of the critical factors that influence the productive capacities and sustainability of these resources. The globalization of the supply chain and need to manage localized and globalized resources to achieve optimal distribution and use of supplies.

Given the increasing connectivity across sectors and in space and time, a reduction of negative economic, social and environmental externalities can increase overall resource use efficiency, provide additional benefits and secure the human rights to water and food. In a nexus-based approach, conventional policy- and decision-making in "silos" therefore would give way to an approach that reduces trade-offs and builds synergies across sectors.

The European Union, working along with the German Federal Ministry for Economics Cooperation and Development and the International Food Policy Research Institute, the WWF and the World Economic Forum have developed an online resource on this concern. Nexus approach requires an integrated solution.

== Nexus perspective ==
A nexus perspective increases the understanding of the inter-dependencies across the water, energy and food sectors and influences policies in other areas of concern such as climate and biodiversity. The nexus perspective helps to move beyond silos and ivory towers that preclude interdisciplinary solutions, thus increasing opportunities for mutually beneficial responses and enhancing the potential for cooperation between and among all sectors. Everyone in all disciplines needs to think and act from the perspective of being interlinked in order to realize the full impact of both direct and indirect synergies that can result.

A deep understanding of the nexus will provide the informed and transparent framework that is required to meet increasing global demands without compromising sustainability. The nexus approach will also allow decision-makers to develop appropriate policies, strategies and investments, to explore and exploit synergies, and to identify and mitigate trade-offs among the development goals related to water, energy and food security.

Active participation by and among government agencies, the private sector and civil society is critical to avoiding unintended adverse consequences. A true nexus approach can only be achieved through close collaboration of all actors from all sectors. While the opportunities provided by the nexus perspective and the consequent social, environmental and economic benefits are real, implementation requires the right policies, incentives and encouragement, and institutions and leaders that are up to the task, as well as frameworks that encourage empowerment, research, information and education.

Accelerating the involvement of the private sector through establishing and promoting the business case for both sustainability and the nexus is essential to driving change and getting to scale. Nexus perspective can be an option for adaptation to climate change. This article highlights that Nepal can use groundwater resources to irrigate presently non-irrigated land to provide year-round irrigation. This can boost agriculture production and other associated economic benefits.

A water-energy-food (WEF) nexus assessment supports natural resource management by providing an integrated framework for evaluation and decision-making. The participation of a wide range of stakeholders is essential for achieving environmental, economic, and social sustainability in this framework. This analysis supports the decision-making process of the nexus assessment by facilitating dialogue between stakeholders in order to achieve long term efficiencies, especially in rural landscapes where most of the services connected to WEF securities are provided. The lack of communication between the parties is the main threat to the development of the WEF nexus projects.

== Criticism ==
Critics of the application of the nexus concept argue that the integration of water, energy, and food systems is agreeable in theory, but it often remains unclear what the application of the concept means in reality. First of all, there are often disagreements between actors that emphasize economic and those that stress environmental concerns. More importantly, however, some authors consider a discussion of resource access and distribution missing from the nexus debates, contributing to social inequity. If these concerns were not to be addressed, the nexus concept risks turning into an empty shell that merely serves powerful actors to legitimize exclusionary policies.

Additionally, the vagueness and scope of the Nexus presents challenges both conceptually and empirically. Conceptually, the broad scope of the Nexus makes modeling difficult, and currently there is insufficient understandings and systematic tools to create accurate assessments and models. As a result, models employed in nexus research have varied greatly, ranging from life cycle assessments, agent-based models, multi-region input-output models, integrated assessment models, and system dynamics models. Empirically, effective nexus analysis requires intersectional data across diverse temporal and spatial dimensions, however data collection practices often fail to achieve such levels of complexity, forcing analysis to make compromises.

== See also ==
- Water-energy nexus
