= Majid Rafiei =

Iranian cultural manager and journalist

Majid Rafiei (Persian: مجید رفیعی; born in 1981, Tehran) is a cultural manager and journalist. He graduated from Imam Sadeq University in Islamic Studies and Political Science.

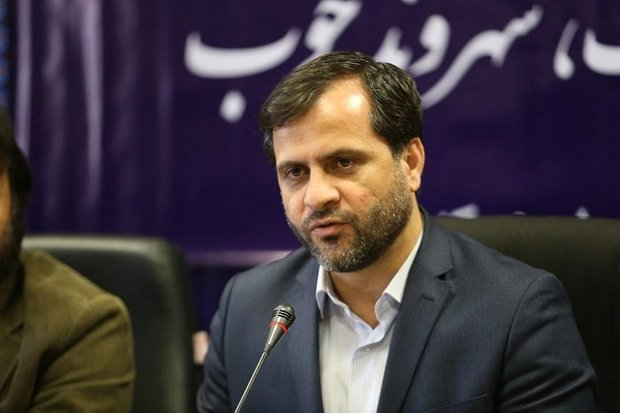
Majid Rafiei, Director General of Foreign News, Mehr News Agency

== Career ==
Rafiei started his career as a journalist in 2005. He later served as editor-in-chief of Hamshahri Mah and Hamshahri Javan, and as managing director of Tehran Emrouz in the field of written media. He also held roles in digital media, including as managing director of Fardanews, CEO of Tabnak news site, and Director General of Foreign News at Mehr News Agency.

He also has managerial experience in Tehran Municipality. He has been the head of the Ibn Sina Cultural Center and the cultural, artistic director of the 2nd district of Tehran Municipality, and the CEO of the Cultural, Social and Sports Organization of Qom Municipality. He is currently the head of the Baladiya (meaning municipality) city hall in Tehran and the advisor to the CEO of Tehran City Beautification Organization.
