= Mohammad Saif =

Mohammad Saif can refer to:

- Mohammad Saif (cricketer, born 1976), Indian cricketer
- Mohammad Saif (cricketer, born 1996), Indian cricketer
- Mohammed Saif (born 1993), Emirati footballer
