= Majid Movaghar =

Persian politician

11th, 12th, 13th, and 16th National Consultative Assembly

Personal details
- Born: 1898 Ahvaz, Iran
- Died: 1968 (aged 69–70) Tehran, Iran
- Occupation: Politicians

Mirza Majid Movaghar (Persian: مجید موقر) (1898–1968) was a Persian politician. He represented Dezful, Khuzestan in the 11th, 12th, 13th, and 16th National Consultative Assembly.
