= Majid Assadi =

Iranian prisoner

Majid Assadi (Persian: مجید اسدی) is an Iranian political prisoner in Gohardasht Prison, Iran. He has been arrested by Intelligence Ministry agents on February 18, 2017. On November 27, Branch 26 of the Tehran Revolutionary Court sentenced him to six years in prison and two years in exile in Borazjan, Bushehr Province for “propaganda against the state” and “assembly and collusion against national security.”

== Arrest ==
Assadi was previously sentenced to four years in prison in March 2010 for “assembly and collusion against national security” by Branch 15 of the Revolutionary Court. He completed the sentence on June 8, 2015.

== Denied treatment ==
Assadi suffers from gastrointestinal diseases, including gastric ulcer and duodenal ulcer, as well as liver cysts, lumbar discs and spinal rheumatism. Despite his medical needs, prison authorities have denied hospital treatment.

== See also ==
- Human rights in the Islamic Republic of Iran
- Evin Prison
- Gohardasht Prison
