= Saiful Alam =

Saiful or Sayful Alam may refer to:

- Saiful Alam (shooter) (born 1968), Bangladeshi Olympic sport shooter
- Saiful Alam (journalist) (born 1956), Bangladeshi journalist
- Saiful Alam Saja, Bangladeshi politician
- Muhammad Sayful Alam, Bangladeshi politician (1934–1997)
- Mohammad Saiful Alam, Bangladesh Army general
