= Majid Rabah =

French footballer (born 1980)

Personal information
- Date of birth: July 25, 1980 (age 46)
- Place of birth: Aix-en-Provence, France
- Height: 1.80 m (5 ft 11 in)
- Position: Midfielder

Team information
- Current team: US Marignane

Senior career*
Years	Team	Apps	(Gls)
1997–1998	Toulon	35	(1)
1998–2000	Marseille	43	(0)
2001-2002	Châteauroux		
2006-2016	US Marignane		
- * Club domestic league appearances and goals as of 20:59, 26 November 2009 (UTC)

Majid Rabah (born July 25, 1980) is a French professional footballer. He currently plays in the Championnat de France amateur for US Marignane.

Rabah played on the professional level in Ligue 2 for Sporting Toulon Var.
