= M. Taher Saif =

Bangladeshi-American mechanical engineer

- Born: Bangladesh
- Known for: Bangladeshi American Mechanical Engineer and University Professor
- Title: Edward William and Jane Marr Gutgsell Professor
- Awards: Engineering Science Medal, Society of Engineering Science, 2020 Warner T. Koiter Medal, American Society of Mechanical Engineers, 2018 National Science Foundation CAREER Award, 1998

Academic background
- Education: BS, Civil Engineering, Bangladesh University of Engineering and Technology; MS, Civil Engineering, Washington State University; PhD, Theoretical & Applied Mechanics, 1993, Cornell University
- Alma mater: Bangladesh University of Engineering and Technology Cornell University
- Thesis: (1993)

Academic work
- Discipline: Mechanical Science and Engineering
- Institutions: University of Illinois Urbana-Champaign
- Website: https://saif.mechse.illinois.edu/

M. Taher A Saif is a Bangladeshi American mechanical engineer. He is the Edward William and Jane Marr Gutgsell Professor at the University of Illinois Urbana-Champaign. He has also been serving as the Grainger Distinguished Chair in Engineering.

== Early life and education ==
Taher Saif studied civil engineering at the Bangladesh University of Engineering and Technology (BUET). He has a master's degree in civil engineering, a doctorate in electrical engineering, and a post-doctoral degree in mechanical engineering.

== Career ==
In 2024, Taher Saif was elected a member of the United States National Academy of Engineering.
