= Majd ad-Din =

Majd ad-Din may refer to:

- Majd al-Din Abu'l Fotuh Ahmad Ghazali (1061 – c. 1123), Persian Sufi writer and preacher
- Majd ad-Dīn Usāma ibn Murshid ibn ʿAlī ibn Munqidh al-Kināni, or more briefly Usama ibn Munqidh (1095–1188), Syrian poet
- Majd ad-Dīn Ibn Athir (1149–1210), Kurdish lexicographer
- Abu-t-Tahir Ibn Ibrahim Majd ud-Din ul-Fairuzabadi (1329–1414), Persian lexicographer
- Majduddin (fl. 1780-90), Indian Muslim theologian
- Majd al-Din Ghazi Dezfuli, Iranian Shia Cleric
- Majed Aldin Ghazal (born 1987), Syrian high jumper
