= Moinuddin Ahmad Art Gallery, Aligarh Muslim University =

Moinuddin Ahmad Art Gallery
- Established: 1928
- Location: Aligarh, Uttar Pradesh, India
- Type: Art gallery
- Founder: Prof. Moinuddin Ahmad
- Owner: Aligarh Muslim University

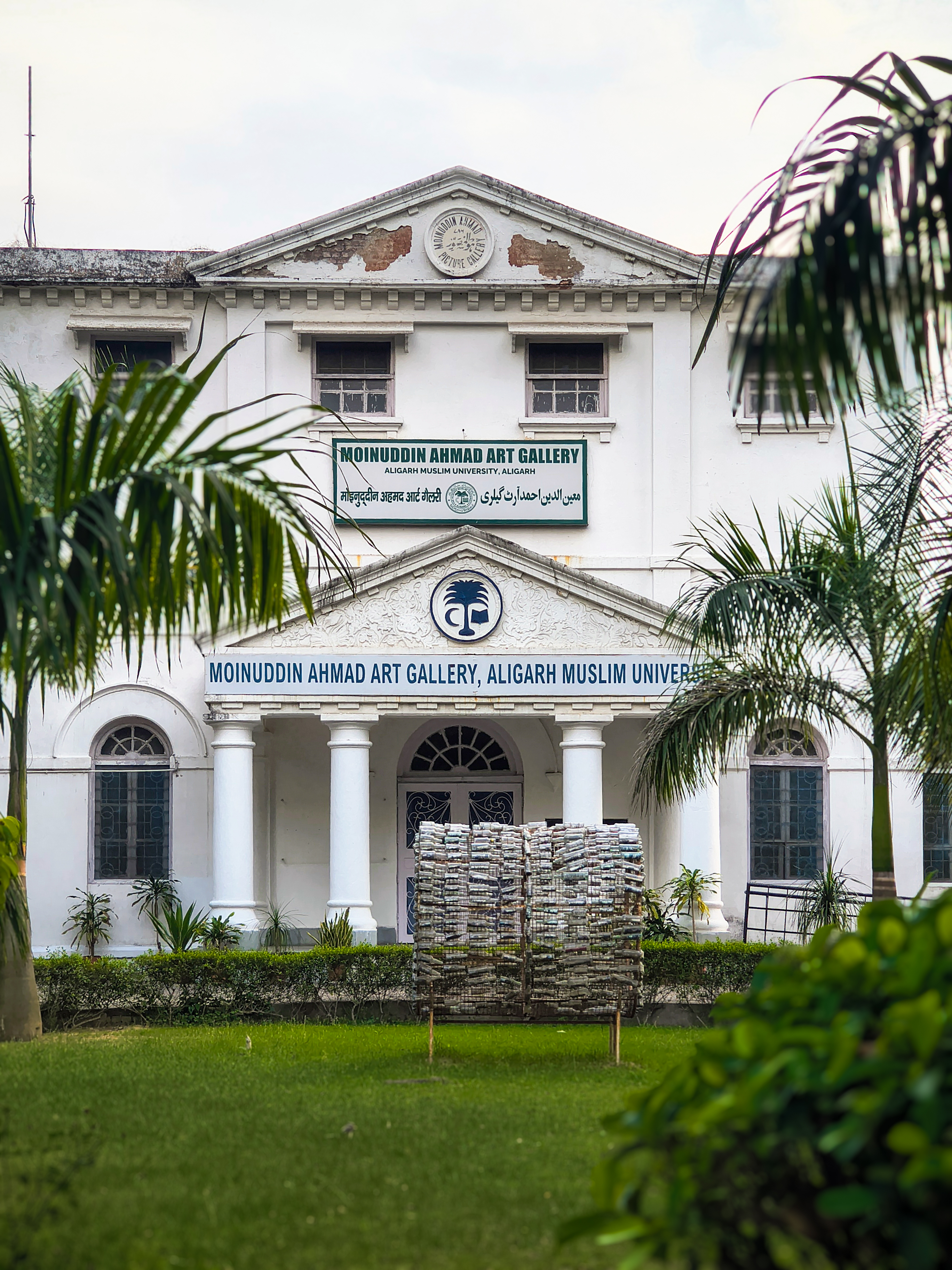
Moinuddin Ahmad Art Gallery, Aligarh Muslim University, 2026

Moinuddin Ahmad Art Gallery, Aligarh Muslim University is the art gallery of Aligarh Muslim University in Aligarh, Uttar Pradesh, India. It has been restored after 80 years.

== History ==
The history of Moinuddin Ahmad Art Gallery begins in the year 1928 when Prof. Moinuddin Ahmad got constructed this Gallery in AMU Campus. His vision was to disseminate the art of painting at Aligarh. On the eve of Sir Syed day 17 October 2013 the gallery was re-inaugurated by Dr. Aziz Quraishi, Governor of Uttrakhand.

== Exhibitions ==
It organized an 'Images of India – a Fascinating Journey through Time' in collaboration with the Indira Gandhi National Centre for the Arts.
