= Majid Soltanpour =

Iranian football player

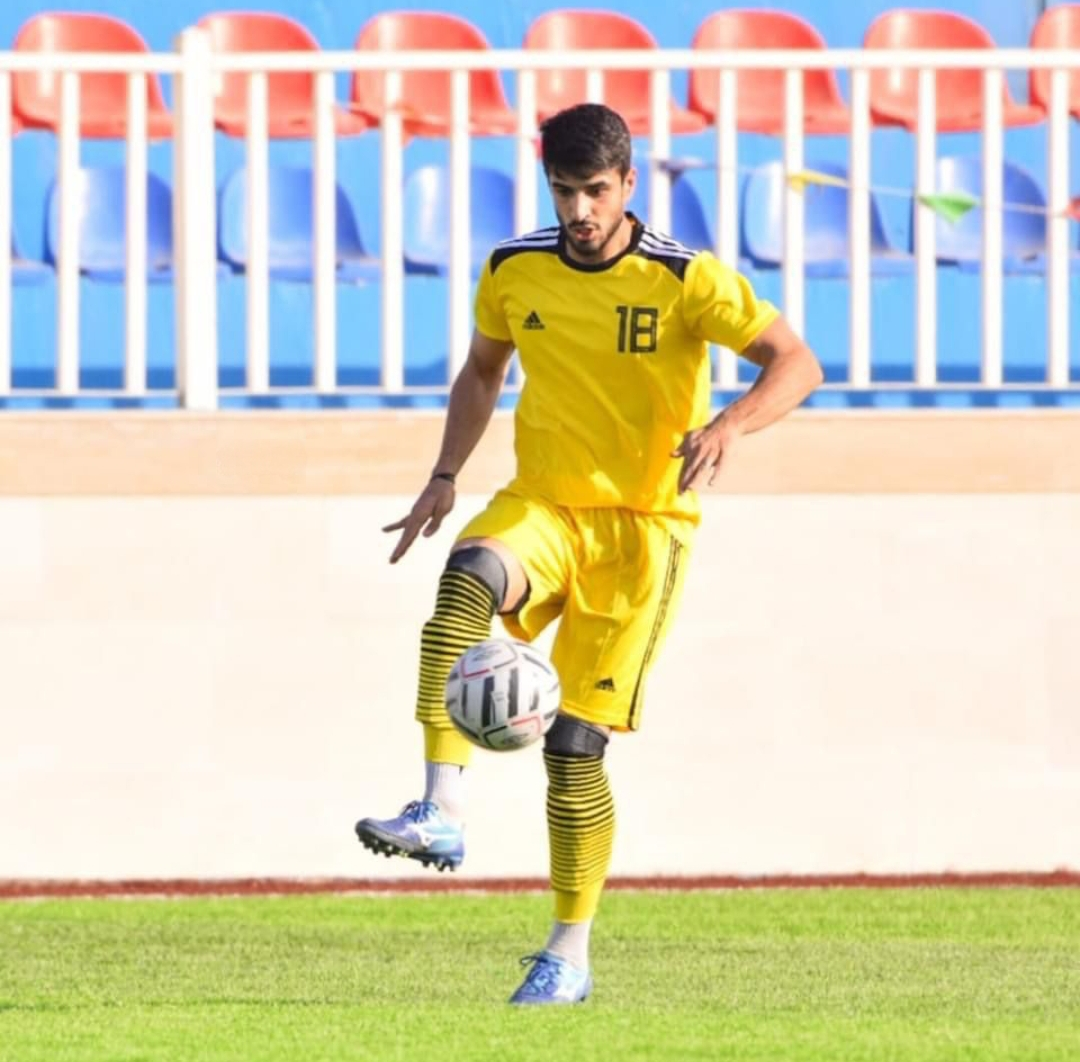

Personal information
- Date of birth: 27 October 1999 (age 27)
- Place of birth: Iran
- Height: 1.83 m (6 ft 0 in)
- Positions: Defensive midfielder; centre-back

Youth career
- 2009–2010: Saipa FC
- 2010–2011: Damash
- 2011–2012: Moghavemat

Senior career*
Years	Team	Apps	(Gls)
2014–2015	Esteghlal	8	(1)
2016–2017	Zagatala	25	(3)
2018–2019	Shahdag Qusar	26	(2)
2020–2021	Nara United	9	(0)
2022–2023	Aliyat Al-Shorta	10	(1)
- * Club domestic league appearances and goals as of 11:00, 26 July 2025 (UTC)

Majid Soltanpour (Persian: مجید سلطانپور; born 27 October 1999) is an Iranian footballer who plays as a defensive midfielder. His career came to a pause in 2024 due to migration as a refugee.
