= Jamal =

Jamal (جمال)
- Pronunciation: Hejaz and Najd: [dʒaˈmaːl] Levant: [ʒaˈmaːl] Tunisia: [ʒæˈmɛːl] Egypt: [ɡæˈmæːl] English: /dʒəˈmɑːl/
- Gender: Male

Origin
- Language: Arabic
- Meaning: Beauty
- Region of origin: Arab world

Other names
- Related names: Djamel, Cemal, Cemil, Jamaal, Džemal, Jamil

Jamaal, Jamal, Jammal, or variants (Arabic: جمال Jamaāl/Jamal ) is an Arabic given name and surname meaning "beauty." It is popular in the Arab and Muslim worlds and among African Americans. Though its usage is typically as a masculine name, it has been used as a given name for women.

== Notable people with the given name Jamal (and variants) ==
=== Jamal ===
- Jamal, stage name of Umaga (wrestler) (1973–2009), Samoan-American professional wrestler
- Jamal A. Khan (born 1934), Pakistani retired air force officer
- Jamal A. Qaiser (born 1972), Pakistani-German author, businessman, and political advisor
- Jamal Abdelmaji Eisa Mohammed (born 1993), Sudanese-born Israeli runner
- Jamal Abdi Dirieh (born 1997), Djiboutian long-distance runner
- Jamal Abdillah (born 1959), Malaysian pop singer and actor
- Jamal Abdul Karim al-Dabban (1939–2007), Iraqi Sunni cleric
- Jamal Abu-Abed (born 1965), Jordanian professional football coach and former player
- Jamal Abu Hamdan (1944–2015), Jordanian writer
- Jamal Abu Samhadana (1963–2006), Palestinian politician
- Jamal Abu-Shamala (born 1987), Palestinian-American former professional basketball player
- Jamal Adams (born 1995), American NFL player
- Jamal ad-Din, several people
- Jamal Aghmani (born 1958), Moroccan politician
- Jamal Agnew (born 1995), American NFL player
- Jamal Ahmad Mohammad Al Badawi (1960/1963–2019), Yemeni al-Qaeda member
- Jamal Ahmed (born 1965), Pakistani politician
- Jamal Ahmed Al-Doseri (born 1970), Bahraini former cyclist
- Jamal Ahsan Khan Isakhel, Pakistani politician
- Jamal Akachar (born 1982), Dutch-Moroccan retired footballer
- Jamal Akal, Canadian criminal
- Jamal Al-Abdullah (born 1963), Qatari sprinter
- Jamal al-Adil, Iraqi politician
- Jamal al-Atassi (1922–2000), Syrian Arab nationalist, politician, and author
- Jamal al Barzinji (1939–2015), Iraqi-American businessman, entrepreneur, and educational reformer
- Jamal al-Din Muhammad (died 1140), Burid atabeg of Damascus
- Jamal Aldin Omar (1960–2020), Sudanese general
- Jamal Al-Gashey (born 1953), Palestinian militant
- Jamal al-Haidari (died 1963), Iraqi politician
- Jamal Al Hajj (born 1971), Lebanese football manager and former player
- Jamal al-Husayni (1894–1982), Palestinian Arab politician
- Jamal Ali (born 1956), Iraqi footballer
- Jamal Alioui (born 1982), French professional football coach and former player
- Jamal Aliyev (born 1993), Azerbaijani cellist
- Jamal al-Jamal (1957–2014), Palestinian diplomat
- Jamal Al-Karboli (born 1965), Iraqi activist and politician
- Jamal Al-Muhaisen (1949–2022), Palestinian politician
- Jamal Al-Qabendi (1959–2021), Kuwaiti footballer
- Jamal Al-Saffar (born 1971), Saudi Arabian sprinter
- Jamal Al Shaer (born 1956), Egyptian activist and author
- Jamal al-Sharabi (1976–2011), Yemeni photojournalist
- Jamal Al Sharif (born 1954), Syrian retired football referee
- Jamal Al Shobaki (born 1952), Palestinian politician and diplomat
- Jamal Amer, Yemeni journalist
- Jamal Amofa (born 1998), Dutch professional footballer
- Jamal Anderson (born 1972), American former NFL player
- Jamal Anwar (born 1990), Pakistani cricketer
- Jamal Arago (born 1993), Ghanaian-born Liberian professional footballer
- Jamal Baban (1893–1965), Iraqi lawyer and politician
- Jamal Badawi, Egyptian-Canadian Islamic author, preacher, and speaker
- Jamal Bajandouh (born 1992), Saudi Arabian professional footballer
- Jamal Bakhshpour (1944–2015), Iranian contemporary painter
- Jamal Baptiste (born 2003), English professional footballer
- Jamal Benomar (born 1957), Moroccan-born British former diplomat
- Jamal Ben Saddik (born 1990), Belgian-Moroccan professional kickboxer
- Jamal Bhuyan (born 1990), Danish professional footballer
- Jamal bin Huwaireb, Emirati historian, governmental cultural advisor, and writer
- Jamal Blackman (born 1993), English professional footballer
- Jamal Boykin (born 1987), American former professional basketball player
- Jamal Branch (born 1992), American professional basketball player
- Jamal Britt (born 1998), American track and field athlete
- Jamal Brooks (born 1976), American former NFL player
- Jamal Cain (born 1999), American NBA player
- Jamal Campbell (born 1993), Canadian CFL player
- Jamal Campbell-Ryce (born 1983), English former professional footballer
- Jamal Carter (born 1994), American UFL player
- Jamal Chandler (born 1989), Barbadian international footballer
- Jamal Charles, several people
- Jamal Chavoshifar (born 1990), Iranian swimmer
- Jamal Crawford (born 1980), American former NBA player
- Jamal Cyrus (born 1973), American conceptual artist
- Jamal Dajani (born 1957), Palestinian-American journalist, producer, and writer
- Jamal Dar (died 1982), Pakistani politician and general
- Jamal Davis II (born 1995), American NFL player
- Jamal Deen Haruna (born 1999), Ghanaian professional footballer
- Jamal Dibi (born 1979), Dutch former professional footballer
- Jamal Duff (born 1972), American actor and former NFL player
- Jamal Easter (born 1987), Welsh former footballer
- Jamal Eddine Dkhissi (1951–2017), Moroccan actor
- Jamal Edwards (1990–2022), English music entrepreneur and DJ
- Jamal Ehsani (1951–1998), Pakistani poet
- Jamal El-Haj (politician) (born 1960), Swedish politician and trade unionist
- Jamal Elshayyal (born 1984), Scottish journalist, correspondent, consultant, and producer
- Jamal Fakhro (born 1956), Bahraini legislator and business advisor
- Jamal Fakir (born 1982), Moroccan rugby league footballer
- Jamal Farhan, Saudi Arabian retired footballer
- Jamal Faulkner (born 1971), American former BBL player
- Jamal Fincher Jones, birth name of Polow da Don (born 1977/78), American record producer and rapper
- Jamal Fogarty (born 1993), Australian NRL player
- Jamal Ford-Robinson (born 1993), English professional rugby union player
- Jamal Fountaine (born 1971), American former NFL player
- Jamal Fyfield (born 1989), English professional footballer
- Jamal Gay (born 1989), Trinidadian former professional footballer
- Jamal Gonzaga (born 2004), Dutch professional footballer
- Jamal Greene, American legal scholar, author, and law professor
- Jamal Hairane (born 1993), Moroccan-born Qatari athlete
- Jamal Hamdan (actor) (born 1958), Lebanese actor and voice actor
- Jamal Harkass (born 1995), Moroccan professional footballer
- Jamal Harrison Bryant (born 1971), American minister, author, and former political candidate
- Jamal Haruna (born 2001), Ghanaian professional footballer
- Jamal Haynes (born 2002), American ACC player
- Jamal Hill (born 1995), American Paralympic swimmer
- Jamal Hill (American football) (born 2001), American NFL player
- Jamal Hinton (born 1999), American who became famous from an accidental Thanksgiving invitation
- Jamal Holtz, American politician and party official
- Jamal Hussein Ali, Iraqi novelist, journalist, and professor
- Jamal ibn Abd Allah Shaykh Umar (died 1868), Islamic scholar and teacher
- Jamal Ibrahim Ashtiwi al Misrati (1969–2011), Libyan al-Qaeda member
- Jamal Idris (born 1990), Australian former professional rugby league footballer
- Jamal Igle (born 1972), American comic book artist, editor, art director, marketing executive, and animation storyboard artist
- Jamal Ismayilov (1984–2020), Azerbaijani armed forces officer
- Jamal Itani (born 1960), Lebanese politician, businessman, and civil servant
- Jamal J. Ahmad Nasir, Jordanian lawyer and writer
- Jamal J. Elias, Pakistani-born American scholar and professor of religious studies
- Jamal Jack (born 1987), Trinidadian footballer
- Jamal Jafarov (born 2002), Azerbaijani professional footballer
- Jamal James (born 1988), American professional boxer
- Jamal Jones (born 1981), American former NFL player
- Jamal Jones (basketball) (born 1993), American professional basketball player
- Jamal Joratli (born 1961), Syrian painter
- Jamal Joseph (born 1953), American writer, director, producer, poet, activist, and educator
- Jamal Jouhar (born 1987), Qatari footballer
- Jamal Jumá, Iraqi poet and writer
- Jamal Kakakhel, Pakistani regional politician, social worker, and chief of his village tribe
- Jamal Kanlıbaeva (1923–1974), Kazakh- and Soviet scientist, engineer, and professor
- Jamal Karimi-Rad (1956–2006), Iranian politician
- Jamal Khan Mandokhail (born 1961), Pakistani judge
- Jamal Khashoggi (1958–2018), Saudi journalist, dissident, columnist, and author who was assassinated
- Jamal Khwaja (1926–2020), Indian philosopher
- Jamal Kiyemba, Ugandan-born British former Guantanamo Bay detainee
- Jamal Kochangadi (born 1944), Indian writer, script writer, lyricist, and music journalist
- Jamal Leghari (born 1966), Pakistani politician
- Jamal Lewis, several people
- Jamal Lowe (born 1994), Jamaican professional footballer
- Jamal Maarouf (born 1975), Syrian rebel leader
- Jamal Maaytah (born 1981), Jordian-German retired professional basketball player
- Jamal Mahjoub (born 1960), English-Sudanese writer
- Jamal Mahmoud (born 1973), Jordanian football manager
- Jamal Malik (born 1956), Pakistani-born German professor of Islamic studies
- Jamal Malyar (born 1992), Pakistani politician and human rights activist; one of the leaders of the Pashtun Tahafuz Movement
- Jamal Manakkadan (born 1961), Indian politician
- Jamal Marshall (born 1993), American former NFL player
- Jamal Mashburn (born 1972), American entrepreneur and former NBA player
- Jamal Mashburn Jr. (born 2001), American AAC player
- Jamal Mayers (born 1974), Canadian former NHL player
- Jamal Michael Barrow, birth name of Shyne (born 1978), Belizean rapper and politician
- Jamal Miles (born 1991), American CFL- and IFL player
- Jamal Millner (born 1971), American guitarist
- Jamal Mirsadeghi (born 1933), Iranian writer
- Jamal Mitchell (died 2024), American victim of the 2024 Minneapolis shooting
- Jamal Mixon (born 1983), American actor
- Jamal Mohamed (disambiguation), several people
- Jamal Morrow (born 1995), American CFL player
- Jamal Moss (born 1986), Bahamian sprinter
- Jamal Moughrabi (born 1957), Syrian former wrestler
- Jamal Mubarak (born 1974), Kuwaiti former footballer
- Jamal Muhammad (disambiguation), several people
- Jamal Murray (born 1997), Canadian NBA player
- Jamal Musiala (born 2003), German professional footballer
- Jamal Mustafa (born 1963), American professional wrestler
- Jamal Mustafa Abdullah (born 1955), Iraqi former prisoner of war
- Jamal Nabi Al-Balushi (born 1981), Omani footballer
- Jamal Naji (1954–2018), Palestinian-born Jordanian author
- Jamal Nasir (born 1954), Malaysian former footballer
- Jamal Nassar, Palestinian-born American academic and educator
- Jamal Nasser (1985–2003), Afghan soldier
- Jamal Nazrul Islam (1939–2013), Bangladeshi mathematical physicist, cosmologist, and professor
- Jamal Nebez (1933–2018), Kurdish linguist, mathematician, politician, author, translator, and writer
- Jamal Nur Qadin (1850–1876), Egyptian Sunni Muslim slave concubine
- Jamal of Hunza (1912–1976), Pakistani monarch
- Jamal Olasewere (born 1991), Nigerian American professional basketball player
- Jamal Omid (born 1946), Iranian author, screenwriter, and film critic
- Jamal Osman, several people
- Jamal Othman (born 1986), Swiss former competitive figure skater
- Jamal Ouariachi (born 1978), Dutch writer
- Jamal Parker (born 1998), American CFL player
- Jamal Pasha Zogolli, alternate name of Xhemal Pasha Zogu (1860–1911), Albanian Muslim governor
- Jamal Perry (born 1994), American NFL player
- Jamal Peters (born 1996), American CFL player
- Jamal Petgrave (born 1997), English international judoka
- Jamal Phillips (born 1979), American rapper and record producer; past member of hip hop duo Illegal (group), and current member of rap supergroup Def Squad
- Jamal Nur Qadin (1850–1876), Egyptian consort
- Jamal Rahimov (born 1987), Azerbaijani equestrian showjumper
- Jamal Raisani, Pakistani politician
- Jamal Rashid (born 1988), Bahraini footballer
- Jamal Rayyan (1953–2026), Palestinian news television anchorman
- Jamal Reiners (born 1998), South African-born Australian professional footballer
- Jamal Reynolds (born 1979), American former NFL player
- Jamal Rhoden-Stevens (born 1994), British sprinter
- Jamal Richards (born 2004), English cricketer
- Jamal Rifi (born 1959), Lebanese-born Australian Sunni Muslim general practitioner
- Jamal Roberts (born 1997), American singer
- Jamal Roberts (American football) (born 2004), American football player
- Jamal Robertson (born 1977), American- and Canadian former NFL- and CFL player
- Jamal Robinson (born 1973), American retired NBA player
- Jamal Robinson (American football) (born 1993), American CFL player
- Jamal Rocker, real name of Mac Mall (born 1975), American rapper
- Jamal Sadat (born 1983), Ethiopian footballer
- Jamal Sadatian (born 1956), Iranian film producer
- Jamal Saeed Abdul Rahim, Pakistani hijacker of the Pan Am Flight 73
- Jamal Said (1965–2012), Pakistani Taliban leader
- Jamal Salih (born 1946), Iraqi former national footballer and coach, and current sports director
- Jamal Salim (born 1995), Ugandan footballer
- Jamal Sampson (born 1983), American former NBA- and CBA player
- Jamal Seeto (born 1990), Papua New Guinean footballer
- Jamal Sellami (born 1970), Moroccan professional football manager and former player
- Jamal Shah (born 1956), Pakistani actor, director, musician, writer, sculptor, painter, and social activist
- Jamal Shah Kakar, Pakistani politician
- Jamal Shead (born 2002), American NBA player
- Jamal Shibasaki (born 2005), Australian NRL player
- Jamal Shipman, American college administrator; contestant on Survivor (American TV series)
- Jamal Shuler (born 1986), American GBL player
- Jamal Simmons, American political advisor
- Jamal Sims, American choreographer, executive producer, and director
- Jamal Smith (born 1984), Barbadian cricketer
- Jamal Sowell, American business executive
- Jamal Strong (born 1978), American former MLB player
- Jamal Suliman (born 1959), Syrian television-, film-, and stage producer, director, and actor
- Jamal Sutton (born 1982), American former MLS- and USL player
- Jamal Taha (born 1966), Egyptian-born Lebanese football manager and former player
- Jamal Taslaq (born 1970), Palestinian-born Italian fashion designer
- Jamal Thiaré (born 1993), Senegalese professional footballer
- Jamal Tirawi (born 1966), Palestinian lawmaker
- Jamal Trulove, American actor
- Jamal-ud-Din Faqir (1952–2016), Pakistani mystic singer
- Jamal-ud-Din Yaqut (died 1240), African Siddi slave-turned-nobleman
- Jamal Uddin Ahmad (1929–2015), Bangladeshi politician and accountant
- Jamal Uddin Ahmed, several people
- Jamal Uddin Siddiqui, Pakistani politician
- Jamal Udeen Al-Harith (1966–2017), English Muslim who reportedly implemented a suicide bombing in Iraq
- Jamal ul-Alam Badr ul-Munir (died 1730s), Indonesian Sultan of Aceh
- Jamal ul-Azam (died 1881), Sultan of Sulu
- Jamal Valizadeh (born 1991), Iranian wrestler
- Jamal Vira (born 1994), Vanuatu cricketer
- Jamal Walton (born 1998), Caymanian sprinter and American football player
- Jamal Watson, American writer and columnist
- Jamal Whitehead (born 1979), American lawyer and district judge
- Jamal Williams (born 1976), American former NFL player
- Jamal Willingham, real name of Pimpin', American past member of hip hop group Dem Franchize Boyz
- Jamal Willis (born 1972), American Mormon leader and former NFL player
- Jamal Wilson (born 1988), Bahamian high jumper
- Jamal Woods (born 1999), American CFL- and NFL player
- Jamal Woolard (born 1975), American actor, rapper, and comedian
- Jamal Yagoobi, Iranian-American mechanical engineer and professor
- Jamal Yassine, Lebanese-Egyptian composer, music producer, and singer
- Jamal Young (born 1991), American college football player
- Jamal Yusupov (born 1983), Russian-born Turkish kickboxer and Muay Thai fighter
- Jamal Zahalka (born 1955), Arab-Israeli politician
- Jamal Zarugh, Libyan volleyball player
- Jamal Zougam (born 1973), Moroccan suspect of the 2004 Madrid train bombings

=== Jamall ===
- Jamall Broussard (born 1981), American former NFL player
- Jamall Bufford, real name of Buff1, American rapper and songwriter
- Jamall Emmers (born 1989), American mixed martial artist
- Jamall Johnson (born 1982), American actor and former CFL player
- Jamall Lee (born 1987), Canadian former CFL player
- Jamall Walker (born 1977), American basketball coach

=== Jammal ===
- Jammal Brown (born 1981), American former NFL player
- Jammal Lord (born 1981), American former AFC player
- Jammal Shahin (born 1988), English former footballer

== Notable people with the surname Jamal (and variants) ==
=== Surname ===
- Ahmad Jamal (1930–2023), American jazz pianist and composer
- Ahmed Jamal (disambiguation), several people
- Amir H. Jamal (1922–1995), Tanzanian Minister of Finance
- Ammar Jemal (born 1987), Tunisian footballer
- Joel Jammal, founder of Turning Point Australia in 2023
- Jules Jammal (1932–1956), Syrian military officer
- Khan Jamal (1946–2022), American musician
- Maher Jamal, Syrian politician
- Noel Jammal (born 1990), Lebanese race car driver
- Razane Jammal (born 1987), Lebanese actress
- Sophie Jamal (born 1966), Canadian scientific fraudster
- Lamine Yamal (born 2007), Spanish footballer

== Fictional characters ==
- Jamal, in the 2008 platform video game Sonic Unleashed
- Jamal Al-Fayeed, in the US political drama TV series Tyrant, played by Ashraf Barhom
- Jamal Cudahy, in the US TV soap opera All My Children, played by Jimmy Wiggins, Amir Williams, and Marcus Patrick
- Jamal Grant, in the US TV sitcom City Guys, played by Wesley Jonathan
- Jamal Jenkins, in the US children's mystery TV series Ghostwriter, played by Sheldon Turnipseed
- Jamal Lyon, in the US musical drama Empire, played by Jussie Smollett
- Jamal Malik, in the 2008 UK drama film Slumdog Millionaire, played by Dev Patel
- Jamal Wallace, in the 2000 US drama film Finding Forrester, played by Rob Brown
- Jamaal, in the Herb and Jamaal comic strip

== See also ==
- Mumia Abu-Jamal (born Wesley Cook, 1954), American convict
- Jamal ad-Din (disambiguation)
- Jamaal
- Jamahl
- Jamali (given name)
- Djamel
