= Djamal =

Djamal is an Arabic masculine given name and a surname. It may refer to:

- Djamel Abdoun (born 1986), Algerian footballer
- Djamal Amrani (born 1935), Algerian poet
- Djamal Mahamat (born 1983), Libyan footballer
- Djamal Mohamed (born 1990), French-born Comorian footballer

== See also ==
- Jamal
- Jamaal
- Gamal
- Džemal
