= Jamal (disambiguation) =

Jamal is an Arabic male given name.

Jamal may also refer to:

- Jamal (wrestler) (1973–2009), Samoan professional wrestler
- Jamal (band), Polish reggae raggamuffin and hip-hop duo from Radom
- Jamal (rapper), American rapper and music producer
- Jamal Cave, an archaeological site in Israel
- Jamaican Movement for the Advancement of Literacy
- Tatra T 163 Jamal, heavy duty truck
- Feast of Jamál ("Beauty"), the first day of the third month in the calendar of the Baháʼí Faith
- Jamal, a fictional character portrayed by Karan Aanand in the 2015 Indian film Baby
- Passinho do Jamal, Brazilian dance which went viral in mid-2020s, as well as its namesake (Jamal, real name Romero Silva Oliveira Júnior)

== See also ==
- Jamali (disambiguation)
- Gamal (disambiguation)
