= Kishor Wasan =

Canadian pharmacologist

Kishor M. Wasan
- Occupations: Pharmacologist, pharmacist and professor

Academic background
- Education: University of Texas at Austin (B.Sc., 1985); University of Texas Graduate School of Biomedical Sciences at Houston (Ph.D., 1993)
- Doctoral advisor: Gabriel Lopez Berenstein

Academic work
- Main interests: Lipid-based drug delivery and the interaction between lipoprotein and pharmaceuticals

Kishor M. Wasan is a Canadian pharmacologist, pharmacist and professor. He was the dean of the University of Saskatchewan's College of Pharmacy and Nutrition from 2014 to 2019 and associate dean of research and graduate studies at the Faculty of Pharmaceutical Sciences at the University of British Columbia (UBC) from 2011 to 2014. Previously at UBC, he was chair of pharmaceutics and national director of the Canadian Summer Student Research Program after first joining the faculty in 1995. Wasan's research focuses on lipid-based drug delivery and the interaction between lipoprotein and pharmaceuticals. He has published more than 550 peer-reviewed articles and abstracts and has received over 25 prestigious awards. He is a founding member and co-director of UBC's Neglected Global Diseases Initiative. Dr. Wasan recently received the 2025 MD Anderson Cancer Center Distinguished Alumnus Award and the 2025 CSPS Life Time Achievement Award. Dr. Wasan is a UBC Distinguished University Scholar. Dr. Kishor Wasan Family was named family of the Year by the Knights of Columbus in June 2026 for their Prostate Cancer Awareness Work.

== Early life and family ==
Kishor M. Wasan's parents were both academics. His mother was a physician and his father, Madanlal T. Wasan (1930–2005), was a professor at Queen's University in Ontario. He showed interest in science from a young age and would "hang out in their labs asking questions about why and how things happened".

== Education and career ==
Wasan graduated with a Bachelor of Science in pharmacy from University of Texas at Austin in 1985. He then served as a decentralized hospital pharmacist for several years before beginning work on his doctorate under the tutelage of Gabriel Lopez Berenstein. In 1993, Wasan earned his Ph.D. in cellular and molecular pharmacology at the University of Texas Graduate School of Biomedical Sciences at Houston. He then completed a one-year post-doctoral fellowship on lipoprotein biochemistry at the Cleveland Clinic.

Wasan joined the faculty of the University of British Columbia in Vancouver in 1995 and earned tenure as an associate professor in 2000. Wasan was also chair of pharmaceutics and, in 2001, created the Canadian Summer Student Research Program for undergraduate pharmacy students at UBC. He served as national director of the program which was funded by the Merck Company Foundation. He was associate editor of the Journal of Pharmacy & Pharmaceutical Sciences and served on the editorial board of several other journals.

In 2009, he was named the CIHR/iCo Therapeutics Research Chair in Drug Delivery for Neglected Global Diseases, a joint project by the Canadian Institutes of Health Research (CIHR) and iCo Therapeutics. He is a founding member of UBC's Neglected Global Diseases Initiative, a program he co-directs with Richard Lester.

In September 2011, Wasan succeeded Helen Burt as associate dean of research and graduate studies at UBC's Faculty of Pharmaceutical Sciences. He was appointed dean of the University of Saskatchewan's College of Pharmacy and Nutrition in 2014. He served in the position until June 2019, when he was succeeded by Jane Alcorn.

Dr. Kishor Wasan and his family were named the 2026 Family of the Year by the Knights of Columbus Denis Mahoney Council #8215 in Saskatoon. They were recognized for their active community service and collaborative support for local health initiatives, including prostate cancer awareness and donations.

== Awards, honours, and other memberships ==
Wasan is a member of the Canadian Society for Pharmaceutical Sciences (CSPS) and served as treasurer of the society in 2001–2002. He was later an at-large member of the CSPS board of directors in 2006–2010 and 2012–2014. In 2011, he was recognized with the CSPS Leadership Award for "outstanding contributions to Pharmaceutical Sciences in Canada". Wasan has been a fellow of the Canadian Academy of Health Sciences since 2010. In October 2026 at the AAPS PharmSci360 Conference Dr. Wasan as part of the LSU DeepDrug Team was awarded the Louisiana State Biotechnology Innovation Award for their AI COVID-19 Drug Discovery and Safety Research. https://x.com/NGDIUBC1/status/2114002184962797945

== Selected bibliography ==
Wasan's research focuses on neglected diseases, lipid-based drug delivery and the interaction between lipoprotein and pharmaceuticals. He has published more than 550 peer-reviewed articles and abstracts. A selection of his written work is listed below:

=== Journal articles ===
- Wasan, Kishor M.; Cassidy, Shawn M. (April 1998). "Role of Plasma Lipoproteins in Modifying the Biological Activity of Hydrophobic Drugs". Journal of Pharmaceutical Sciences. 87 (4): 411–424. Bibcode:1998JPhmS..87..411W. doi:10.1021/js970407a. PMID 9548892.
- —; Lundberg, B. B.; et al. (January 2003). "A lipophilic paclitaxel derivative incorporated in a lipid emulsion for parenteral administration". Journal of Controlled Release. 86 (1): 93–100. doi:10.1016/S0168-3659(02)00323-1. PMID 12490375.
- —; Chung, Nancy S. (May 7, 2004). "Potential role of the low-density lipoprotein receptor family as mediators of cellular drug uptake". Advanced Drug Delivery Reviews. Advances in lipid-based drug solubilization and targeting. 56 (9): 1315–1334. doi:10.1016/j.addr.2003.12.003. PMID 15109771.
- —; Van Raalte, Daniel H.; et al. (September 1, 2004). "Peroxisome Proliferator-Activated Receptor (PPAR)-α: A Pharmacological Target with a Promising Future". Pharmaceutical Research. 21 (9): 1531–1538. doi:10.1023/B:PHAM.0000041444.06122.8d. PMID 15497675. S2CID 24728859.
- —; Goss, P.E.; et al. (May 2005). "The influence of letrozole on serum lipid concentrations in postmenopausal women with primary breast cancer who have completed 5 years of adjuvant tamoxifen (NCIC CTG MA.17L)". Annals of Oncology. 16 (5): 707–715. doi:10.1093/annonc/mdi158. PMID 15817595.
- —; Honer, William G.; et al. (February 2, 2006). "Clozapine Alone versus Clozapine and Risperidone with Refractory Schizophrenia". New England Journal of Medicine. 354 (5): 472–482. doi:10.1056/NEJMoa053222. hdl:10722/45303. PMID 16452559.
- —; Constantinides, Panayiotis P. (February 1, 2007). "Lipid Formulation Strategies for Enhancing Intestinal Transport and Absorption of P-Glycoprotein (P-gp) Substrate Drugs: In vitro/In vivo Case Studies". Journal of Pharmaceutical Sciences. 96 (2): 235–248. Bibcode:2007JPhmS..96..235C. doi:10.1002/jps.20780. PMID 17051593.
- —; Brocks, Dion R.; et al. (January 2008). "Impact of lipoproteins on the biological activity and disposition of hydrophobic drugs: implications for drug discovery". Nature Reviews Drug Discovery. 7 (1): 84–99. doi:10.1038/nrd2353. PMID 18079757. S2CID 1989187. Archived from the original on March 19, 2022.
- —; Leon, Carlos G.; et al. (August 1, 2008). "Discovery and Development of Toll-Like Receptor 4 (TLR4) Antagonists: A New Paradigm for Treating Sepsis and Other Diseases". Pharmaceutical Research. 25 (8): 1751–1761. doi:10.1007/s11095-008-9571-x. PMC 2469272. PMID 18493843.
- —; Wasan, Ellen K.; et al. (August 2009). "Highly Effective Oral Amphotericin B Formulation against Murine Visceral Leishmaniasis". The Journal of Infectious Diseases. 200 (3): 357–360. doi:10.1086/600105. PMID 19545212.

=== Book chapters ===
- Wasan, Kishor M.; Lopez-Berestein, Gabriel (July 22, 1998). "The Development of Liposomal Amphotericin B: An Historical Perspective". In Lasic, D. D.; Papahadjopoulos, D. (eds.). Medical Applications of Liposomes. Elsevier. pp. 165–180. ISBN 978-0-08-053608-8.
- —; Wasan, Ellen K. (April 5, 2006). "Utilizing Lymphatic Transport in Enhancing the Delivery of Protein and Peptide Drugs to Metastatic Tumors". In Torchilin, Vladimir P. (ed.). Delivery Of Protein And Peptide Drugs In Cancer. World Scientific. pp. 285–307. ISBN 978-1-78326-000-3.

=== Books edited ===
- Wasan, Kishor M. (January 9, 2007). Role of Lipid Excipients in Modifying Oral and Parenteral Drug Delivery: Basic Principles and Biological Examples. John Wiley & Sons. ISBN 978-0-470-09797-7.
- —; Davies, Neal M. (March 23, 2018). Pharmacokinetics and Drug Metabolism in Canada: The Current Landscape. MDPI. ISBN 978-3-03842-797-1.
