= Gamal =

Gamal (Arabic: جمال) is a masculine given name of Arabic origin. Notable people with this name include:

== Given name ==
- Gamal Abdel-Hamid (born 1957), Egyptian football manager and player
- Gamal Abdel-Rahim (1924–1988), Egyptian classical music composer and composition professor
- Gamal Ahmed Abdulla (born 1964), Egyptian field hockey player
- Gamal El-Araby (born 1954), Egyptian politician
- Gamal Awad (1955–2004), Egyptian squash player
- Gamal Aziz (born 1957/58), Egyptian business executive, indicted as part of the 2019 college admissions bribery scandal
- Gamal al-Banna (1920–2013), Egyptian author and trade unionist
- Gamal Abdel Chasten, American poet and playwright
- Gamal Eid (born 1964), Egyptian human rights activist and lawyer
- Gamal Esmat (born 1956), Egyptian medical doctor and academic
- Gamal Fahnbulleh (born 1982), British broadcast journalist and presenter
- Gamal Fathy (born 1985), Egyptian sabre fencer
- Gamal Al-Ghandour (born 1957), Egyptian referee
- Gamal Amin Abdel Ghani (born 1963), Egyptian field hockey player
- Gamal al-Ghitani (1945–2015), Egyptian author
- Gamal Hamdan (1928–1993), Egyptian geographer and scholar
- Gamal Hamza (born 1981), Egyptian footballer
- Gamal Haress (1925–2019), Egyptian equestrian
- Gamal Mohamed Hassan (born 1978), Somali politician and diplomat
- Gamal Helal (born 1954), Egyptian-American interpreter and diplomat
- Gamal Khashaba, Egyptian scout
- Gamal Kotb (1931–2016), Egyptian visual artist
- Gamal El-Din El-Koumy (born 1958), Egyptian boxer
- Gamal Lineveldt (1919–1942), South African serial killer and rapist
- Gamal Mohamed (wrestler) (1999–2026), Egyptian freestyle wrestler
- Gamal Fawzi Mohamed (born 1966), Egyptian field hockey player
- Gamal Mubarak (born 1963), Egyptian politician
- Gamal Abdel Nasser (1918–1970), Egyptian president
- Gamal El-Nazer (1930–2006), Egyptian water polo player
- Gamal Nkrumah (1958–2026), Ghanaian journalist
- Gamal Refai-Ahmed (born 1963), Egyptian-Canadian-American engineer
- Gamal El-Din Sabri (1915–??), Egyptian basketball player
- Gamal El-Sagini (1917–1977), Egyptian sculptor, painter, and medalist
- Gamal Salama (1945–2021), Egyptian songwriter
- Gamal Salem (1918–1968), Egyptian military officer
- Gamal Belal Salem (born 1978), Qatari runner
- Gamal El-Din El-Sherbini (1923–1995), Egyptian athlete
- Gamal Yafai (born 1991), British boxer

== Surname ==
- Amr Gamal, (born 1991) Egyptian footballer
- Mazen Gamal (born 1986), Egyptian squash player
- Raghda Gamal, Yemeni journalist and poet

== Other ==
- Gimel, a letter known as gamal in Syriac
- Gamal, a name for Jamal Cave in Israel

== See also ==
- Jamaal
- Jamal
- Sharif El-Gamal (born 1973), New York City real estate developer
- Taher Elgamal (born 1955), Egyptian cryptographer
