= Jamali =

Jamali may refer to:

== Places ==
- Jamali, Shiraz, a village in Fars Province, Iran
- Jamali, South Khorasan, a village in South Khorasan Province, Iran
- Jamali, North Karelia, a village in North Karelia Province, Finland

== Other uses ==
- Jamali family, Pakistani political family of Balochis
- Jamali (band), a South African female musical group
- Jamali (artist), a New York-based artist
- Jamali (given name)
- Jamali (surname)

== See also ==
- Dera Murad Jamali, a city in Pakistan
- Jamali Colony, a neighbourhood of Gulshan Town in Karachi, Pakistan
- Jamali Noorpur, a Union Council of Khushab District in Pakistan
