= Ujhana =

Administrative block in northern Haryana, India

Ujhana ज्याणा उझाणा
- Administrative Block
- Location in Haryana, India Ujhana (India)
- Coordinates: 29.7155164°N 76.1340952°E
- Country: India
- State: Northern Haryana
- District: Jind
- Sub-District: Narwana
- Establishment: ~1700 CE

Government
  - Type: Panchayati Raj System
  - Body: Block (district subdivision)

Area
  - Total: 2.11 km^{2} (0.81 sq mi)

Dimensions
  - Length: 2.42 km (1.50 mi)
  - Width: 1.67 km (1.04 mi)
- Elevation: 225 m (738 ft)

Population (2011)
  - Total: 11,696
- Demonym(s): बांगरू, ज्याणिया-ज्याणिनी

Languages
  - Official: Hindi
  - Regional: Haryanvi; Puadhi
- Time zone: UTC+5:30 (IST)
- PIN: 126116
- Area code: +91-01684-XXXXXX
- Geocode: 29°43'03.7"N 76°08'01.0"E
- ISO 3166 code: IN-HR
- Vehicle registration: HR32
- Website: jind.gov.in

Ujhana is an administrative block in the district of Jind, northern Haryana, based near the Haryana-Punjab border along the National Highway 52.

== Overview ==
Ujhana was established around 1700 CE by Maliks, Chahals, and Gills. Sinhmar (Kaler) migrated at a later date.

It is a well-connected and self-sufficient block, offering essential facilities to its residents, including

- Banks
- BDPO (Block Development and Panchayat Office)
- Boating Lake
- Botanical Nursery
- Community Health Centre
- Community Gym
- Grain Market
- Gym
- Libraries
- Sarpanch Office
- Schools
- Stadium
- Veterinary Hospital
- Waterworks, et cetera

Additionally, a public electric power station has been administratively approved.

A key landmark in Ujhana is the seven-story Thaai (Chaupal), built in the 1970s by six neighboring villages: Ambarsar, Dhundua, Koyal, Kurar, Nepewala, and Ujhana. It serves as a meeting place and symbolizes kinship among the surrounding communities.

Ujhana's economy is primarily sustained by agriculture. The Barwala Branch Canal, a sub-branch of the Sirsa branch of Western Yaumna Canal, serves the village, which supplies water from the Sutlej River, supporting its agricultural and other needs. The main temple, Ashan, believed to be around 400 years old, is dedicated to Baba Khak Nath, a saint with ten samadhis in India and the living samadhi is in Nepal.

The indigenous population predominantly comprises the Jat community, with various clans, including Chahal, Gill, Malik, and Sinhmar.

== Villages in Ujhana Block ==
Ujhana Block consists of 22 villages, which are:

Alphabetically Arranged.

1. Ambarsar (Amritsar)
2. Belarkha
3. Chak Ujhana
4. Data Singhwala
5. Dhabi Teksingh
6. Dhamtan Sahib
7. Dhanauri
8. Dhindoli
9. Garhi
10. Hamirgarh
11. Hans Dahar
12. Kalwan
13. Kharal
14. Koel (Koyal)
15. Loan
16. Naraingarh
17. Nepewala
18. Padarath Khera
19. Pipaltha
20. Rasidan
21. Rewar
22. Ujhana

== Notable people ==
Alphabetically Arranged.

=== Soldiers & War Heroes ===
Serial	Name	Parent	Service Classification	War/Operation
1	Abheram	Kundan Sharma	Martyr	1965 Indo-Pak War
2	Amrit	Basanta Gill	Vir Chakra	1971 Indo-Pak War
3	Balbir Singh	Sher Singh Chahal	Served	1971 Indo-Pak War
4	Bhira Ram	Harchand	Served	1971 Indo-Pak War
5	Dalip Singh	Ramkishan Chahal	Served	1971 Indo-Pak War
6	Ramswarup Subedar	Chotu Ram	Served	1965 Indo-Pak War & 1971 Indo-Pak War
7	Santram Sharma	Fakir Chand	Served	1971 Indo-Pak War
8	Sarendutt Sharma	Bhajna Ram	Served	1965 Indo-Pak War & 1971 Indo-Pak War
9	Shivkumar	Sohlu Ram Sharma	Served	1971 Indo-Pak War
10	Sunder	Amilal	Served	1965 Indo-Pak War & 1971 Indo-Pak War

=== Administrative & Political Figures ===
Serial	Name	Parent	Designation
1	Anirudh Sharma	Ved Prakash	HCS, and Allied
2	Dina Nath Sharma	Fakir Chand	BDPO (Block Development and Panchayat Office)
3	Gauri Shankar Singhal		1972 INC MLA, Narwana
4	Gopinath Gupta	Bhagta Ram	DFO (Divisional Forest Officer)
5	Kuldeep Singh Chahal	Sadhu Ram Chahal	2009 Batch IPS Officer
6	Malkha Chahal		
7	Pawan Sharma	Rameshwar Dutt	2015 BJP MLA, Uttam Nagar Delhi
8	Radhe Shyam Sharma	Gordhan Sharma	Ex-Vice Chancellor, CDLU Sirsa
9	Ram Singh	Jaikaran Saini	Superintendent, Old Writ Branch, Office of The Advocate General, Haryana
10	Singhu Bhedi		

=== Sports Personalities ===
Serial	Name	Parents	Sport	Event & Achievement
1	Manjeet Singh Chahal	Bimala Devi & Randhir Singh Chahal	Athletics (800m, 1500m)	1. 2018 Asian Games (800m Gold Medal); 2. 2013 Asian Athletics Championships (800m Participant 4th Position)

== Biodiversity ==
1. iNaturalist Log
