= 2000 Ramallah lynching =

Killing of two Israeli military reservists in the West Bank

Coordinates: 31.9050°N 35.2044°E

- Part of Second Intifada
- Aziz Salha, one of the perpetrators, waving his blood-stained hands from the police station window.
- Location: Ramallah, Israeli-occupied West Bank
- Date: 12 October 2000; 26 years ago
- Attack type: Lynching
- Deaths: 2
- Injuries: 13
- Victims: Vadim Norzhich and Yosef Avrahami
- Perpetrators: Aziz Salha and Wisam Radi

The 2000 Ramallah lynching was an attack that took place early during the Second Intifada on 12 October 2000 in the Israeli-occupied West Bank, when a Palestinian crowd of passing funeral marchers broke into a Ramallah police station and killed two Israeli military reservists and then mutilated their bodies.

The incident occurred during a funeral for a Palestinian, Khalil Zahran, who had been killed by Israeli forces two days earlier. The two Israeli military reservists, Vadim Nurzhitz and Yossi Avrahami, had accidentally entered the Palestinian Authority-controlled city of Ramallah in the West Bank, and were taken into custody. 13 policemen were injured while trying to stop the assault.

Tensions had been escalating prior to the incident; over 100 Palestinians, two dozen of them children, had been killed by Israeli forces in the preceding two weeks; the escalating violence had been condemned five days beforehand by United Nations Security Council Resolution 1322.

== Victims ==
Yosef "Yossi" Avrahami (Hebrew: יוסי אברהמי; Hebrew pronunciation: [josi avʁahami]) was a 38-year-old chief sergeant and toy salesman. He was born in Ramla and moved to Petah Tikva following his service in the Israeli Artillery Corps. He had a wife and three children.

Vadim Nurzhitz (Hebrew: ואדים נורז'יץ, Russian: Вадим Нуржиц; Russian pronunciation: [vɐdʲim nurʐɨts]) was a 33-year-old corporal and truck driver. He was born in Irkutsk and made aliyah in 1990 after learning Hebrew. He lived in Rehovot and Netanya before eventually settling down with his parents in Or Akiva. He married his neighbor a week before his death.

== Lynching ==
Nurzhitz set out at 7 a.m. in his Ford Escort, picked up Avrahami and phoned his father at 9 a.m., stating that he had been ordered to turn up at an army base near the Israeli settlement of Beit El.

The two reservist drivers made their way in a civilian vehicle towards their unit's assembly point near the settlement of Beit El. They had little army experience, were unfamiliar with the West Bank road system and drove through the military checkpoint outside Beitunia and headed straight into the Palestinian town of Ramallah 2 miles east of the checkpoint.

Reaching a Palestinian Authority roadblock, where previously Israeli soldiers had been turned back, the reservists were detained by PA policemen and taken to the local police station at Ramallah's twin city Al-Bireh, not far from Arafat's headquarters. The arrest and detention coincided with the conclusion of a funeral service, attended by thousands of mourners, for Palestinian Khalil Zahran who had been killed by Israeli forces two days earlier. Tensions were running high: over 100 Palestinians, nearly two dozen of them children, had been killed by Israeli forces in the preceding two weeks during protests in Ramallah, and four days earlier, the badly beaten body of 36 year old Palestinian Issam Hamad had been dumped outside of the city after being run over by a car, an autopsy revealed. His death, according to Marwan Bishara of Al Jazeera, was attributed by locals to settlers in Halamish.

Rumors quickly spread that Israeli undercover agents were in the building, and an angry crowd of more than 1,000 Palestinians gathered in front of the station calling for the death of the Israelis. Word that two soldiers were held in a Ramallah police station reached Israel within 15 minutes. According to Roni Shaked, the IDF itself thought initially that the two must have been "undercover agents". According to the Ramallah station chief, there were 21 policemen in the building, some of whom were cooks and administrative personnel, since many policemen had been dispersed throughout the city to control the crowd during the funeral. The IDF decided against a rescue operation. Soon after, Palestinian rioters stormed the building, overcame the Palestinian police and murdered and mutilated both soldiers. Both Haaretz and Maariv reported that approximately 13 Palestinian policemen were injured while attempting to stop the lynching. Jamal Tirawi, the Palestinian Intelligence chief at the Mukata'a nearby, only intervened hours after the second soldier lay dying.

The Israeli reservists were beaten and stabbed. At this point, a Palestinian (later identified as Aziz Salha), appeared at the window, displaying his blood-soaked hands to the crowd, which erupted into cheers. The crowd clapped and cheered as one of the soldier's bodies was then thrown out the window and stamped and beaten by the frenzied crowd. One of the two was shot and set on fire, and his head was beaten. Soon after, the crowd dragged the two mutilated bodies to Al-Manara Square in the city center and began an impromptu victory celebration. Police officers tried to confiscate footage from reporters.

== Reactions and military response ==
The brutality of the murders shocked the Israeli public, intensifying Israeli distrust of Palestinian Authority Chairman Yasser Arafat. The event also deeply damaged the Israeli left-wing's faith in the Israeli–Palestinian peace process. Israeli writer and journalist Amos Oz said

"Without any doubt, I blame the Palestinian leadership. They clearly did not want to sign an agreement at Camp David. Maybe Arafat prefers to be Che Guevara than Fidel Castro. If he becomes the president of Palestine, he'll be the leader of a rough, Third World country and have to deal with sewage in Hebron, drugs in Gaza, and the corruption in his own government."

In response, the Israeli military launched a series of strikes against Palestinian Authority targets in the West Bank and the Gaza Strip. Israeli forces sealed off several Palestinian cities and deployed troops, tanks, and armored vehicles. IDF helicopters fired rockets at two PA police stations in Ramallah (the police station where the lynching took place was destroyed); the Beit Lahia headquarters of Tanzim, the Al-Aqsa Martyrs' Brigades; and buildings near Arafat's headquarters in Gaza City. Israeli Navy gunboats were reportedly seen offshore. Six Palestinian Authority naval boats were destroyed. Later in the day, Israeli helicopters destroyed the Voice of Palestine radio station in Ramallah. According to Palestinian sources, a total of 27 people were injured in the attacks. Israeli authorities state that the PA was warned before the attacks, and that a warning shot was fired before every attack, in order to empty the buildings about to be attacked.

== Media coverage ==
An Italian film crew from Mediaset, Italy's largest private television station, captured footage of the lynching.

British photographer Mark Seager attempted to photograph the event but the mob physically assaulted him and destroyed his camera. After the event, he said,

"It was the most horrible thing that I have ever seen and I have reported from Congo, Kosovo, many bad places.... I know they [Palestinians] are not all like this and I'm a very forgiving person but I'll never forget this. It was murder of the most barbaric kind. When I think about it, I see that man's head, all smashed. I know that I'll have nightmares for the rest of my life."

An ABC News team also attempted to record the incident but the mob also prevented them from doing so. ABC News producer Nasser Atta said that when the crew began filming the lynching, "youths came to us and they stopped us with some knives, with some beating."

=== RAI scandal ===
Following the lynching on 16 October 2000, Riccardo Cristiano, the deputy head of the Jerusalem bureau of Italy's state television channel RAI, published a letter in Al-Hayat al-Jadida, the official daily newspaper of the Palestinian Authority (PA). In the letter (entitled "Special Clarification by the Italian Representative of RAI, the Official Italian Television Station"), Cristiano denies that RAI had any involvement with the filming of the incident and that one of the station's Italian competitors was responsible for the footage. He wrote,

"We [RAI] emphasize to all of you that the events did not happen this way, because we always respect (will continue to respect) the journalistic procedures with the Palestinian Authority for (journalistic) work in Palestine and we are credible in our precise work."

The Italian correspondent also praised the PA, declaring,

"We congratulate you [the PA] and think that it is our duty to put you in the picture (of the events) of what happened on October 12 in Ramallah.... We thank you for your trust, and you can be sure that this is not our way of acting. We do not (will not) do such a thing."

As a result of the letter, the Israeli Government Press Office suspended Cristiano's press card. The Israeli Foreign Ministry stated,

"His letter implies that he will never again film events which are liable to cast a negative light on the PA, such as the recent lynching of IDF reservists in Ramallah.... The State of Israel, as a democratic society, welcomes the foreign journalists working here and invests considerable effort in both assuring freedom of the press and assisting journalists in their work. All that we ask from foreign journalists is that they abide by the rules of press ethics as is accepted in democratic societies".

Cristiano's letter, which effectively identified Mediaset as being responsible for the footage, necessitated Mediaset to withdraw its staff out of fear of Palestinian revenge attacks. In response, Italian politician Silvio Berlusconi, whose family holding company controls Mediaset, said, "The letter is indicative of an anti-semitic attitude in elements of the Italian left." The Italian newspaper Corriere della Sera declared it a shameful day for Italian journalism.

For its part, RAI disowned the letter and recalled Cristiano, stating, "He will no longer work from Jerusalem. RAI had no knowledge of the letter and its content." Regarding Cristiano's motives for the letter, RAI asserted that the journalist had recently been injured while covering other Palestinian riots and he wished to dispel rumors that RAI was responsible for the footage.

=== Claims of Palestinian censorship ===
In relation to media coverage of the event, the Israeli Foreign Ministry accused Palestinian broadcasting stations of making "every effort to hide the horrible pictures which were shown around the world." The ministry further asserted that "according to reporters' evidence on the scene," the Palestinian police attempted to prevent foreign journalists from entering the area in order to obstruct reporting of the incident.

== Criminal proceedings ==
After he assumed office, Israeli Prime Minister Ariel Sharon ordered the Israeli security services to find and arrest the lynchers. Israel subsequently arrested suspects:

- Aziz Salha was arrested in 2001. He admitted to being one of those who broke into the police station and to choking one of the soldiers while others beat him bloody. When he saw that his hands were covered with the soldier's blood, he went to the window and proudly displayed his blood-stained hands to the mob below, and was photographed while doing so. In 2004, an Israeli court convicted him for the murder of Nurzhitz and sentenced him to life imprisonment. In October 2011 he was controversially released as part of the Gilad Shalit prisoner exchange. Salha was deported to the Gaza Strip. On 3 October 2024, during the Gaza war, he was killed in an Israeli airstrike in Gaza. The IDF claimed that Salha was active in Hamas and had been involved in advancing attacks in the West Bank from Gaza in recent years.
- Muhammad Howara, a Tanzim militant, was arrested in 2001. He admitted breaking into the police station and stabbing one of the soldiers.
- Ziad Hamdada, a Fatah Tanzim operative who set fire to the body of one of the Israeli reservists, was arrested in 2002. He had also participated in and planned other attacks on Israeli forces.
- Mohamed Abu Ida, a former member of the Palestinian police force in Ramallah, was arrested by Shin Bet in 2005. During the investigation, he admitted he had led the two Israeli soldiers to the Ramallah police station after which he joined the other rioters.
- Wisam Radi, a Palestinian policeman, was arrested by Israeli security forces and indicted before a military court in 2005 for killing Yosef Avrahami and abusing the body of Vadim Nurzhitz. In 2010, he was acquitted of Avrahami's murder on grounds that a critical piece of evidence was inadmissible in court. He was, however, convicted of mutilating Nurzhitz's body and sentenced to seven years in prison. An appellate court later overturned the decision not to convict him of murder following an appeal by the military prosecution.
- Haiman Zabam, a Tanzim operative, was arrested by Israeli paratroopers on 26 September 2007. He had been planning additional attacks on Israel.
- Marwan Ibrahim Tawfik Maadi and Yasser Ibrahim Mohammed Khatab, two Hamas members, were arrested by Shin Bet and Israeli Police during the breakup of a Hamas network in Ramallah and the Binyamin region. During the interrogation, they confessed to participating in the lynching, and in August 2012, they were indicted before a military court.

== See also ==
- Corporals killings, a similar incident in Northern Ireland
- Palestinian political violence
