= Jamala (disambiguation) =

Jamala (born 1983) is a Ukrainian singer and actress.

Jamala may also refer to:

== People ==
- Jamala al-Baidhani, Yemeni activist

== Places ==
- Jamala, Hama, a village in Hama Governorate, Syria
- Jammala, a village in Palestine

== See also ==
- Jamal (disambiguation)
