= CSPS =

CSPS may refer to:

- Calendar of State Papers Relating to Scotland. 1589–93. 13 vols. London: 1898–1969.
- Canadian Ski Patrol, an organization providing ski patrol services across Canada (now CSP)
- Christian Science Publishing Society, the publishing arm of The First Church of Christ, Scientist in Boston, Massachusetts
- Czech-Slovak Protective Society, an organization dedicated to the cultural preservation of Czech and Slovak immigrants in the United States
- The Canada School of Public Service, a government organization whose mandate is to provide a range of learning activities
- Canadian Society for Pharmaceutical Sciences
