= Wilfred Limonious =

Wilfred Limonious (1949 – 1999) was a Jamaican dancehall artist. His career started to take off in the 1970s, with his art being published in various Jamaican newspapers. Also in the 1970s he started to work for JAMAL. His first album artwork was for Jah Thomas's Shoulder Move. He has reportedly drawn over 300 album covers. His artwork established the style for these kinds of albums.

In 2016, a book collecting his art, In Fine Style: The Dancehall Art of Wilfred Limonious, was released. The book also features his artwork from various publications Various publications have released articles covering him, including The Guardian. This led to various exhibitions and art shows showcasing his works.
