= Jahmai (given name) =

Jahmai is a masculine given name. Notable people with the name include:

- Jahmai Jones (born 1997), American baseball outfielder and second baseman
- Jahmai Mashack (born 2002), American basketball shooting guard
- Jahmai Simpson-Pusey (born 2005), English football centre-back

== See also ==
- Jamal (given name)
