= Djamel Eddine Kouloughli =

Algerian Linguist

- Born: December 6, 1947; Constantine, Algeria
- Died: 22 January 2013 (aged 65); France

Academic background
- Thesis: Contribution à la phonologie générative de l’arabe : le système verbal du parler arabe du Sra (Nord-Constantinois) (1978)
- Doctoral advisor: Antoine Culioli

Academic work
- Discipline: Linguistics
- Institutions: CNRS

Djamel Eddine Kouloughli (Arabic: جمال الدين كولوغلي) was an Algerian and French linguist (6 December 1947 – 22 January 2013) who specialized in the phonology and grammatical tradition of Arabic.

== Life ==
Djamel Eddine Kouloughli was born in Constantine, Algeria on 6 December 1947. After an initial training in the study of English at the University of Algiers and at University of Paris 8, he turned to Arabic linguistics. He was recruited by the CNRS in 1982, and moved increasingly towards linguistic theory, joining the Laboratoire de linguistique formelle and doing a thesis on the phonology of Algerian Arabic under its director, Antoine Culioli in 1978. After working in Cairo for two years, he returned to France in 1996 to found the Centre d’étude des langues et littératures du monde arabe, a UMR attached to the ENS de Fontenay-St Cloud. This research unit was closed in 2001. He then joined the Laboratoire d’histoire des théories linguistiques, where he researched the development of Arabic grammatical theories. He collaborated extensively with Georges Bohas.

== Reception ==
After his death, a special issue of Histoire Épistémologie Langage was dedicated to his work.
