= Jamal ad-Din =

Jamal ad-Din, Jamal ud-Din or Jamal al-Din (Arabic: جمال الدين), meaning 'Beauty of the Faith', is a male Muslim name formed from the elements Jamal and ad-Din. In Egyptian pronunciation it appears as Gamal el-Din or in similar forms. In Bosnian usage it is usually written Džemaludin. It may also refer to:

== Government and politics ==
- Jamal ad-Din I (1325), Sultan of the Ifat Sultanate
- Jamal al-Din al-Ustadar (died 1411), emir in Egypt
- Jamal ad-Din II (died 1433), 3rd Sultan of the Adal Empire
- Jamal al-Din al-Afghani (1838–1897), Islamic political activist
- Mehmet Cemaleddin Efendi (1848–1917), senior judge of the Ottoman Empire
- Djamaluddin Malik (1917–1970), Indonesian film producer and politician
- Jamaluddin Jarjis (1951–2015), Malaysian politician
- Ahmed Gamal El-Din Moussa (born 1951), Egyptian politician and lawyer
- Gamal El Deen Muhammad Hosni Sayed Mubarak, or just Gamal Mubarak (born 1963), Egyptian politician
- Iyad Jamal Al-Din (born 1961), Iraqi politician
- Abdel Ahad Gamal El Din, Egyptian politician
- Khairy Jamaluddin (born 1976), Malaysian politician
- Jamaludin Malik (born 1989), Indonesian politician

== Sports ==
- Džemaludin Mušović (born 1944), Bosnian football manager
- Džemaludin or Džemal Hadžiabdić (born 1963), Bosnian footballer
- Djamolidine Abdoujaparov (born 1964), Uzbek racing cyclist
- Dzhamaldin Khodzhaniyazov (born 1996), Russian footballer
- Jameleddine Limam (born 1967), Tunisian footballer
- Jamaluddin (cricketer) (born 1985), Pakistani cricketer
- Jamaluddin Ahmed (born 1977), Bangladeshi cricketer
- Rifat Zhemaletdinov (born 1996), Russian footballer
- Timur Zhamaletdinov (born 1997), Russian footballer

== Writers ==
- Jamal-ud-Din Hansvi (c. 1187–c. 1261), Afghan scholar, poet, Sufi
- Jamal al-Din Yusuf bin al-Amir Sayf al-Din Taghribirdi, or just Ibn Taghribirdi (1410–1470), Egyptian historian
- Djamaluddin Adinegoro (1904–1967), Indonesian journalist
- Jamal-ud-din Abro, or just Jamal Abro (1924–2004), Sindhi writer
- Yousef Gamal El-Din (born 1985), Swiss-Egyptian journalist and television personality

== Other ==
- Jamal ad-Din Bukhari (fl. 1260s), Persian astronomer
- Jamal-ud-Din Yaqut (fl. early died 1240), Abyssinian slave who rose to a position of influence in the Delhi Sultanate
- Jamal al-Din al-Isnawi (1304–1370), a Shafi'i jurist and Qur'anic exegete
- Jamal ad-Din Al Zayla’i (died 1360), Somali Hanafi jurist and Muhaddith
- Jamal ad-Din Hasan ibn Yusuf ibn 'Ali ibn Muthahhar al-Hilli (1250–1325), Iraqi Twelver Shi'a theologian
- Jamal al-Din ibn Muhammad Muqim (17th century), Mughal scientific instrument maker: one of the Lahore family of astrolabists
- Jamaluddin Hossain (1943–2024), Bangladeshi actor
- Džemaludin Čaušević (1870–1938), Bosniak reformer and imam
- Jamaaladeen Tacuma (born 1956), (adopted name), American jazz bassist
- Jamal Udeen Al-Harith (1966–2017), British Muslim imprisoned in Guantanamo
- M. Jamal Deen (born 1955), Guyanese IT professor working in Canada
