= Manjit Singh (runner) =

Indian middle-distance runner (born 1989)

Personal information
- Full name: Manjit Singh Chahal
- Born: 1 September 1989 (age 36) Ujhana, Haryana, India
- Height: 1.76 m (5 ft 9 in)

Sport
- Sport: Athletics
- Event(s): 800 m, 1500 m

Achievements and titles
- Personal best(s): 800 m: 1:46.15 (Jakarta 2018); 1500 m: 3:42.24 (Patiala 2018)
Medal record
Men's athletics
Representing India
Asian Games
Gold medal – first place	2018 Jakarta	800m

Manjit Singh Chahal (born 1 September 1989) is an Indian middle-distance runner who specialises in the 800 m and 1500 m events. He represented India at the 2018 Asian Games where he won the gold in the men's 800 m event.

== Personal life ==
Manjit was born in Ujhana village, Jind district, Haryana, to Randhir Chahal and Bimala Devi. He grew his passion for athletics from his father only, Randhir who himself was a field athlete, in discus throw and shot put. Manjit is married, have a son, names Abhir with wife Kiran. In his spare time he used to help his father in dairy, cattle and agriculture farming. He had a contract job with ONGC from 2013 to 2016.

== Career ==
=== 2013−2017 ===
In 2013 Manjit took part in his first international event, in the 2013 Asian Athletics Championships, at Pune, where he finished 4th place in the Men's 800 metres final clocking 1:49.70 mins. In 2014, he bagged a silver in the 800 metres in Federation Cup, but failed to qualify for the Commonwealth Games and Asian Games. After a long injury for one and half year, he took part in the National Inter-state Championship at Hyderabad winning silver then at Guntur and bettered his 800 m time, clocking 1:48.04 mins and winning silver on July 16, 2017. In the same event, on 18 July, he competed in the 1500m and finished with a timing 3:49.30 which was his personal best at that time.

=== 2018 ===
On March 7, 2018, in the Patiala Federation Cup, he competed in both 800 m and 1500 m and bettered his timings of 1500 m to 3:42.24 and qualified for 1500 m in the 2018 Asian Games. On 27 August 2018, Manjit Singh, stunned everyone and compatriot Jinson Johnson to win gold in the Men's 800 metres at the Asian Games after 36 years for India where he clocked 1:46.15 as his personal best.
