= Džemaludin =

Džemaludin is a Bosnian masculine surname which may refer to:

- Džemaludin Čaušević (1870-1938), Bosnian theologian, thinker, educator, reformer, journalist, translator and linguist
- Džemaludin Džemal Hadžiabdić (born 1953), Bosnian football manager and former footballer
- Džemaludin Mušović (born 1944), Bosnian retired football manager and player

== See also ==
- Dželaludin Muharemović (born 1970), Bosnian football manager
- Jamal ad-Din (disambiguation), a Muslim given name
