= Djamel =

Djamel or Djamil is a masculine given name of Arabic origin. Notable people with the name include:

== Given name ==
=== Djamel ===
- Djamel Ould Abbes (1934–2026), Algerian doctor and politician
- Djamel Abdoun (born 1986), French-Algerian footballer
- Djamel Agaoua (born 1969), French businessman and entrepreneur
- Djamel Ainaoui (born 1975), French wrestler
- Djamel Amani (born 1962), Algerian footballer
- Djamel Ameziane (born 1967), Algerian-Canadian Guantanamo detainee
- Djamel Amrani (1935–2005), Algerian writer
- Djamel Bakar (born 1989), French-Comorian footballer
- Djamel Beghal (born 1965), French-Algerian man convicted of terrorism
- Djamel Belalem (born 1993), Algerian footballer
- Djamel Belkacem (born 1958), Tunisian football manager
- Djamel Belmadi (born 1976), Algerian football player and coach
- Djamel Benchadli (born 1963), Algerian football manager
- Djamel Benlamri (born 1989), Algerian footballer
- Djamel Bouaïcha (born 1982), Algerian footballer
- Djamel Bounab, Algerian actor and comedian
- Djamel Bouras (born 1971), French-Algerian judoka
- Djamel Chanderli (1920–1990), Algerian filmmaker, documentary director, and independence activist
- Djamel Chettal (born 1992), Algerian footballer
- Djamel Haimoudi (born 1970), Algerian football referee
- Djamel-Eddine Houhou (1934–2022), Algerian diplomat and politician
- Djamel Ibouzidène (born 1994), Algerian footballer
- Djamel Keddou (1952–2011), Algerian football player and manager
- Djamel Eddine Kouloughli (1947–2013), Algerian-French linguist
- Djamel Laroussi, Algerian singer, composer, songwriter, arranger, and guitar player
- Djamel Leeflang (born 1992), Dutch footballer
- Djamel Lifa (born 1969), French boxer
- Djamel Mastouri, French Paralympian athlete
- Djamel Menad (1960–2025), Algerian footballer
- Djamel Mesbah (born 1984), Algerian footballer
- Djamel Okacha (1978–2019), Algerian jihadist
- Djamel El Okbi (1939–1994), Algerian footballer
- Djamel Sedjati (born 1999), Algerian middle-distance runner
- Djamel Tatah (born 1959), French-Algerian artist
- Djamel Tlemçani (born 1955), Algerian footballer
- Djamel White (born 1997), Irish writer
- Djamel Yahiouche (born 1959), Algerian swimmer
- Djamel Zidane (born 1955), Algerian footballer
- Djamel Zitouni (1964–1996), Algerian militant

=== Djamil ===
- Djamil Suherman (1924–1985), Indonesian journalist and poet

== See also ==
- Ramdane Djamel District, district in Skikda Province, Algeria
