= Džemal =

Male given name

- Gender: Male

Other gender
- Feminine: Džemila, Djemila

Origin
- Meaning: Beautiful

Other names
- Variant forms: Džemil, Džemail

Džemal is a male given name.

In the Balkans, Džemal is popular among Bosniaks in the former Yugoslav nations. The name is derived from the Arabic name Jamal (جمال), which means beautiful. There are several variants of the name, including Džemail, Džemil, Džemaludin, Dželaludin, and Djemal, all of which carry the same meaning. The region also has a female equivalent of the name: Džemila/Djemila (for example, Djemila Benhabib).

== Given names ==
=== Džemal ===
- Džemal Berberović (born 1981), Bosnian retired footballer
- Džemal Bijedić (1917–1977), Bosnian politician who served as Prime Minister of Yugoslavia
- Džemal Hadžiabdić (born 1953), Bosnian retired footballer
- Džemal Mustedanagić (born 1955), Bosnian footballer and manager
- Džemal Perović (born 1956), Montenegrin politician and civic activist

=== Džemail ===
- Džemail Koničanin (1910–1944), Albanian military commander
- Džemail Suljević (born 1948), Serbian politician

=== Džemil ===
- Džemil Cerić (born 1949), Bosnian retired footballer

== See also ==
- Djemal Pasha (1872–1922), Ottoman military leader
- Dželaludin Muharemović (born 1970), Bosnian football manager
