= Jamali (surname) =

Surname and a tribe in Pakistan and the Middle East

Jamali is a surname and tribe mainly located in Balochistan and Sindh, Pakistan. They are also found in the Middle Eastern countries.

Notable people with the surname include:

- Badr al-Jamali, Statesman, missionary and military chief of the Fatimid Caliphate, Cairo
- Fakhreddin Jamali (born 1945), Iranian-Canadian professor of pharmacy and pharmaceutical sciences at the University of Alberta
- Jan Mohammad Jamali, politician from Jaffarabad, Balochistan, Pakistan
- Manuchehr Jamali, Iranian philosopher
- Muhammad Fadhel al-Jamali, former Prime Minister of Iraq
- Rosa Jamali, Iranian poet and playwright
- Taj Muhammad Jamali, former Chief Minister of Balochistan, Pakistan
- Zafarullah Khan Jamali, former Prime Minister of Pakistan
- Rafiq Ahmed Jamali, chairman Gorakh Hills Station Development Authority (GHSDA), Sindh, Pakistan

== See also ==
- Jamali (given name)
