= Jamal Muhammad =

Jamal Muhammad may refer to:

- Jamal Muhammad Abidat, Jordanian politician
- Jamal Muhammad Alawi Mar'i, Yemeni former detainee at Guantanamo Bay
- Jamal Muhammad Al-Deen, Pakistani former detainee at Guantanamo Bay

== See also ==
- Jamal Mohamed (disambiguation)
