= Malik (surname) =

- Language: Arabic

Origin
- Meaning: King, Allah
- Region of origin: Arabian Peninsula

Other names
- Variant forms: Mullick, Mallik, Melik, Malka, Malek, Maleek, Malick, Mallick, Melekh

Malik (Arabic: ملك) is a surname deriving from the Arabic word malik, meaning "king" or "chieftain". The title "Malik" was granted to many Jats in India, and began to be used a surname in the 14th century. Malik is also found in Ror people and Lohar caste of Haryana. Despite its usage among Hindus in India, the surname is predominantly used by Muslims worldwide, due to its Islamic origin. It is also one of the 99 names of Allah and is used in the Quran.

Notable people with the name include:

- Abdul Malik, brigadier (rtd.), first Pakistani cardiologist
- Anas ibn Malik, a companion of Muhammad
- Anu Malik, Indian singer and music director
- Anmol Malik, Indian author and singer
- Armaan Malik, Indian singer
- Art Malik, Pakistani-born British actor
- Camelia Malik (born 1955), Indonesian actress and singer
- D. S. Malik (1958–2025), Indian-American mathematician and professor
- Djamaluddin Malik (1917–1970), Indonesian film producer, politician, entrepreneur
- Jamaludin Malik (born 1989), Indonesian politician
- Jitendra Malik (born 1960), Indian-American computer scientist
- Majeed Malik (1919–2016), Pakistani military officer and politician
- Muskan Malik (cricketer) (born 2002), Indian cricket player
- Muskan Malik (kabaddi) (born 2000), Indian kabaddi player
- Nikunj Malik, Indian actress
- Rami Malek, American actor
- Rehman Malik, Pakistani politician and investigator
- Sakshi Malik, Indian professional wrestler
- Shammas Malik, American lawyer and politician
- Shoaib Malik, Pakistani cricket player
- Steve Malik (born 1965), American businessman and sports team owner
- Sulayman ibn Abd al-Malik (born 675 CE), Seventh caliph of the Umayyad Caliphate
- Tashfeen Malik (1987–2015), Arab-American terrorist
- Veena Malik, Pakistani actress, TV host and model
- Yasin Malik, Kashmiri political leader and chairman of Jammu Kashmir Liberation front
- Zayn Malik (born 1993), British singer
