= Jamal Sadat =

Ethiopian footballer

Personal information
- Full name: Jamal Sadat
- Date of birth: 2 July 1983 (age 43)
- Place of birth: Addis Abeba, Ethiopia
- Position: Goalkeeper

Team information
- Current team: Ethiopian Coffee
- Number: 1

Senior career*
Years	Team	Apps	(Gls)
2000–2001	Nyala SC	?	(?)
2003–present	Ethiopian Coffee	?	(?)

International career
2000–	Ethiopia		
- * Club domestic league appearances and goals as of 1 February 2007

Jamal Sadat (Amharic: ጃማል ጻዳት, born 2 July 1983 in Addis Abeba) is an Ethiopian football goalkeeper. He currently plays for Ethiopian Coffee.

Sadat is a member of the Ethiopia national football team. He came in winter 2003 from Nyala SC.
