= Mayor of Beirut =

Executive position in Beirut, Lebanon

The Mayor of Beirut is head of the executive branch of the political system in the municipality of Beirut, Lebanon.

The current Mayor of Beirut is Abdallah Darwish. He was elected on 9 August 2023 by Beirut Municipal Council, replacing Jamal Itani who had retired for health reasons.
