= Helen Burt =

British-Canadian pharmaceutical scientist

Helen Mary Burt
- Born: Manchester
- Education: University of British Columbia; University of Bath
- Scientific career
- Workplaces: University of British Columbia
- Thesis: Effect of crystal anisotropy and crystal defects on dissolution (1980)

Helen M. Burt OC is a British-Canadian pharmaceutical scientist who is the Angiotech Professor of Drug Delivery at the University of British Columbia. She serves as Associate Vice President of Research and Innovation at UBC. Her research considers novel therapeutics based on nanotechnology, including drug delivery systems for the treatment of bladder cancer and coronary artery disease.

== Early life and education ==
Burt is from Manchester in the United Kingdom. During a high school trip to a local hospital, she was first introduced to pharmacy. Burt was an undergraduate student at the University of Bath, where she specialised in pharmacy. She moved to Canada to complete her graduate research as a doctoral student at the University of British Columbia, where she studied anisotropy and defects on dissolution of crystals.

== Research and career ==
Burt joined the faculty at the University of British Columbia in 1980. Her research involves the use of nanotechnology for drug delivery. She has demonstrated that systems can provide targeted relief to different parts of the body, and release specific amounts of drug and controlled rates. In particular, Burt has studied nanocrystalline cellulose, a molecular substrate that has large surfaces areas and negative surface charges. Nanocrystalline cellulose can withstand binding of high quantities of drugs, and contain hydroxyl groups that can be used for surface modification. The hydroxyl groups can be used to selective load and release treatments, including ant-infective agents in wound dressings.

Burt worked alongside Sitka Biopharma on STK-01, a polymer nanoparticle based drug-delivery system that can be used to treat bladder cancer. The drug, which delivers targeted chemotherapy (Docetaxel) to non-muscle invasive bladder cancer, entered clinical trials in 2017.

Burt co-founded the Centre for Drug Research and Development in 2004. The centre later became adMare BioInnovations, which allows biomedical scientists to translate their research into industry. In 2011, Burt was made Associate Vice President of Research and Innovation.

== Awards and honours ==
- 2006 Natural Sciences and Engineering Research Council Synergy Award for Innovation
- 2009 Canadian Society for Pharmaceutical Sciences Award of Leadership in Canadian Pharmaceutical Sciences
- 2009 University of British Columbia Killam Faculty Research Award for Science
- 2020 Order of Canada

== Selected publications ==
- Kevin Letchford; Burt, Helen (2006). "A review of the formation and classification of amphiphilic block copolymer nanoparticulate structures: micelles, nanospheres, nanocapsules and polymersomes". European Journal of Pharmaceutics and Biopharmaceutics. 65 (3): 259–269. doi:10.1016/j.ejpb.2006.11.009. PMID 17196803. Wikidata Q36695819.
- John K. Jackson; Kevin Letchford; Benjamin Z. Wasserman; Lucy Ye; Wadood Y. Hamad; Burt, Helen (2011). "The use of nanocrystalline cellulose for the binding and controlled release of drugs". International Journal of Nanomedicine. 6: 321–330. doi:10.2147/ijn.s16749. PMC 3044185. PMID 21383857. Wikidata Q39579655.
- R. T. Liggins; W. L. Hunter; H. M. Burt (1997). "Solid-state characterization of paclitaxel". Journal of Pharmaceutical Sciences. 86 (12): 1458–1463. doi:10.1021/js9605226. PMID 9423162. Wikidata Q74017423.
