= Jamahl =

Jamahl is a given name. Notable people with the name include:

- Jamahl Knowles (born 1988), Canadian football player
- Jamahl Lolesi (born 1981), New Zealand rugby league footballer
- Jamahl Mosley (born 1978), American basketball coach and former player
- Jamahl Strachan (born 1988), Bahamian politician

== See also ==
- Jamal
