= Jamal Kakakhel =

Pakistani politician and social worker

Jamal Kakakhel was a Pakistani regional politician, social worker and the chief of his tribe "Kakakhel" at village Dandoka.

== Political life ==
In 1951, the Governor of NWFP, Khurshid Ali Khan visited to him at his village and was impressed by his work as "Judicial Assessor". He said:

It has been an honour for me that I have been invited here by a brave, noble, straight forward and devoted worker of Pakistan's Movement. I have found Mian Hazrat Jamal Kakakhel as the most sincere and devoted Assessors among all the Assessors acting through whole of NWFP. The taste of hospitality which I received here enlighteness the grace of the personality of Main Sahib. Such peoples born very rarely even in centuries. I love such peoples and I have always prayed that such personalities may produce in this society. Because societies are fuelled not by impersonals but by personalities, and Mian Hazrat Jamal Kakakhel has been absolutely among those model personalities.
