= Al-Manara Square =

Square in Ramallah, West Bank, Palestine

Coordinates: 31°54′18″N 35°12′16″E

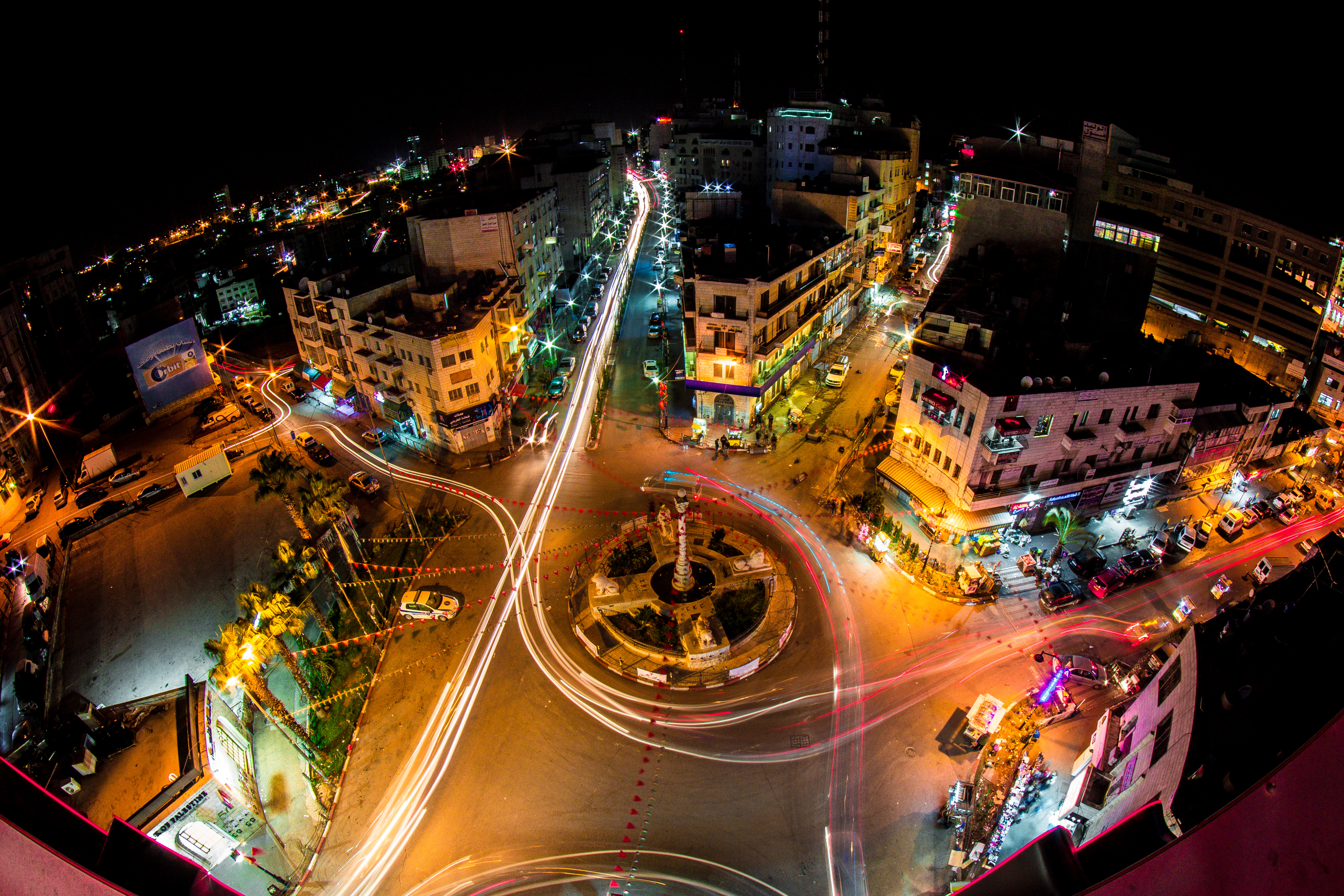
Aerial view of Al-Manara Square in 2016

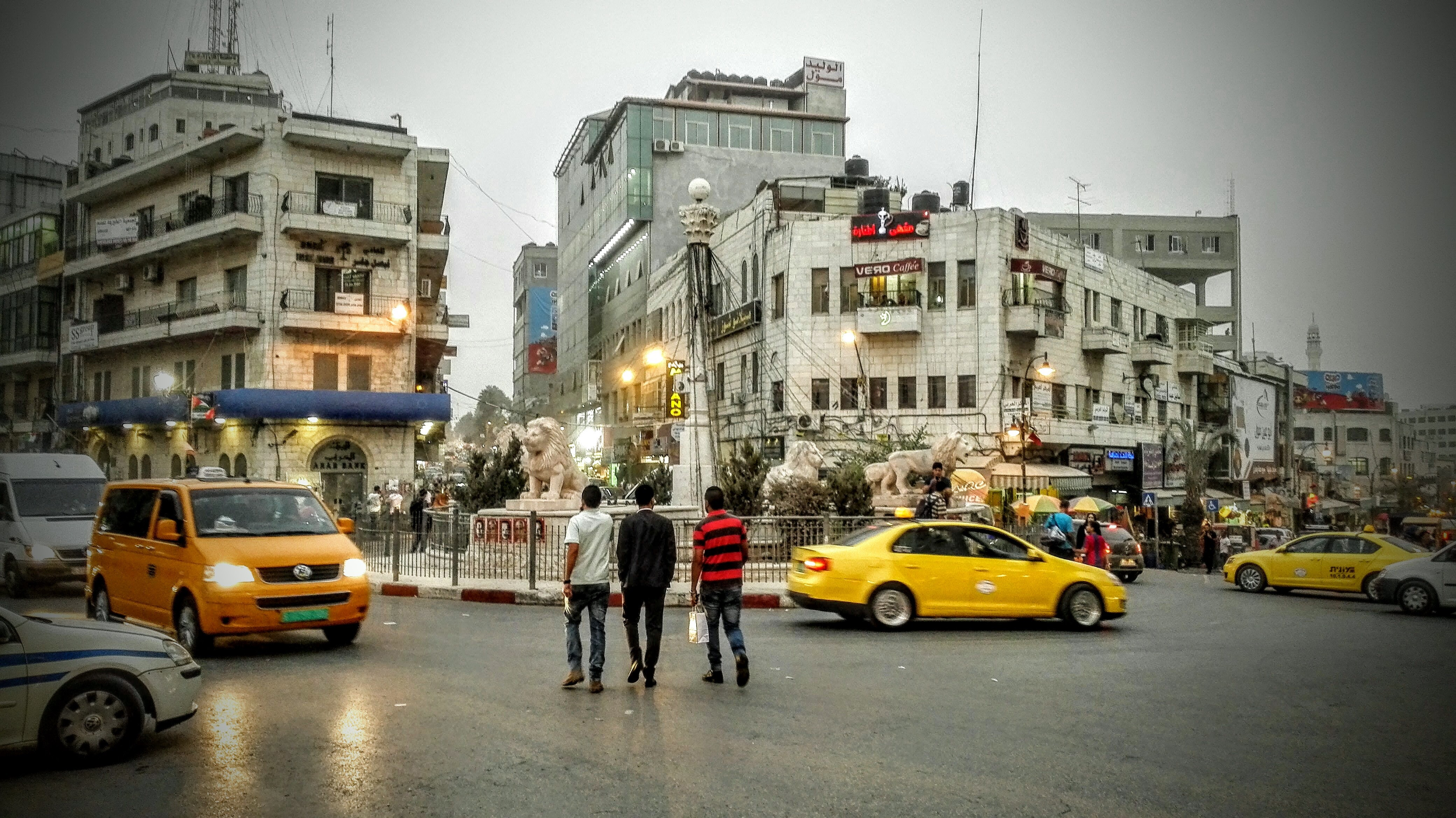
Al-Manara Square in 2015

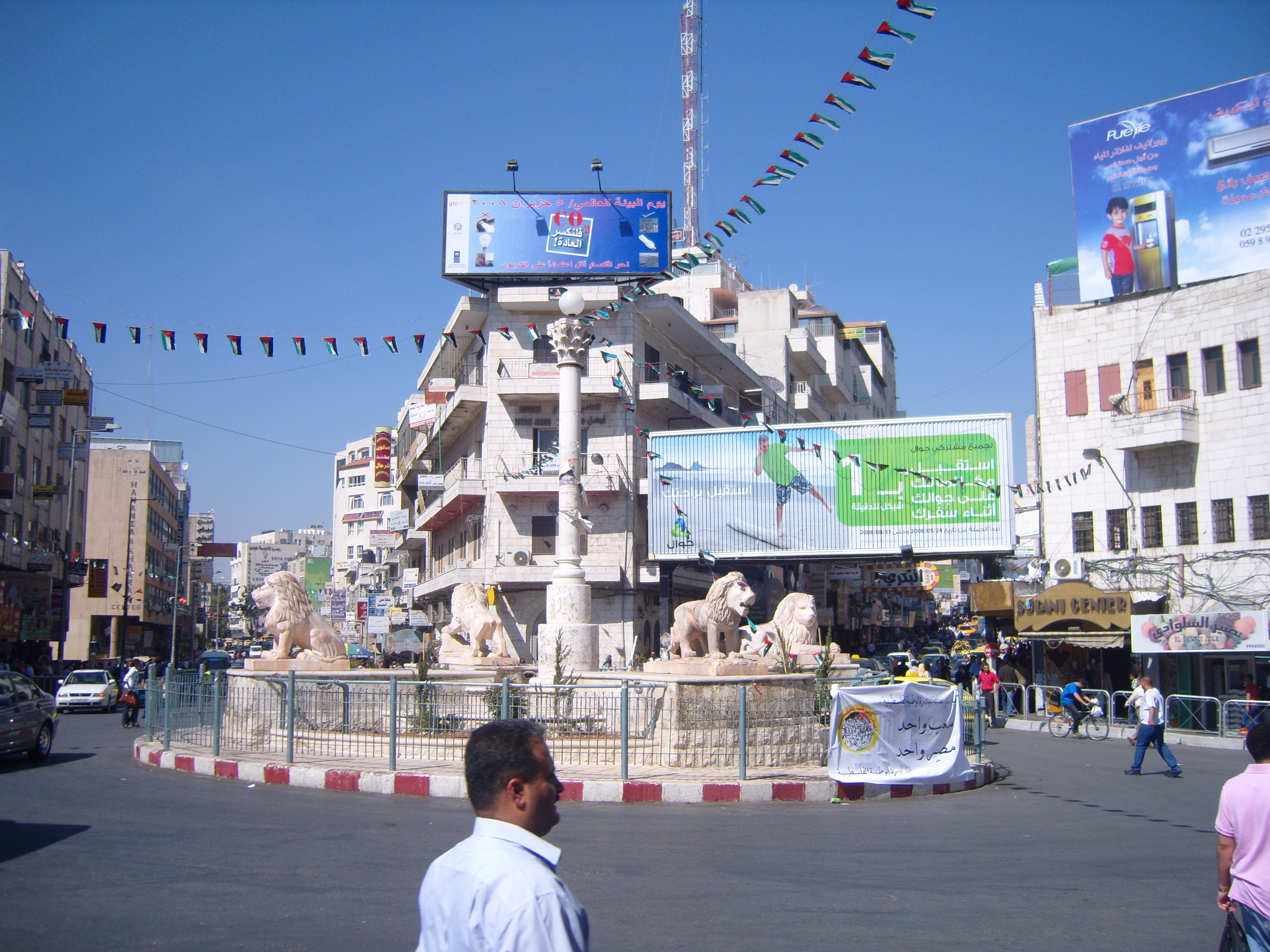
Al-Manara Square

Al-Manara Square (Arabic: ميدان المنارة) is a town square located in Ramallah, West Bank, Palestine. It has been called "one of Palestine’s renowned public spaces."

== History ==
=== Early history ===
Until the end of the 19th century, the site of al-Manara Square was part of a dirt road that connected Ramallah to the nearby town of al-Bireh. With the establishment of the Friend's Boys School near the site in 1901 and later the Ottoman decree making Ramallah a local administrative center in 1902, the road became increasingly important for the area. By 1905 a new road connecting Nablus with Jerusalem passed through the site of al-Manara Square and the Saraya building, housing the local Ottoman administration, was built 250 meters away.

In 1918, after the fall of Ottoman Empire, the United Kingdom established the British Mandate of Palestine and designated Ramallah as capital of its own administrative district. In 1935 Ramallah and neighboring al-Bire2h were connected to an electricity grid. And electrical switchboard controlling the street lights was placed on a pole planted on a dirt road separating them which was dubbed "al-Manara" or "The Lighthouse." During the 1936–1939 Arab revolt in Palestine the British authorities built the Muqata'ah and a prison 800 meters from al-Manara, where both still stand.

The roads leading to al-Manara were widened to accommodate the Muqata'a. The infrastructure around the square continued to improve until the 1948 Arab–Israeli War which resulted in a mass Palestinian exodus from areas captured by the nascent state of Israel. The Ramallah area saw a large influx of refugees which resulted in an increase of political and social activities in the city.

In 1951, during Jordanian control of the West Bank, the electrical pole was replaced with by a monument proposed by Ramallah's commissioner (Jalil M. Badran) and designed by a Ramallah artist. The monument consisted of five lions on a stone pillar surrounded by fountains and flower beds. The stone lions used on the monument have been described as "traditional symbols of bravery, power and pride." The five lions represented Ramallah's original inhabitants, five families known as Ibrahim, Jerias, Shqair, Hassan, and Haddad. All five of these families were descended from the Rashid al-Haddadin family, which migrated to Ramallah in the 16th century from the areas of Al-Karak and Shoubak in Jordan.

=== Israeli occupation ===
Israel captured Ramallah during the Six-Day War in 1967, dismissed the municipality and installed a military governor to oversee the district's affairs. In 1982 Israeli commander Moshe Biton issued a decree to demolish Al-Manara Square and the monument was stored in a municipal treasury. Palestinians protested the Israeli occupation and did civil disobedience during the First Intifada. On 10 October 1987, Israeli troops shot and killed one woman and injured four peaceful protesters in the square. Demonstrations, including a shopkeepers strike, in the square continued from 1987 until 1993 when, due to the Oslo Accords, the Israeli military left the city.

=== Palestinian control ===
When Palestinian municipal councils retook control they rebuilt the monument at the site of the previous Al-Manara monument, inside a traffic circle. As the population of Ramallah grew, resulting in traffic problems, Al-Manara was reconstructed several times. In 1999, the municipality appointed an English architect to rebuild the monument in the mode of the original design. Three more families were represented in the statues, al-Ajlouni, Hishmah, and al-Araj. The monument would be topped by a lamp directed skyward whose light might reach as far as ten kilometres. The monument was finished in July 2000. During the Second Intifada (2000–2007) a suspected collaborator was shot in the head in the square.

The square continues to be used to protest the actions of Israel and of Palestinian leaders. In 2007 Palestinian police broke up protests against the Annapolis Middle East peace conference. In 2009 and 2010 Ramallah-area protests against the Gaza War in were limited to al-Manara Square. After Al Jazeera released the Palestine Papers in early 2011 angry protesters who doubted the veracity of documents showing Palestinian officials made generous concessions to Israel protested in the square and at Al Jazeera offices on the square, breaking some windows of the news organization. In early 2011 protesters calling for an end to the split between Fatah and Hamas set up a tent in al-Manara Square. In 2011 Palestinians protested erected a tent in the square where more than ten Palestinians were participating in a hunger strike in solidarity with 6,000 Arab and Palestinian prisoners who had been on a hunger strike in Israeli jails.

In 2000, a group of Palestinians lynched two IDF troops who had accidentally crossed the border. They later dragged their bodies there.
