= Jamal Uddin Ahmed =

Jamal Uddin Ahmed may refer to:

- Jamal Uddin Ahmad (1932–2015), Bangladeshi politician
- Jamal Uddin Ahmed (air officer) (born 1943)
- Jamal Uddin Ahmed (politician) (1954–2021), Indian politician
- Jamal Uddin Ahmed (artist) (born 1955), Bangladeshi artist
