= Jamal Cudahy =

Fictional character on the ABC soap opera All My Children

- All My Children character
- Portrayed by: Jimmy Wiggins (1993); Amir Williams (1993–95); Marcus Patrick (2006)
- First appearance: 1993
- Last appearance: 2006
In-universe information
- Occupation: Law student Former bartender at Confusion
- Parents: Alec McIntyre; Janine Wilson
- Adoptive parents: Tom Cudahy; Livia Frye
- Siblings: Terrence Frye (adoptive); Laura Cudahy (adoptive)
- Uncles: Sean Cudahy (adoptive); Derek Frye (adoptive)
- First cousins: Danielle Frye (adoptive)

Jamal Cudahy is a fictional character on the ABC soap opera, All My Children. He was portrayed by two child actors from 1993 to 1995, and lastly by Marcus Patrick in 2006.

Jamal was an orphaned street kid who lost his mother to AIDS. Livia and Tom Cudahy took Jamal in as their foster son after they discovered him living in their cellar. After the adoption became finalized, It came to light that Alec McIntyre, corporate mogul/white collar criminal was his biological father. Alec sued for custody which left a hurt and confused Jamal looking to score heroin from a shifty drug dealer.

Alec dropped his custody suit once he saw that remaining with Tom and Livia was best for Jamal. Soon after Alec was arrested for attempted murder of his mother-in-law Arlene Vaughan. Jamal went to see Alec in lockup and told him he wanted nothing to do with him!

The Cudahys moved away after Livia received a spot on the judicial bench in a neighboring town. Jamal returned about a decade later as a law student who volunteered with a domestic violence advocacy group. Jamal accompanied Annie Lavery to Pine Valley when she left her husband, sex offender Terry McDermott.

Jamal briefly got a job bartending at Confusion. Shortly after that he left the series without on-screen explanation.
