= Nyala S.C. =

Association football club in Ethiopia

Nyala
- Full name: Nyala Sports Club
- Founded: 1968
- Ground: Nyala Stadium; Addis Ababa, Ethiopia
- Capacity: 3,000
- Chairman: Ato Wondu Bekele
- League: Ethiopian Premier League
Home colours	Away colours

Nyala Sports Club is an Ethiopian football club based in Addis Ababa. They are members of the Ethiopian Football Federation national league. Their home stadium is Nyala Stadium.

== History ==
In 1968, the general manager of national Tobacco Corporation decided that the company should take the ownership of a local team which was formed by Ato Mekonen Tessema in a place called Gofa. The name of the club was changed to Marathon and it was registered by the now defunct Shewan Football Federation. When the general manager left the company, the club folded.

When AEWA started football competition between workers, Nyala workers started participation. It won the trophy beating EELPA's workers in the final. The team collected money from the company, and fees paid by worker members. Then the company decided to take over the club and use it as for marketing.

In 1991, the club was restructured and renamed Nyala Sports club. It was under Region 14 Culture and Sports Bureau for four years as a second division team, and in 1997 it won the division and was promoted to the national division.

== Achievements ==
- Addis Abeba First Division

1997

- Ethiopian Higher Division

1998

- Addis Abeba Cup

1999

- Addis Abeba Higher Division

2000

- Ethiopian National League

2001
