= Journal of Pharmacy & Pharmaceutical Sciences =

- Discipline: Pharmacy
- Language: English
- Edited by: Reza Mehvar

Publication details
- History: 1998–present
- Publisher: Frontiers Media on behalf of the Canadian Society for Pharmaceutical Sciences (Canada)
- Frequency: Continuous
- Open access: Yes
- License: CC BY 4.0
- Impact factor: 5.5 (2025)

Standard abbreviations
- ISO 4: J. Pharm. Pharm. Sci.

Indexing
- CODEN: JPPSFY
- ISSN: 1482-1826
- OCLC no.: 43305157

Links
- Journal homepage; Online archive

The Journal of Pharmacy & Pharmaceutical Sciences is an open access peer-reviewed medical journal covering all aspects of pharmacy and pharmaceutical sciences. It was established in 1998, and is published by Frontiers Media on behalf of the Canadian Society for Pharmaceutical Sciences. The editor-in-chief from its establishment was Fakhreddin Jamali (University of Alberta) (1998-2025) and is now Reza Mehvar (Chapman University), Orange California. According to the Journal Citation Reports, JPPS is a Q1 journal and has a 2025 impact factor of 5.5.
