= Antoine Culioli =

French linguist (1924–2018)

Antoine Culioli (4 September 1924 – 9 February 2018) was a French linguist of Corsican origin. He developed a linguistic theory known as Théorie des Opérations Énonciatives (sometimes abbreviated as TOE).

He was influenced by Émile Benveniste, Gustave Guillaume, and the Stoics.

== Sources ==
- (in French) A biographical note on Antoine Culioli.
