= Fakhreddin Jamali =

Iranian-Canadian pharmacist

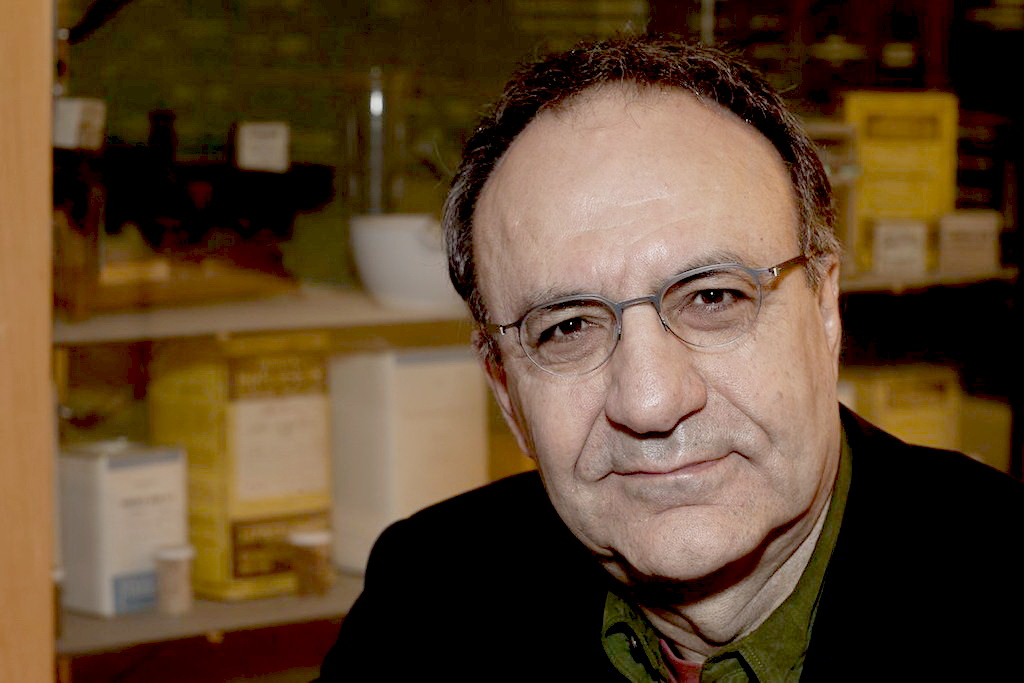
- Born: Arak, Iran
- Education: University of British Columbia (PhD); University of Tehran (Pharm.D.)
- Known for: founding the Canadian Society for Pharmaceutical Sciences
- Spouse: Elaheh Keshavarz-Jamali (b. 1945- d. 2020)
- Children: 1
- Awards: Alberta Centennial Medal, AAPS fellowship, CSPS fellowship, Killam Professorship
- Scientific career
- Fields: pharmaceutical sciences
- Institutions: University of Alberta

Fakhreddin Jamali is an Iranian-Canadian pharmacist. He is a professor emeritus of pharmacy and pharmaceutical sciences at the University of Alberta. He is the founding president and founding editor of the Canadian Society for Pharmaceutical Sciences, and the Journal of Pharmacy and Pharmaceutical Sciences respectively.

== Early life ==
Fakhreddin was born in Arak, Iran to Jamaleddin Jamali and Batoul Rouhani-Jamali.

== Career ==
Jamali's focus has been on drugs action (pharmacodynamics) and disposition (pharmacokinetics) particularly in field of analgesics and antiinfammatory therapy. His earlier work on the stereoselective and stereospecific therapeutic and toxicity of drugs received high peer recognition. He also reported that pain and/or its trauma delays absorption of drugs which may render them ineffective. This is particularly important when a quick action is desired such as pain relief. His group found that inflammatory conditions such as arthritis diminish response to some cardiovascular drugs despite already known increased circulatory concentrations. His group also has reported the mechanism behind the adverse cardiovascular effects of both anti-inflammatory drugs and inflammatory conditions. Jamali has received many national and international awards for his contribution to science and public wellbeing.
