= Jamal-ud-Din Faqir =

Pakistani mystic singer

Jamal-ud-Din Faqir was a mystic singer from Sindh, Pakistan. He was born in 1952 at village Chhutan Wassan, near Bobi Station, in Sanghar. He also went to Rome to perform at the death anniversary of Jalal ud-Din Rumi in 2016. He died on 26 June 2016 due to intestine problems in a private hospital of Hyderabad at the age of 64.

== See also ==
- Allan Fakir
- Shah Abdul Latif Bhittai
- Shaikh Ayaz
