= Passinho do Jamal =

- Genre: Brega funk
- Inventor: Jamal (Romero Silva Oliveira Júnior), Eo Chapa (Pedro Henrique)
- Year: 2018 – present
- Origin: Recife, Pernambuco, Brazil

Passinho do Jamal (Brazilian Portuguese: [paˈsĩɲu du ʒaˈmaw]; Jamal's Little Steps) is a Brazilian urban dance and cultural movement emerging from funk carioca and brega funk culture. The dance is characterized by 'choreographed' leg and foot movements performed quickly and in syncopated rhythm. The dance originated from outskirts of Recife (specifically in the Santo Amaro neighborhood) and later gained nationwide and international fame in the mid-2020s, especially through short video-based social media such as TikTok and Instagram Reels. Two Brazilian content creators, Romero Silva Oliveira Júnior (known as Jamal or @jamal_da_capital, the namesake of the dance) and Pedro Henrique (known as Eo Chapa) were the original creators of the choreography.
