= Koyal, Jind =

Village in Haryana, India

Coordinates: 29°45′07″N 76°10′58″E

Koyal is a small village in the Narwana tehsil of Jind district of Haryana, India. It is situated 66 kilometers from Jind, Which is district of Koyal.

== Demography ==
The majority population of koyal village is Hindus small percentage of Muslims. Jat clans in koyal village are Punia, Madal and Gangus. According to the census of India 2011 population of village is 3343.
