= Jamal Itani =

Businessman and mayor of Beirut

Mayor of Beirut
- In office May 8, 2016 – July 29, 2023
- Preceded by: Bilal Hamad
- Succeeded by: Abdallah Darwish

Personal details
- Born: 1960 (age 65–66)

Jamal Itani ( Arabic: جمال عيتاني) is a politician, businessman, civil servant and owner of Levant Holding. He was the mayor of Beirut, Lebanon.

== Career ==
Before becoming mayor, he was appointed by Prime Minister Rafic Hariri as President of the Council for Development and Reconstruction of Lebanon from 2001 to 2005. He initiated and oversaw the building and management of Amman's new downtown, New Abdali, from 2005 to 2009 while CEO of the Abdali Company. He then went to Saudi Arabia to work with a leading Saudi construction company doing major projects in the defense industry. In 2014, he returned to Lebanon and became GM of Solidere. Jamal Itani was elected as Mayor of Beirut in 2016 for six years and is the President of the Committee of the Lebanese Mayors.

Itani holds a civil engineering degree from Georgetown University and a master's degree in civil engineering from the University of Pennsylvania.
