= Jamala, Hama =

Jamala, Hama جمالة
- Village
- Location in Syria
- Country: Syria
- Governorate: Hama
- District: Salamiyah District
- Subdistrict: Salamiyah Subdistrict

Population (2004)
  - Total: 725
- Time zone: UTC+3 (AST)
- City Qrya Pcode: C3225

Jamala, Hama (Arabic: جمالة) is a Syrian village located in Salamiyah Subdistrict in Salamiyah District, Hama. According to the Syria Central Bureau of Statistics (CBS), Jamala, Hama had a population of 725 in the 2004 census.
