= Jamal J. Ahmad Nasir =

Jordanian lawyer

Jamal Jamil Ahmad Nasir CVO is a lawyer and the former minister of justice in Jordan. He is a specialist in the rights of women under Islamic law.

== Career ==
Nasir was admitted to the bar as a barrister of Lincoln's Inn. In 1955 he received his PhD from the School of Oriental and African Studies, University of London, for a thesis on the subject of "The doctrine of Kafa'a according to the early Islamic authorities and modern practice, with a critical edition of the Zaidi MS Al-mir'at al-mubayyina lil nazir ma huwa al-haqq fi mas'alat al-kafa'a". He is the former minister of justice in Jordan. He has written two books on aspects of Islamic law formerly poorly covered in the English language.

== Selected publications ==
- The Islamic law of personal status. Graham & Trotman, London, 1986. (2nd 1990, 3rd revised Kluwer 2001) ISBN 0860108252
- The status of women under Islamic law and under modern Islamic legislation. Graham & Trotman, London, 1990. (2nd 1994, 3rd Brill 2009)
- Israeli occupation and the law of belligerency: The case for justice, morality and human rights. Jamal J.A. Nasir, Amman, 2010.
- Under My Wig' by Dr Jamal Nasir.ISBN 978-1-908531-33-9. Published by Gilgamesh Publishing 2013
