= Jamal Muhammad Abidat =

Jordanian politician

- جمال محمد عبيدات

Member of Parliament

Personal details
- Occupation: Politician

Jamal Muhammad Abidat (Arabic: جمال محمد عبيدات) is a Jordanian politician who served as Member of Parliament (MP) of Jordan.
