= Jamal Yagoobi =

Iranian mechanical engineer

Jamal Yagoobi is a George I. Alden Professor at the Worcester Polytechnic Institute (WPI), Worcester, Massachusetts. He was named Fellow of the Institute of Electrical and Electronics Engineers (IEEE) in 2014 for contributions to electrohydrodynamics.

Yagoobi obtained BS in mechanical engineering in 1978. He attended University of Illinois at Urbana–Champaign, graduating with MS and Ph.D. in the same field in 1981 and 1984 respectively.

== Career and Research ==
At WPI, Yagoobi teaches both undergraduate and graduate courses, focusing on heat transfer, fluid mechanics, liquid/vapor phase change, thermodynamics, and design of thermal systems. He has active research on enhancing heat transfer and phase change that has been supported by the NSF, NASA, AFOSR, SBA, ASHRAE and other companies.
