= Jamal Mohamed (disambiguation) =

Jamal Mohamed may refer to:

- Jamal Mohamed (born 1984), Kenyan footballer
- Jamal Mohamed Barrow (born 1957), Somalian diplomat
- Jamal Mohamed College, government-aided and self-financed institution in India
- Jamal Mohammed Ibrahim (born 1949), Sudanese poet, novelist, and former diplomat

== See also ==
- Jamal Muhammad (disambiguation)
