= Jamal Watson =

American writer and columnist

Jamal Watson is a writer and columnist whose work is regularly featured in Diverse: Issues In Higher Education and The Root. In 2001, Watson reported that Harvard Law School Professor Charles Ogletree and attorney Johnnie Cochran were planning a lawsuit on behalf of the descendants of African slaves. Watson served as the editor of the publication from 2005 until 2019 and remains a contributing editor.

Watson has also written for a variety of other publications including the Washington City Paper, The Baltimore Sun and USA Today. He holds a teaching appointment in Communications at Trinity University.

As a critic, Watson is frequently a guest on WNYC radio, an affiliate of National Public Radio and has appeared on Fox News' Hannity and Colmes and Nightline. He is featured in Dick Morris' best-selling book, Condi vs. Hillary and has been quoted in a handful of other books and publications. He is completing a full-length biography of the Reverend Al Sharpton which was scheduled to be published in Fall 2021.
