= Jamal Ehsani =

Pakistani poet

Jamal Ehsani جمال احسانی
- Born: Jamal Ehsani; April 21, 1951; Sargodha, Pakistan
- Died: February 10, 1998 (aged 46); Karachi, Sindh, Pakistan
- Occupation: Poet
- Spouse: Shanaz Jamal
- Children: Ali Jamal, Azar Jamal, Sabat Jamal, Hira Jamal

Jamal Ehsani (Urdu: جمال احسانی) (April 21, 1951 – February 10, 1998) was a Pakistani poet noted for his work in the ghazal genre and was a favourite poet in the student's circle of Urdu literature. He has written three poetry books. After his death, his complete poetry work was published as Kulliyaat-e-Jamal.

== Early years ==
Jamal was born in Sargodha, Pakistan. He received his primary education there, and moved to Karachi at a very young age. He continued his study in Karachi and worked in different fields. He died on February 10, 1998, in Karachi.

== Literary career ==
Jamal's two poetry books were published in his life, and one after his death by support of Dr. Fatima Hasan.

=== Kulliyaat-e-Jamal ===
Kulliyaat-e-Jamal is a collection of complete poetry work by Jamal Ehsani, which includes his three poetry books, Sitara-e-Safar, Raat Ke Jaagey Huay and Taare Ko Mehtab Kia. The work was published posthumously, in 2008.

It was regarded as a best work of Urdu poetry by many Urdu poets, writers and critics. The poetry is sharp and influential as,

Ye shehr apney hareefon se hara thori hai
Ye baat sub pe magar aashkara thori hai

Charasazon mein thi ik chashm-i-nadamat asaar
Ye maseehaon mein beemaar kaha(n) se nikla

Translation:

This city hasn’t surrendered to its foes
But this not many a man knows

Among problem-solvers there was a sullen face
A disease-stricken amidst messiahs?

== Bibliography ==
- Kulliyaat-e-Jamal کّلیاتِ جمال, Karachi
- Sitara-i-Safar ستارۂ سفر, Tabeer Publications Karachi, 1982
- Raat Ke Jaagey Huay رات کے جاگے ہوئے, Sindh Press Karachi, 1986
- Taare Ko Mehtab Kia تارے کو مہتاب کیا, Karachi
