= Jamali (given name) =

Jamali is a given name. Notable people with the name include:

- Jamali Kamboh, 16th-century Indian poet
- Jamali Maddix (born 1991), English stand-up comedian
- Jamali Shadat (1941–2021), Malaysian comedian

== See also ==
- Jamali (surname)
- Jamal, given name
