= Jamal Joratli =

Greece-based Syrian painter and businessman

Jamal Joratli (b. 1961) is a Syrian painter and businessman based in Greece.

== Biography ==
Jamal was born to Ismaili parents in Salamiyah in 1961 and studied mechanical engineering at the University of Aleppo. He now resides and works in Greece, Athens, which he first visited in 1988. He chose Greece "for its natural light and colors, which cannot be imitated even by the best photoshop application, and for its culture".

== Work ==
Exhibitions of his work have been held in the United States (New York), Germany (Düsseldorf), Lebanon, Jordan, Dubai, China, and Greece. He held a solo exhibition (The Silk Road) in 2016, first in Athens at the Benaki Museum and then at the Museum of Asian Art of Corfu. In October 2018 the exhibition was transferred to China, at the Dalian Modern Museum.

== Style ==
According to Klaus Sebastian, Jamal uses tradition as a basis for his powerful paintings, while real-life motifs are turned into "flowing colour energies". With his art, Jamal tries to look behind the surfaces, and to harmonically connect the oriental with the occidental artistic schools.

History of art professor Manos Stefanidis regards Jamal as a "pictor classicus" – in the way Giorgio de Chirico used the term, namely a painter first addressing the problem of positioning the subject in space – who integrates modern European painting in his art, "but with terms of locality and an emphasis on the personal agony of expression". According to Stefanidis, Jamal acts as a defender of "cultural reciprocity" between East and West, leading the artistic revival of the Arab world.

== Bibliography ==
- Jian, Chen; Jamal; Moraitou, Mina; Sebastian, Klaus; Stefanidis, Manos. Jamal – The Silk Road. Dalian Modern Museum.
