= Jamal Eddine Dkhissi =

Moroccan actor

- Born: 24 March 1951; Oujda
- Died: 24 March 2017 (aged 66)
- Burial place: Chouhada cemetery
- Education: Academy of Dramatic Arts in Moscow
- Occupation: Actor

Jamal Eddine Dkhissi (born 24 March 1951 in Oujda, died 24 March 2017) was a Moroccan actor. During an acting career spanning over three decades, Dkhissi participated in several works in theater and film.

== Biography ==
Dkhissi was born and raised in Oujda. After graduating from Abdelmoumen High School, he went on to study theater at the Academy of Dramatic Arts in Moscow. Upon returning to Morocco, he taught interpretation at the Higher Institute of Drama and Cultural Animation (ISADAC) in Rabat, training a generation of Moroccan performers. He was the ISADAC's director, and also held a tenure as the director of the national Mohamed V Theater.

Dkhissi's last public appearance was at the opening of the 18th edition of the National Film Festival of Tangier three weeks before his death, during which he received a vibrant tribute.

== Death ==
Dkhissi died in March 2017 at the age of 63, after a long battle with illness. He was buried at the Chouhada cemetery in Rabat. His Majesty King Mohammed VI sent a message of condolences and compassion to the late actor's family members.

== Partial filmography ==
=== Feature films (as actor) ===
- 2013: Ymma
- 2015: The Midnight Orchestra
- 2015: Les loups ne dorment pas
