= Jamal Lewis =

Jamal Lewis may refer to:

- Jamal Lewis (American football) (born 1979), American football running back
- Jamal Lewis (footballer) (born 1998), English-born Northern Irish football left back
