= Gamal Kotb =

Egyptian writer and artist

- Born: October 30, 1931
- Died: October 16, 2016 (aged 84)
- Occupations: visual artist, painter, and writer.
- Awards: the first excellence award from the ministry of culture (Egypt) – His book "Celebrity Inspirations" was awarded the Cairo International Book Fair award in 1994 – Honored within the activities of the Press Drawings Exhibition that was held at the Arts Palace in 2004.

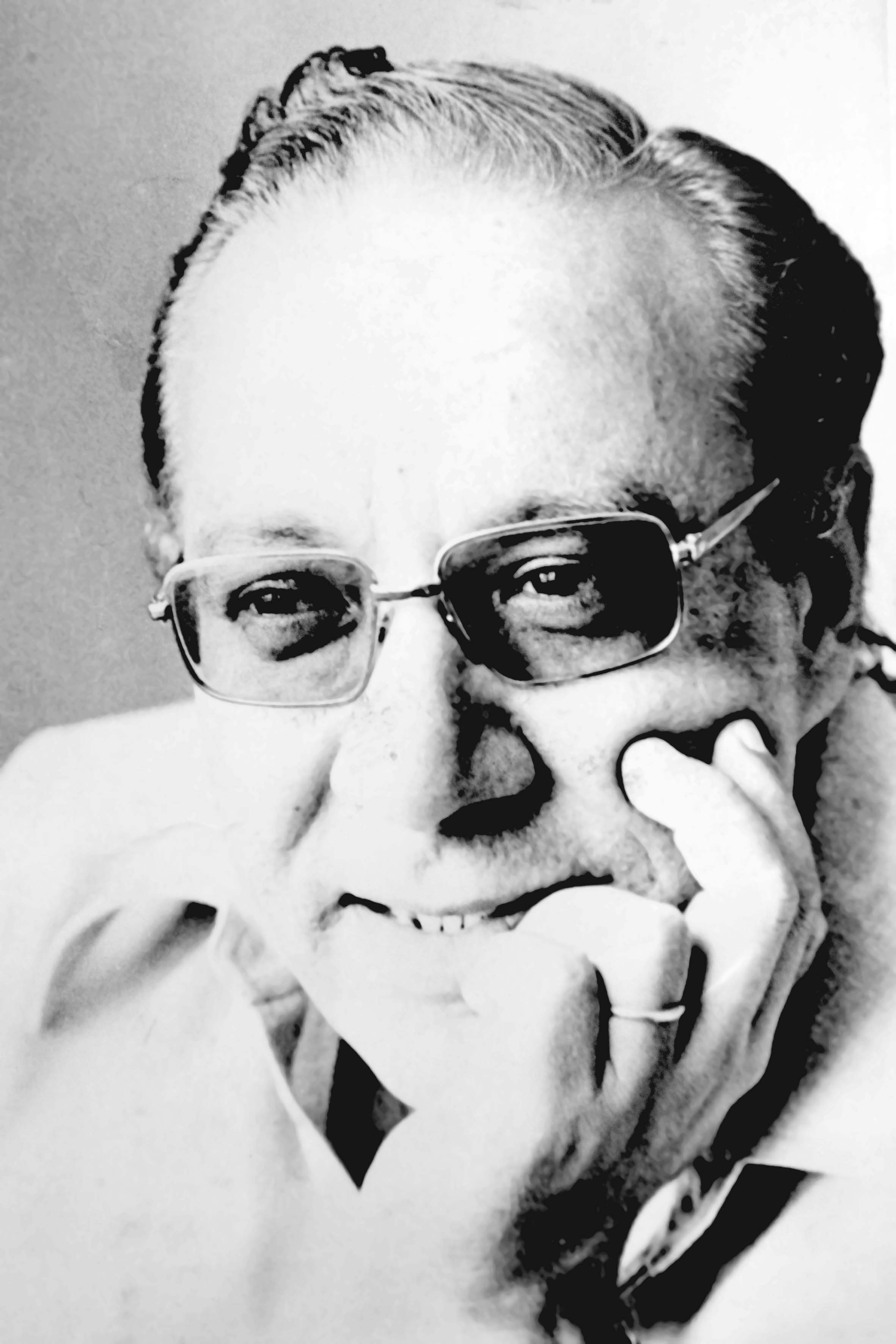

Gamal Kotb (Arabic:جمال قطب) (October 30, 1931 – October 16, 2016) was an Egyptian visual artist famous for his drawings that associated to literary works by a number of Egyptian writers.

== Early life ==
Gamal Kotb Ali was born in Tanta, Al Gharbia province, on October 1, 1930. He became the director of the Painting Association in high school. Where his attention was drawn to some paintings that were hung on the walls by Salah Jaheen who was a previous student of the same school.

He went to study engineering after high school. But he barely completed his first year because of his passion for art which pushed him to transfer to the Faculty of Fine Arts, where he studied painting and engraving. He was taught by the hands of three of the most prominent Egyptian artists who were Hussein Bicar, Jamal Al-Sigini, And Al-Hussein Fawzi.

He obtained a bachelor's degree in photography from the College of Fine Arts. During his studies at the college, he worked as a painter at Dar Al-Hilal Foundation. He became then the first painter for the magazines of Dar Al-Hilal after his graduation. And then he became an artistic advisor to Dar Al-Hilal Foundation.

Kotb was assigned to complete the historical paintings for the King Abdulaziz House Museum in the Kingdom of Saudi Arabia in 1976 and 1977. Then he moved to the State of Qatar to prepare the Heritage Museum in the capital, Doha.

He worked as a lecturer at Qatar University and an art expert in it. And he founded the free studio in Doha, where a number of Qatari artists graduated by him.

He worked as a professor of art appreciation and art history at the Academy of Arts in Cairo.

Kotb has been influenced by American artists as Norman Rockwell and the Italian Walter Molino and both of whom are magazine painters. Kotb says:

“I went to America and met Rockwell who taught me the technique of portraiture. He draws busy presidents who have no time. He is a master of artistic mixing and he is faithful to the era. He was a person who draws many sketches and chooses the best angle. His business was monopolized by Post Magazine. However, at the end of each year he releases a paintings album throughout the year. He came to Egypt in 1963 and painted President Abdel Nasser on the cover of Post magazine. Then I traveled to Italy and met Walter Molino in Milan. The most important thing I learned from him was that nothing static in his paintings, he was interested in movement which reached the point of tragedy and expressions that did not know silence. Molyneux was a photographer of hotspots, he had many students, and his works were famous in all of Europe. Learning from Rockwell and Molino helped me make my own style. I am a person who paint for simple people, so my style must be understandable to them. ''

== Artworks ==
Gamal Kotb is famous for his drawings that associated to literary works by a number of Egyptian writers such as: Naguib Mahfouz, Ihsan Abdel Quddous, Youssef Idris, Yahya Haqqi, Tharwat Abaza, and Muhammad Abdel Halim Abdullah. He was also known for drawing of war, movement paintings and hotspots. The most famous one is "The victory of Port Said volume", which was issued by the Egyptian Information Service in the late 1960s in several different languages.

Among the most important artistic works he made is the recording of the Gulf heritage in huge panoramic paintings, and the paintings of The Victory of Port Said volume, which was issued by the Information Service in the late 1969s in several languages.

Al Owais Cultural Foundation hired him to draw portraits for a number of its prize winners, whom are Yousef Al-Qaid, Al-Sayyid Yassin, Radwa Ashour, Amin Maalouf, Youssef Al-Sharouni, Ezz Al-Din Al-Madani, Muhammad Miftah, Mustafa Abdo Nassif, Adonis, Muhammad Al-Bastati, Abdel-Wahab Al-Messiri, Shukri Ayyad, Ahmed Abdel-Moati Hegazy, Jaber Asfour and Zaki Naguib Mahmoud.

== Exhibitions in which he participated ==
=== Private exhibitions ===
- private exhibitions of his work in Cairo and in Alaqaleem on various national occasions.
- " The Creative Touch in Culture, Press and Information Exhibition" at the Egyptian Cultural Office in Tokyo (July 2007).
- "The Creative Touch in Culture, Press and Information Exhibition" at the Egyptian Cultural Office in Paris (2007).

=== Local group exhibitions ===
- The first session of the Press Drawings Exhibition at the Arts Palace (he was among the honorees) (2004).
- The First Cairo Atelier Salon for Portraiture, Cairo Atelier (September 2005).
- Salon of Atelier (fifty-seventh) at Cairo Atelier (September 2009).

=== International group exhibitions ===
- The Eleventh Arab visual Artists Imprint Forum, Cairo Atelier (July 2016).

== Books and other writings ==
- Articles in a number of Arab and foreign newspapers and magazines, including the International Herald Tribune Magazine.
- Permanent section in both
  - Doha Qatari Magazine under the title of "Masterpieces of International Art"
  - Al-Riyadh Newspaper (a whole page was allocated to him in the Thursday Cultural Issue)
  - Saudi Aribia National Guard magazine, under the title of "Art and War"
  - Al-Raya Newspaper for Qatar
  - different writings in different magazines such as: Al-Arabi, Al-Arabiya, Al-Jawhara, Sayidaty, and other magazines.
- Three encyclopedias under the title of:
  - Art and war
  - Celebrity inspirations (he was awarded the Cairo International Fair in 1994)
  - Masterpieces of International Art

== Works owned by individuals and official agencies ==
- A painting of Queen Elizabeth II of Britain, which she keeps in her private collection.
- Several paintings acquired by many official agencies and institutions in Egypt, Qatar and the Kingdom of Saudi Arabia.

== Awards ==
- The first excellence award from the ministry of culture (Egypt) for his paintings of children's books (1988, 1989 and 1990).
- His book "Celebrity Inspirations" was awarded the Cairo International Book Fair award in 1994.
- Honored within the activities of the Press Drawings Exhibition that was held at the Arts Palace in 2004.

== His death ==
Gamal Kotb passed away in Cairo on Sunday, October 15, 2016. His funeral held at the noon of the same day of his death in the Mustafa Mahmoud Mosque.
