= Jamal Ismayilov =

Azerbaijani chief warrant officer

- Native name: Camal İsmayılov
- Born: Camal Vidadi oğlu İsmayilov; July 7, 1984; Neftchala District, Azerbaijan
- Died: October 21, 2020 (aged 36) Lachin District, Azerbaijan
- Allegiance: Azerbaijan Armed Forces
- Branch: Azerbaijani Special Forces
- Service years: 2002—2020
- Rank: Senior Warrant Officer
- Conflicts: Second Nagorno-Karabakh War; Aras Valley campaign; Battle of Hadrut; Lachin offensive †

Jamal Vidadi oglu Ismayilov (Azerbaijani: Camal Vidadi oğlu İsmayılov; 1984 – 2020) was an Azerbaijani chief warrant officer in the Special Forces of Azerbaijan. Ismayilov received the title of the Hero of the Patriotic War following his achievements in the Aras Valley campaign and Battle of Hadrut in the 2020 Nagorno-Karabakh war.
