= Jamal bin Huwaireb =

Emirati politician

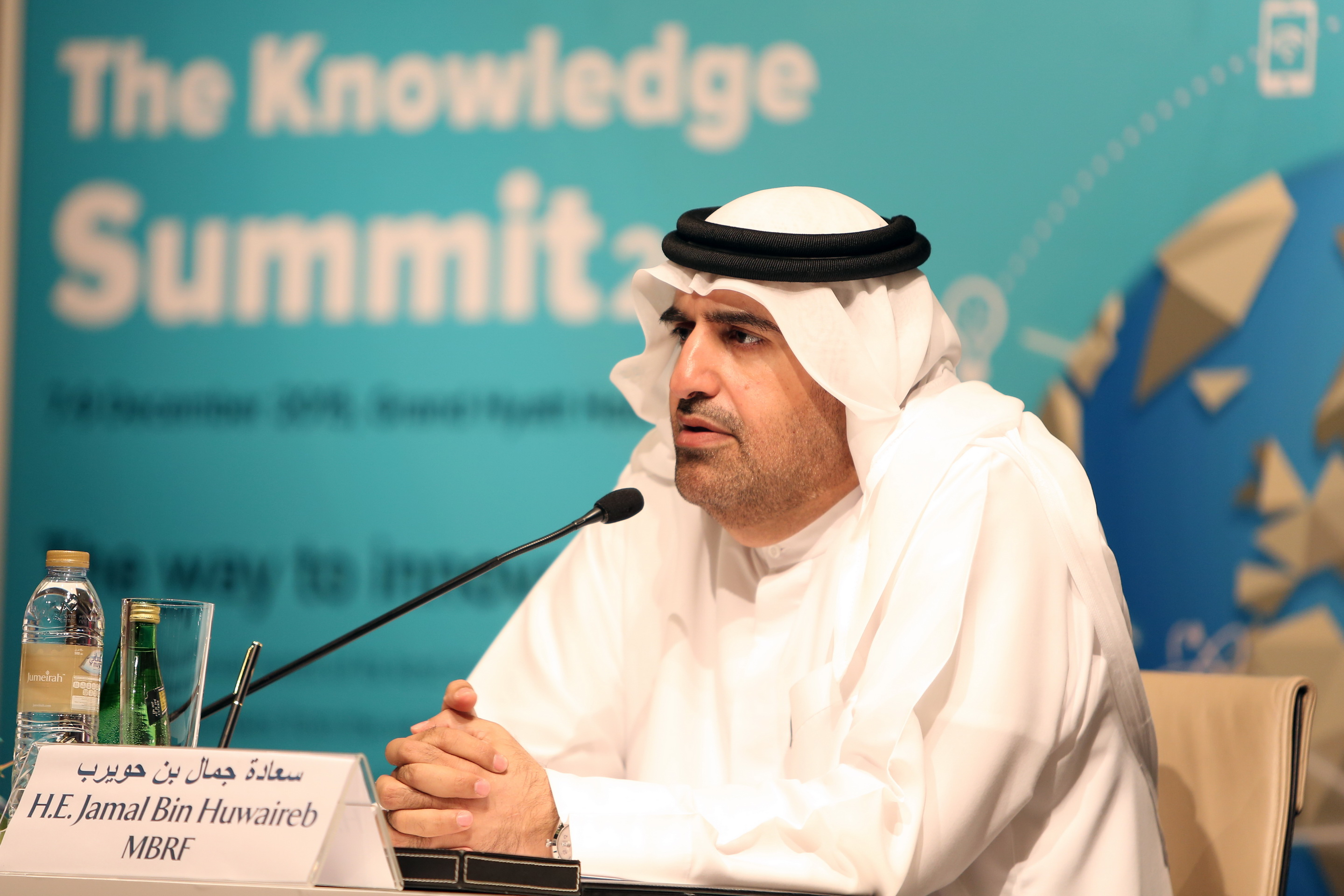
- Cultural Advisor to the Government of Dubai

Jamal bin Huwaireb is the cultural advisor to the Government of Dubai and the CEO of Mohammed Bin Rashid Al Maktoum Foundation (MBRF), also serving as a board member of the UNESCO Institute for Lifelong Learning.

Bin Huwaireb, an Emirati historian, and a writer of Nabataean poetry, has documented the cultural and creative movement of Emirate of Dubai, rest of Emirates of the country and the Persian Gulf region.

Having documented Arab and Islamic heritage, Bin Huweireb has presented the TV show 'Al Rawi' during the month of Ramadan for more than 8 years.

Bin Huwaireb is the co-founder of Dubai-based Dar Al-Sada Press, which has produced several publications.

== Writing career ==
Bin Huwaireb has authored books of poetry 'Lubna', 'AlFatena' and 'Al-Majd’, Hands of Sheba, Inscriptions on the Walls of Life, Diwan Ahmed bin Saleem, The Majlis of Caliphs & Royalties and others.
