= Gamal Esmat =

Egyptian physician (born 1956)

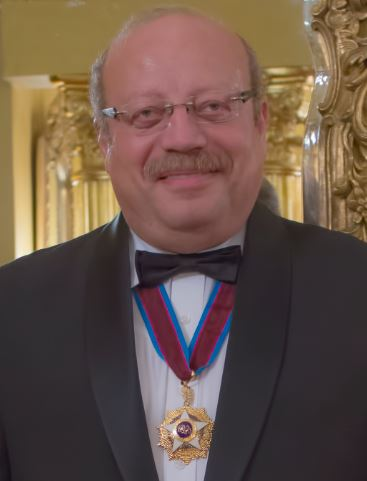
- Born: Gamal Eldin Esmat Gamil; 3 January 1956 (age 70); Giza, Egypt
- Education: Cairo University
- Years active: 1981 - now
- Known for: Prevention, screening and treatment of viral hepatitis; Hepatocellular carcinoma and living related liver transplantation
- Medical career
- Field: Medicine
- Institutions: Kasr El Aini School of Medicine, Cairo University
- Sub-specialties: Hepatology
- Research: Viral Hepatitis, Hepatocellular Carcinoma and Liver Transplantation
- Website: http://www.gamalesmat.com/

Gamal Esmat is a professor at Endemic Medicine and Hepatogastroenterology Department, Cairo University. He was vice president of Cairo University for Graduate Studies and Research.

Esmat has published scientific papers in journals on hepatitis, hepatocellular carcinoma and liver transplantation. Since 2001, he is the director of Clinical Research Unit, Hepatitis C Project, International Health Division, University of Maryland, Baltimore.

Esmat was the president of IASL (International Association for the Study of the Liver) during the period 2006 – 2008 and is recently the WHO consultant for management of viral hepatitis.

== Early life and career ==
Esmat was born on 3 January 1956 in Giza, Egypt.

Esmat is professor of Endemic Hepatology and Gastroenterology at Kasr El Ainy Hospital, Faculty of Medicine, Cairo University, Egypt.He specialized in viral hepatitis and its sequelae, as well as related and advanced techniques such as abdominal ultrasonography and different endoscopic modalities.

== Research and achievements ==
Esmat has worked in epidemiology, treatment and prevention of viral hepatitis, also enabling individualization of its treatment. He later developed further treatment strategies using the first Egyptian developed HCV Direct Antiviral Agent (DAA) for the hard-to-treat, interferon experienced and cirrhotic patients, revolutionizing HCV treatment.

=== Schistosomiasis Research ===
Esmat's researches started in 1985 through the Schistosomiasis Research Project. He was the co-PI, studying the epidemiology and prevalence of schistosomiasis in 12 Egyptian governorates. In this project, Esmat mastered abdominal ultrasonography for the first time in diagnosis and grading of hepatic schistosomiasis which was approved by the WHO as an ideal method for the diagnosis of schistosomiasis. This project had great impact in the control of schistosomiasis in Egypt that led to the decrease of prevalence from 40% in the 1980s to 2% in the 2000s.

Esmat contributed to the first textbook "Clinical application of 3D ultrasonography", by a chapter titled "Three dimensional ultrasonography in hepatogastroenterology". In addition, he also contributed in the hepatology text book "Zakim and Boyer's Hepatology", by a chapter titled "Parasitic liver disease".

=== National Committee for Control of Viral Hepatitis ===
Esmat established the Hepatology Clinical Trials Research Unit (HCTRU) in the National Hepatology and Tropical Medicine Research Institute (NHTMRI) in the Egyptian Ministry of Health in collaboration with the department of epidemiology and preventive medicine at University of Maryland School of Medicine in Baltimore, USA.

In this centre, many clinical trials were conducted and about 800 Egyptian patients were treated for free and the first trial to evaluate the efficacy of pegylated interferon for treatment of HCV genotype 4. In 2009, Esmat established the Kasr el Ainy viral hepatitis treatment center in Cairo University. This is areferral centre for Egyptian patients for prevention, diagnosis and treatment of chronic HCV. Esmat's work helped a national guidelines strategy in Egypt for the management of HCV, HBV and hepatocellular carcinoma.

=== Recent achievements ===
In 2013, when the directly acting antiviral agents developed, Esmat established different clinical trials in HCV genotype 4, then due to his research in this field, he succeeded, together with the national committee members, to introduce all the new drugs for treatment of viral hepatitis C genotype 4 with a very affordable price.

Esmat developed a system for recruitment of patients and database processing. This enabled a successful mass treatment of up to 150,000 Egyptian patients per year, by introducing the sofosbuvir based regimens. The plan was to treat 300.000 patients by the all oral antiviral therapy in the following years.

Esmat succeeded in the offering of variable DAAs (as sofosbuvir, simeprevir, daclatasvir, ombitasvir and paritaprevir, ledipasvir) in Egypt at affordable prices. Esmat's aim was to eradicate HCV in Egypt in the upcoming 20 years. His work was rated by the WHO as one of the most important strategies arising from research they have supported.

In late 2015, Esmat announced the results of a large clinical trial on an Egyptian molecule by Pharco. It was the first milestone in addressing the hepatitis C epidemic in EGYPT. This is a Phase III clinical trial of the combination of Ravidasvir with Sofosbuvir for the treatment of patients with Genotype-4 chronic hepatitis C virus, the largest study of its kind globally.

The lead Principal Investigator of the study, Esmat announced it at the meeting of the American Association for the Study of Liver Diseases conference in San Francisco on November 16, 2015. Results from the Phase III trial in 300 patients showed that combining Ravidasvir 200 mg and Sofosbuvir 400 mg once daily for 12 weeks resulted in sustained virological response at 12 week post-treatment rates of 98% overall. The study indicated the possibility of treating compensated cirrhotic patients with a high response rate when extending therapy to 16 weeks. No relapses have occurred to date in difficult to treat Interferon-experienced cirrhotic patients treated for 16 weeks.

== Honours and awards ==
- Medal of Science and Arts of the First Class from the Egyptian Presidency (2017)
- Nile Award for Science from the Academy of Scientific Research and Technology – Egypt (2016)
- Medal of Science and Arts of the First Class from the Egyptian Presidency (2013)
- State Merit Award for Medical Science from the Academy of Scientific Research and Technology – Egypt (2010)
- President of the international liver congress, San Francisco (2008).
- Nominated in Marquis Who's Who biography book as one of the most effective contributors to the field of Hepatology (2007)
