= Ahmed Jamal =

Ahmed Jamal may refer to:

- Ahmad Jamal (1930–2023), American jazz pianist, composer, bandleader, and educator
- Ahmed Jamal (cricketer) (born 1988), Pakistani cricketer
- Ahmed Jamal (footballer) (born 2000), Egyptian footballer
