= Raghda Gamal =

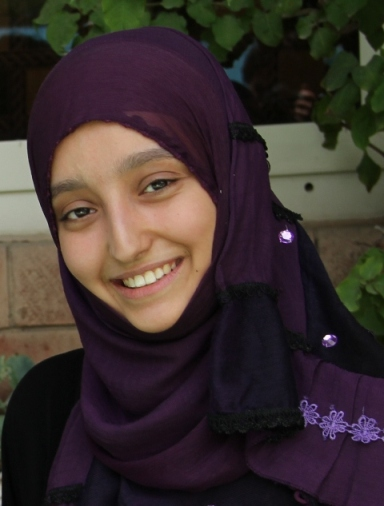
Raghda Gamal

Raghda Gamal is a Yemeni journalist and poet.

== Biography ==
Gamal started her career as a journalist in 2008, contributing to Yemeni newspapers in both Arabic and English. In addition to her journalistic work, Gamal is also a poet who reflects on her experiences during the 2011 political uprising in Yemen. Her poetry captures the essence of the events and their impact on society. Notably, two collections of her poetry have been translated into English, making her the first Yemeni poet to have a collection of poems translated into English titled, “Lost in a fairy tale” and a second collection of poems and photos, titled, “Once upon a Revolution”. In 2022, she published her novel “Al-Khaymah” (The Tent). She is currently responsible of the “Al Jazeera Ambassadors “initiative at the Al Jazeera Media Institute.

=== Publications ===
- Gamal, R. (2012). Once Upon a Revolution: Poems and Photos.
