= Jamal Akal =

Hamas member

Jamal Akal (جمال عكل) was a Canadian citizen arrested by Israeli security forces in 2003, and accused of conspiring with Hamas leaders to target and assassinate an Israeli politician travelling to the United States.

== Life ==
Akal moved to Canada in 1999 and obtained Canadian citizenship. In 2003 he left Windsor, Ontario and returned to Palestine to look for a wife, and became acquainted with Mohammed Bashir Abut Matar, who urged him to avenge the death of his cousin at Israeli military hands.

== Arrest and sentencing ==
Akal was arrested November 1, 2003, several days after arriving in the Gaza Strip. His lawyer Jamil al-Qatib complained that any information stemming from his 20-hour-a-day interrogations over a period of two weeks was useless.

Pleading guilty on November 24, he said that he had been counseled by Ahmed Wahabe to follow an unnamed Israeli politician touring the United States, and raise funds in North American mosques to purchase an M16 rifle with which to launch a sniper attack, killing the target. He also claimed that he had been told to attribute the attack to al-Qaeda, rather than Hamas; while Hamas denied any knowledge of Akal, stating that they limited all their actions to the Palestinian region.

Akal was sentenced to four years' imprisonment by the military court, and was released back to Canada in August 2007.
