= Jamali, Shiraz =

Jamali جمالي
- Village
- Location within Iran
- Coordinates: 29°20′09″N 52°07′13″E
- Country: Iran
- Province: Fars
- County: Shiraz
- Bakhsh: Arzhan
- Rural District: Kuh Mareh Sorkhi

Population (2006)
  - Total: 30
- Time zone: UTC+3:30 (IRST)
  - Summer (DST): UTC+4:30 (IRDT)

Jamali (Persian: جمالي, also Romanized as Jamālī; also known as Jamādī) is a village in Kuh Mareh Sorkhi Rural District, Arzhan District, Shiraz County, Fars province, Iran. At the 2006 census, its population was 30, in 7 families.
