= Georges Bohas =

French Semitist

- Born: 3 June 1946
- Education: Paris 8 University
- Occupations: University teacher, translator, editor, linguist
- Employers: Paris 8 University; École Normale Supérieure de Lyon

Georges Bohas (born in 1946) is a French professor emeritus at École normale supérieure de Lyon, a member of the Institut Universitaire de France, and a specialist in the editing and translation of Semitic and Arabic texts. He is a member of the laboratory ICAR.

G. Bohas holds a French agrégation diploma in Arabic.

== Contributions ==
G. Bohas is following Ernest Renan, with the revolutionary linguistic movement MER (an acronym for the elements of his new theory, matrices, étymons, radicaux), which seeks to innove this traditional lexicon system of Arabic and, by extension, that of the set of Semitic languages. For Bohas (and his disciples), triliter or triconsonant radicals are nothing but expansions (by rearrangement, reduplication, or consonant or semivowel increase) of articulatory binary ethics (what we might in fact call "biconsonanttic roots").

== Awards ==
- Senior Member of the IUF (2007).

== Some works ==
- Matrices, étymons, racines: éléments d'une théorie lexicologique du vocabulaire arabe. Orbis (Leuven).: Supplementa; Orbis (Louvain, Belgium).: Supplementa Orbis / Supplementa; Orbis. Supplementa. Vol. 8. Peeters Publishers. 1997. ISBN 9789068319170.
- Une lecture laïque du Coran, Georges Bohas, Gérard Roquet, 2018
- Islam et bonne gouvernance au XIXe siècle dans les sources arabes du Fouta-Djalon, Georges Bohas, Alfa Mamadou Lelouma, Abderrahim Saguer, Bernard Salvaing, Ahyaf Sinno. Geuthner, pp. 220, 2018, Les manuscrits sauvés des sables “the saved manuscripts from the sands”. 2018
- The Motivation of the Linguistic Sign in the Arabic Grammatical Tradition, Georges Bohas, Abderrahim Saguer, Nobile, L. Towards a History of Sound Symbolic Theories, John Benjamins, In press, 2019
