= Jamal Omid =

Iranian author, screenwriter, and film critic

Jamal Omid (Persian: جمال امید; born in 1946, Rasht), is an Iranian author, screenwriter and film critic.

== Career ==
Omid started his career as a journalist in 1964 with Khoushe (Cluster) magazine whose then editor-in-chief was Ahmad Shamlou. Omid later joined various cinema magazines including Cinema and Star of Cinema in 1976.

Omid is a cofounder and a former chairman of Iran's Cinema Museum.

== Filmography ==
Omid's filmography includes:

Year	Film	Episodes	Role
2013	Davaran	(TV series plot idea)	Writer
1994	The Last Port	(first story)	Writer
1991	Two and a Half Men		Writer
1989	Savalan	(first story)	Writer
1988	Train	(story)	Writer
1985	Janjal-e bozorg		Writer
1985	The Man Who Knew More		Writer
1975	Closed Eyes (first story)		Writer
1972	A Man for Rent		Writer
1972	Hakim-bashi		Writer and assistant director
1969	The Miracle of Hearts		Writer
1968	Keshtye Noah		Writer
1972	Hide Hide		Writer
