= Jamal Charles =

Jamal Charles may refer to:

- Jamaal Charles (born 1986), American football running back
- Jamal Charles (footballer) (born 1995), Grenadian footballer
