= Jamal Manakkadan =

Indian politician

- Born: 21 May 1961 (age 65); Ernakulam
- Years active: 2010-2025
- Political party: Indian National Congress
- Spouse: Rukkiya Jamal
- Children: Shaliya Jamal & Shameel Ahamed
- Website: http://www.kalamasserymunicipality.in/council

Jamal Manakkadan (born 21 May 1961) is an Indian Politician from the state of Kerala. He was the Municipal Chairman of Kalamassery Municipality for the 2010 to 2015 period in Ernakulam District. It was the third time he was elected as the chairman of the Kalamassery Municipality. He is a leader of Indian National Congress. Manakkadan started his political career through the Kerala Students Union (KSU) during college times. He also served as the Chairman of Chamber of Municipal Chairman.
