= Djamal Mohamed =

Footballer (born 1980)

Personal information
- Date of birth: 8 October 1980 (age 46)
- Place of birth: Marseille, France
- Height: 1.77 m (5 ft 10 in)
- Position: Defensive midfielder

Team information
- Current team: Cannes (sporting director)

Senior career*
Years	Team	Apps	(Gls)
2004–2005	ES Vitrolles		
2005–2010	Marseille Endoume		
2010–2013	Marseille Consolat		
2013–2015	La Cayolle		

International career
2007–2011	Comoros	3	(0)
- * Club domestic league appearances and goals

Djamal Mohamed (born 8 October 1980) is a football executive and former player who works as the sporting director of Cannes. As a player, he was a defensive midfielder. Born in the south of France, he played for the Comoros national team internationally, earning three caps.

== Post-playing career ==
Following his work at Martigues, Mohamed became the sporting director of AS Cannes in October 2025.
