= Jamal Kanlıbaeva =

Kazakh and Soviet scientist (1923–1974)

Jamal Musagalikyzy Kanlıbaeva (Kazakh: Жамал Мұсағалиқызы Қаңлыбаева; 25 June 1923 - 2 February 1974) was a Kazakh and Soviet scientist, doctor of technical sciences (1965), professor (1968), corresponding member of the Academy of Sciences of the Kazakh SSR (1970). Her main activity was studying the movement of rocks with the help of radioactive isotopes.

== Early life and education ==
Jamal Kanlıbaeva was born in 1923 in the family of a worker (later a political worker) Musagali Kanlıbaev. She entered school in 1931 (at the age of 9, immediately to the second grade) due to the frequent change of residence. In 1940, Kanlıbaeva entered the hydrogeological department the Kazakh Mining and Metallurgical Institute (now Satbayev Kazakh National Technical University), but after the first semester, she transferred to the mine surveying department, which she graduated in 1946. In 1946-1974, Kanlıbaeva was a junior, then a senior researcher, and lately a head of the mine surveying department of the Institute of Mining of the Academy of Sciences of Kazakhstan.

In 1952, she defended her Ph.D. thesis on the topic Calculation of surface displacements under the influence of underground mining in the Karaganda basin under the supervision of Professor Stepan Avershin. She became the first Kazakh woman to receive a Ph.D. in engineering in the field of mining.

In 1965, Kanlıbaeva defended her doctoral dissertation on the topic Regularities and methods for studying the process of rock shift in the massif and some issues of underground mining (On the example of the Karaganda basin).

== Career ==
Kanlıbaeva was the Chairman of the Scientific Council of the Institute of Mining of the Academy of Sciences of the Kazakh SSR, a member of the Academic Council of the Kazakh Polytechnic Institute, a member of the Department of Sciences of the Universe and the Earth, and a scientific consultant of the Karagandaugol Combine. She was a Deputy of the Supreme Soviet of the Kazakh SSR of the 7th convocation, for several years she was a member of the board of the All-Union and Republican Societies "Knowledge". From 1968 to 1974 he was a member of the Presidium of the Committee of Soviet Women.

Kanlıbaeva was the first Kazakh woman and the first Turkic female mine surveyor, who descended into an English mine, and the world's first scientist who studies the patterns of rock movement with the help of radioactive isotopes.

Jamal Kanlıbaeva died on 2 February 1974 from a lack of postoperative care. She was buried at the Kensai cemetery in Almaty.

== Awards and honors ==
Kanlıbaeva was awarded the Order of the Badge of Honour, Miner's Glory Medal of all three degrees, the anniversary medal For Valiant Labor, other medals, and Certificates of Honor of the Supreme Council of the Kazakh SSR.

A documentary about Jamal Kanlıbaeva was shot by director Vladimir Tatenko, screenplay by Nurlan Zharmagambetov.

== Personal life ==
Kanlıbaeva’s Husband Kazim Abulgazin for 28 years was the chief inspector of Kazakhstan for labor protection. They met in the reading room of the Mining and Metallurgical Institute.

Kanlıbaeva had a daughter Gulnara (a musicologist, and a professor), a son Rustem, a sister Dinalla, brothers Oraz and Arystan, and grandchildren.
