= Jamal Osman =

Jamal Osman may refer to:

- Jamal Osman (journalist) (born 1970s), Somali-born British journalist known for his work on the BBC's Channel 4 News
- Jamal Osman (politician) (born 1983/1984), Somali-born American politician and current city council member in Minneapolis, Minnesota

== See also ==
Jamil Osman (born 1950), Malaysian scholar

Jamil Othman Nasser, Palestinian politician (1945–2008)
