= Jamaludin Malik =

Indonesian politician (born 1989)

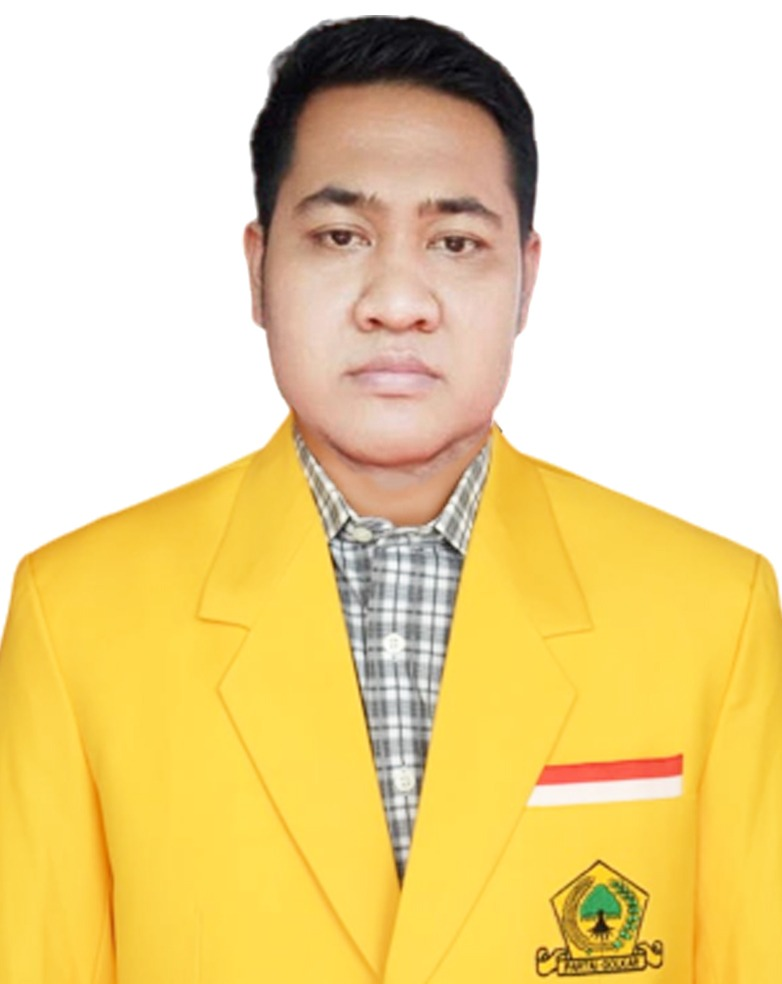
- 2024 election portrait

Member of the House of Representatives
- Incumbent
- Assumed office 1 October 2024
- Constituency: Central Java II
- Majority: 118,402 (2024)

Personal details
- Born: 1 May 1989 (age 35); Jepara, Central Java, Indonesia
- Political party: Golkar

Jamaludin Malik (born 1 May 1989) is an Indonesian businessman and politician of the Golkar party who is a member of the House of Representatives representing Central Java's 2nd district since 2024.

== Early life and career ==
Jamaludin Malik was born on 1 May 1989 in Jepara Regency, Central Java, as the eldest of three siblings. After completing high school in 2007, he worked as a laborer at Bitingan Market in Kudus Regency, until he stopped in 2011 due to a leg injury.

After stopping work as a laborer, Malik began to work as a marketing employee at insurance company Prudential, eventually becoming agency director of the company's local branch. He also runs a skincare business. During the COVID-19 pandemic, Malik distributed face masks and PPEs to hospitals and individuals in Jepara.

== Political career ==
Prior to running as a candidate himself, Malik had been part of another politician's campaign team.

=== House of Representatives ===
In the 2024 legislative election, Malik ran for a seat in the House of Representatives as a Golkar candidate for Central Java's 2nd district which included Jepara, Demak, and Kudus. According to Malik, he ran as part of Golkar after being offered a vacant slot after a party member had resigned.

==== Ultraman campaign ====
Malik employed an unorthodox campaign strategy, which included a campaign banner depicting himself wearing an Ultraman costume. According to Malik, he spent Rp 600 million (USD 40,000) throughout the campaign, and had six staffers. His staffers also distributed goods and aid to voters while wearing Ultraman costumes. He received 118,402 votes, the second highest for Golkar candidates in the district (behind incumbent legislator Nusron Wahid), and won a seat.

Malik was sworn in alongside other legislators on 1 October 2024, and during the ceremony, he also wore an Ultraman costume.
