= Jamaal =

Jamaal is a masculine given name, from the Arabic, meaning "beauty". Notable people include:

- Jamaal Anderson (born 1986), American football player
- Jamaal Bailey (born 1982), American attorney and politician
- Jamaal Bowman (born 1976), American politician
- Jamaal Branch (born 1981), American football player
- Jamaal Butler (born 1988), Bahamian sprinter
- Jamaal Charles (born 1986), American football player
- Jamaal Franklin (born 1991), American basketball player
- Jamaal Fudge (born 1983), American football player
- Jamaal Green (born 1980), American football player
- Jamaal Henry, real name of Maaly Raw (born 1994), American record producer and songwriter
- Jamaal Jackson (born 1980), American football player
- Jamaal James (born 1988), Trinidad and Tobago former middle-distance runner
- Jamaal Johnson-Webb (born 1990), American former NFL player
- Jamaal Lascelles (born 1993), English footballer
- Jamaal Magloire (born 1978), Canadian basketball player
- Jamaal May (born 1982), American poet
- Jamaal Myers, Canadian lawyer and politician
- Jamaal Pollard, real name of Mali Music (singer) (born 1988), American singer-songwriter and record producer
- Jamaal Pritchett (born 2003), American football player
- Jamaal Rolle (born 1984), Bahamian visual artist and journalist
- Jamaal Shabazz (born 1963), Trinidadian football manager
- Jamaal Smith (born 1988), Guyanese footballer
- Jamaal Tatum (born 1984), American basketball player
- Jamaal Tinsley (born 1978), American basketball player
- Jamaal Torrance (born 1983), American sprinter
- Jamaal Westerman (born 1985), American football player
- Jamaal Wilkes (born 1953), American basketball player
- Jamaal Williams (born 1995), American football player

== See also ==
- Jamal
