= Jamal Tirawi =

Palestinian lawmaker (born 1966)

- جمال الطيراوي

Member of the Palestinian Legislative Council

Spokesman for Fatah in the Palestinian Legislative Council

Leader of the Palestinian General Intelligence Service

Commander in the al-Aqsa Martyrs Brigade

Personal details
- Born: 1966 (age 59–60)
- Party: Fatah
- Relatives: Tawfiq Tirawi (cousin)

Jamal Tirawi (Arabic: جمال الطيراوي; born 1966) is a Palestinian lawmaker.

He is member of Fatah. He is a former member and spokesman for Fatah in the Palestinian Legislative Council and former spokesman for Fatah in that body. He is also a former leader of the Palestinian General Intelligence service He is also a former commander in the al-Aqsa Martyrs Brigade.

Tirawi's cousin, Tawfiq Tirawi, is the current intelligence chief.

In a Palestinian Legislative Council (PLC) session to discuss Mahmoud Abbas's proposal to hold a referendum on 26 July 2006, Tirawi said that, "the role of the PLC is to activate the dialogue between Palestinians and it is the right of the Palestinian Authority chairman to call a referendum...We, as Palestinians, have the right to give our answers in the referendum. A referendum doesn't mean stopping the dialogue."

In 2005, Tirawi was accused of recruiting a Palestinian teenager, Salah al Jitan, to perform a suicide attack. The teenage reported to interrogators that Al-Aqsa Martyrs' Brigade leaders pressured him to perform a suicide bombing after he fought with his father, threatening to kill him or release a statement accusing him of being a collaborator with Israel if he did not carry out the order. Tirawi, disputed the Israeli account, saying that, "the Israelis are liars," and that the boy had actually come to the brigades volunteering to perform an attack but that the brigades refused to use him since he was the only son in the family.

In May 2007, Tirawi was arrested during an Israeli raid on Nablus on charges or recruiting suicide attackers and supplying them with arms. Members of the Al Aqsa Brigades closed several streets in the centre of Nablus and burned tires to protest against the Palestinian Authority for not providing Palestinian Legislative Council (PLC) members with sufficient protection, and accusing the Palestinian government of "conspiracy with the Israeli occupation.".

In August, 2007 Tirawi was found guilty of being an accomplice in a 2002 suicide attack. In the attack, an al-Aqsa Martyrs Brigade member left Tirawi's home in Nabulus, and performed the attack in Israel, blowing himself up in the Bialik Café, a coffee shop in Tel Aviv. Israeli woman Rachel Tcherkhi was killed in the attack and 29 others were injured.
