= Jamaican Movement for the Advancement of Literacy =

The Jamaican Movement for the Advancement of Literacy, established in 1974, is a government body in Jamaica, an offshoot of the American National Literacy Board. It has specific goals regarding improving literacy rates in Jamaica.
