= Canadian Society for Pharmaceutical Sciences =

Canadian scientific society

- Formation: 1997
- Founders: Fakhreddin Jamali
- Location: Canada
- Official language: English
- President: Amyn Siani
- Website: www.cspscanada.org

The Canadian Society for Pharmaceutical Research (CSPS) advocates for excellence in pharmaceutical research, promotes the allocation of research funds, seeks involvement in decision and policy making processes and provides a forum for early scientists. It was founded in 1997. The Journal of Pharmacy and Pharmaceutical Sciences. is the official journal of CSPS.
