= Jamil =

Jamil (Arabic: جميل) is a masculine given name of Arabic origin. It means "handsome" or "beautiful" in Arabic. The Latin spelling variants include Gamil (used mainly in Egypt), Cemil (in Turkish), Djemil or Djamel (mainly in North African countries influenced by French spelling), Djamil, Jameel (mainly among African Americans influenced by English spelling) and Yamil (Spanish spelling). The feminine equivalent is Jamila or Jamilah (Djamila). Notable people with the name include:

== Given name ==
- Jamil Abbas (1927–2005), Iraqi footballer
- Jamil Abiad (born 1990), Canadian basketball coach and player
- Jamil Adam (born 1991), English football player
- Jamil Ahmad (1931–2014), Pakistani civil servant, novelist, and story writer
- Jamil Ahmad (Gilgit-Baltistan politician), Pakistani politician
- Jamil Ahmadov (1924–1944), Azerbaijani Red Army lieutenant
- Jamil Ahmed (1928–1997), Pakistani politician
- Jamil Uddin Ahmed (1933–1975), Bangladeshi military officer
- Jamil Akhtar (1930–??), Pakistani footballer
- Jamil Ali (born 1984), Singaporean footballer
- Jamil Alibekov (1927–2014), Azerbaijani writer and public figure
- Jamil Aliyev (born 1946), Azerbaijani academic
- Jamil Abdullah al-Amin (1943–2025), American civil rights activist and convicted murderer
- Jamil al-Assad (1932–2004), Syrian politician
- Jamil Awad (1937–2021), Jordanian actor, writer, and director
- Jamil Awoyejo (born 2001), English footballer
- Jamil Azar (1937–2026), Jordanian journalist and author
- Jamil Azzaoui (born 1961), Canadian comedian, radio personality, and musician
- Jamil Bachir (1920–1977), Iraqi musician
- Jamil Khir Baharom (born 1961), Malaysian politician and military officer
- Jamil Baloch (born 1972), Pakistani sculptor
- Jamil el-Banna (born 1962), Jordanian Guantanamo detainee
- Jamil Baroody (1905–1979), Saudi diplomat
- Jamil Bashir (1921–1977), Iraqi musician
- Jamil Baz (born 1959), Lebanese economist and academic
- Jamil Benouahi (born 1979), Moroccan football manager and player
- Jamil Mardam Bey (1895–1960), Syrian politician
- Jamil Mohamed Bubashit (born 1966), Saudi fencer
- Jamil Canal (born 1946), Brazilian footballer
- Jamil ibn Darraj, Arab Hadith narrator
- Jamil Dehlavi (born 1944), British film director and producer of Indian descent
- Jamil Dem (born 1993), German footballer
- Jamil Demby (born 1996), American football player
- Jamil Douglas (born 1992), American football player
- Jamil Elshebli (born 1979), Jordanian Paralympian athlete
- Jamil Fearrington (born 1986), Danish-American footballer
- Jamil Gedeão (born 1931), Brazilian basketball player
- Jamil Hamoudi (1924–2003), Iraqi artist
- Jamil Hanoon (born 1942), Iraqi football coach and player
- Jamil Haque (1956–1981), Bangladeshi army captain
- Jamil Hasanli (born 1952), Azerbaijani historian, author, and politician
- Jamil Hashweh (1903–1982), Palestinian social worker
- Jamil Hassan (born 1952), Syrian Air Force general
- Jamil Ibrahim Hejailan (born 1927), Saudi diplomat
- Jamil Hopoate (born 1994), Australian rugby league footballer
- Jamil Jabak (born 1955/56), Lebanese politician and physician
- Jamil Jalibi (1929–2019), Pakistani Urdu linguist, critic, writer, and scholar
- Jamil James (born 1986), Trinidad and Tobago sprinter
- Jamil Jean-Jacques (born 1975), Haitian footballer
- Jamil Jivani (born 1987), Canadian politician
- Jamil Joseph (born 1991), Saint Lucian footballer
- Jamil Karzai, Afghan politician
- Jamil Kasirye (born 1954), Ugandan footballer
- Jamil Khadem, Australian rugby league footballer
- Jamil Sahid Mohamed Khalil (1936–2000), Sierra Leonean-Lebanese businessman
- Jamil Khan (born 1991), Pakistani cricketer
- Jamil Ahmed Khan (diplomat), Pakistani diplomat
- Jamil Ahmed Khan (politician), Pakistani politician
- Jamil Hassan Khan (born 1957), Pakistani politician
- Jamil Jan Kochai (born 1992), Afghan-American writer
- Jamil Lahoud (1901–1983), Lebanese general and politician
- Jamil bey Lambaranski (1884–1959), Azerbaijani politician
- Jamil Lotfollahnasabi, Iranian table tennis coach
- Jamil Mahuad (born 1949), Ecuadorian politician
- Jamil Majdalawi (born 1946), Palestinian politician
- Jamil Majid, Bangladeshi diplomat
- Jamil ibn Ma'mar (died 701), Arab poet
- Jamil Merrell (1990–2026), American football player
- Jamil Mezher (born 1964), Palestinian militant and politician
- Jamil al-Midfai (1890–1958), Iraqi politician
- Jamil Molaeb (born 1948), Lebanese artist
- Jamil Mufidzade (1934–2019), Azerbaijani painter
- Jamil Muhammad (born 2000), Nigerian footballer
- Jamil Mukulu (born 1964), Ugandan militant leader
- Jamil Naqsh (1939–2019), Pakistani painter
- Jamil Nasir, American author
- Jamil Nasser (1932–2010), American jazz musician
- Jamil Othman Nasser (1945–2008), Palestinian politician
- Jamil Osman (born 1950), Malaysian Islamic scholar
- Jamil Ibrahim Pasha, Syrian politician
- Jamil Ahmad Qasmi (born 1961), Indian politician
- Jamil Qassas, Palestinian activist
- Jamil al-Rahman (1939–1991), Afghan warlord
- Jamil El Reedy (born 1965), Egyptian alpine skier
- Jamil Roberts (footballer, born 1998) (born 1998), English footballer
- Jamil Roberts (soccer, born 1986) (born 1986), American footballer
- Jamil Rostami (born 1971), Kurdish-Iranian film director
- Jamil Sadegholvaad (born 1972), Italian politician
- Jamil al-Saleh (born 1974), Syrian military officer and politician
- Jamil Salleh (born 1959), Malaysian politician and civil servant
- Jamil Al Sayyed (born 1950), Lebanese politician
- Jamil Siebert (born 2002), German footballer
- Jamil Smith (journalist) (born 1975), American journalist
- Jamil Walker Smith (born 1982), American actor
- Jamil Suaiden (born 1972), Brazilian cyclist
- Jamil Al-Sufri (1921–2021), Bruneian aristocrat, historian, and teacher
- Jamil Sulong (1926–2014), Malaysian actor, film director, and scriptwriter
- Jamil Takidine (born 2002), Belgian footballer
- Jamil Tutunji (1896–1981), Jordanian doctor and politician
- Jamil al-Ulshi (1883–1951), Syrian politician
- Jamil Rahmat Vance, Pakistani Army major general
- Jamil Abdul Wahab (1913–1973), Iraqi lawyer, judge, and politician
- Jamil Walker (born 1981), American footballer
- Jamil Wilson (born 1990), American basketball player
- Jamil Yamani, Australian video artists
- Jamil Sidqi al-Zahawi (1863–1936), Iraqi poet and philosopher

== See also ==
- Professor Jamil, a small municipality in south-central Goiás state, Brazil
- Cemal
- Gamal (disambiguation)
- Jamal
- Jamila
- Jamill
- Yamil
