= Jameel =

Jameel (Arabic: جميل) is an Arabic given name, and a surname. The meaning of the name Jameel is beautiful. Notable persons with that name include:

== People with the given name Jameel ==
- Jameel Cook (born 1979), American football player
- Jameel Jalibi (1929–2019), Pakistani linguist
- Jameel Dumas (born 1981), American football player
- Jameel Humadan, Bahraini politician
- Jameel Jaffer (born 1971), Canadian lawyer and human rights activist
- Jameel Mahmood (1938–1993), Indian general
- Jameel Massouh (born 1984), American mixed martial artist
- Jameel McCline (born 1970), American boxer
- Jameel Sewell, (born 1989), American football player
- Jameel Watkins (born 1977), American basketball player
- Jameel Al‑Yahmadi (born 1996), Omani professional football player.
- Jameel Shivji (born 2008), actor

== People with the surname Jameel ==
- Fathulla Jameel (1942–2012), Maldivian politician
- Hassan Jameel (born 1979/80), Saudi businessman and philanthropist
- Mohamed Jameel (born 1970), Maldivian football player
- Tariq Jameel (born 1953), Pakistani Islamic scholar
- Yusuf Jameel (born 1958), Indian journalist

== See also ==
- Jamil
- Yamil
- Jamal
