= Jamil Ahmed Khan =

Jamil Ahmed Khan may refer to:

- Jamil Ahmed Khan (diplomat)
- Jamil Ahmed Khan (politician)
