= Jamill =

Jamill or Jamille is a given name. Notable people with the given name include:

- Jamill Kelly (born 1977), American wrestler
- Jamill Smith (born 1991), American football player
- Jamille Matt (born 1990), Jamaican footballer
- Jamille Bittar, Malian politician
- JaMill (YouTubers), Filipino Youtubers consisting of Jayzam Lloyd Manabat and Camille Trinidad

== See also ==
- Jamil
