= Asif Durrani =

Pakistani diplomat

Asif Ali Khan Durrani

Pakistan Ambassador to Afghanistan
- In office May 2023 – September 2024

Asif Ali Khan Durrani is a Pakistani diplomat. Earlier in his career, he served as ambassador to the UAE until 2016, and later as the Ambassador of Pakistan to Iran.

From May 2023 till September 2024 he was the Special Representative on Afghanistan but was eventually removed by the government due to "clash" on policies, as Durrani differed on issues such as the forced expulsions of the Afghan refugees, arguing that this would further affect the relations between both countries negatively.

Durrani is a Senior Research Fellow at the Islamabad Policy Research Institute (IPRI).

== Early life and education ==
Asif Ali Khan Durrani originally hails from Quetta, Balochistan where he was born to a Durrani tribe of Pashtuns. Durrani holds a Master's degree from the University of Balochistan in Quetta, and a Masters in International Studies and Diplomacy from the School of Oriental and African Studies, University of London.

== Diplomatic career ==
He joined the Foreign Service of Pakistan in 1986. He served in various diplomatic postings in New Delhi, Tehran, New York, Kabul and London.

== Writings ==
He has written articles for English-language publications, including The Nation.

Diplomatic posts
Preceded by Jamil Ahmed Khan	Ambassador of Pakistan to the United Arab Emirates; 2014–present	Succeeded by Incumbent
