= Jamil Mufidzade =

Azerbaijani artist (1934–2019)

Jamil Mufidzade Cəmil Müfidzadə
- Born: February 24, 1934; Ordubad, Nakhichevan ASSR, Azerbaijan SSR, TSFSR, USSR
- Died: December 20, 2019 (aged 85)
- Occupation: painter
- Awards: Honored Artist of the Azerbaijan SSR

Jamil Miryusif oghlu Mufidzade (Azerbaijani: Cəmil Miryusif oğlu Müfidzadə, February 24, 1934 — December 20, 2019) was an Azerbaijani painter. He was the People's Artist of Azerbaijan (2002).

== Biography ==
Mufidzade was born on February 24, 1934, in Ordubad. He studied at the Azim Azimzade Baku Art School in 1948–1955 and graduated from Kyiv Secondary Art School in Ukraine in 1955–1956, and graphics faculty of Kharkiv State Art Institute in 1959–1962.

Individual exhibitions were organized in Poland (1972), Azerbaijan (1977, 1985, 1986, 1994, 2006, 2009), Russia (1977), Iran (1992, 2003), France (1991) and Turkey (1998). His works are in the National Art Museum of Azerbaijan, the Azerbaijan State Art Gallery, the State Museum of Oriental Art, Gorky Museum, Museum Ludwig, and Fine Arts Zanabazar Museum.

He died on December 20, 2019, in Baku.

== Awards ==
- People's Artist of Azerbaijan — May 30, 2002
- Honored Artist of the Azerbaijan SSR — December 1, 1982
