= Yamil =

Yamil is a given name. It is a variant of Jamil. Notable persons with the given name Yamil include:

- Yamil Asad (born 1994), Argentine footballer
- Yamil Benítez (born 1972), American baseball player
- Yamil Chade (c. 1921–2009), Puerto Rican-Lebanese sports team owner and athlete manager
- Yamil Ethit (born 1981), Chilean lawyer and politician
- Yamil Garnier (born 1982), Argentine footballer
- Yamil Misael Rezc Gómez, musician, composer of the score for the 2025 Mexican film Vanilla
- Yamil H. Kouri Jr., American philatelist
- Yamil Abreu Navarro, Dominican politician
- Yamil Peralta (born 1991), Argentine boxer
- Yamil Romero (born 1995), Argentine footballer
- Yamil Silva (born 1996), Argentine footballer
