= Jamil Yamani =

Video artist

Jamil Yamani is a video artist working within the areas of migration, cultural identity, borders and diaspora.

Jamil continues to explore migration identity, and other related themes within his work. While he originally apprenticed with Professor Ernst Fuchs, in Vienna, Austria, as a painter, he went on to complete a Bachelor of Fine Arts with Honours First Class and a Masters of Fine Arts from the College of Fine Arts, University of New South Wales. He majored in video art, an area in which he still practices today, combining technology with a special interest in social phenomena.

His work has been exhibited at artspace Sydney, Perth Institute of Contemporary Art, Perth, Performance Space, Sydney, Customs House, Circular Quay, Sydney, Space 3, Sydney, COFA Exhibition and Performance Space, UNSW, Sydney. His collaborative work has been exhibited in Taipei, Taiwan, Broken Hill, NSW, Gallery 4A, Sydney and Electrofringe, Newcastle. His screen-based work has been shown in Sydney and internationally, and he has given occasional guest lectures most notably at the Sydney arm of Boston University, USA. He has also collaborated with Professor David Malin to create the first new media visual component to accompany the work of a major Australian Composer (Ross Edwards) and presented in pre-eminent concert venues including the Adelaide Town Hall and the Sydney Opera House.

His latest work The Glittering City exhibited at Campbelltown Arts Centre was multi-screen video and multi-channel audio embedded video sculpture. Advice and mentorship was provided by two pioneering artists, Allan Giddy, a senior lecturer in electronic arts and Jeffrey Shaw a former Professor from ZKM but currently a director of iCinema, Centre for Interactive Cinema Research, COFA, UNSW.

He has an ongoing, if ambivalent, association with the Sydney artist group Boat-people.org
