= Jameel Humadan =

Jameel Humaidan is the current Minister of Labor and Social Development of Bahrain.

== Current positions ==
- Minister of Labour and Social Development since September 30, 2015, upon Royal Decree No. (65) 2015.
- Minister of Labour February 26, 2011 – September 2015, upon Royal Decree No. (14) 2011, and Royal Decree No. (38) 2014.
- Board Chairman, Labour Market Regulatory Authority (LMRA).
- Board Chairman, Family Bank.
- Chairman, Occupational Health and Safety Council.
- Head of Quartet Committee for Expatriate Labour Mobility.
- Head of Joint Committee for Evaluating Repercussions of the Economic Crises and its Impact on National Labour.
- Head of Committee for Reviewing the Status of Illegal Workers.
- Head of Talented and Outstanding Workers’ Ceremony Committee.
- Head of National Committee for Childhood.
- Board Chairman, High Council for Vocational Training (February 2011 – October 2015).

== Membership in boards, councils and committees ==
- Board Member, Economic Development Board (EDB).
- Board of Trustees Member, University of Bahrain.
- Member, Civil Service Council.
- Member, Civil Defense Council.
- Member, Education and Training Reform Committee.
- Member of the Ministerial Committee for Finance and Economic Affairs.
- Member of the Ministerial Committee for Legal Affairs.
- Member of the Ministerial Committee for Social Services, Communication and Information.
- Member of the Ministerial Committee for Infrastructure and services 2011–2014.

== Regional and international memberships ==
- Boards Member, International Labour Organization (ILO), since June 2014.
- Member, GCC Labour and Social Affairs Ministers’ Council.
- Vice President, the 16th Asia and the Pacific Regional Meeting, Bali, Indonesia.
- Chairman, GCC Insurance Against Unemployment team since June 2012.
- Chairman, GCC Labour Ministers’ Council 30th session, 2013.
- Board Chairman, Arab Labour Organization in 2011.
- Member, Social Insurance Expertise Committee for providing social insurance for GCC nationals working in Gulf countries.
- General Coordinator, The Standard Gulf Directory For Occupational Classification and Standardization.

== Arab and international participations ==
- Represented His Royal Highness Prince Khalifa Bin Salman Al Khalifa, Bahrain Prime Minister in the United Nations Security Council's Conference on Human Trafficking, New York (December 20, 2016).
- Represents the Kingdom of Bahrain in the annual conferences of the ILO, the Arab Labour Organization (ALO), and a number of other related Arab and international organization's meetings and conferences.
- Headed a number of joint committees on the Arab and GCC countries level.

== Major accomplishments ==
- Participated in establishing the new Bahrain Labour Law for Private Sector, issued in 2012.
- Issued a number of Ministerial Decrees regulating the Labour Law with direct impact on enhancing labour rights and unions’ activities in Bahrain.
- Launched many pioneer initiatives and projects in the field of Training and employment, such as the National Labour Market Observatory, the Occupational Standards Project, Graduates Employment Project, Hospitality Institute Project.
- Supervised and prepared a number of labour studies and programs in the GCC.
- Former Member of the Editorial Committee for Social and Labour Studies Publications.
- Received His Majesty the King's "Medal of Bahrain", (National Day, December 16, 2016).
- Received His Majesty the King's Medal of the First Class Efficiency as one of the pioneer national workers (National Day, December 16, 2009).
