= Jamil Lotfollahnasabi =

Jamil Lotfollahnasabi (Persian: جمیل لطف الله نسبی, born in Sanandaj) is an Iranian table tennis head coach who participated in Summer Olympic 2016 in Rio Brazil. He is the head coach of Iran senior national team in Asian and world table tennis championships.

He was the head coach of the Iranian national table tennis team at the 2018 Asian Games in Jakarta, Indonesia, and the Iranian national table tennis team lost to Chinese Taipei in the quarterfinals, but in the single event, Noshad Alamian won the bronze medal after defeating a Hong Kong player Wong Chun Ting. This historic Iranian table tennis medal was won after 52 years of waiting in the Asian Games and in the single event under his coaching Jamil Lotfollahnasabi.

He was the head coach of Iran's national table tennis team at the 2016 Olympic Games in Brazil. This was the first time that two male players from Iran participated in the Olympics, led by Jamil Lotfollahnasbi.

He has also been the head coach of the Iraq table tennis national team. In addition to translating the world table tennis federation Coaching Level 1 book, which is the first official book of the World Federation, he is also the International and Official Instructor of the world table tennis federation and is currently teaching table tennis as a teacher in various countries around the world.
