= Yamil Abreu =

Dominican political figure

Yamil Abreu Navarro is a Dominican political figure. He was a former director of the Municipal Board of Las Lagunas in Azua, Dominican Republic and was the former leader of the Modern Revolutionary Party.

== Extradition ==
On June 12, 2020, the Supreme Court of the Dominican Republic heard the United States of America's extradition request for Navarro. On September 9, 2020, President Luis Abinader signed the extradition to the United States of Yamil Abreu Navarro on crimes of illegal drug trade. "“The delivery in extradition to the United States of America of the Dominican citizen Yamil Abreu Navarro is ordered, on the grounds of the charge that is imputed to him in indictment no. CR 20 0007, dated January 9, 2020 of the United States District Court for the Eastern District of New York."
