= Jamil Jabak =

Lebanese politician and physician

Minister of Health
- In office 30 January 2019 – 21 January 2020
- Prime Minister: Saad Hariri
- Preceded by: Ghassan Hasbani
- Succeeded by: Hamad Hasan

Jamil Jabak (born 1955/1956) is a Lebanese politician and physician.

== Career ==
Jabak is an internal medicine specialist. He has been described as "Hassan Nasrallah’s personal physician".

In January 2019, Jabak was appointed Lebanon's Health Minister in a newly formed coalition government backed by Hezbollah. The Lebanese parliament granted a vote of confidence to this government on February 15, following months of political wrangling after elections in May. His selection by Hezbollah indicated the group's increasing influence in Lebanese politics, as the Health Ministry has one of the largest budgets in the government. Government positions are allocated proportionally to representatives from various religious communities, which were involved in a Lebanese civil war that lasted 15 years until 1990.

Following Jabak's appointment, Hassan Nasrallah, the leader of Hezbollah, stated that the organization would never use state funds for its own advantage and added that their choice for the position is someone who is closely aligned with the movement but not a member, describing him as a "brother and friend" and as "close and trusted". He also asserted that the ministry would serve all Lebanese communities. Nasrallah emphasized Jabak's non-membership in the organization, stating that this allows him to work and travel without fear of international sanctions. Political analyst Najat Charafeddine noted that Jabak, who studied in Ukraine and has worked in local hospitals, had managed to maintain a positive image in the international community. She remarked that his connections to Hezbollah were close but not direct, downplaying claims of frequent interactions with Nasrallah. She described Jabak as "unknown before he was appointed health minister, both politically and as a doctor". His appointment came amid concerns regarding the potential impact of cuts to international funding for Syrian refugees on Lebanon's already strained healthcare system, which serves nearly 1 million registered refugees. While U.S. officials remained wary of Hezbollah possibly diverting resources from the health ministry, the new government managed to avoid additional sanctions.

On May 15, 2019, Jabak met with Minister of Industry Wael Abu Faour to discuss measures to protect Lebanon's pharmaceutical industry. Jabak emphasized efforts to export Lebanese medicines, particularly to Iraq, and stressed the importance of supporting local generic production. The two ministers agreed on initiatives to strengthen the sector.

In June 2019, Jabak launched a new anti-tobacco strategy, following World No Tobacco Day. The plan included strict measures to prevent tobacco consumption among those under 18. During an event, Jabak expressed his shame over Lebanon's high smoking rates and the lack of enforcement of anti-tobacco laws, stating that the country's inaction costed the Health Ministry around $200 million annually due to chronic illnesses linked to smoking. He emphasized the need for increased tobacco prices, a ban on tobacco advertising, and the enforcement of existing anti-tobacco laws, and warned that restaurants allowing underage smoking could face closures or severe fines. To implement these measures, Jabak called for cooperation among various ministries and urged the government to pass legislation to raise tobacco prices. Jabak has stated that he views e-cigarettes, regardless of their nicotine content, and heat-not-burn tobacco products as equally dangerous as traditional cigarettes. That month, he also launched a major national campaign to address obesity, titled “Your health cannot bear it; lose some weight.” This initiative aimed to raise awareness of the health risks linked to being overweight.

In September 2019, ahead of his scheduled visit to the United Nations General Assembly with President Michel Aoun, the United States denied Jabak a visa, citing his association with Hezbollah amid increased U.S. sanctions on the group. In December, he participated in the Doha Forum, where he met with Qatari Prime Minister Sheikh Abdullah bin Mohammed Al Thani.

Jabak launched the Lebanon Clinical Trials Registry (LBCTR) in collaboration with the World Health Organization, marking it as the first registry of its kind in the Arab world. This initiative aims to enhance the transparency and credibility of clinical studies conducted in Lebanon, ensuring compliance with international medical and ethical standards while promoting scientific and medical development in the region.

In 2020, the Arab Hospitals Union awarded Jabak the Pioneer Figure Prize in recognition of his management of Lebanon's medical sector.

== Personal life ==
Jabak is a Shi'a Muslim.
