= JaMill =

Filipino YouTube content creators

- Born: Jayzam Lloyd Manabat; Camille Trinidad
- Occupations: Vloggers; content creators

YouTube information
- Channel: JaMill
- Years active: 2017–2021 (original); 2021–present (current)
- Genres: Vlog; Pranks; Comedy
- Subscribers: 1.05 million
- Views: 1.3 billion (peak)
- Last updated: 23 November 2025

JaMill is a Filipino YouTube couple composed of Jayzam Lloyd Manabat and Camille Trinidad. They are known for their vlogs, pranks, and challenge videos. The couple achieved significant popularity in the Philippines, reaching over 12 million subscribers before deleting their original channel in August 2021. They returned to the platform with a new channel in September 2021.

== Career ==
=== 2017–2020: Beginnings and growth ===
Manabat and Trinidad met through Facebook in 2016. Manabat is from Binangonan, Rizal, while Trinidad is from Gapan, Nueva Ecija. They created their YouTube channel in 2017 to document their daily lives. The channel gained a following for its prank videos and couple-themed content. Their fanbase is collectively referred to as "Mandirigma" (transl. Warriors).

In 2019, the couple was included in the lineup for the YouTube FanFest in Manila. They also developed a reputation as a love team. By July 2021, the couple received the Diamond Play Button from YouTube for surpassing 10 million subscribers. At the time of its deletion in August 2021, their channel was the ninth most-subscribed in the Philippines, with a total of 12.5 million subscribers and 1.3 billion lifetime views.

=== Music and business ventures ===
In July 2020, JaMill released a debut single titled "Tayo Hanggang Dulo" (Us Until the End) under Star Pop, a sub-label of Star Music. The song was composed by their talent manager, Perry Lansigan. During the single's launch, Trinidad expressed a desire to collaborate with Solenn Heussaff, while Manabat hoped to work with Michael V..

Outside of content creation, the couple established several businesses, including a merchandise line called the Mandirigma Shop. They opened a milk tea shop in Nueva Ecija in February 2021. In September 2021, they launched a car service business named "Shimmer and Shield".

== Controversies ==
=== Cheating allegations ===
In April 2021, Trinidad posted photos on Facebook accusing Manabat of cheating on her with multiple women. The issue was featured on the public service program Raffy Tulfo in Action, where two women involved in the controversy gave statements regarding the issue. Manabat appeared on the show, admitted to the affair, and apologized to Trinidad, stating he would not be a cheater forever. The couple eventually reconciled and continued their relationship.

=== Channel deletion and tax issues ===
On August 19, 2021, the couple deleted their YouTube channel, which had over 12 million subscribers at the time. In a statement, they claimed the deletion was done to focus on their relationship and personal lives. Trinidad later explained that she deleted the channel impulsively following an argument where she questioned if their relationship existed only for the vlog. The argument had been triggered by questions asked during a counseling session for a potential brand endorsement.

Following the deletion, posts circulated online appearing to sell their house and car, though Manabat later described these attempts as impulsive decisions made during a difficult time. The deletion coincided with an announcement by the Bureau of Internal Revenue (BIR) that it would investigate social media influencers who were not paying income taxes. On August 24, 2021, the BIR stated they were investigating a specific "celebrity couple" who had deleted their channel, leading to public speculation that it was JaMill.

Manabat confirmed in an interview with Kapuso Mo, Jessica Soho that BIR representatives had visited their home to educate them on tax obligations. He stated that they were complying with the requirements and processing their documents properly. The couple denied that the deletion was related to tax evasion, attributing it solely to their relationship struggles.

=== Return to YouTube ===
Prior to their official return, the couple hinted at a comeback through social media posts showing them editing video content. They officially launched a new channel on September 15, 2021. In their comeback vlog, they addressed the rumors surrounding their departure and criticized media outlets for publishing "fake news" about their situation.

== Personal lives ==
Manabat studied Industrial Engineering at the Technological Institute of the Philippines. Trinidad holds a degree in Marketing Management from Divina Pastora College. In a February 2021 interview with Toni Gonzaga, the couple discussed their plans to marry and start a family once they reached the age of 26.

== Filmography ==
=== Television ===
Year	Title	Role	Notes	Ref.
2021	Kapuso Mo, Jessica Soho	Themselves	Guest interview	
2021	Raffy Tulfo in Action	Themselves	Guest appearance	

=== Web ===
Year	Title	Role	Notes	Ref.
2021	Toni Talks	Themselves	Interview guest	
