= Jamil Hashweh =

Palestinian translator

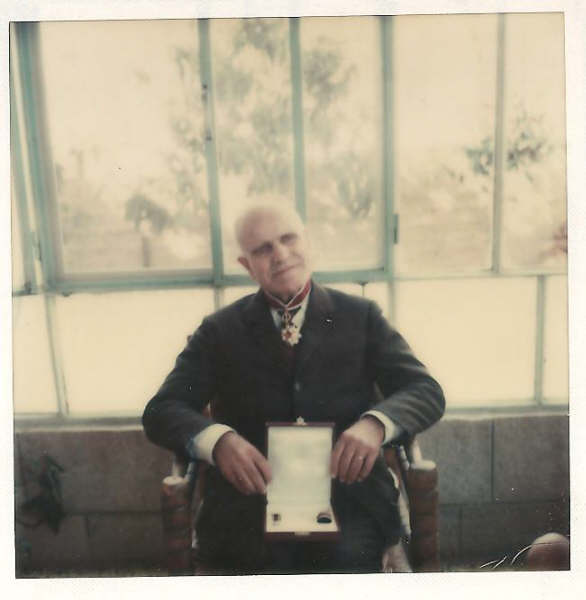
- Born: November 27, 1903; Gaza, Ottoman Empire
- Died: July 1982 (aged 78–79); Jerusalem
- Known for: Founder of Arab Organization for the Welfare of the Blind

Jamil Issa Hashweh (born 27 November, 1903 – death July, 1982) was the founder of Arab Organization for the Welfare of the Blind. He was a social worker and member of the executive committee of the Union of Social Welfare organizations in the West Bank.

== Early life and education ==
Hashweh was born in Gaza in the Ottoman Empire on November 27, 1903. He was the second child born to Issa Hanna Hashweh and Shafiqua Masaad. Hashweh grew up in a household amongst ten siblings; five brothers and five sisters.

During Jamil's childhood, a blinding eye disease pandemic hit the area and Jamil was infected. Due to poor and limited medical services, he lost his eyesight. His father, Issa, decided to register him in a German boarding school (Schneller) in Jerusalem where he graduated with honors and mastered Arabic, German, and English languages.

== Career ==
After graduation in the 1920s, Hashweh was appointed as a teacher at the American School in Beer-Sheeba. It also belonged to the Christian and Missionary Alliance and Hashweh became the First Elder of the church. He also volunteered his time as an interpreter for the American preacher and the Arab attendees. He was a strong Christian believer and extremely spiritual and equally worldly and open minded.

At the end of the 1920s, Hashweh moved to Jerusalem and set up a translation office. In 1932, Jamil established the Arab Organization for the Welfare of the Blind with his friend Sobhi Al Dajani. An AUB Graduate himself, Al Dajani and Hashweh devoted themselves and their services to the blind cause. The organization was located on Jaffa Gate on the border between East and West Jerusalem on Jaffa Road. The aim of the organization was to enhance and improve the lives of the blind by providing manufacturing jobs to them. The workers made wooden brushes and brooms as well as cane wood stools in the factories. Most of the equipment was designed by Hashweh himself. Due to the 1948 war, they were forced to flee and leave all their assets behind. They restarted from the ground up again in 1950 as the Arab Blind Organization, on Via Dolorosa Street in Jerusalem, where Hashweh was the Managing Director and Executive Board Secretary until 1964. During this period, Hashweh expanded and established two more branches of the Arab Blind Organization. One was located in Hebron in the West Bank and the other in Amman, Jordan.

== Books ==
Hashweh was extremely cultured and well-read on literature, poetry and politics. He also wrote hymns for the church and other Arabic poems. In 1950, Hashweh founded and edited the first Braille Arabic magazine for the blind. The magazine, “Call of Conscience”, was distributed to various Arab countries and published by the Alaiye Blind School in Al-Bira which was founded and managed by Sobhi Al Dajani.

Hashweh was a member of a team from Egypt, Lebanon and Palestine / Jordan assigned to apply Braille into Arabic. Sobhi Al Dajani was responsible for transcribing the Quran into Braille and requested Hashweh to participate in proofreading the text due to his higher knowledge of the Arabic language. Hashweh had also headed and supervised transcribing the New Testament in Braille.

In 1964, Helen Keller House requested Hashweh to establish and manage its new transcribing division, whose target was to transcribe Arabic education textbooks into Braille. At that time, Hashweh was assisted by his daughter, Shafiqua and continued work with the Helen Keller Association until 1972.

Hashweh's work and dedication were not only limited to the needs of the blind, but he was also a social worker and was for several years member of the executive committee of the Union of Social Welfare organizations in the West Bank.

Jamil had a love for classical music and played the violin, piano, accordion and flute. He was also on the board of the National Library for the Blind, which provided educational university books.

== Recognition ==
In appreciation of his efforts, King Hussein of Jordan decorated Hashweh with the Al Istiqlal (Independence) Medal.

== Personal life ==
In 1936, Hashweh met Rose Massad in Jerusalem through mutual friends. At the time, he was looking for somebody to help him at the translation office and Rose impressively spoke Arabic, English, and German. Hashweh and Rose got married and went on to have three children: Shafiqua, Wahib and Nael.

== Death ==
By the end of 1979 Hashweh had a stroke. He died in his home in Jerusalem in July 1982 at the age of 80.
