= Jamil Khadem =

Rugby league footballer

Personal information
- Full name: Jamil Khadem

Playing information
- Position: Wing
Club
Years	Team	Pld	T	G	FG	P
1995–1995	South Sydney Rabbitohs	4	1	0	0	4

Jamil Khadem is a former professional rugby league footballer who played in the 1990s. His preferred position was wing.
