= Jamil Baloch =

Pakistani sculptor

- Born: June 12, 1972 (age 54); Nushki, Pakistan
- Occupation: Artist

Jamil Baloch (born 12 June 1972) is a Pakistani sculptor. His work narrates the impact of social and political barriers upon the society. He works in multiple mediums. He is currently teaching at National College of Arts Lahore.

== Life and education ==
Jamil Baloch was born on June 12, 1972, in Nushki, Baluchistan. He got early education from Nushki and graduated from National College of Arts Lahore in 1997. He is the recipient of the Presidential Award, “Thamgha-e-Imtiaz” 2024. Pride of performance “Sadiquain award”. His work was Selected work for Winsor Newton Millennium Competition, London, UK. He received 1st Prize international art competition, Jeddah, Saudi Arabia. He further achieved Rangoonwala 1st Prize, Karachi. 2nd Prize Art Biennale Bangladesh. Young Artist 1st Prize, Lahore. Family Planning 1st Prize, Balochistan. Photography 1st Prize, Lahore. National Exhibition, Lahore.

== Art career ==
Jamil Baloch works signify different behaviors of a society. Being from a rich cultural heritage, he incorporates the traditional models with modernity in his art. Most of his earlier works interpret violence and cruelty of power and continuous attempt for survival by mankind.

He always explores diverse mediums and has been artist in resident Vermont Studio Center, USA. He was also awarded by Rangoonwala Award in national Exhibition of Visual Arts in 2003, Karachi and Honorable Prize International Art Biennale in 2008, Bangladesh.
