= Jamil Tutunji =

Jordanian doctor (1896–1981)

- جميل توتنجي

Jordanian Minister of Health
- In office 1951–1962
- Preceded by: Husayn al-Khalidi
- Succeeded by: Abdelsalam al-Majali

Jordanian Ambassador to Russia of Jordan to Soviet Union
- In office March 30, 1964 – 1965
- Preceded by: Position established
- Succeeded by: Abdallah Salamé Zureikat

Personal details
- Born: 1896
- Died: 1981 (aged 84–85)
- Education: American University of Beirut, Medical University of Constantinople.

Jamil Tutunji (1896–1981) was a Jordanian doctor and politician who served as Minister of Health and Ambassador to the Soviet Union.

== Career ==
In 1918, Tutunji was a Medical Officer in the Ottoman Army. From 1919 to 1922, he practiced as a Physician in the Madeba District. In 1923, he entered the Arab Legion. From 1923 to 1940, he was the Royal Physician.

From 1940 to 1950, Tutunji was the Director of Health. From 1950 to 1951, he was the Deputy Minister of Health. From 1951 to 1962, he was the Minister of Health and Social Affairs. From 1962 to 1963, he was appointed as a member of the Senate.

On 30 March 1964 to 1965, Tutunji was appointed as Jordan's first ambassador to the Soviet Union in Moscow, serving until 1965. From 1967 to 1971, he was appointed as a member of the Senate.

== Awards and honours ==
- Order of the Star of Jordan
- Knight of the Order of Saint John (chartered 1888)
- Knight of the Order of the Holy Sepulchre
- Decoration of Revolution and of Independence
