= Gorky Museum =

Architectural landmark in Moscow, Russia

Coordinates: 55°45′29″N 37°35′47″E

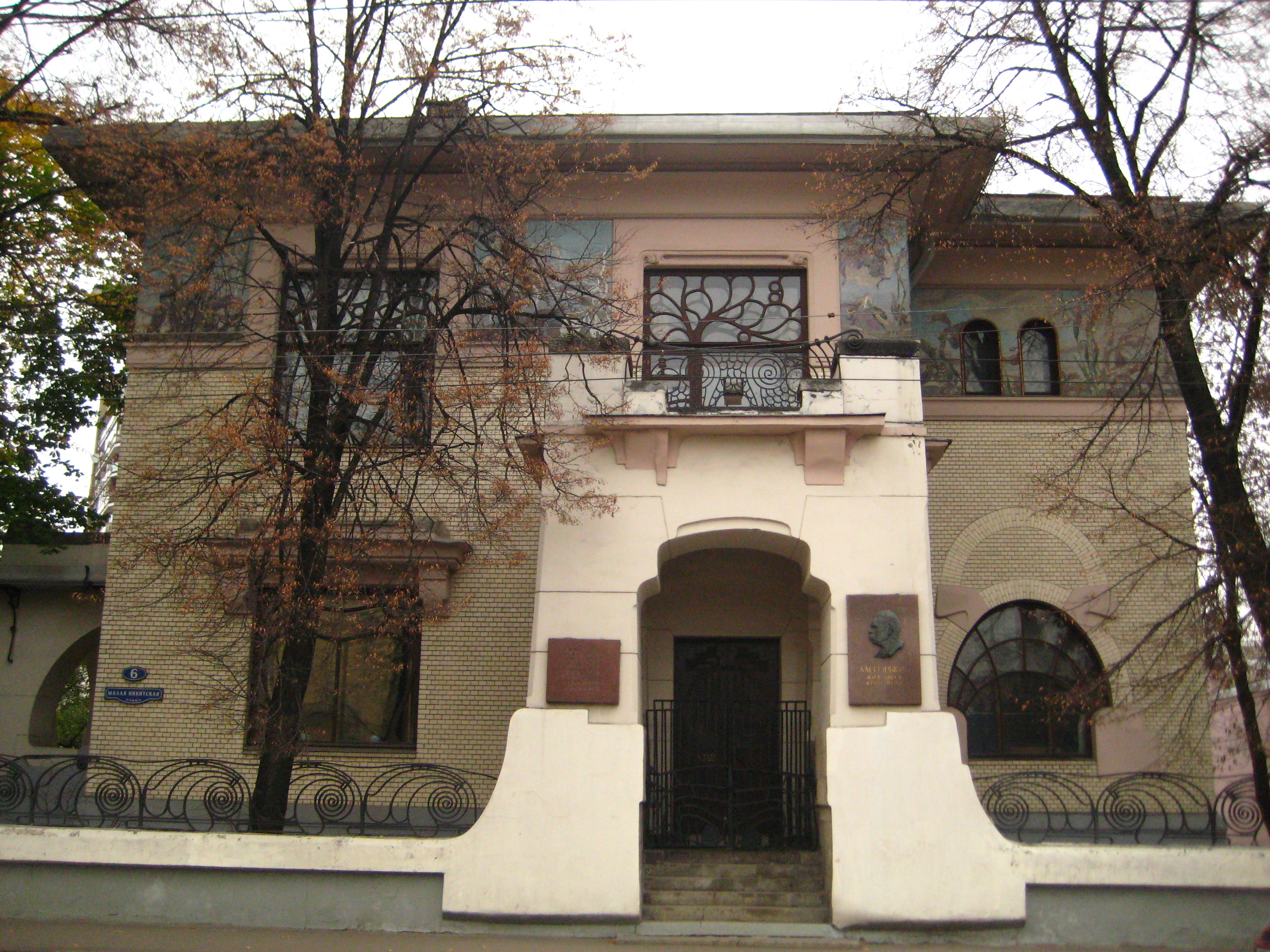
The Ryabushinsky House, now the Gorky Museum, designed by Fyodor Schechtel (1900–1903)

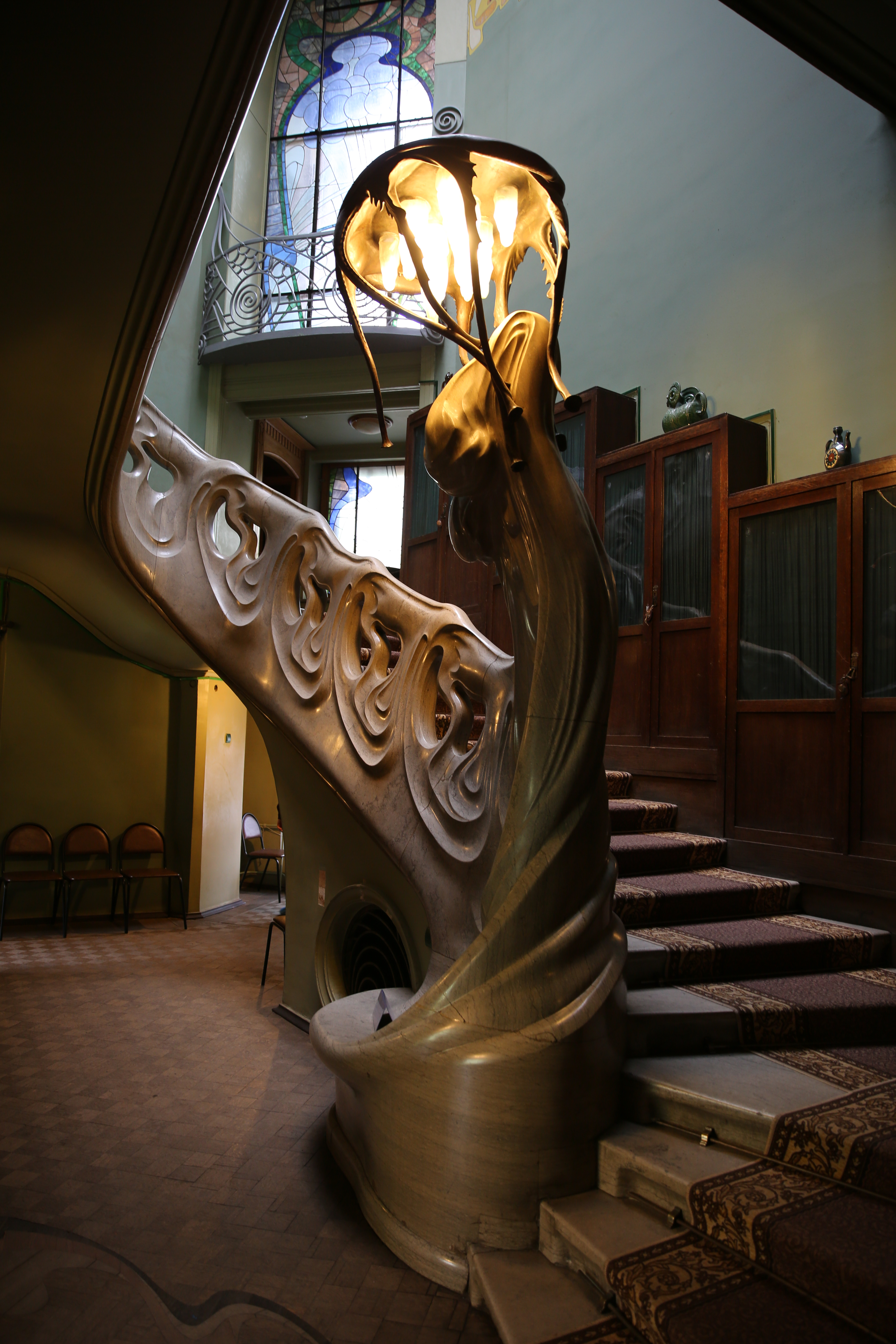
The main stairway and Medusa (jellyfish) lamp

The Gorky Museum is an architectural landmark of the "Moderne" style, the Russian term for Art Nouveau. It was built in Moscow between 1900 and 1903 by Russian architect Fyodor Schechtel. It is also known as the Ryabouchinsky House, for the young Russian industrialist and art collector for whom it was built. After the Russian Revolution in 1917, the Ryabouchinsky family emigrated to France. In 1931 the Soviet government offered the house to the writer Maxim Gorky and his family. It was his home until his death in 1936. The widow of Gorky's son continued to live in the house until her death in 1965. It then became the Gorky Museum, dedicated to his life and work. It is located in the historic center of Moscow, at 6 Malaya Nikitskaya. Admission is free.

== History ==
=== The Ryabouchinsky House - Construction ===
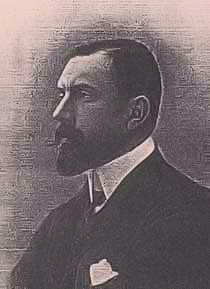
Stepan Ryabushinsky, who commissioned the house (c. 1900)

The house was designed and built 1900–03 by the architect Fyodor Schechtel for the wealthy Russian banker, industrialist and newspaper publisher Stepan Ryabouchinsky, who at the time of construction was only twenty-six years old. His father, of peasant origin, had built an industrial empire, based on textile mills and many other businesses, and shared by his nine sons. Stepan himself was also an art patron who assembled a noted collection of Russian icons. In addition to being patrons of the arts, the family members were Old Believers, an Orthodox doctrine condemned by the official Russian Orthodox Church. The design of the building included a small Old Believer Chapel hidden discreetly under a corner of the roof.

Contemporary Russian critics praised Schechtel's design for its "boldness" and "courage," although they noted that the massive entrance porch and large windows on the first floor were inconvenient and illogical. The building led to other more important commissions for Schechtel, including the Moscow Yaroslavsky railway station, his largest Moscow work.

The Ryabouchinsky family continued to prosper and expand its enterprises. In 1916, they constructed the first automobile factory in Russia. But in 1917, following the Russian Revolution, all the property of the family was seized by the Bolsheviks. The Ryabouchinskys left behind their home and departed Moscow for Italy. Stepan died in Milan in 1942.

=== Soviet Period to the present ===
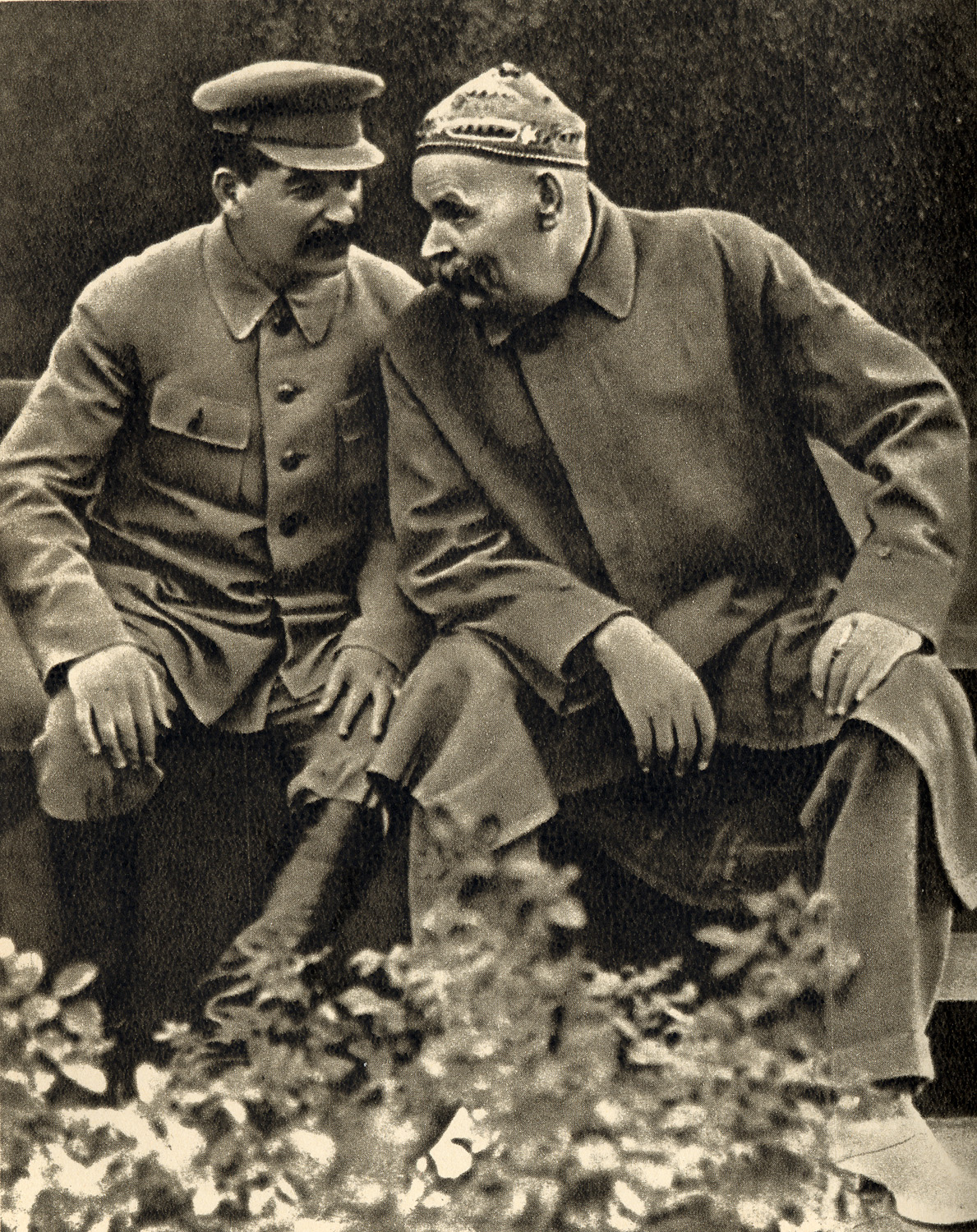
Stalin with Gorky (1931)

After the Revolution the house was occupied by a series Soviet state institutions; a committee for relations with foreign communist parties; the state institute of psychoanalysis, and then a kindergarten. In 1931, Stalin and the Soviet government offered the house and a dacha in the suburbs to Maxim Gorky, the most famous living Russian writer, who was living in Sorrento, Italy, but regularly visited Moscow. Gorky accepted and occupied the house with his family until his death in 1936, though after 1934 he was not permitted to travel abroad. Stalin and other Bolshevik leaders visited Gorky in the house several times before his death.

Gorky and his son lived on the ground floor, while the rest of his family lived on the upper two floors. Following Gorky's death, Nadejda Pechkova, the widow of Gorky's son, was allowed to occupy several rooms until her death in 1965. Then the house officially became the Gorky Museum, displaying objects related to his life and work.

== Architecture ==
=== Facade ===
The design of the house and interior is a blend of the 'Style Moderne', the Russian term for Art Nouveau, and elements of the symbolist movement of the end of the 19th century. The asymmetric forms of the roof contrast with the curving forms of the mosaic frescoes, the portals, the frames of the windows, and the balustrades of cast iron. The iron decoration over the entrance suggests a tree, while the wrought iron balustrade around the base of the house has spiral forms, suggesting waves.

The facade of the house combined elements of Moderne with traditional Russian forms. The massive concrete front porch, for example, looked like the entrance of a cave or grotto, but also resembled the "kryltso", the ceremonial porch Russian churches of the 17th century. and the small narrow windows on the right upper floor resembled those of a "terem", a medieval style of Russian residence. The elaborate wrought ironwork and colorful ceramic decoration were both Art Nouveau and a recollection of medieval Moscow palaces. The wrought iron decoration on the facade also had a marine theme, resembling fish scales, while the design on the mahogany front door had lotus ornaments made of brass.

In addition, the facade was decorated with glazed hollow bricks, a backdrop for iron railings and large windows with wooden mullions. The most colorful element of the facade was the mosaic frieze of Iris flowers against clouds and blue sky.

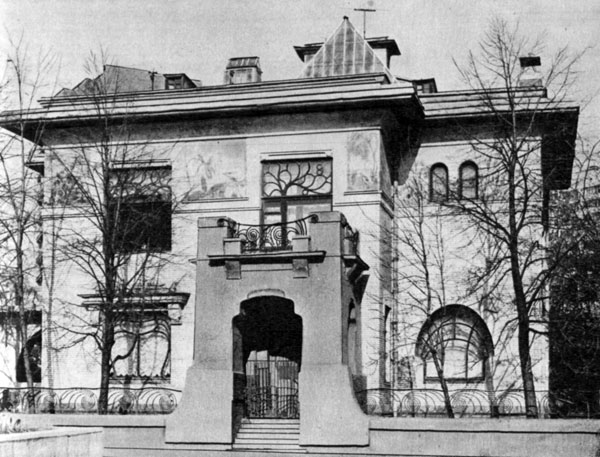
View of the house in early 1900s

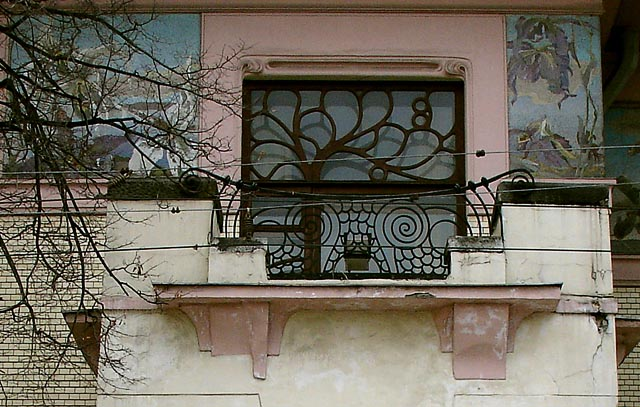
South facade decoration

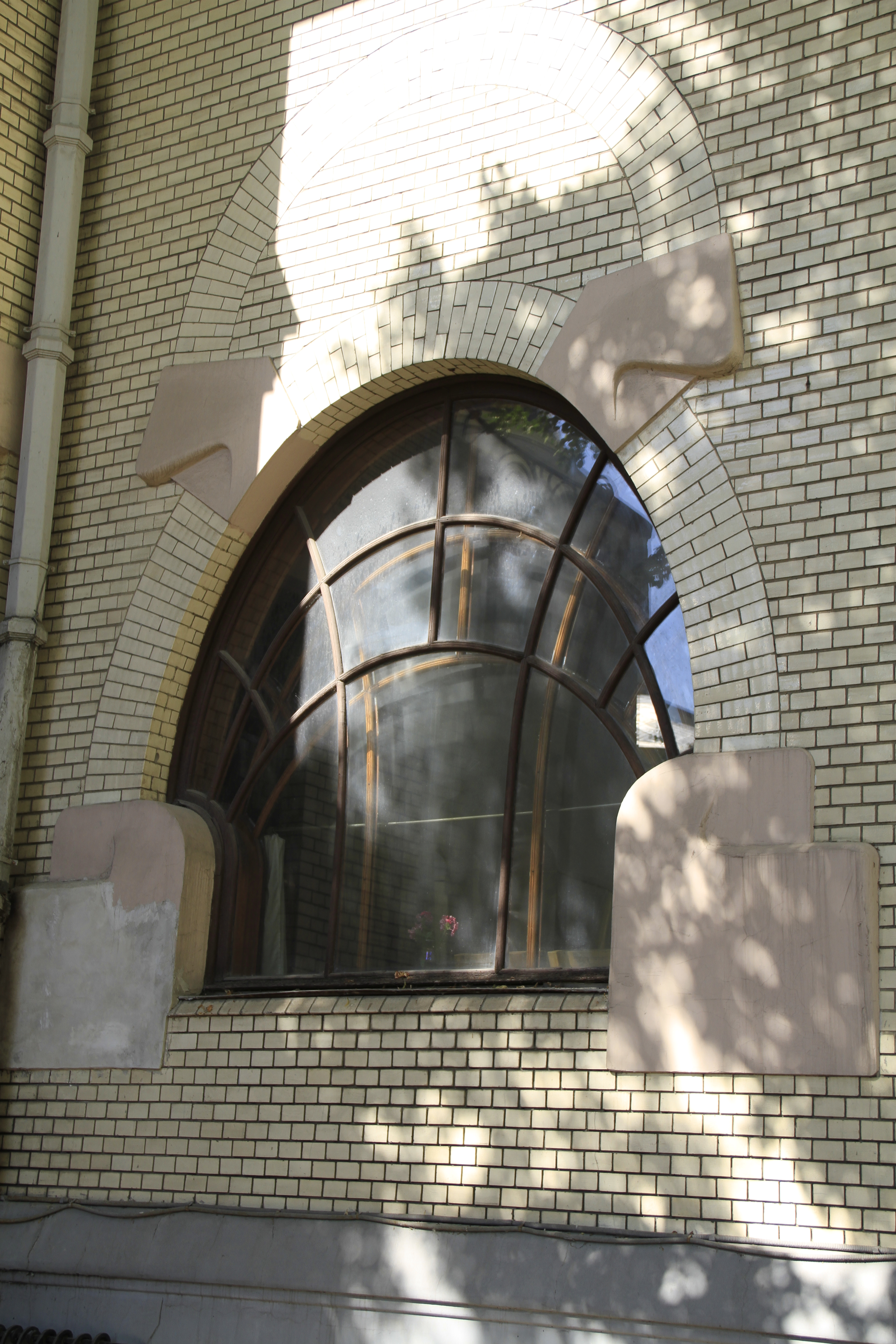
Window on the south facade

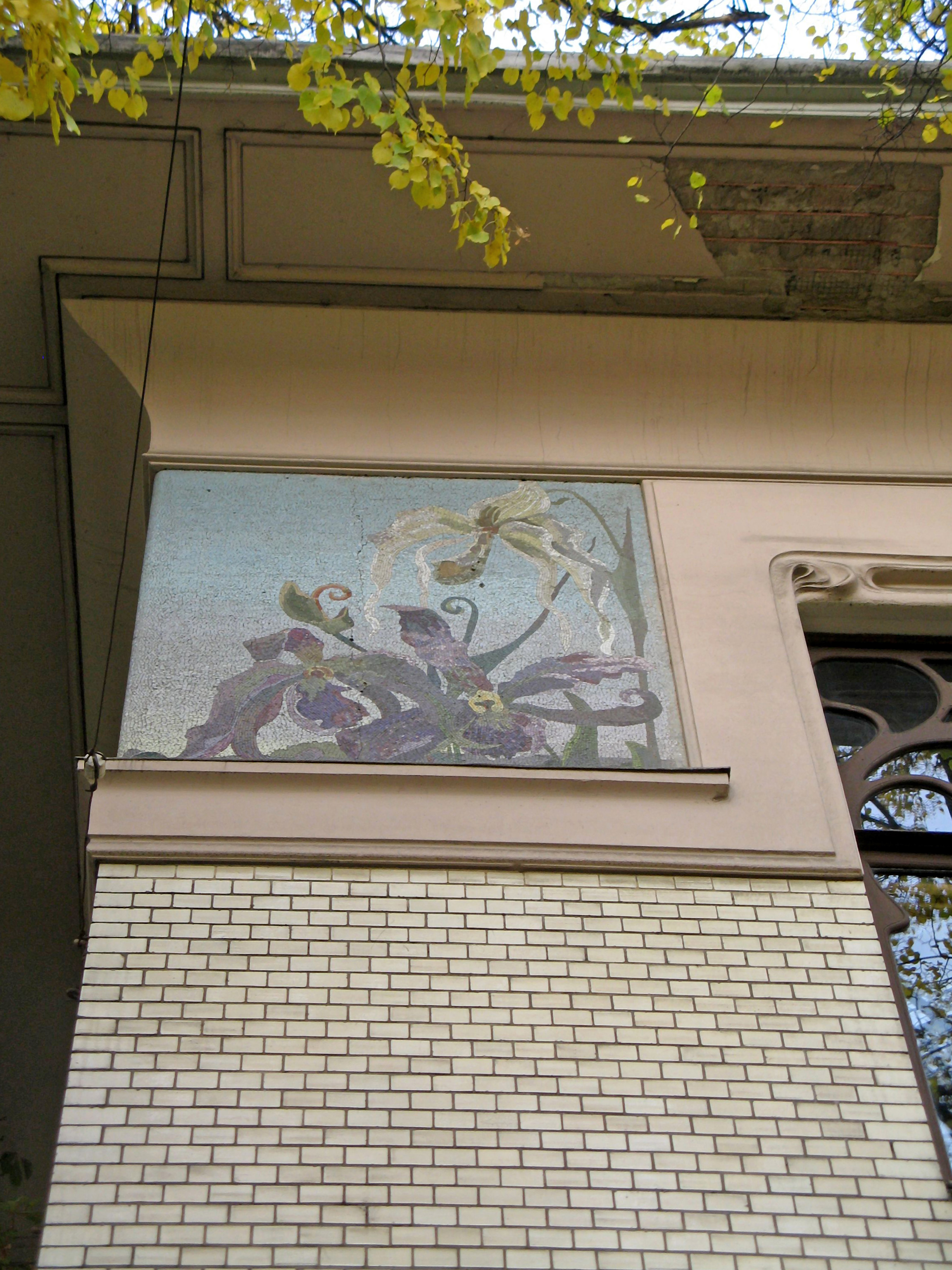
Facade mosaics of Iris flowers against blue sky

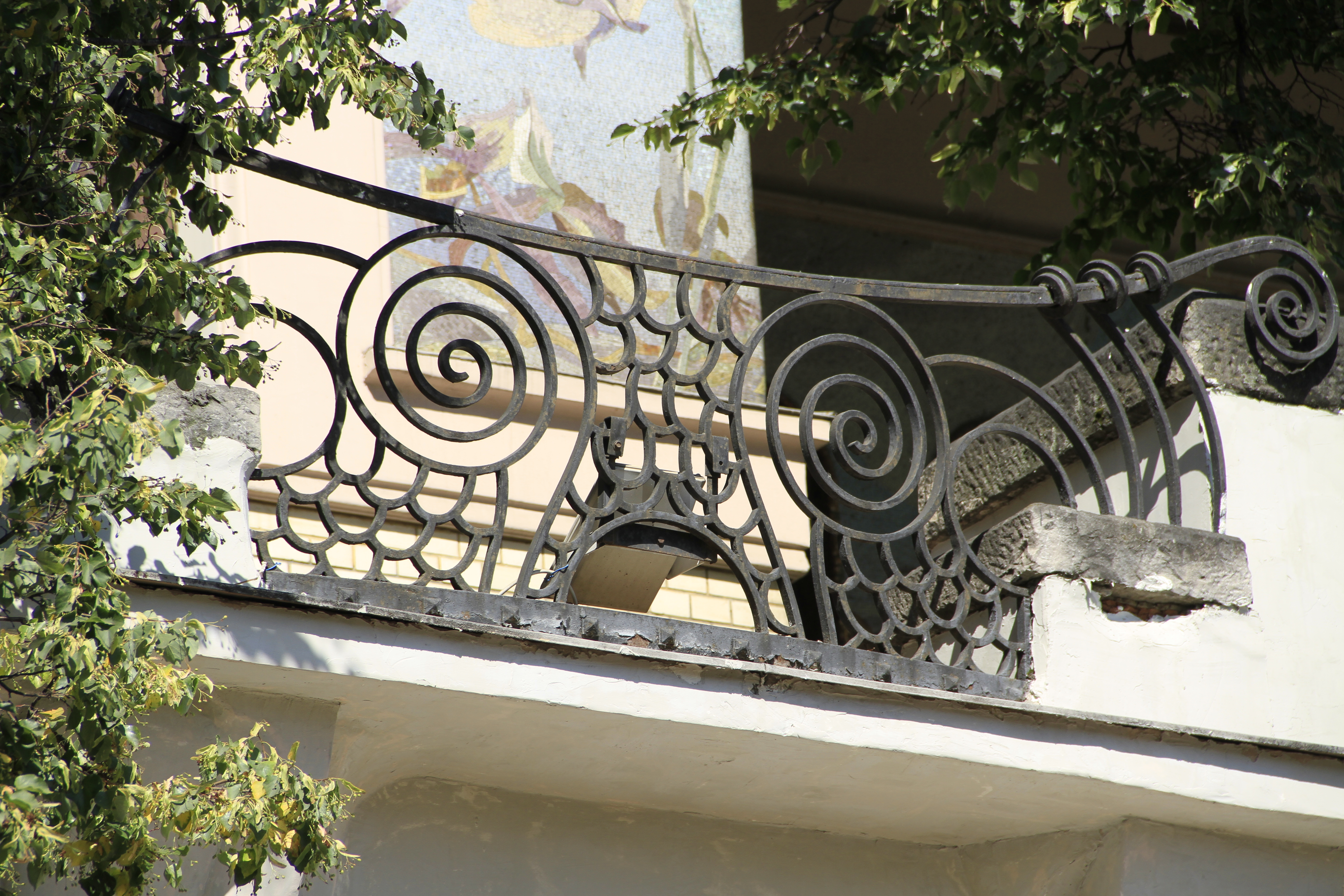
Balcony decoration on south facade

=== Interior - Entrance hall, Stairway and the Medusa Lamp ===
The plan of the interior was organized around a central element; the three-story staircase. The major rooms of the house all open onto the stairway. Its main feature is the highly sculptural stairway the railing of which is made of an aggregate of cast concrete mixed with marble and granite fragments, highly polished. The smooth, curling forms suggest waves of the sea. The glass and brass lamp at the base of the staircase is pure Art Nouveau. It takes the form of a medusa or jellyfish, and seems to float above the staircase. A red marble column emphasises the verticality of the staircase. It rises to the top of the house to the central skylight. Its capital is decorated with sculpted snakes and other reptiles.

The stairway is lit by both natural light from above, and through three vertical panels of stained glass that rise with the height of the building. The lighting effect on the ground floor is that of being at the bottom of the sea, an effect emphasized by the Medusa lamp, and the filtered light coming from above. The setting is highly theatrical; the sea-bottom effect had been introduced in Moscow in 1896 in the stage design for the opera Sadko by Nikolai Rimsky-Korsakov in a scene in which the hero descends to the bottom of the sea, to the realm of the Sea King, and returns to the surface with enormous wealth.

The entry hallway from the front door to the stairway of the house also picks up the motif of waves, both in the brass door handles and in the ceramic floor.

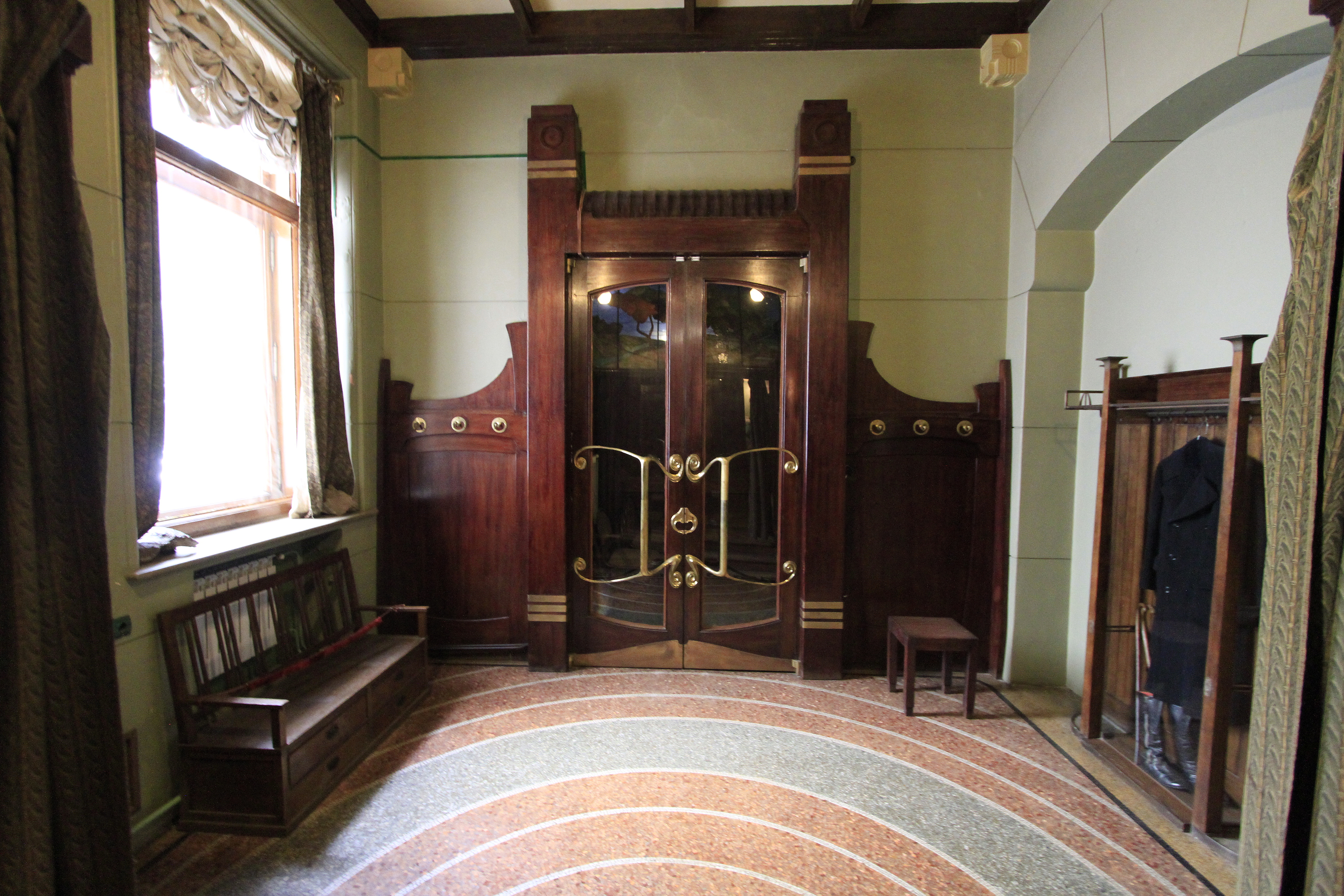
The entrance hall with wave pattern ceramic floor

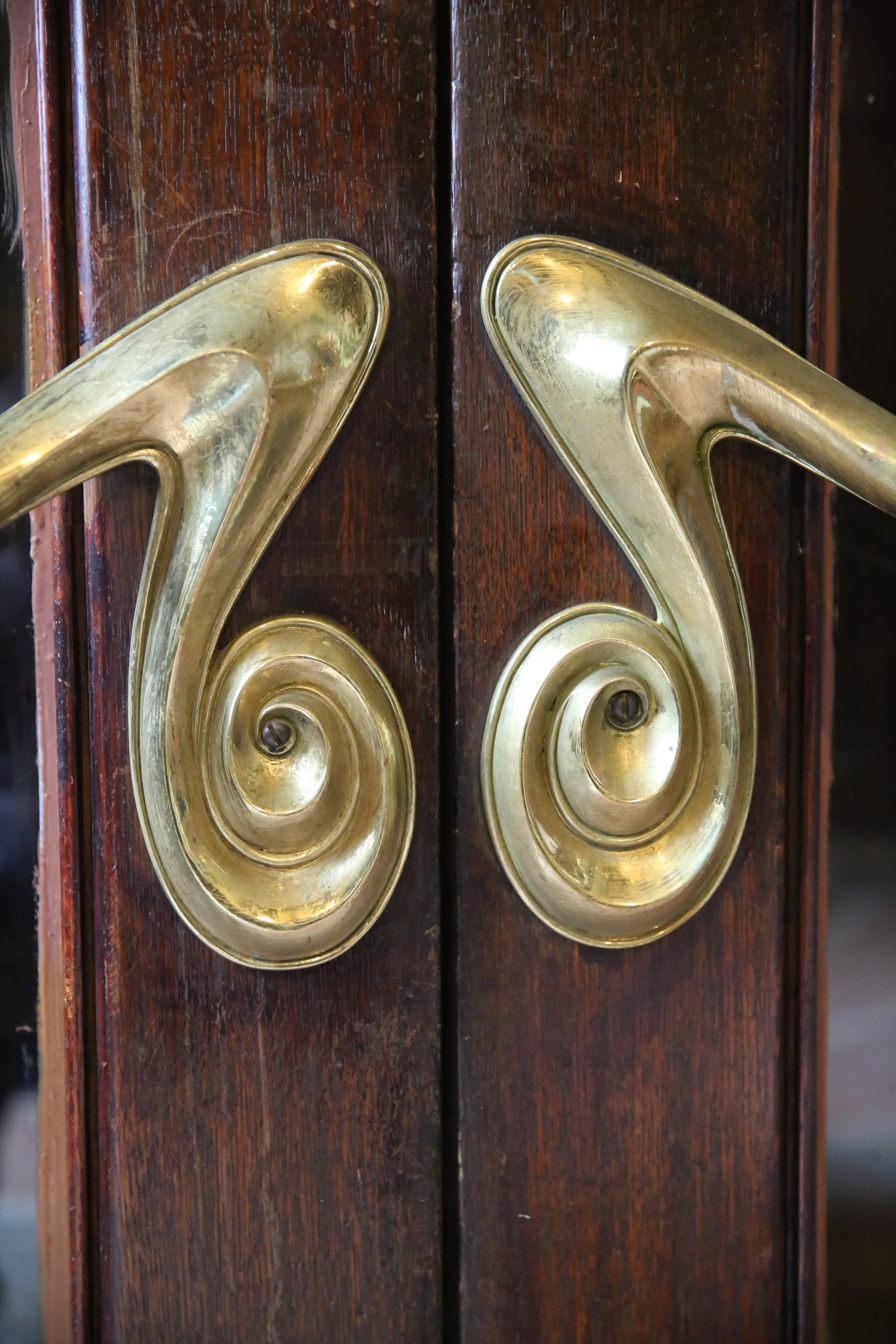
Detail of the front door handles

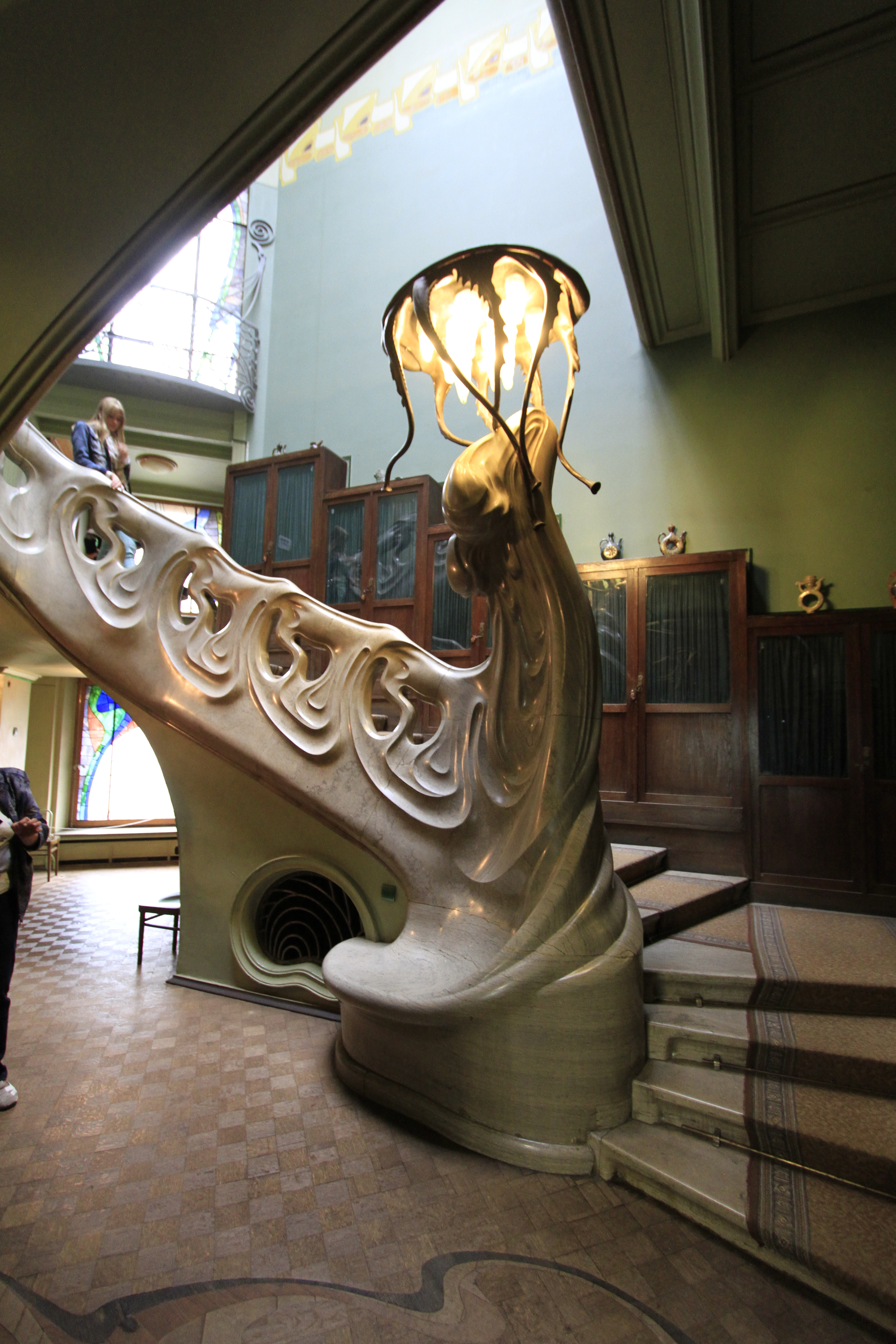
The stairway and the Medusa lamp

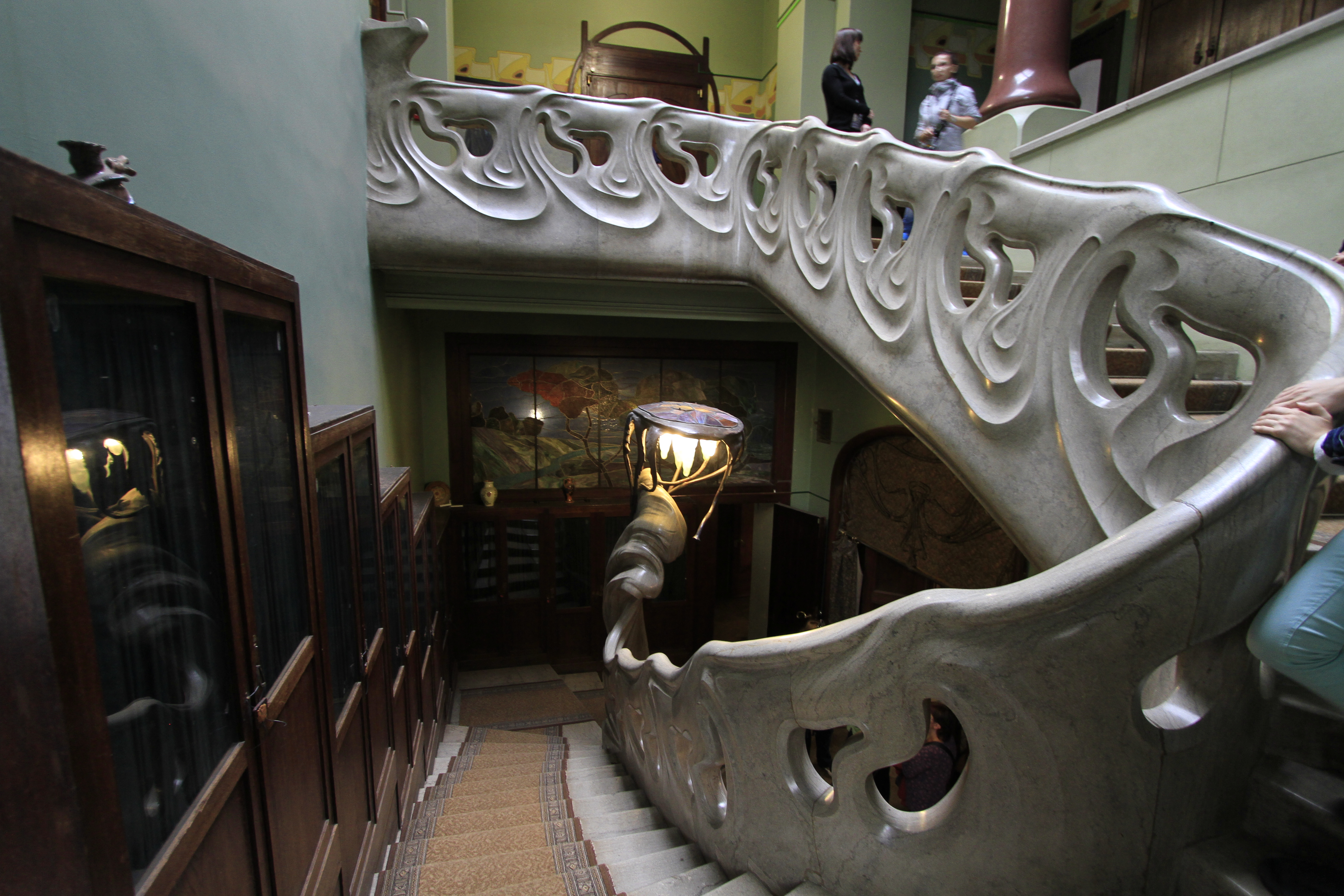
Full view of the stairway and Medusa lamp

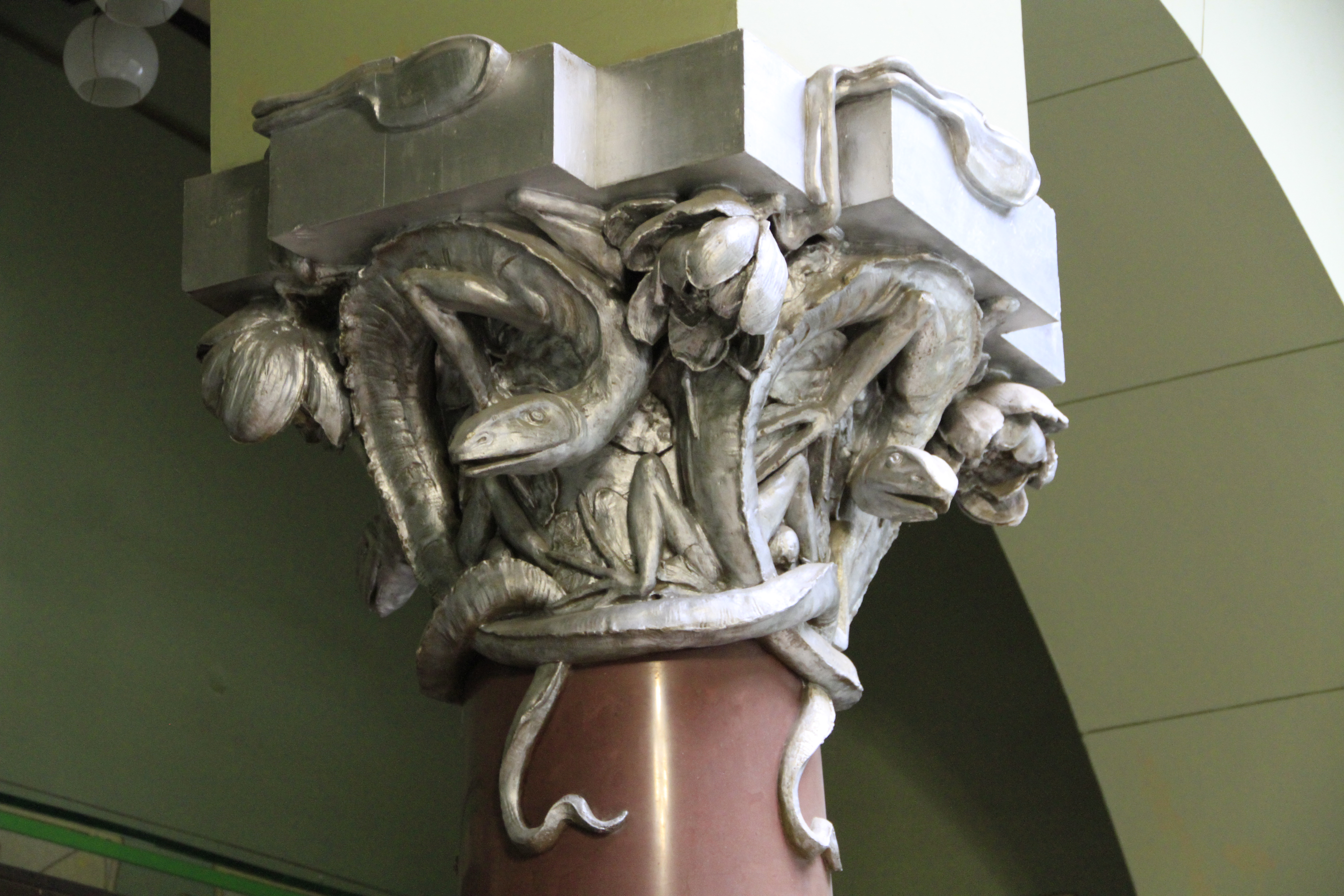
Sculpted column capital with snakes and reptiles at the top of the stairway

=== Dining Room ===
The dining room on the ground floor is one of the largest rooms. It opens onto the central stairway, and also has a separate door to the garden. It featured oak wainscoting and simple furniture, but the ceiling had plaster curving designs complemented by curving iron decoration around the large window. The original centrepiece of the room was a carved white mantle with an image of a large dragonfly, which disappeared after the Revolution.

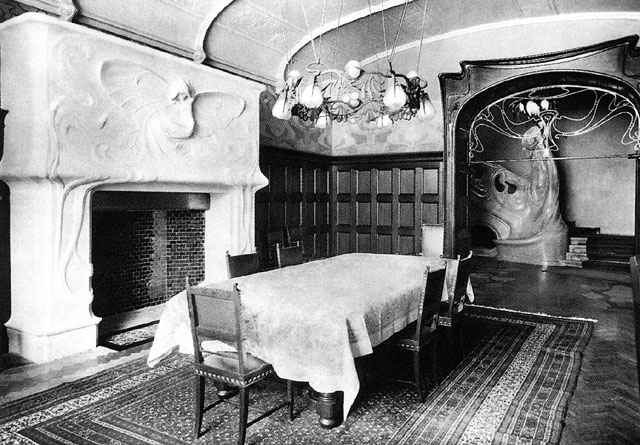
The dining room in the early 1900s

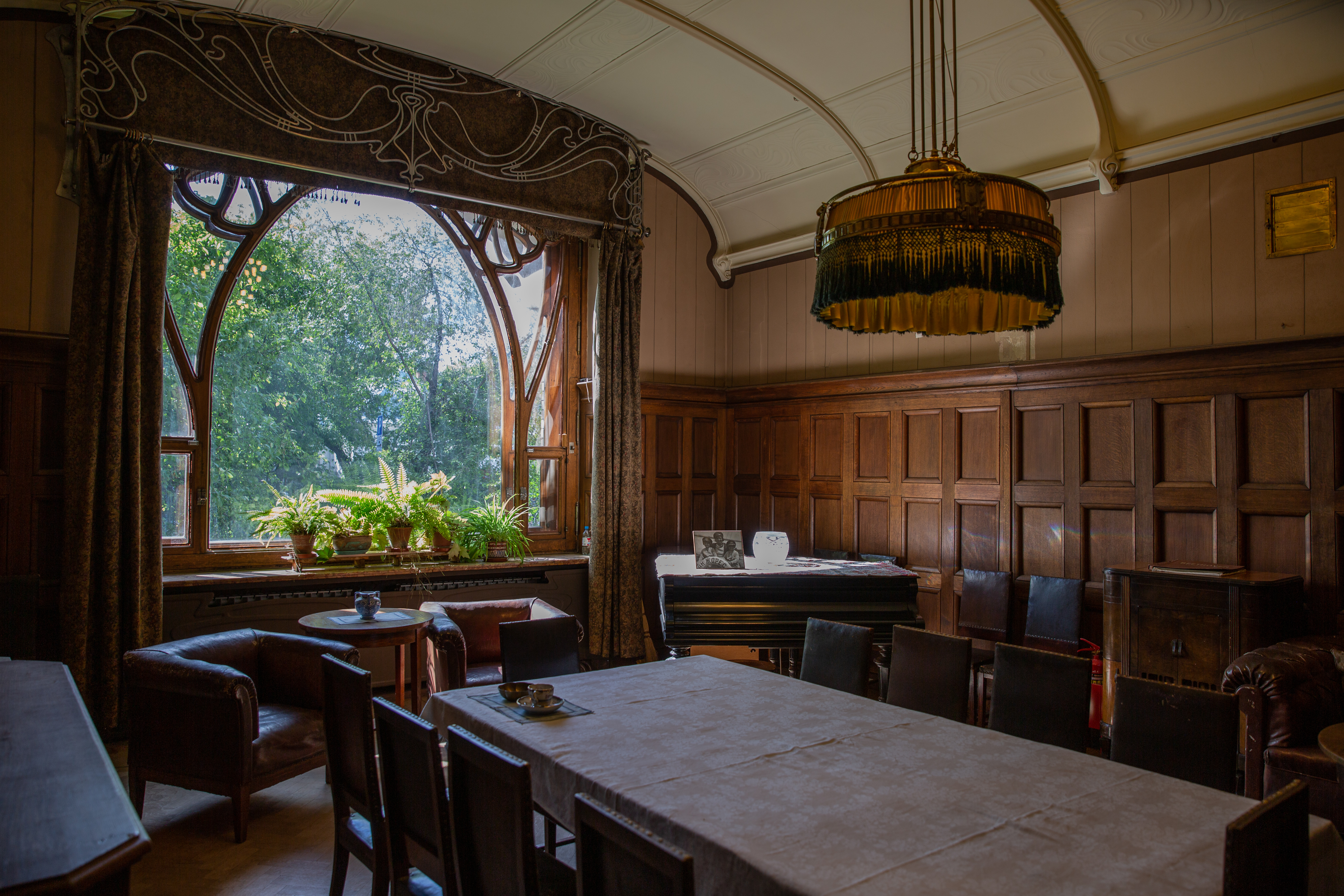
The dining room today

=== Gostinanya or reception room ===
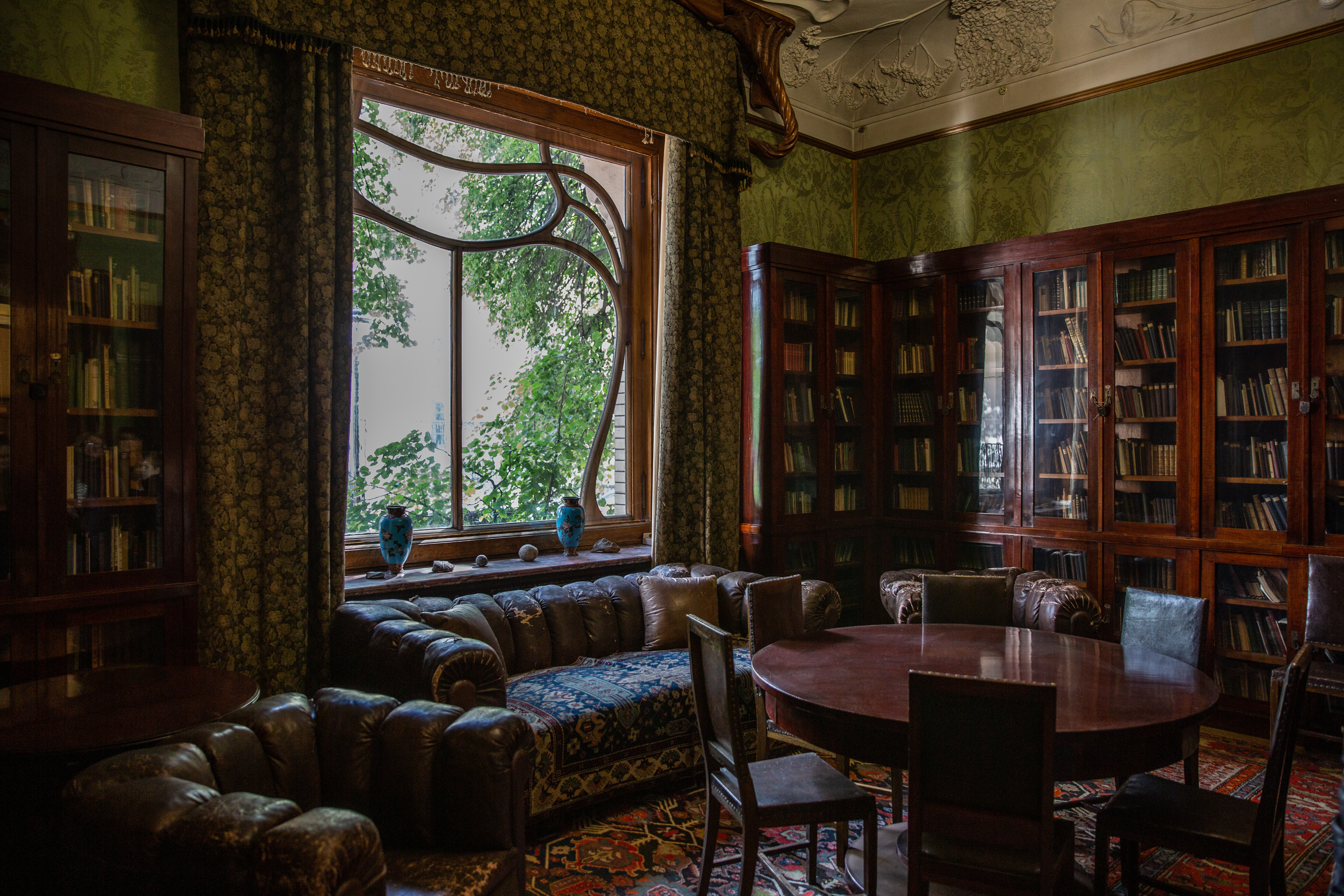
Gostinanya or reception room

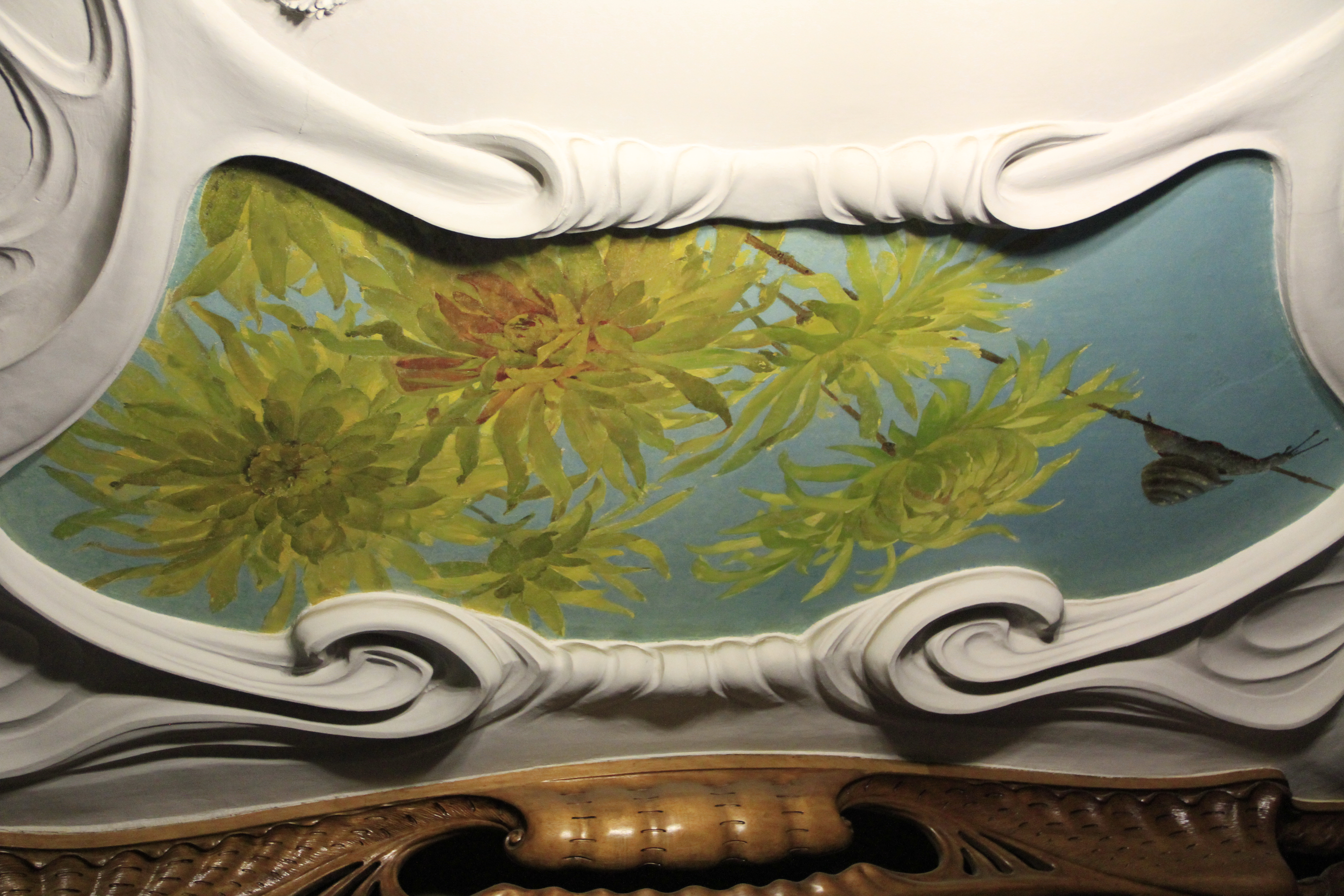
Ceiling image of flowers and a snail against the sky

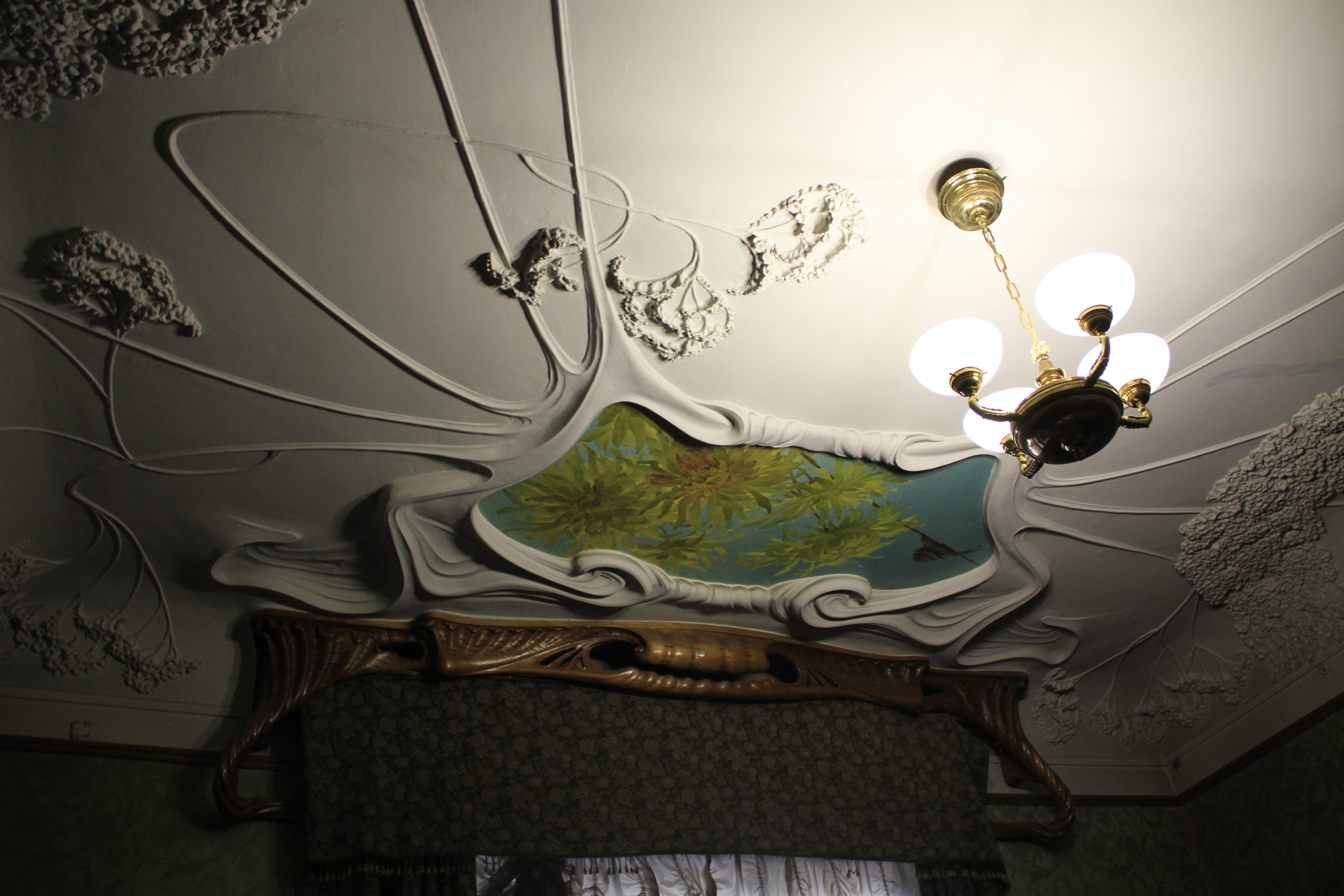
Ceiling resembling a pond surface. (Lamp is a later addition)

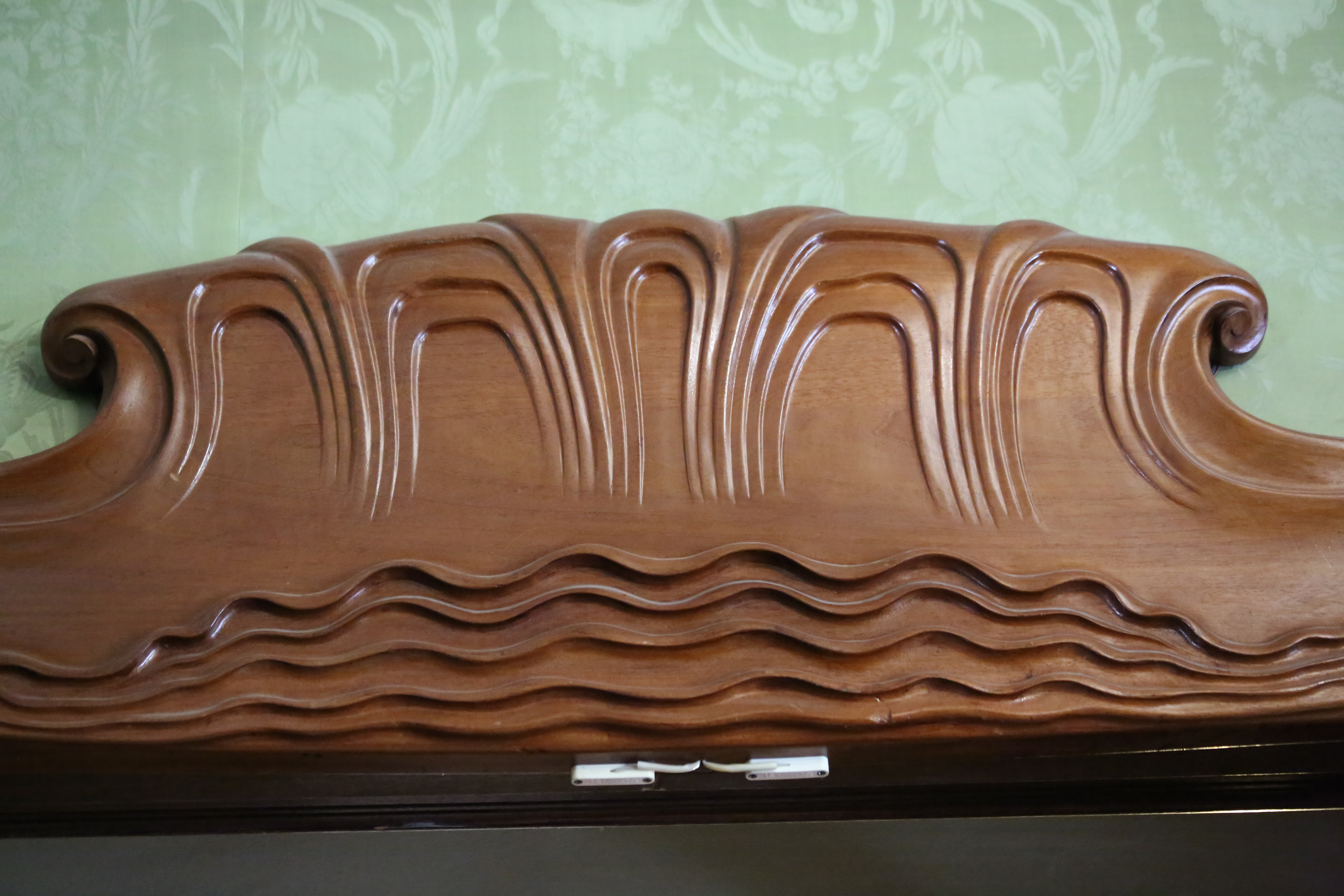
Carved Wave pattern over doorway

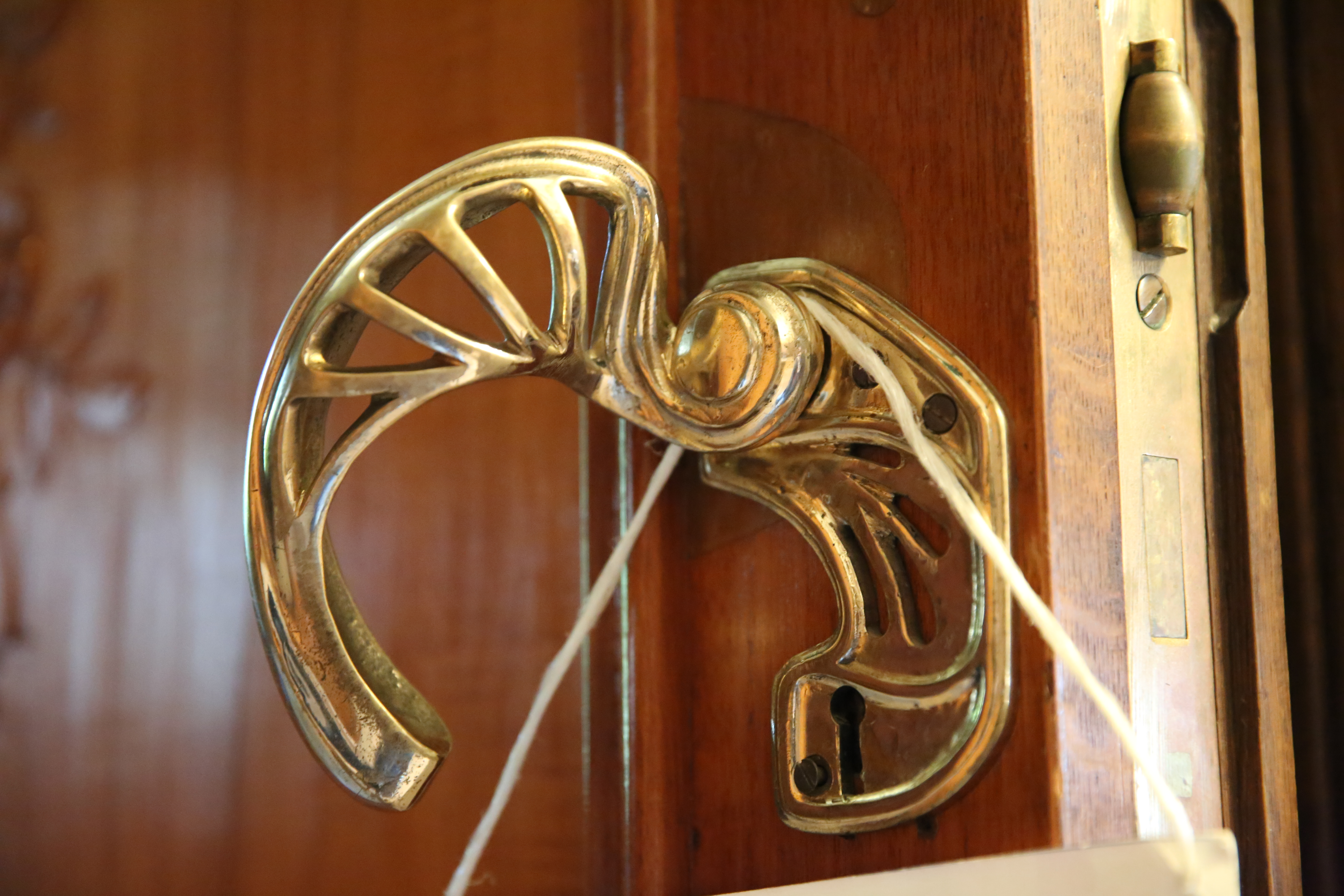
Door handles in the Gostinaya

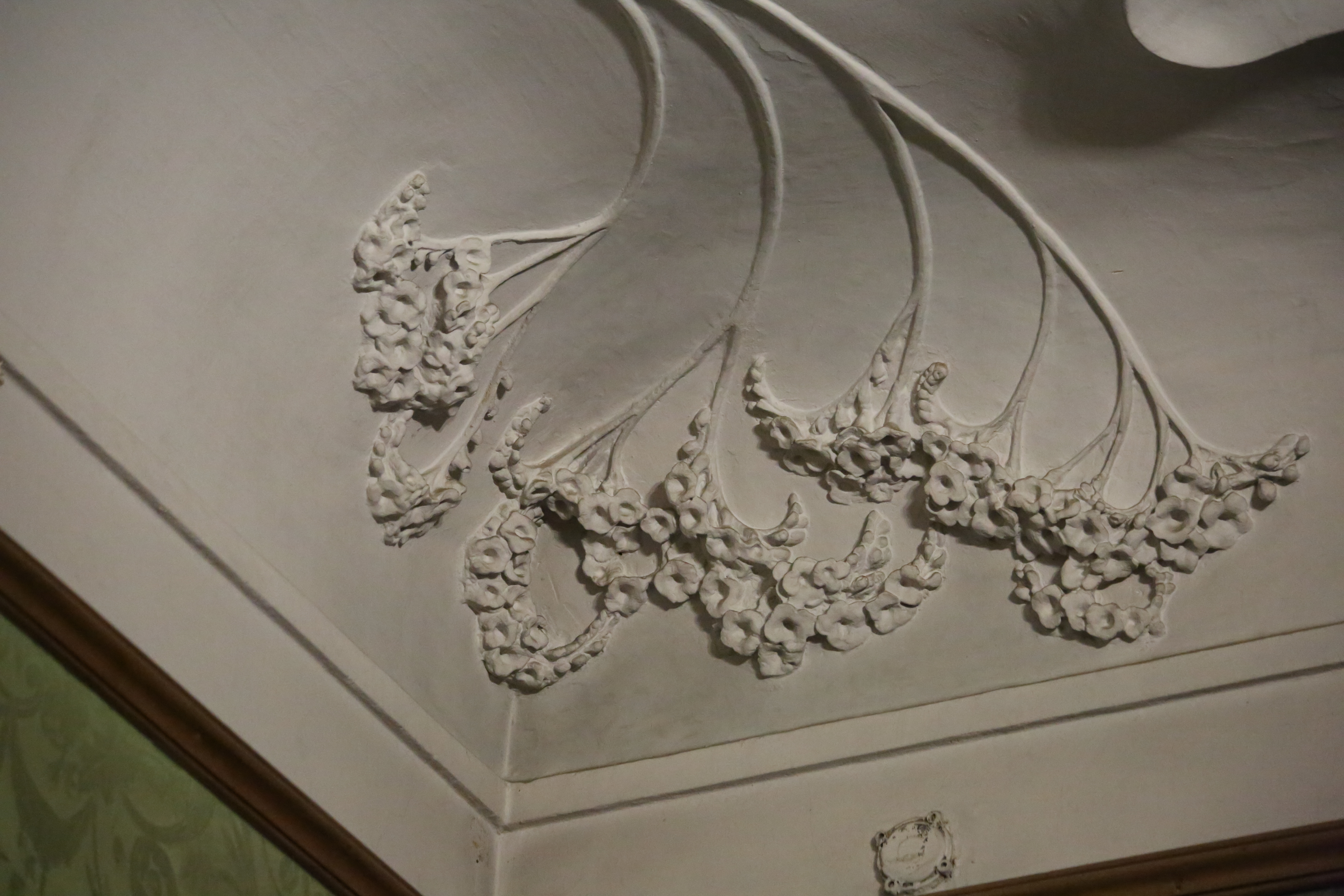
Ceiling decoration in the Gostinaya

=== Cabinet ===
The cabinet, or library, was decorated with special attention and contained cases with books and various collections. The furniture objects date to the 1930s, to the period of residence of Maxim Gorky, but the distinctive decorative elements on the walls and ceiling remain.

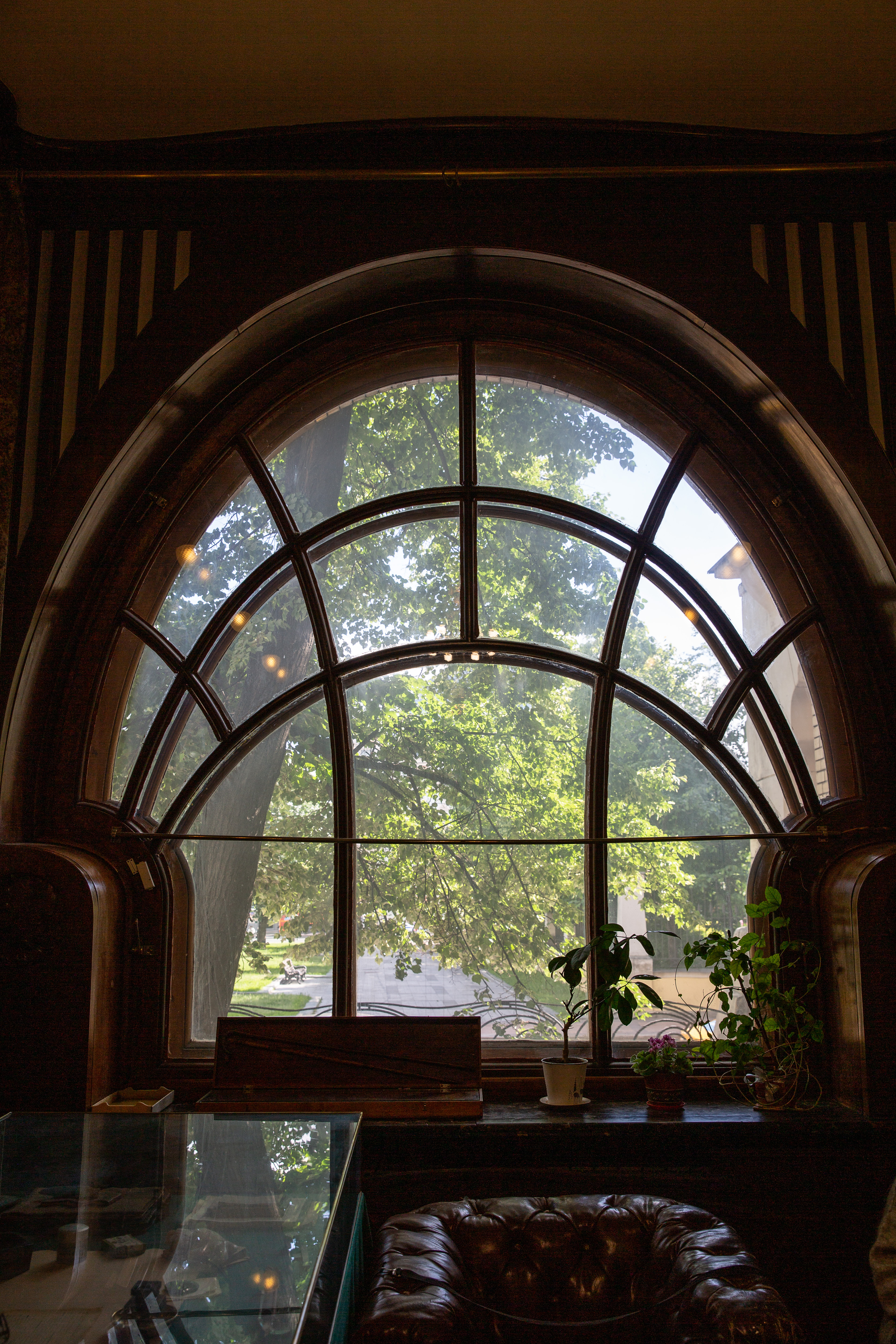
Window of the cabinet

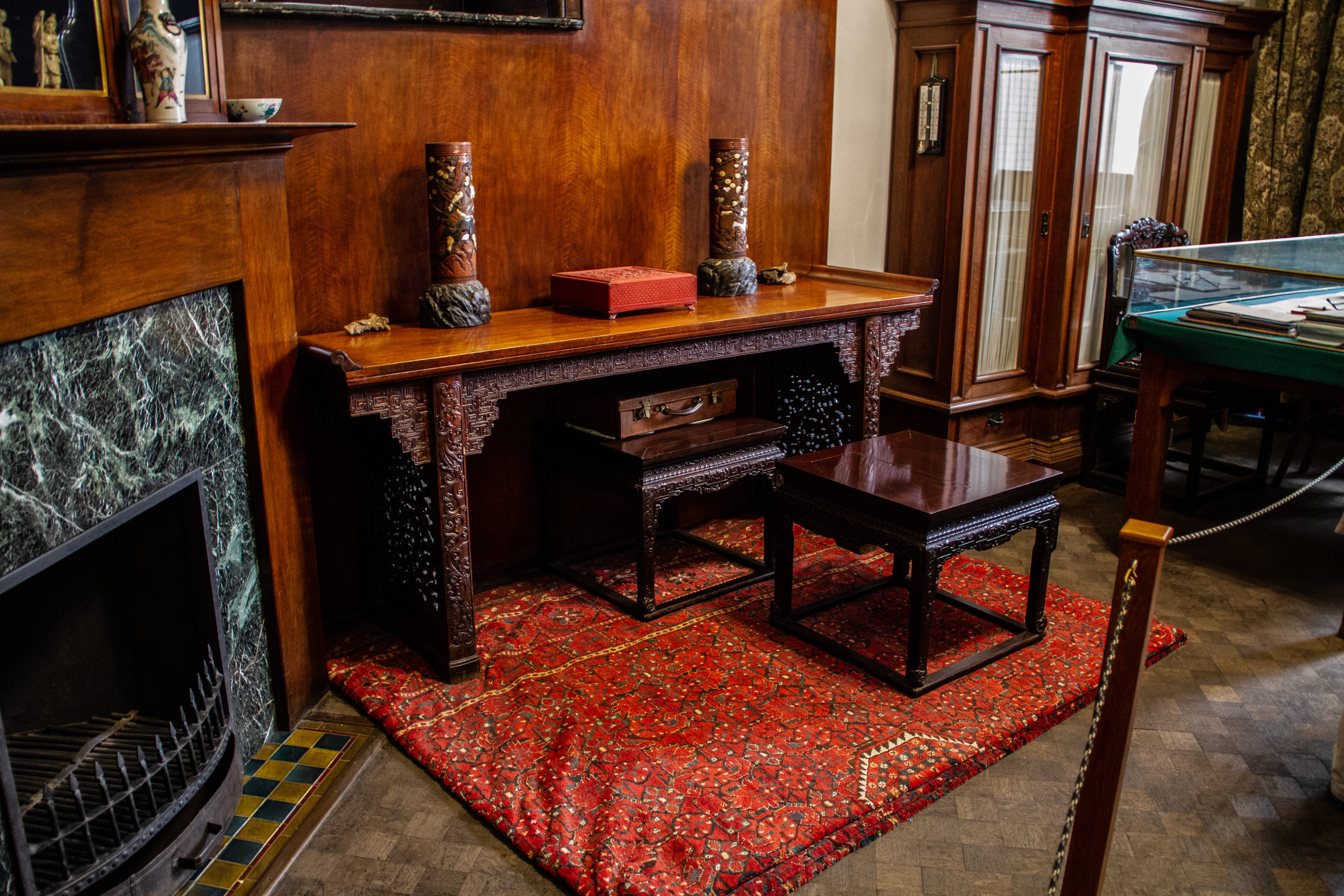
Desk and collections of the cabinet

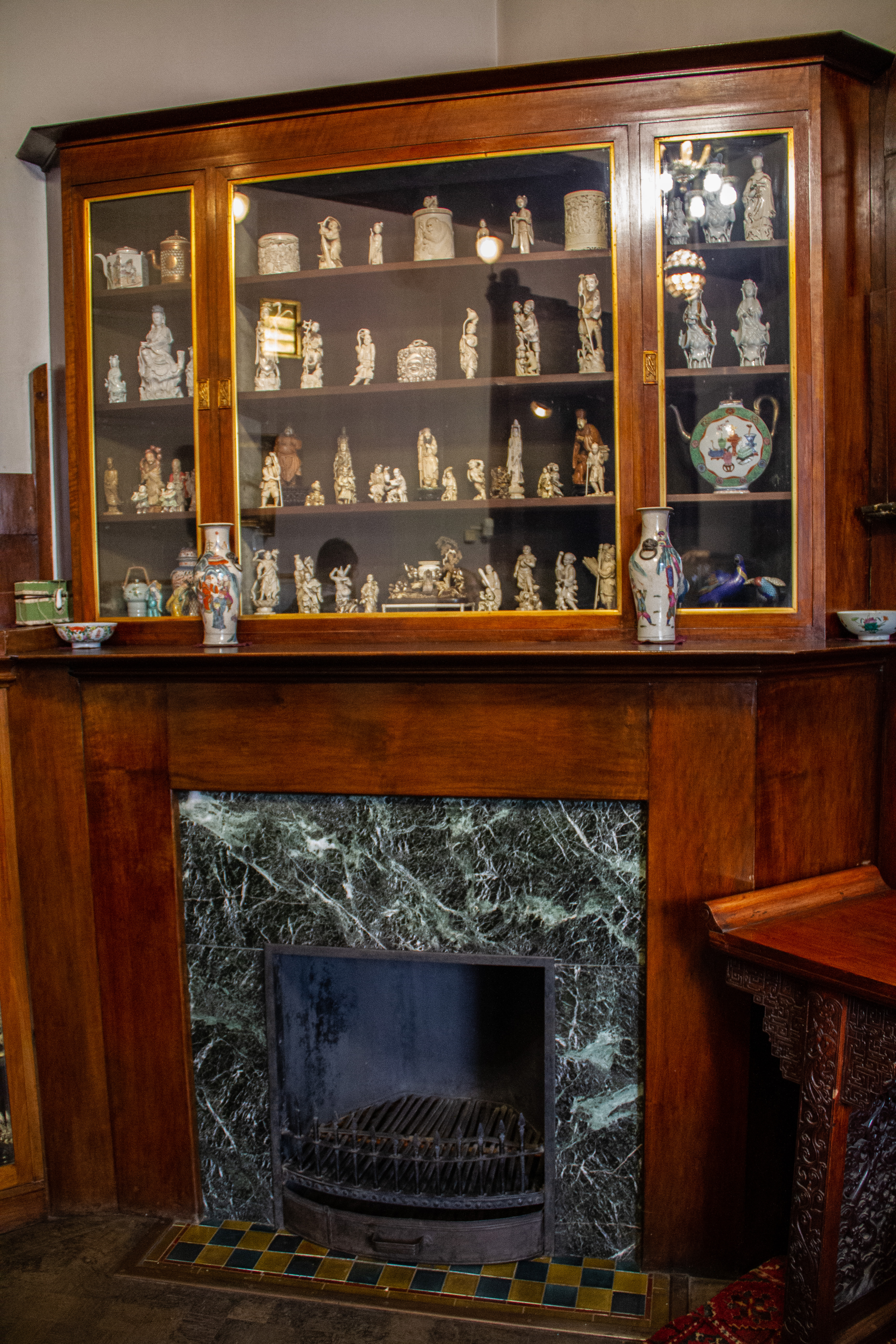
Displays of art objects in the cabinet, dating from 1930s

=== Chapel ===
The Ryabouchinsky family were members of the Old Believers sect of the Russian Orthodox Church, whose beliefs were condemned by the state-sponsored Russian church, so the chapel on the upper floor was very discreet and simple, with a cupola and windows facing north. It was decorated in a combination of Russian Revival and Moderne ornament.

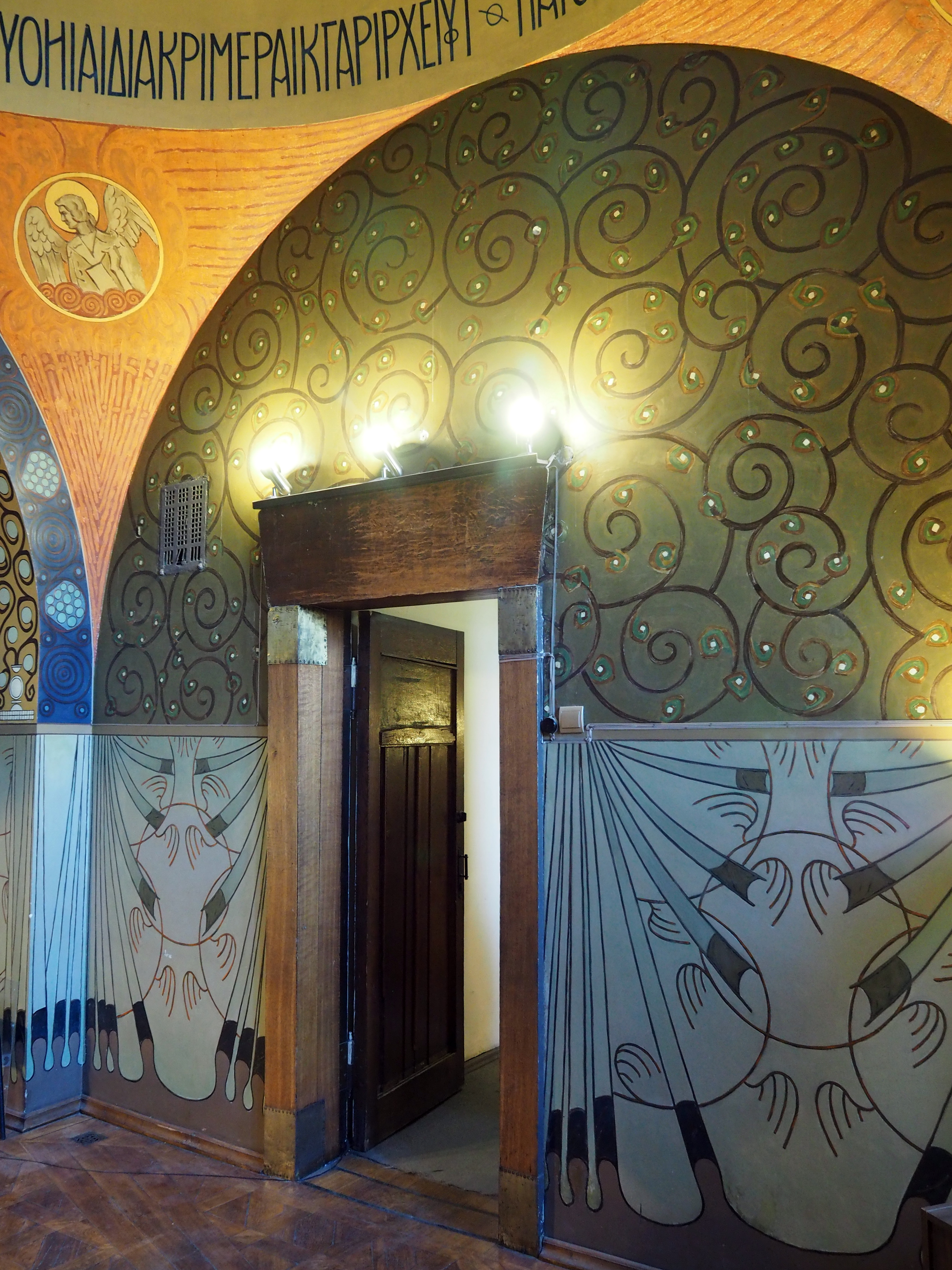
The secret Old Believer's Chapel

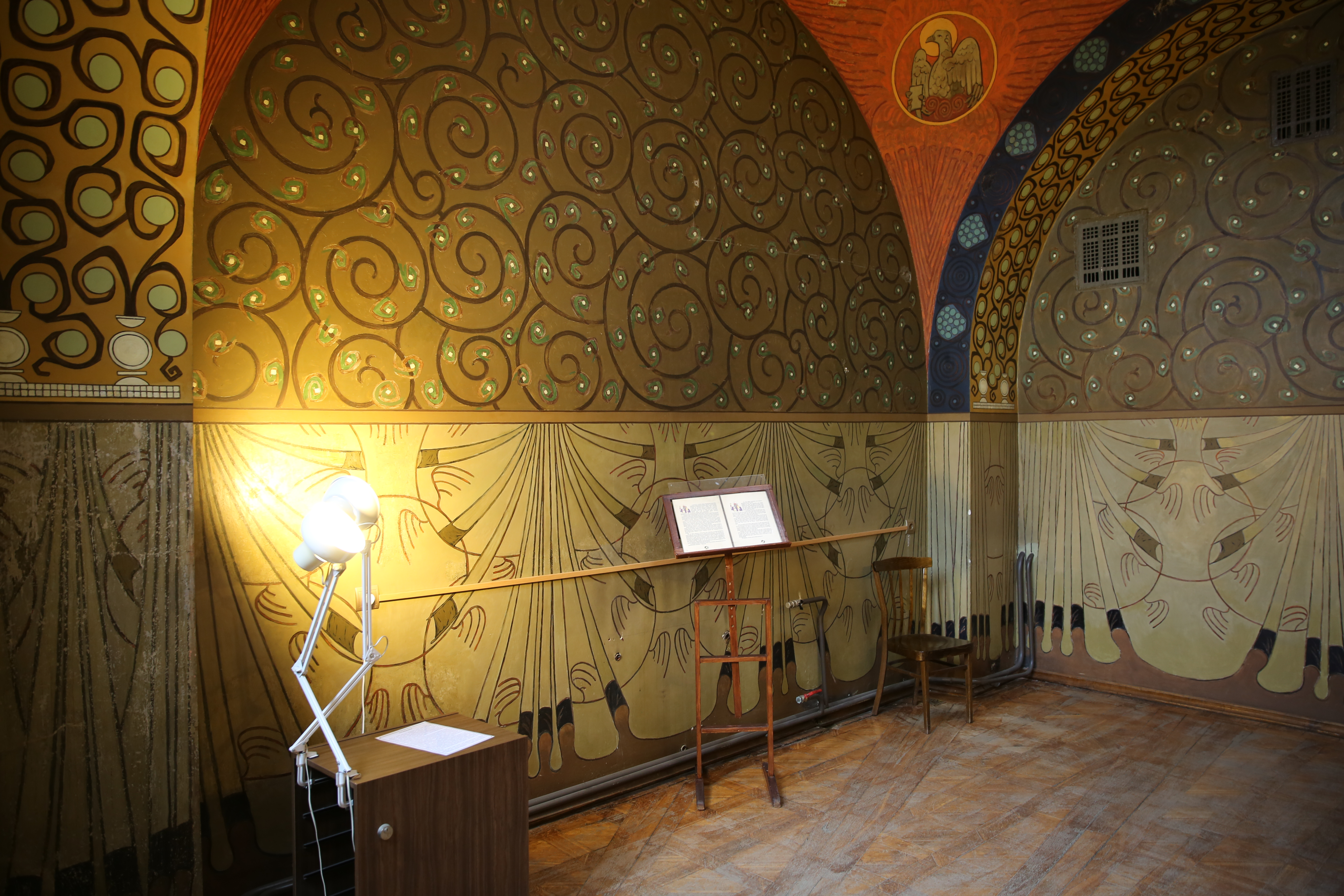
Old Believers' Chapel

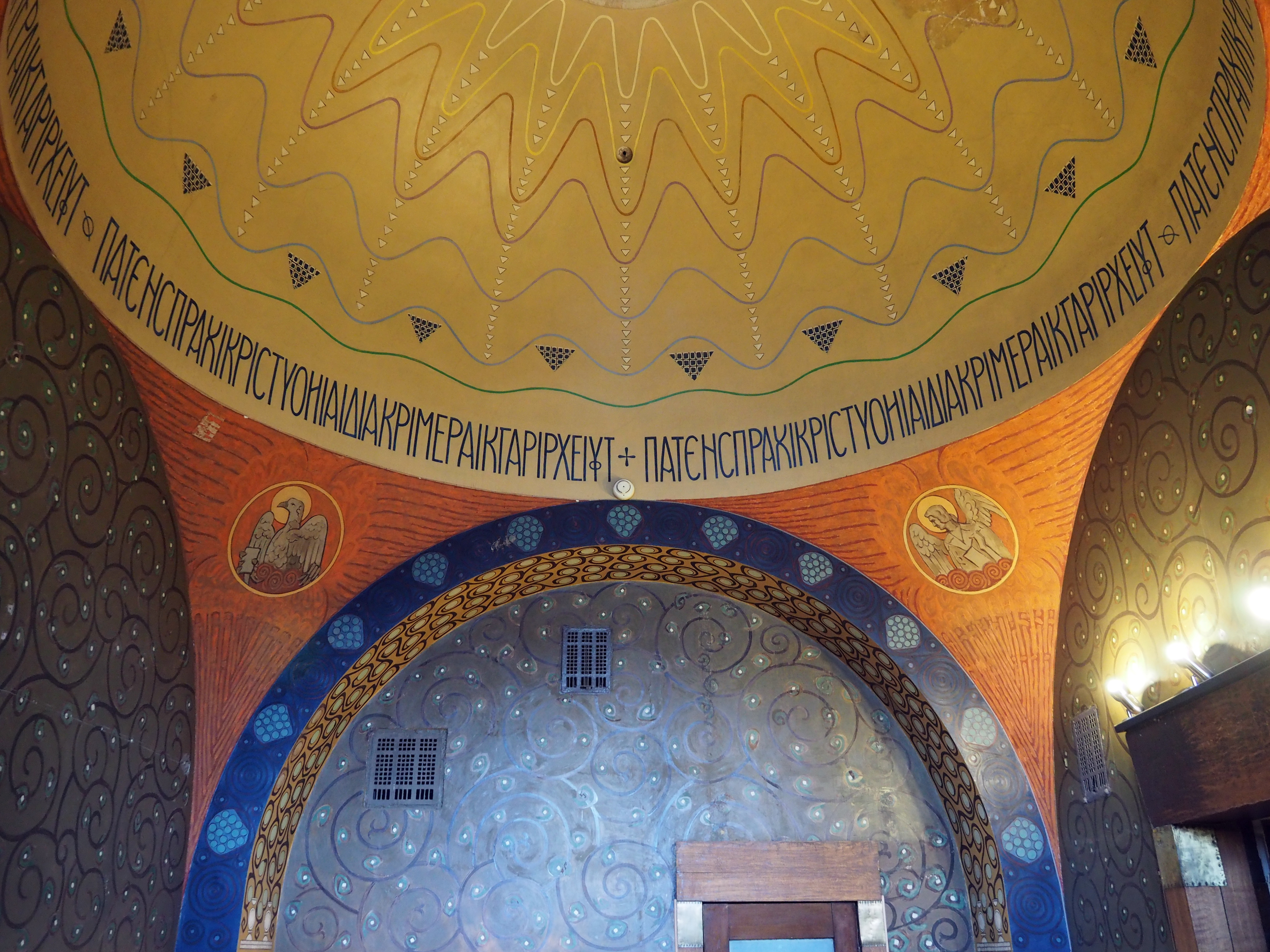
Dome of the chapel

=== Stained glass ===
There are Moderne style stained glass windows in the dining room and the cabinet or study, Schechtel designed the windows and had them made by craftsmen.

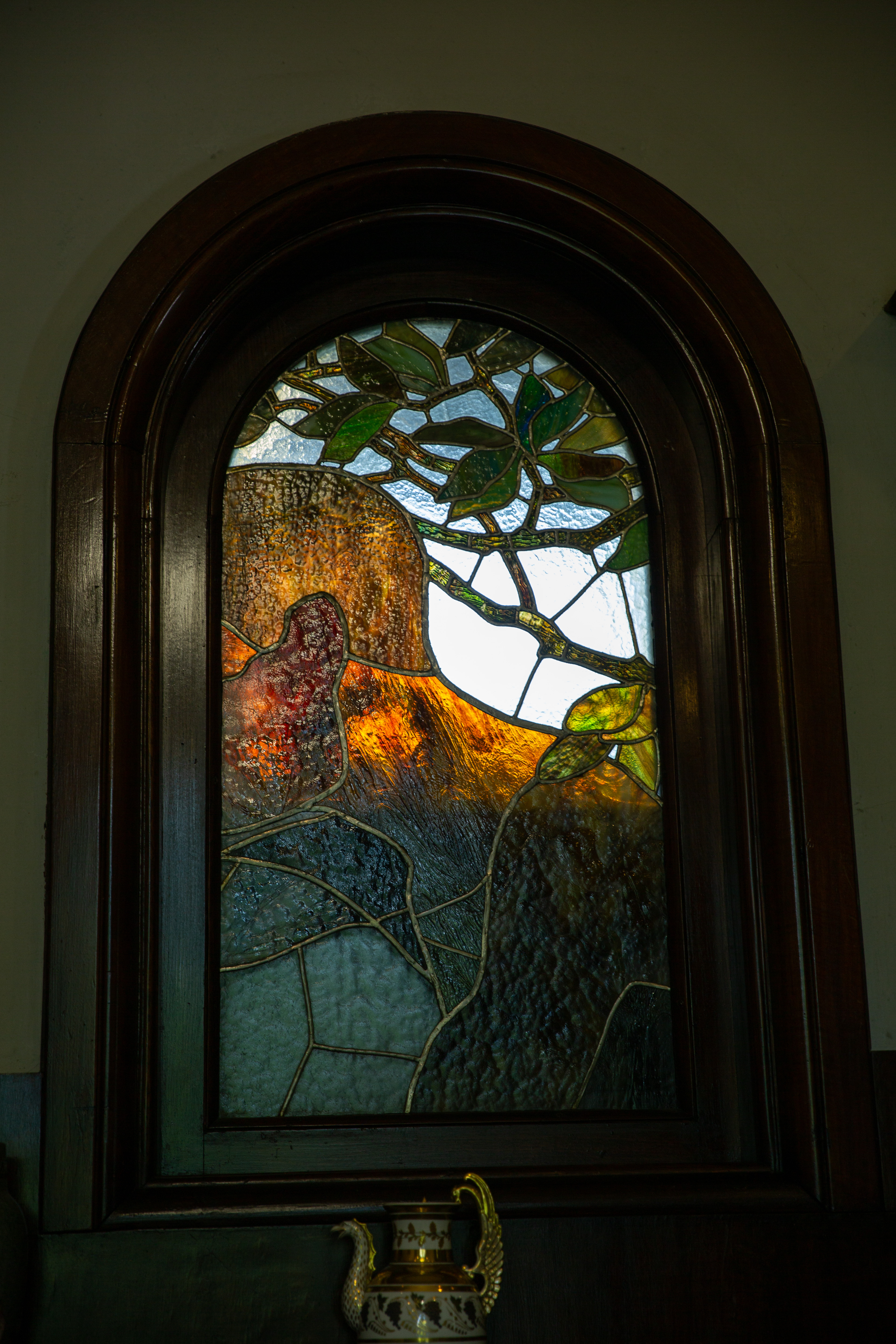
window in the cabinet, or study

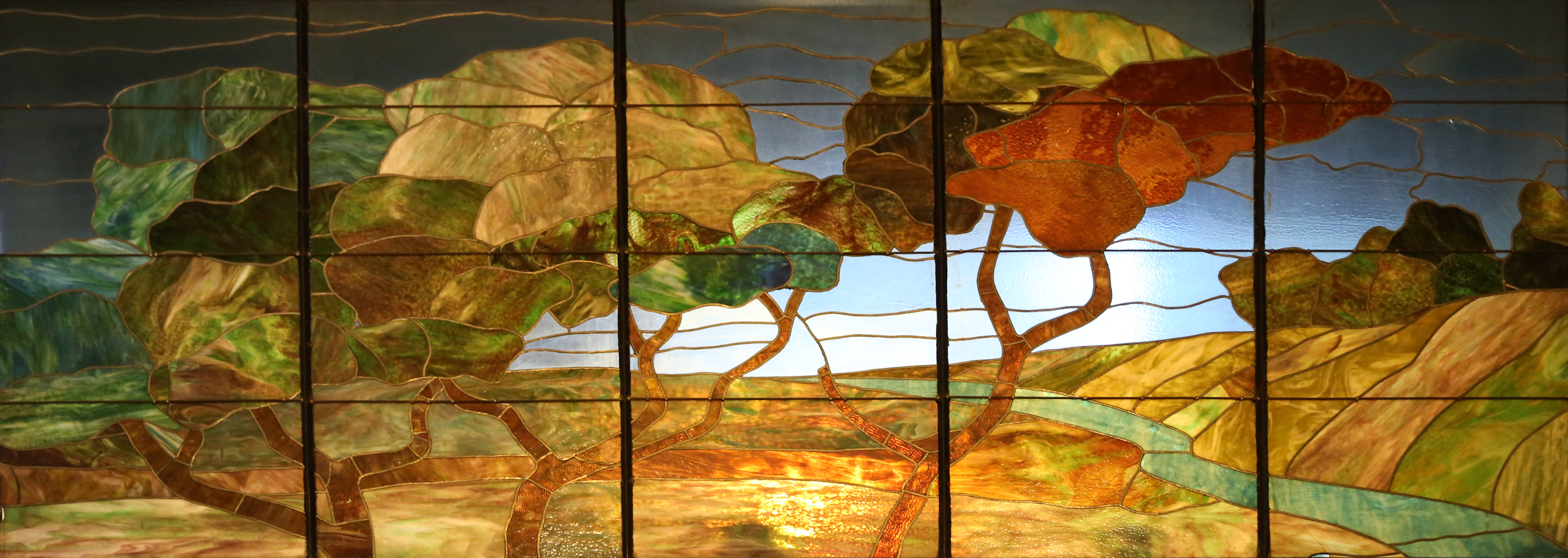
Stained glass in the entry hall

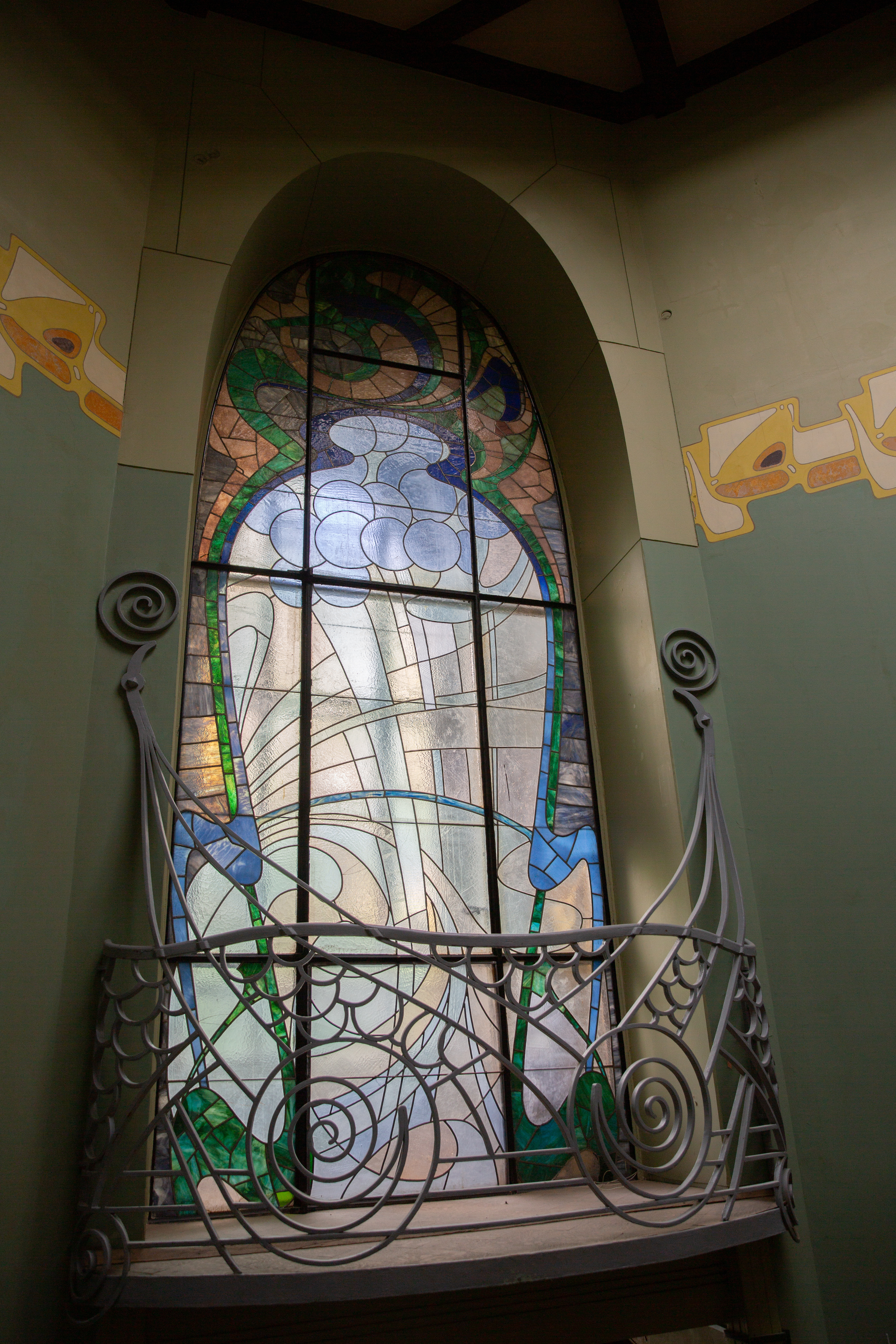
Window on the main staircase

== Museum ==
The museum houses the important Gorky library and guest book. The interior of the writer's private apartments reflects the decorative taste of the 1930s, when Gorky lived there, since most of the Art Nouveau furniture of the Ryabouchinsky family had disappeared in the revolutionary turmoil.

Today the entrance is through the old service entrance. Gorky lived on the ground floor, while his son and his family lived on the first floor.

== Bibliography ==
- Brumfield, William Craft (1991). "Chapter Four – Fedor Shekhtel: Aesthetic Idealism in Modernist Architecture". The Origins of Modernism in Russian Architecture. Berkeley: University of California Press. ISBN 0-520-06929-3.
- Fahr-Becker, Gabriele (2015). L'Art Nouveau (in French). H.F. Ullmann. ISBN 978-3-8480-0857-5.
