= Jamil Ahmed Khan (diplomat) =

Former Pakistani Ambassador to the UAE

Pakistan Ambassador to the United Arab Emirates
- Succeeded by: Asif Durrani

Jamil Ahmed Khan was the Ambassador of Pakistan to the United Arab Emirates from November 2010 to June 2013. Previously, he was the Pakistan Ambassador to Libya from April 2009 to November 2010. A former captain in the Pakistan Army, Khan holds a Bachelors in Economics and Political Science from the Government College University, Lahore; a Masters in History from the University of the Punjab, Lahore; a postgraduate diploma in diplomacy from the Institut International d’Administration Publique, Paris; and a Bachelors in International Relations from the University of London. As a diplomat, he has also held positions in the United Nations and as the Head of Country in East Timor, Yemen, Somalia and Botswana.

Diplomatic posts
Preceded by	Ambassador of Pakistan to the United Arab Emirates; 2010–2013	Succeeded by Asif Durrani
