= Dear... (song) =

"Dear…"

Single by May J.

from the album Baby Girl
- B-side: "Love Blossom"
- Released: May 30, 2007
- Genre: J-urban
- Label: Ki/oon, Neosite Discs

May J. singles chronology
"Here We Go" (2006)	"Dear…" (2007)	"Do tha' Do tha" (2007)

"Dear…" is May J.'s second solo single, released on May 30, 2007. The A-side is described as a high quality ballad full of bitter-sweet sadness. The song was produced by Ryoji of Ketsumeishi. The single includes a remix of the previous single, "Here We Go", in the same way that "Here We Go" contained a remix of "My Girls". This is May J.'s lowest charting release, singles and albums included.

== Track listing ==
1. "Dear..."
2. "Love Blossom"
3. "Here We Go (Buzzer Beats Remix)" (featuring Verbal & Taro Soul)
4. "Dear... (TV Mix)"

== Charts ==
Oricon Sales Chart (Japan)

Release	Chart	Peak position	Chart run
May 30, 2007	Oricon Weekly Singles Chart	97	2 weeks
