= Jamileh =

- Gender: Female

Origin
- Origin: Persian
- Meaning: Beautiful

Other names
- Related names: Jamila

Jamileh (Persian: جمیله) is a female given name. It means "beautiful". Notable people with the given name include:

== People ==
- Jamileh Esfahani, Iranian poet in the 16th and 17th centuries
- Jamileh (born 1946), Iranian dancer
- Jamileh Alamolhoda (born 1965), Iranian writer and scholar
- Jamileh Kadivar (born 1963), Iranian politician
- Jamileh Sadeghi (born 1958), Iranian businesswoman
- Jamileh Sheykhi (1930–2001), Iranian actress
- Jamileh Sorouri (born 1950), Iranian gymnast
- May J. (born 1988), Japanese singer

== See also ==
- Jamila
- Jamill
