= Pirate Corps =

Pirate Corps may refer to:

- Pirate Corps, a fictional entity in Gundam Reconguista in G
- Pirate Corp$, a comic book by Evan Dorkin, later retitled Hectic Planet
