= List of Gundam Reconguista in G episodes =

Cover of the first DVD volume by Bandai Visual.

Gundam Reconguista in G is a 2014 Japanese science fiction anime television series and the thirteenth incarnation of Sunrise's long-running Gundam mecha metaseries. It was written and directed by Yoshiyuki Tomino and features character designs by Kenichi Yoshida. It aired from October 2, 2014, to March 26, 2015, on in the MBS/TBS networks' Animeism block.

The first opening theme is "BLAZING" by Garnidelia, while the first ending theme is "G no Senkō" by Daisuke Hasegawa. The second opening theme is "Magic of Futari (ふたりのまほう)" by May J.

== Episodes ==
No.	Title	Original release date
1	"The Mysterious Mobile Suit"; Transliteration: "Nazo no Mobiru Sūtsu" (Japanese: 謎のモビルスーツ)	October 2, 2014
R.C. 1014: A mysterious mobile suit, G-Self, is being pursued by a group of space pirates and the Capital Guard. The suit is captured by the pirates and the pilot of the suit, Raraiya Monday, is captured by the Capital Guard. A week later, a class of Capital Guard Academy cadets are riding a Crown transport module up along the orbital elevator, Capital Tower, to reach space where they can conduct their first live mobile suit training. On the way up their Crown is attacked by space pirates and their mobile suits, one of which is the G-Self. Bellri Zenam, the youngest of the cadets, pilots a maintenance mobile suit to hold off the G-Self and helps capture the pirate suit as well as its pilot, Aida Surgan.
2	"G-Self, Start Up!"; Transliteration: "G-serufu kidō!" (Japanese: G-セルフ起動!)	October 2, 2014
Capital Territory is attacked by a squadron of space pirate mobile suits led by Cahill Saint, who wants to rescue the captured Aida. Bellri and his friend Noredo manage to rescue Aida as the structure she was being held in was damaged during the attack. Tasked with piloting the G-Self to repel the pirate attack, Bellri kills Cahill in an act of self-defense as Aida watches.
3	"The Pressure of Montero"; Transliteration: "Montēro no atsuryoku" (Japanese: モンテーロの圧力)	October 9, 2014
Piloting the Montero, space pirate ace pilot Klim Nick tries to once again assault Capital Territory in an attempt to rescue Aida from its clutches. As the battle breaks out, Bellri, Aida, Noredo, and Raraiya happened to be in G-Self's cockpit while testing their abilities to pilot the mobile suit. Aida succeeds in wrestling control of the G-Self from the others, who remain in the cockpit as she escapes from captivity with Klim.
4	"Wild Dance of the Catsith"; Transliteration: "Kattoshī ranbu" (Japanese: カットシー乱舞)	October 16, 2014
Klim and Aida return to the space pirates' mothership, the Megafauna, with the G-Self, along with Bellri, Noredo, and Raraiya, who are held hostage. Meanwhile, the Capital Army, the Capital Territory's new military, is officially unveiled to the public and its first mission is rescuing the hostages from the Megafauna. Bellri, wanting to protect Noredo and Raraiya, pilots the G-Self to put a stop to the fighting, but ends up being forced to defend himself from the Capital Army mobile suits and he successfully repels their attacks.
5	"The Enemy is the Capital Army"; Transliteration: "Teki wa Kyapitaru Āmyi" (Japanese: 敵はキャピタル・アーミィ)	October 23, 2014
The Capital Army unveils a new mobile suit, the Elf Bullock, piloted by the mysterious Mask who leads a team to once again attack the Megafauna. After having gained the trust of the Megafauna crew, Bellri promises Aida that he will protect the ship in order to make up for his killing of Cahill, and he once again helps fight off the attacking Capital Army mobile suits. However, Bellri and Noredo reveal that they are secretly spying on the pirates and have a plan to escape with the G-Self.
6	"Dellensen, A Fearsome Foe"; Transliteration: "Kyōteki, Derensen!" (Japanese: 強敵、デレンセン!)	October 30, 2014
The Megafauna launches into space in order to create a distraction for the assembling Amerian Space Fleet. Dellensen Samatar, Bellri's old instructor at the Capital Guards, pilots an Elf Bull to lead a squad of mobile suits to try to rescue Bellri. Unbeknownst to Dellensen, the G-Self is actually being piloted by Bellri, and the two engage in combat. The two eventually discover each others' identities, but it was too late as Bellri shoots Dellensen's Elf Bull down, killing his old instructor in the process.
7	"The Mask Corps's Fierce Assault"; Transliteration: "Masuku butai no kyōshū" (Japanese: マスク部隊の強襲)	November 6, 2014
Frustrated with the increasing power of the Capital Army, as well as their militaristic behavior, and in order to see her son Bellri, director of the Capital Tower Wilmit Zenam decides to flee to Earth on a small aircraft, with no space suit to put on. Meanwhile, a new attack squad is being formed by the Capital Army, composed solely of Kuntala and led by the enigmatic Mask. Mask and his squad attack the Megafauna as Raraiya is piloting the G-Self during a test flight. The Capital Army appears to be winning the battle when a powerful Amerian mobile armor, the Armorzagan, makes its appearance in the battle and forces the Capital Army mobile suits to flee.
8	"Father, Mother and Mask"; Transliteration: "Chichi to haha to Masuku to" (Japanese: 父と母とマスクと)	November 13, 2014
Mask's forces pull away from attacking Megafauna's mobile suits due to the sudden attacks by the Amerian mobile armor. Ameria Army pilot Mick Jack's test machine, Armorzagan, holds off Mask's forces as Ameria Army's Inspector General Gusion appears with a supply force traveling to the Megafauna. Bellri is surprised to learn that Gusion is the father of Aida. The Inspector General's supply task force refits G-Self's damaged flight pack with an experimental flight pack called the "Tricky Backpack", which gives Bell's G-Self new capabilities to interfere with mobile suit electronics. Aida takes her G-Arcane to escort her father by riding with his transport aircraft, but suddenly abandons her father when they detect the emergence of an unidentified machine from Capital Tower's direction. Mask struggles against the G-Self's Tricky Pack equipment and has to abandon the battle. Meanwhile, Aida pilots her G-Arcane to the limits of her machine's flight altitude in an attempt to intercept the unknown object. Unknown to Aida, the unidentified machine she is trying to intercept is piloted by Bell's mother. After the conclusion of the battle with Mask, Bellri rushes to aid Aida in his G-Self, but soon discovers the inbound orbital glider is his mother. Bell manages to restrain Aida and catches the glider, bringing it safely back to the Megafauna. Capital Tower Operation Director Wilmit Zenam (Bellri's mother) meets face-to-face with Gusion on the Megafauna and he gives his explanation of his nation's motives for posing as pirates and reviving forbidden technologies. Zenam finds it hard to believe, however Aida presents photos of illegal activities around the Moon. Wilmit becomes distraught and tells Bellri and the other former kidnap victims that they're returning to the capital. Elsewhere, Manny, who is aboard the Garanden as a Capital Army recruit and serves as a volunteer on the warship, encounters Captain Mask returning from his defeat. Though he does not admit it, Manny becomes aware of Captain Mask's true identity.
9	"The Megafauna Heads South"; Transliteration: "Megafauna minami e" (Japanese: メガファウナ南へ)	November 20, 2014
Thanks to Bellri's suggestion, the Megafauna decides to head to Capital Territory to gain more information about the coming conflicts. The ship would have come under attack from the Capital Army but manages to fend them off. Through Wilmit's connections, the Capital Guard, led by Lieutenant Kerbes, escorts them to a hiding place.
10	"Escape From Territory"; Transliteration: "Teritorī dasshutsu" (Japanese: テリトリィ脱出)	November 27, 2014
Having been discovered by the Capital Army, the Megafauna escapes from Capital Territory with Lieutenant Kerbes turned rogue while being pursued by the Capital Army officer Becker Shadam, piloting a new unit known as Wuxia. The G-Self helps protect Aida and her G-Arcane, defeating Becker in the process. The ship then launches into space in order to investigate the rumored threat from the moon.
11	"Entering the Space War"; Transliteration: "Totsunyū! Uchū sensō" (Japanese: 突入!宇宙戦争)	December 4, 2014
With both the Capital Army and the Amerian Army greatly boosting their space forces, as well as the perceived threat from the moon, a space war is brewing. A squad of mobile suits known as Mack Knife with several Catsiths from the Capital Army spaceship Garanden, led by Mask, sorties to attack the Megafauna in space, but is fended off by Bellri and the G-Self.
12	"Capital Tower Occupied"; Transliteration: "Kyapitaru· tawā senkyo" (Japanese: キャピタル・タワー占拠)	December 11, 2014
Amerian Army's fleet battles the Capital Army. After the withdrawal of Capital Army forces, the Amerians quietly occupy the top of the Capital Tower and hold the Pope captive. However, unknown forces attack the Amerian Army from Luna orbit.
13	"Those Who Came from the Moon"; Transliteration: "Tsuki kara ki ta hito tachi" (Japanese: 月から来た人たち)	December 18, 2014
The unknown forces identify themselves as Towasanga. After learning this, the Capital Army and the Amerians decided to join forces to fight against the new threat. As the pilots return to the meeting, Klim Nick discovers the true ambitions of Towasanga's force, to carry out their mission of a RECONQUISTA. As one of Towasanga's pilots enrages to a fistfight, he says the Amerian Army's filthy secret is to resupply themselves with Photon Batteries from Towasanga.
14	"Space and Mobile Suit Battles"; Transliteration: "Supēsu to kidō senshi no tatakai" (Japanese: スペースと機動戦士の戦い)	December 25, 2014
As the situation intensifies, Raraiya identifies Towasanga's army members and what their capabilities are. After a battle, the Megafauna manages to capture one of Towasanga's troops and his Mobile suit, holds him hostage, and asks him what lies inside Towasanga.
15	"Fly Forth! To Towasanga"; Transliteration: "Tobe! Towasanga e" (Japanese: 飛べ! トワサンガへ)	January 8, 2015
As the Megafauna crew move towards Towasanga they are intercepted by a Dorette ship, Raraiya now fully healed joins the fight.
16	"Bellri's War"; Transliteration: "Beruri no sensō" (Japanese: ベルリの戦争)	January 15, 2015
Bellri and Aida discover their true origin: both were born in Towasanga as biological siblings of the Rayhunton family, their mother and father being leading figures in a resistant movement. Unsure how to feel Bellri rushes out in the G-Self.
17	"Aida's Decision"; Transliteration: "Aīda no ketsudan" (Japanese: アイーダの決断)	January 22, 2015
While cleaning up colony debris the Megafauna crew are attacked by Mask and Barara in an experimental new mobile suit. Aida wishes to know more about the origins of photon batteries and the Venus Globe.
18	"Ride the Crescent Moon"; Transliteration: "Mikadzuki ni nore" (Japanese: 三日月に乗れ)	January 29, 2015
To reach venus the Megafauna must board another larger ship, the Crescent Moon. When boarding Bellri and Aida find their Rayhunton necklaces have an effect on the engine.
19	"The Venus Globe Gang"; Transliteration: "Bīnasu Gurobu no ichidan" (Japanese: ビーナス・グロゥブの一団)	February 5, 2015
While keeping fit and discussing ideals a group calling themselves the G-IT Lab take control of the ship. Bellri is knocked unconscious by a traitor in the crew.
20	"Space Inside a Frame"; Transliteration: "Furēmu no aru uchū" (Japanese: フレームのある宇宙)	February 12, 2015
The G-self has been taken but the crew have not given up. A batlle ensues and the Venus Globe is badly damaged by Kia.
21	"The Weight of the Sea"; Transliteration: "Umi no omo-sa" (Japanese: 海の重さ)	February 19, 2015
As the Megafauna crew investigate the Venus Globe finding many powerful Mobile Suits, the G-IT Lab try to fix their mistake suffering a huge loss.
22	"Reunions in the Earth Sphere"; Transliteration: "Chikyū-ken saikai" (Japanese: 地球圏再会)	February 26, 2015
Aida has a meeting with La Gu, the leader of the Venus Globe, finding out the shocking truth behind what space has done to people's bodies and the origin of who she knows as Cumpa Rusita. The Crescent Moon returns to earth.
23	"The Sound of a Newtype"; Transliteration: "Nyūtaipu no oto" (Japanese: ニュータイプの音)	March 5, 2015
As the Dorette fleet strengthens, Rockpie Geti talks to Mashner Hume about their feelings and care for each other. As the battle begins, Becker Shadam of the Capital Army launches the Wuxia team to triple battle the Dorette Fleet and the Amerians and the Megafauna. As the Amerians retreat, Rockpie shows the potential of the Gaitrash's Beam Curtain, which he uses as a whip to slash out the Wuxia team's attack, taking out Becker's machine and killing him. Then, one of the three Ten Police units of the Megafauna group tries to stop the Gaitrash but is also taken out, forcing Bellri to use the G-Self's Perfect Backpack to nullify the Gaitrash's Beam Curtain, leaving Rockpie unarmed for Bellri to use Assault mode to shoot the Gaitrash. As Rockpie meets his fate, he yells to Mashner for mercy.
24	"Space Kaleidoscope"; Transliteration: "Uchū no Kareidosukōpu" (Japanese: 宇宙のカレイドスコープ)	March 12, 2015
G-IT Corp and Captain Mask's forces unite and begin their plan to land on Earth. The Amerian and Dorette Fleets initially agree to an Armistice, with Capital Tower's leader free to return after being held hostage. The Amerian and Dorette forces agree to join forces to fight the Capital Army, while secretly the Dorette Fleet plans carry out the Reconguista, a colonization of Earth. However, the Full Moon ship, under control of the G-IT Corp, launches the unique Mobile Armor called the Yggdrasil. This mobile armor uses its unique Tender Beam and Reflective barrier to ravage the Dorette and Amerian fleets, while the Megafauna launches its complement of Mobile Suits and tries to stop Yggdrasil.
25	"Crossing the Line of Death"; Transliteration: "Shisen wo koete" (Japanese: 死線を越えて)	March 19, 2015
The G-IT Corp and Captain Mask's forces come under fire by the surviving forces of both the Amerians and the last ship of the Dorette Fleet. Everyone races to try to intercept the G-IT Corp's Full Moon ship, while Captain Mask and Manny use their newly acquired Venus-built Mobile Suits to lead his forces in defense of their ships. They manage to destroy the last warship of the Dorette Fleet and its mobile suit forces as everyone enters reentry. Bellri, trying to recon the situation, comes under attack by Captain Mask and Manny in her stolen G-Rach but they are forced to withdraw due to reentry into the Earth's atmosphere, which they barely survive.
26	"Rising on Earth"; Transliteration: "Daichi ni tatsu" (Japanese: 大地に立つ)	March 26, 2015
As the battle intensifies, Bellri manages to subdue Kun Soon of G-IT Corp and Captain Mask without killing them both. Eventually Aida manages to halt the battle. Later on, the Crescent Ship and the Megafauna peacefully depart to Ameria. As the victory ceremony continues in Ameria, President Zucchini Nicchini lies that his son Klimton fought to his death in the war, but he suddenly sees the moon split and the Crescent Ship appear. Klimton, angry not only at his father's lies but also at the filthy distribution of Photon Batteries from Towasanga to Ameria, orders Steer to run over the president with the Crescent Ship. As the ship runs through the city streets, it throws the president off the stage and large pieces of debris fall on him, possibly killing him, with the citizens running away from the destruction caused by the ship. Later on, as the survivors start to get along, Bellri decides to travel around the world on his own, with Japan as the starting point.
