= List of Cardfight!! Vanguard characters =

This is a list of characters that are within the Cardfight!! Vanguard media franchise.

== Main characters ==
=== Team Q4 (Quadrifoglio) ===
Aichi Sendou (先導 アイチ, Sendō Aichi)
Voiced by: Tsubasa Yonaga (Japanese); James Beach (English)

The main protagonist of the original "Cardfight!! Vanguard" series. When he was younger, Aichi was a very shy and lonely boy who was frequently bullied at school. After receiving the rare card "Blaster Blade" from Toshiki Kai one day, he begins to come out of his shell. He eventually meets Kai once more and is persuaded to become a Vanguard player, slowly learning the rules and improving his skills as the series progresses. In the first season, Aichi uses a Royal Paladin deck.

Later in the first season, Aichi awakens the power of Psyqualia, a rare psychic ability that gives him the power of precognition during Vanguard battles. However, using Psyqualia corrodes the user's personality, turning Aichi into a cold-blooded, overconfident opponent. Under the manipulation of Ren Suzugamori, a fellow Psyqualia user, Aichi embraces Psyqualia to gain the strength he believes he needs to surpass Kai. Symbolic of this, he abandons his Royal Paladin deck in exchange for a Shadow Paladin deck and begins to use Kai's "Final Turn" catchphrase when he foresees victory.

Aichi is convinced to abandon Psyqualia after a match with Kai, in which he realizes his true wish of fighting Kai on equal terms without reliance on Psyqualia. He also regains his Royal Paladin deck. However, Aichi cannot completely rid himself of his desire to use the Psyqualia. He eventually embraces both the light and dark sides of himself – the part that embraces Psyqualia and the part that rejects it – and goes on to defeat Ren, also ridding him of Psyqualia in the process. After his fight with Ren, Aichi loses his Psyqualia, but he is not disheartened by it at all.

In the second season, he uses a Gold Paladin deck after the Royal Paladin clan is sealed away. in the third season Aichi re-enrolls in Miyaji Academy with Misaki and start a Cardfight Club at his school. in the fourth season, Aichi mysteriously disappears from the world, and no one except for Kai and eventually a few of his friends, remember him. He willingly sealed himself in a sanctuary where the Quatre Knights resided and guarded him. It is later revealed that his reason for his confinement was to contain the seed of Link Joker, which was implanted in him soon after defeating Reversed Takuto. Eventually, Kai gets Aichi to see the error of his ways, destroys the seed into tiny benign shards, and brings him back.

In the second series of "Cardfight!! Vanguard G", Aichi is studying abroad in America. Despite living abroad, he helps Ibuki and his friends in regards to the Plan G.

Toshiki Kai (櫂 トシキ, Kai Toshiki)
Voiced by: Takuya Satō (Japanese); Ryan Luhning (English)

One of the main protagonists, and a powerful Vanguard player who attends Hitsue High School. Kai only likes to battle strong players and dislikes those who run away or cannot back up their boasts with skill. He battles with a Kagero deck, usually surrounding a "Dragonic Overlord" card. He has a few trademark quirks when fighting, such as adding "the" to his move declarations (e.g. – "Stand up THE vanguard!", "Check THE drive trigger!", and "Stride THE generation!") and declaring "Final Turn" when he is confident he will win by the end of the current turn.

Although he has a cold and stoic personality, Kai is shown to be concerned with Aichi's development, especially after Aichi awakens the power of Psyqualia. Having previously witnessed the corrosive effects of Psyqualia on his former friend Ren, Kai attempts to dissuade Aichi from using Psyqualia by telling him he lacks true strength and then quitting the team. However, his words have the opposite effect intended, making Aichi grow more reliant on Psyqualia for strength. It is later revealed that Kai's true purpose for leaving the team was to train alone and grow strong enough to defeat Aichi, saving him from Psyqualia's influence.

In the second season, Kai loses his Kagero deck and instead uses a Narukami deck, which he still uses in the third season. During the second season, Kai temporarily joins New AL4, taking Tetsu's place. In season 3, Kai is a member of Hitsue High School's Vanguard Club along with Miwa, Morikawa, and Izaki. However, he soon realizes that his current strength is below that of Aichi and Ren. He later confronts Takuto for answers after seeing Naoki Reversed but ultimately gets Reversed himself. Unlike other Reversed fighters, Kai willingly accepted his destiny to be reborn as a Reversed card-fighter in exchange for the power to face Ren and Aichi as their equal. As a Reversed fighter, Kai uses a Link Joker deck. Later, he uses a Reverse Kagero deck against Ren and his last confrontation with Aichi.

In the fourth season, because of Aichi's evanescence, Kai becomes the main protagonist. He was the only person to remember Aichi after his disappearance, but he eventually helped Naoki, Misaki, Miwa, and Kamui also remember him. In this season, Kai uses a Royal Paladin deck in search for the missing Aichi. However, after his Blaster Blade Seeker card is taken by Kourin, he later returns to using a Kagero deck (which was built and given by Miwa) once again.

Misaki Tokura (戸倉 ミサキ, Tokura Misaki)
Voiced by: Izumi Kitta (Japanese); Carol-Anne Day (English)

The cashier for the Card Capital shop and another Vanguard player who attends high school at Miyaji Academy. The niece of Shin Nitta, Misaki has eidetic memory. She is not as enthusiastic as some players are when it comes to Vanguard, but she enjoys it all the same. Normally, Misaki is calm and quiet, but she can become quite stern when she wants to, scaring almost everybody. It is revealed later she lost both of her parents when she was little and has not played Vanguard ever since until recently. After the events of episode 25, Misaki starts wearing around her neck the key to a box that contained a deck that her deceased parents made for her when she was a child. In the first and second seasons, Misaki uses an Oracle Think Tank deck. In the third and fourth season, she switches to a Genesis deck and also becomes a member of Aichi's Cardfight Club at school.

In the second series of "Cardfight!! Vanguard G", Misaki becomes the owner of the Card Capital franchise and uses Oracle Think Tank and Genesis. She is said to care deeply about Aichi.

Kamui Katsuragi (葛木 カムイ, Katsuragi Kamui)
Voiced by: Shizuka Ishikawa (Japanese); Melissa Dorsey (English)

A 12-year-old boy with a big mouth and the skill to back it up. As a testament to his confidence, he will often refer to himself as "The Great Kamui" while card-fighting. (In the Japanese version, Kamui says "ore-sama", which is an audacious way of refer to oneself.) He is very enthusiastic and energetic about Vanguard and does not care who his opponent is so long as they are not weak in his eyes. He hates being looked down upon because of his size and age. But being a young kid, he has a habit of messing up the phrasing of his words, often having to be corrected by someone else, which is a running gag within the show. He also has a crush on Aichi's little sister, Emi, and constantly vies for her attention, even going as far as to refer to Aichi as his "older brother". Ironically, another girl, Nagisa Daimonji, has a huge crush on Kamui and wants to marry him as soon as possible, but he does not feel the same way about her. Kamui is almost always accompanied by two kids, Reiji Uno and Eiji Saga, who greatly respect and praise him. Kamui uses a Nova Grappler deck. In season 3, Kamui, Reiji, and Eiji graduate from elementary school and become students at Hitsue Junior High School. He later becomes a Reversed fighter, but he returns to normal after being defeated by Aichi in episode 151.

In the second series of "Cardfight!! Vanguard G", Kamui is now in high school and works part-time at Card Capital 2, where he offers support to customers, especially Chrono.

=== Miyaji Academy Cardfight Club ===
Miyaji Academy Cardfight Club is a club founded by Aichi at Miyaji Academy with the purpose of gathering people who are interested in playing Vanguard.

Kourin Tatsunagi (立凪 コーリン, Tatsunagi Kōrin)
Voiced by: Suzuko Mimori (Japanese); Stevie Forzani (Seasons 1-2) (English), Cheryl McMaster (Season 3) (English)

The blonde member of Ultra Rare. Publicly, she and the other sisters are cheerful and smiling idols, but when she is not on stage, Kourin is a no-nonsense and all-business woman. She is a skilled Vanguard player who utilizes a Royal Paladin deck, the same clan that Aichi uses but with different units and playstyle. Although she denies that she cares about Aichi, which her sisters often poke fun about, it is subtly hinted that she is somewhat interested in him. In season 2, she and her sisters use Angel Feather decks. In season 3, she transfers to Aichi's class in high school to get a feeling of a normal life by order of Takuto. She becomes a member of Aichi's Cardfight Club. Kourin returns to using a Royal Paladin deck. It is later revealed that she is one of many Reversed fighters. In episode 157, it is revealed that Kourin, Suiko, and Rekka were summoned by Takuto to be his agents, and none of the girls have memories of their pasts. In season 4, Kourin has also gone missing from almost everyone's memories except for Kai and Misaki, who has kept Kourin's hairband and wears it on her wrist. Kourin later reappears but allied with the Quatre Knights. She is the one who takes the card "Blaster Blade Seeker" from Kai, claiming to return him to his rightful owner, Aichi them she was defeated by Naoki Made Kourin back to her senses in episode 191 Kai's final battle and got concerned when Aichi's powers are acting up again. During Aichi and Kai's battle, she realized that Aichi Legions his avatar, Star-vader, Blaster Joker with her avatar, Companion Star Star-vader, Photon and he was not giving in to Kai and his mates after Kai won and Aichi fainted due to the after effects of the Seed's power, the moon palace breaks down. Kourin thanking Aichi for everything. In the Manga and V-Anime, she uses a Gold Paladin deck and is a Takuto's Called Walker (an assistant to the Concert Master)

Naoki Ishida (石田 ナオキ, Ishida Naoki)
Voiced by: Tōru Nara (Japanese); Stewart Cummings (English)

Aichi's red-headed classmate who is first introduced in season 3 (episode 105). Prior to the series' beginning, both Naoki and Aichi attended the elementary school division of Miyaji Academy. During this time, Aichi was being bullied, but Naoki did nothing to help him, which made him feel guilty. At first, he did not know what Vanguard was, but one day, when he followed Aichi into Card Capital, he became interested in the game. He is then taught the rules of card-fighting by Aichi while using a Narukami trial deck, which he later purchases. Naoki is irritated by Miyaji Academy's focus on schoolwork and determent of pursuing one's ambitions. He later becomes Aichi's friend and a member of his Cardfight Club. His veneration for the game is recognized by his fellow club members and earns him to become the vice-captain of the Cardfight Club. As a new player to Vanguard, Naoki tends to easily get excited by the game's intricacies, which sometimes make all those around him feel uncomfortable. He has a tendency to say "Break Time!" while doing a Break Ride, which confused the Student President once.

Shingo Komoi (小茂井 シンゴ, Komoi Shingo)
Voiced by: Hiroyuki Yoshino (Japanese); Hans Wackershauser (English)

Aichi's classmate who wears glasses and has a bowl-cut hairstyle. He is a proficient card-fighter but has little tolerance for inexperienced players, namely Naoki; the two's contrasting personalities often causes them to argue with each other. He is particularly envious of Naoki for being with Aichi, who Shingo idolizes as his hero. Incidentally, he also respects Aichi's Q4 teammates and any other famous card-fighters in the highest regard. Shingo has multiple decks; so far, he is shown to have decks for Murakumo, Spike Brothers, and Narukami clan. In the manga uses a Murakumo Deck and the V-Series uses a Nubartama deck.

=== Team TRY3 ===
Chrono Shindou (新導 クロノ, Shindō Kurono)
Voiced by: Mark Ishii (Japanese); Sam Duke (English)

The main protagonist of the fifth series, "Cardfight!! Vanguard G". He is a lonely teenager who, like Kai, has a tough exterior but is a nice person. Before getting into Vanguard, he was anti-social and wasn't interested in much of anything. However, since getting into Vanguard, his personality underwent a refurbishment. In his debut, he is unfamiliar with the Cardfight!! Vanguard card game due to it not being available to him at the orphanage. His deck is composed of the unique Gear Chronicle clan, which he received from an anonymous person who is later revealed to be Kouji Ibuki. He uses Vanguard as a means to find something to be passionate about. In Season 8, after Chrono graduates from middle school, he enrols to high school as a freshman at Tokyo Metropolitan Harumi High School and becomes an employee of Card Capital 2, replacing Kamui. He also forms his own team with Tayiou and newcomer Kazuma Shouji, who goes to the same high school as him, to take part in an U-20 championship.

Shion Kiba (綺場 シオン, Kiba Shion)
Voiced by: Junya Enoki (Japanese); Cole Hanson (English)

A popular and athletic schoolmate of Chrono's and a very skilled fencer from a high class. Shion sees himself as a rival to Chrono. As the heir to the Kiba family fortune, he was brought up to be a man befitting the upper class. One day, his fencing classmate lost a card, which Shion accidentally destroyed. During a trip to a card shop to buy a replacement, he noticed a Blue Sky Knight, Altmile, on sale. This was the catalyst for Shion becoming a card-fighter. In Season 8, after Shion graduated from middle school, he enrolled to Fukuhara High School as a freshman the same school which Ren went to. Like Chrono, he also forms his own team to take part in U-20 Championship, which resulted in him and Chrono being rivals. He uses a Royal Paladin deck.

Tokoha Anjou (安城 トコハ, Anjō Tokoha)
Voiced by: Emi Nitta (G Season 1-3), Aina Aiba (G Season 4) (Japanese); Emma Duke (G Season 1-3), Anna Barker (G Season 4) (English)

Chrono's classmate and the younger sister of Mamoru. She is a strong Cardfighter but is often compared to her popular brother. She is an eighth grader in the same class as Chrono Shindou. She takes care in giving simple-to-understand lectures to beginners. As Mamoru Anjou's younger sister, she is burdened by the high expectations of others. In Season 8, after she graduated from middle school, Tokoha went abroad to study in Paris and, like Chrono and Shion, she formed her own team to take part in an U-20 championship and her team consisted of her best friend Kumi and former member of company Satoru. She uses a Neo Nectar deck.

=== Team Striders ===
Team Striders is the team which Chrono formed to enter U-20 championship after TRY3 went their separate paths. Chrono and his former teammates form their own team in order to decide their own future and, as a result, they all ended up being rivals.

Chrono Shindou (新導 クロノ, Shindō Kurono)
Taiyou Asukawa (明日川 タイヨウ, Asukawa Taiyō)
Voiced by: Houko Kuwashima (Japanese); Conrad Dickinson (English)

He was taught how to play by Chrono during his first visit to Card Capital 2. Originally a timid boy, Taiyou became obsessed with becoming a stronger fighter like Chrono and, thus, joined Team Demise. After Kanzaki's resignation, Taiyou became friends with Chrono and eventually participated in the final battle with Company in Stride Gate. In Season 8, Taiyou enrolled to middle school as a freshman at Miyaji Academy and became a member of Chrono's new team after TRY3 split up. He uses Gold Paladin deck with Sunrise Ray Radiant Sword, Gurguit being his ace.

Kazuma Shouji (東海林 カズマ, Shōji Kazuma)
Voiced by: Shogo Batori (Japanese); Rylan Strachan (English)

A passionate fighter with a no-nonsense attitude who goes to the same high school as Chrono. Kazuma is likely to give up quickly. Despite being a novice in card-fighting, he may have a connection to Vanguard from when he was a kid. He always takes a frivolous and motiveless attitude, and hides a searing heart. He uses a Shadow Paladin deck with his ace being Dragheart Luard and Dragdriver, Luard. In Vanguard GZ, he is temporarily possessed or "Diffriden" by the main antagonist of the season, Divine Dragon of Destruction Gyze, with the aforementioned card temporarily becoming his avatar until he is defeated by Chrono.

== Supporting characters ==
Katsumi Morikawa (森川 カツミ, Morikawa Katsumi)
Voiced by: Noriaki Sugiyama (Japanese); Lucas Gilbertson (English)

A classmate of Aichi's and a Vanguard player. At the beginning of the series, Morikawa was viewed as a bully as he stole Aichi's Blaster Blade card from him. However, after Aichi defeated Kai in episode 2, he and Aichi became friends. Morikawa likes to think he is a strong player because of his huge beliefs in saturating his deck with as many powerful grade 3 units from various clans as he can. However, as a result, his deck is heavily imbalanced, making him unable to ever win. Due to all of his losses, some characters, especially Kamui, change the first part of his name "Katsu" (meaning "win" in Japanese) and calling him "Makemi" ("make" meaning "lose") much to his chagrin in the Japanese version. (In the English dub, he is straightforwardly called a "loser".) He constantly blames his bad luck as the reason for his losses. Since meeting Ninja Master M, Morikawa developed a fascination for ninjas. He was given the mantle of Ninja Master M from Mr. Mark and calls himself "Second Generation Ninja Master M" ("New Ninja Master M" in the English dub) before entering the second Card Capital tournament, where he formed Team Overthrow with Izaki, Miwa, and Emi, who also assumed the disguise of "Princess Maiden".

Although viewed by many to be a weak player, Morikawa is actually shown to be a strong card-fighter when he has a well-structured and balanced deck. In episodes 51-52, when Morikawa received the Golden Mechanical Soldier structure deck, he proceeded to beat all of his opponents, including Aichi, and won the senior division of the Card Capital Shop Tournament. Morikawa is also a huge fan of Kourin from Ultra Rare; he's a member of the Ultra Rare fan club, he buys Kourin merchandise, and he loudly cheers for her at events, dragging his friends into being part of his cheering squad much to their dismay. He also gets agitated whenever he sees someone else get close to her. In season 3, Morikawa and Izaki graduate from Hitsue Junior High School. They enrol into Kai and Miwa's school, Hitsue High, and become members of the school's Vanguard Club.

Shin Nitta (新田 シン, Nitta Shin)
Voiced by: Shuta Morishima (Japanese); Scott Roberts (English)

Full name being "Shinemon", he is the Manager of the Card Capital shop and Misaki's uncle. Card Capital was originally run by Misaki's parents, but after they died, Shin took it upon himself to continue managing the shop in their stead and also take care of Misaki. He enjoys it when people are having a good time in his card shop. He refers to Misaki's pet cat as the "Assista-cat" ("Sub-Manager" in the Japanese version) and even gets it to do certain tasks for him, though sometimes the cat seems to be the one in control. He comes up with the name for Aichi, Kai, Kamui, and Misaki's team as "Quadrifoglio" (Note: "Quadrifoglio" is Italian for "four-leaf clover".) (abbreviated as Q4). To his chagrin, Misaki will often refer to Shin by his name, even after he tells her to refer him by a more formal title such as "Manager" in the card shop or "Coach" while at tournaments.

Taishi Miwa (三和 タイシ, Miwa Taishi)
Voiced by: Showtaro Morikubo (Japanese); Jonathan Lachlan-Stewart (Season 1) (English), Joel Crichton (Season 2 onward) (English)

A wise-cracking teenager who attends Hitsue High School, the same as Kai. He is one of the few people on friendly terms with Kai as they also went to the same elementary school together. Miwa understands that Kai is actually a nice person despite his harsh choice of words. It is revealed in episode 38 that not only does Miwa use a Kagero deck like Kai, but he is also Kai's training partner. In season 2, whenever Shin and Team Q4 went overseas to participate in the Vanguard Fight Circuit, Miwa was put in charge of managing Card Capital in Shin's place. Furthermore, in season 2, because of the Kagero clan being sealed away and forgotten, Miwa used a Narukami deck like Kai. In season 3, Miwa was a member of his school's Vanguard Club along with Kai, Morikawa, and Izaki. He also reverted to using a Kagero deck. He was Reversed by Kai, but he returned to normal after being defeated by Misaki in episode 152.

Yuta Izaki (井崎 ユウタ, Izaki Yūta)
Voiced by: Takayuki Yamaguchi (Japanese); Jeff Watson (Seasons 1-2) (English), Brett Bauer (Season 3) (English)

Aichi and Morikawa's classmate. Like Morikawa, he was viewed as a bully at the beginning of the series, but he later becomes Aichi's friend. His deck was at first a mix of the Tachikaze and Kagero clans and then solely becomes a Tachikaze deck. Unlike Morikawa, he is decent at Vanguard. Izaki usually plays the straight man to Morikawa's antics.

Emi Sendou (先導 エミ, Sendō Emi)
Voiced by: Atsuko Enomoto (Japanese); Wendy Morrison (Seasons 1-2) (English), Rachel Peacock (Season 3) (English)

Aichi's little sister and an elementary student of Miyaji Academy. She is very caring for her older brother. When he got into Vanguard, she started to feel a bit neglected but was nonetheless happy to see Aichi becoming passionate about something. Emi eventually got interested in playing Vanguard herself. Her liking of cute things played a part when she made her own deck; it was at first a mix of Oracle Think Tank and Bermuda Triangle clans, and it eventually became a pure Bermuda Triangle deck. Disguising herself as "Princess Maiden", Emi, Morikawa, Miwa, and Izaki once played together as Team Overthrow for the Card Capital Team Tournament during episodes 37-38. She was the champion of the Card Capital Shop Tournament's junior division during episodes 51-52 for having the most wins within the tournament's time limit. Although Kamui has an obvious crush on her, Emi remains innocently unaware of Kamui's affection for her. In season 3, Emi became a middle school student at Miyaji Academy. She is one of the founding members of her school's Cardfight Group along with Mai and Rekka.

Shizuka Sendou (先導 シズカ, Sendō Shizuka)
Voiced by: Emi Shinohara (Japanese); Carol-Anne Day (English)

Aichi and Emi's mother. When Aichi was in elementary school at Miyai Academy, he was being bullied. To protect her son from further bullying, she had Aichi transferred to Hitsue Middle School by the time he graduated from elementary school.

Mai Tobita (飛田マイ, Tobita Mai)
Voiced by: Shizuka Ishigami (Japanese); Carol-Anne Day (English)

Emi's best friend and classmate at Miyaji Academy. She became a Vanguard player, using a Neo Nectar deck, sometime after Emi became interested in the game. In season 3, Mai became a middle school student at Miyaji Academy and also switched to a Bermuda Triangle deck. She is one of the founding members of her school's Cardfight Group along with Emi and Rekka.

Reiji Uno (右野 レイジ, Uno Reiji)
Voiced by: Noriko Shitaya (Japanese); Katie Rowan (Seasons 1-2) (English), Shannon Burgess (Season 3) (English)

One half of Kamui's entourage who wears glasses and a ponytail. He and Eiji look up to Kamui to the point that they frequently refer to him as "The Great Kamui". Like Kamui, Reiji uses a Nova Grappler deck.

Eiji Saga (左賀 エイジ, Saga Eiji)
Voiced by: Kumiko Higa (Japanese); Patricia Bacchus (English)

The other half of Kamui's supporters who have topknot hair. In the Japanese version, Eiji often speaks in acronyms; he abbreviates whatever Reiji says before him and ends his sentences with "-ssu". In the English dub, Eiji speaks full sentences in a slight "hip hop" accent and typically ends them with "yo". Eiji also uses a Nova Grappler deck like Kamui and Reiji.

Mark Whiting (マーク・ホワイティング, Māku Hōwitingu)
Voiced by: Atsushi Abe (Japanese); Jonathan Love (English)

A teacher at Hitsue Junior High School, a foreigner, and a Vanguard player. Despite not being Japanese, he teaches Japanese history as he is a huge fan of the Sengoku period. Mark has a secret identity: Ninja Master M, in which he wears a ninja outfit, a tie, and a samurai helmet with a vizor that masks his eyes. In the Japanese version, in addition, as Ninja Master M, he speaks in a feudal Japanese accent (e.g. he ends most of his sentences with "-degozaru"). He assumed this disguise at the first Card Capital Shop Tournament, where he faced Aichi in the second round. While playing Vanguard, he declared his moves as if they are ninja techniques. Although Morikawa genuinely believes he is a real ninja, it does not take long for Aichi to see through his disguise. Nonetheless, Mark denies that he is Ninja Master M, even though it is obvious to everyone except Morikawa. He decided to pass down his mantle as Ninja Master M to Morikawa sometime before the second qualifier Card Capital tournament. Mark's deck consists of units mostly from the Nubatama clan, focusing on having card advantage over the opponent. In season 3, Mark becomes a teacher at Hitsue High School and is also the faculty advisor for the school's Vanguard Club. He also re-assumes his Ninja Master identity but renames himself as "Ninja Master Neo".

MC Mya (MC ミヤ, Emu Shī Miya)
Voiced by: Mitsuhiro Sakamaki (Japanese); Roger Rhodes (English)

The square-glasses-wearing master of ceremonies and match commentator of many Vanguard tournaments. Though he may be the MC of these events, he often gets upstaged whenever Ultra Rare appears. In addition to having a habit of sticking his pinky finger out when holding a microphone, MC Mya tends to adopt certain characters' speech patterns, especially his co-commentator Doctor O's emphasis on long "O" sounds.

Doctor O (ドクター・オー, Dokutā Ō)
Voiced by: The Mash (real name: Nobuhisa Nakamoto) (Japanese); Brendan Hunter (English)

Doctor O is a dedicated and knowledgeable man in the Vanguard community. Always wearing white and a graduation cap, Doctor O provides insightful color commentary for tournament matches next to MC Mya while having a habit of forming the letter "O" with his hands. He likes to emphasize the long "O" sounds of his sentences (e.g. "D-o-kidoki desu ne!", which means "It's s-o exciting!"). The character is based on Takuya Ōkouchi, a Japanese producer and businessman closely involved with the Cardfight!! Vanguard franchise and he is also known by the nickname "Doctor O".

Akari Yotsue (四会 アカリ, Yotsue Akari)
Voiced by: Sayuri Yahagi (Japanese); Maddie Duke (English)

Misaki's friend and classmate at Miyaji Academy. A cheerful girl. She sometimes gives helpful encouragement to Misaki. Akari also has a sense of romance.

Mamoru Anjou (安城 マモル, Anjō Mamoru)
Voiced by: Junichi Yanagita (Japanese); Ben Rose (English)

A professional card-fighter and the Kagero clan leader of the region.

Tsuneto Tado (多度 ツネト, Tado Tsuneto)
Voiced by: Rion Kako (Japanese); Alex Cherovsky (English)

The leader of Team Trinity Dragon and the third-best fighter at Card Capital 2. He uses an Oracle Think Tank deck.

Karl Yamaji (山路 カル, Yamaji Karu)
Voiced by: Kotomi Otsuka (Japanese); Alex Day (English)

The second and smartest member of Team Trinity Dragon.

Kei Nagara (長良 ケイ, Nagara Kei)
Voiced by: Shintarō Tanaka (Japanese); Corby Proctor (English)

The third and tallest member of Team Trinity Dragon.

Kumi Okazaki (岡崎 クミ, Okazaki Kumi)
Voiced by: Mikoi Sasaki (Japanese); Nancy Situ (English)

Tokoha's best friend and classmate. She is new to Vanguard and uses an Oracle Think Tank deck.

Jaime Alcaraz (ハイメ・アルカラス, Haime Arukarasu)
Voiced by: Daisuke Kishio (Japanese); Brett Bauer (English)

A card-fighter from Spain. He is positive, outgoing, flirtatious, and excellent at reading people. He uses an Aqua Force deck.

=== Ultra Rare ===
Ultra Rare is a popular idol group of three sisters for the card game Vanguard. One of the true objectives of Ultra Rare is to find people who have the power of Psyqualia. The reasons for finding these people are still unknown.

Rekka Tatsunagi (立凪 レッカ, Tatsunagi Rekka)
Voiced by: Yoshino Nanjō (Japanese); Michelle Molineux (English)

The red-headed and youngest sister of Ultra Rare; she is also the most childish of the group because of her tendency to patronize others in a conceited tone. One example is how she frequently teases Kourin about how she is interested in Aichi, to which Kourin would reply that she does not care much for him in a tsundere fashion. In season 3, similar to Kourin, Rekka transferred into the middle school division of Miyaji Academy. She became friends with Emi and Mai, forming a club with them called the Cardfight Group. In the manga and V-Anime, she uses a Neo Nectar Deck.

Suiko Tatsunagi (立凪 スイコ, Tatsunagi Suiko)
Voiced by: Aimi Terakawa (Japanese); Nikkita Bradette (English)

The blue-haired and eldest sister of Ultra Rare, Suiko is the most mysterious of the group and the manager of Card Shop PSY. Suiko is able to sense Psyqualia in other people. Although she is the most mature of the sisters, Suiko is shown to have a slightly sadistic side to her. In season 3, like her sisters, Suiko enrolled into high school by order of Takuto. However, unlike her sisters, Suiko transferred into Fukuhara High and became a member of the school's Vanguard Club. In all series (original anime, manga and V-anime), she uses an Angel Feather Deck.

=== Tatsunagi Corporation ===
Takuto Tatsunagi (立凪 タクト, Tatsunagi Takuto)
Voiced by: Ayahi Takagaki (Japanese); Patricia Bacchus (English)

A young white-haired boy who is the chairman of the Tatsunagi Corporation and the sponsor for the Vanguard Fight Circuit. While he is formally introduced in episode 66, his first appearance is in episode 57, in which he is amongst a crowd of people in one of Ren's flashback sequences. In addition to having Psyqualia, Takuto has other mystical powers which include memory manipulation, body possession, and the ability to awaken Psyqualia in others. Although Takuto is initially viewed as being the main antagonist of season 2, it is eventually revealed that Void, a dark embodiment of emptiness, is the true villain. Takuto's real objective for orchestrating the VF Circuit is to cultivate card-fighters strong enough to lead the clans of Cray into battle against Void. He also explains that he had altered everyone's memories to forget the 3 sealed clans in order to make room for Aichi, Kai, and Ren to use the new clans, Gold Paladin and Narukami, and develop their skills with them. Takuto has also been acting as the host for Incandescent Lion, Blond Ezel as denoted by the green mark on his forehead, implying but not confirmed that he is the first Diffriden character in the series. After Void is exiled by the efforts of Aichi and his Gold Paladins, Takuto has fulfilled his duty as host and loses the mark as a result.

In season 3, Takuto's body was possessed by Link Joker, an agent of Void. The real Takuto was sealed away while Link Joker posed as him and began his plan to Reverse the entire world.

=== Rummy Labyrinth ===
Luna Yumizuki (弓月 ルーナ, Yumidzuki Rūna)
Voiced by: Haruka Kudō (Japanese); Karen Kelly (English)

A young girl who is part of the idol unit Rummy Labyrinth. Luna is relatively new to playing Vanguard but still tries her best. She uses a Pale Moon deck. Her family name, "Yumizuki" (弓月) comes from the word "Yumiharizuki" (弓張り月), which means "crescent moon". Her name, "Luna", is a reference to the ancient Roman divine personification of the moon.

Am Chouno (蝶野 アム, Chōno Amu)/Ace (エース, Ēsu)
Voiced by: Aimi Terakawa (Japanese); Selia Sangra (English)

A young girl who is Luna's partner in Rummy Labyrinth. Unlike Luna, Am is more professional. While he is critical of Luna, they are still good friends. It is later revealed that she is working with Ryuzu Myoujin under the alias of Ace and the one responsible for Shion's family losing their company. Am uses a Granblue deck. His family name "Chouno" (蝶野) means "butterfly field", while her given name is a play on the Japanese word "amu" (虻), meaning "gadfly."

== Rivals ==
=== Team FFAL4 (Foo Fighter Apex Limited 4) / Team Asteroid ===
Known as "Team Asteroid" in the English dubbed version of the anime, Team FFAL4 is an elite organization of the strongest card-fighters, which consists of about 500 members branched off in different teams. With the addition of Toshiki Kai in the second season, the group renamed itself as "Team NAL4 (New Apex Limited 4)" ("New Team Asteroid" in the English dub version). The organization is also affiliated with Fukuhara Private High School.

Ren Suzugamori (雀ヶ森 レン, Suzugamori Ren)
Voiced by: Atsushi Abe (Japanese); Roger Rhodes (English)

The primary antagonist of the first season and leader and co-founder of Team AL4. Ren is a powerful card-fighter who has a very sadistic personality in which he enjoys mentally tormenting his opponents. He looks down on anyone he faces, claiming that there is no point in trying to beat him since his victory is assured. Ren is also one of the first people revealed to have Psyqualia, which allows him to foresee his victory in his fights. As seen in flashbacks, Ren was an innocent and polite albeit absent-minded person who used to be on the same team with Kai, until his Psyqualia awakened and soon corrupted him into who he is now. Along with Kai, Ren also adds "the" to his move declarations and announces "Final Turn" when he is about to deal the finishing blow on his opponents. He also seems to know when another person has Psyqualia, noted when he meets Aichi at Card Shop PSY to give him the Shadow Paladin deck, which he also uses. The deck acts as the polar opposite of the Royal Paladin deck, which sacrifices allies to gain power instead of working together.

Ren returned in the second season as the leader of New Team AL4. He also used a Gold Paladin deck like Aichi but with a different theme. Ren's personality reverted to his former innocent childlike self in spite of Takuto appearing and reawakening Ren's Psyqualia during his and Aichi's fight during the Seoul Stage of the Vanguard Fight Circuit.

In season 3, Ren was the captain of Fukuhara High School's Vanguard Club. He returned to using his Shadow Paladin deck albeit modified.

In Season 6, Ren became the chief of the United Sanctuary branch, replacing Kanzaki.

Tetsu Shinjou (新城 テツ, Shinjō Tetsu)
Voiced by: Tetsu Inada (Japanese); William Scott (English)

The "General" and the other co-founder of Team AL4, Tetsu is a childhood friend of Ren and Kai. While Kai chose to leave Ren after he started using Psyqualia, Tetsu faithfully stayed as Ren's right-hand man and friend throughout the years, despite being aware of Ren's frightening Psyqualia power. Tetsu is a serious man who will do whatever it takes for Ren's benefit. So, although Tetsu acknowledged that Ren's usage of Psyqualia had gained power for both him and Team AL4, he also secretly hoped for someone, specifically Kai and eventually Aichi, to defeat Ren in a card-fight to snap him out of his Psyqualia addiction. Tetsu utilizes a Dark Irregulars deck. Tetsu appeared again in the second season as the coach of New Team AL4 instead of an active member. He also later appeared under the guise of Joker X and joined with Jun Mutsuki (as King Z) and Yuri Usui (as Queen Y) to form Team Unknown at the Japan Stage of the VF Circuit. Unlike Jun and Yuri, Tetsu's identity is never formally revealed. In season 3, after graduating from Fukuhara High, he became the coach of the school's Vanguard Club.

Asaka Narumi (鳴海 アサカ, Narumi Asaka)
Voiced by: Hitomi Nabatame (Japanese); Laura Rushfeldt (English)

The "Assassin" and only female member of Team AL4. Ever since she was invited to join AL4, she developed an admiration towards Ren to the point that she had romantic feelings for him. Those feelings motivated her to work her way up the ranks to eventually become a proper member of AL4. Although Ren does not show mutual romantic feelings for her, Asaka nonetheless tries her hardest to earn more of Ren's attention and his heart. She also acts as the antagonistic rival for Misaki, defeating her in their first match against each other at the national tournament. Asaka uses a Pale Moon deck; she dubs her deck the Pale Moon Circus, to which she acts as the ringleader. In the second season, despite being fired from AL4 because she lost to Misaki at the following national tournament, Asaka returned as a member of New AL4. In the third season, she was a member of Fukuhara High's Vanguard Club in which she develops somewhat of a rivalry with Suiko for Ren's attention.

Kyou Yahagi (矢作 キョウ, Yahagi Kyō)
Voiced by: Akeno Watanabe (Japanese); Cole Howard (English)

Nicknamed the "Crusher" and a member of Team AL4, Kyou is an arrogant and vengeful Vanguard player who mostly cares about himself, always hoping to surpass Ren and become the best player one day. As a show of his arrogance, he sometimes refers to himself in the third-person perspective as "The Great Kyou" ("ore-sama" in the Japanese version), much like Kamui. As a result of him losing to Kai in the national tournament, Kyou was kicked out of AL4, leaving him bitter for revenge. At the following regional tournament, Kyou returned with his own group of other former AL4 members called Team Avengers to exact his revenge on all those who wronged him. Kyou primarily uses a Spike Brothers deck, but in episode 94, he used a Megacolony deck to counter Leon's Aqua Force deck.

In GIRS Crisis, Kyou rejoined AL4.

=== Team Caesar ===
All members of Team Caesar use Dimension Police decks.

Kenji Mitsusada (光定 ケンジ, Mitsusada Kenji)
Voiced by: Kenji Akabane (Japanese); Jeff Punyi (English)

The leader and "Emperor" of Team Caesar. Also the former champion team of the national tournament before Team AL4. Kenji is not only a strong card-fighter, but he is also an enthusiast of ancient Roman history. So, he named his team after Julius Caesar to express this interest. While Kenji is brimming with confidence and exhibits overbearing power like an emperor while card-fighting, he is actually a friendly and humble man who does not like to be in the spotlight outside of battle. He is affectionately nicknamed "Koutei" by his friends ("koutei" meaning "emperor" in Japanese and is the alternate kanji reading of his last name "Mitsusada" (光定)). In season 2, Kenji decided to leave Japan to study abroad at the Singapore Institute of Technical Studies. His departure lead to a hiatus for Team Caesar. In season 3, Kenji returned to Japan and reunited with his teammates, thus reforming Team Caesar.

Yuri Usui (臼井 ユリ, Usui Yuri)
Voiced by: Mayuki Makiguchi (Japanese); Leda Davies (Seasons 1-2) (English), Ali Deregt (Season 3) (English)

The "Empress" of Team Caesar and Gai's older sister. Yuri has a good personality, but like Misaki, she becomes scary when she gets angry. Yuri is a firm believer in grasping images of how she will win. Her style of card-fighting is taking high risks to attain greater rewards. After Team Caesar was disbanded, Yuri reappeared during the Japan Stage of the VF Circuit disguised as Queen Y and teamed up with Jun Mutsuki (as King Z) and Tetsu Shinjou (as Joker X). She later revealed her identity during her match with Misaki and also used an Oracle Think Tank deck, which she stated was her original deck before joining with Team Caesar.

Gai Usui (臼井 ガイ, Usui Gai)
Voiced by: Setsuji Satō (Japanese); Phil Fulton (English)

The "Gladiator" of Team Caesar and Yuri's younger brother. As the "guard" for the team, Gai does his best for Team Caesar's sake. But if he fails, Gai usually ends up being lectured by Yuri and forced to listen to her stern criticisms.

=== Team Handsome ===
All members (except Nagisa) of Team Handsome use Granblue decks.

Gouki Daimonji (大文字 ゴウキ, Daimonji Gōki)
Voiced by: Kentarō Itō (Japanese); Adam Hunter (English)

The captain of the pirate-themed Team Handsome and an old friend of Kamui. He is a strong card-fighter whose team has previously won the Kanto regional tournament before Team Q4. Gouki cares a lot about his little sister, Nagisa, to the point that he will do anything to make her happy.

Nagisa Daimonji (大文字 ナギサ, Daimonji Nagisa)
Voiced by: Ryō Hirohashi (Japanese); Katie McMillan (English)

Gouki's little sister who has a crush on Kamui. Despite Kamui's constant refusals to accept her love, Nagisa blissfully ignores his rejections and will always come running for him. Originally, she did not play Vanguard. But to get closer to Kamui, she got into the game and eventually became a full-fledged member of Team Handsome. Matching Kamui, Nagisa uses a Nova Grappler deck.

Kaoru Komatsubara (小松原 カオル, Komatsubara Kaoru)
Voiced by: Yūto Kazama (Japanese); Corby Proctor (English)

The "first mate" of Team Handsome. Kaoru has a distinct habit of saying "Ka-boom!" ("Japan!" in the Japanese version) in most of his sentences.

Hiroshi Nakatsugawa (中津川 ヒロシ, Nakatsugawa Hiroshi)
Voiced by: Tsubasa Takanohashi (Japanese); Andrew Gummer (English)

Another member of Team Handsome. Hiroshi was an active member until Nagisa got into Vanguard and worked her way up to bump him into being the alternate player.

=== Team SIT Genius ===
All members of Team SIT Genius are gifted 12-year-old Singaporean boys who have skipped grades to attend SIT (Singapore Institute of Technical Studies) and use Great Nature decks.

Christopher Lo (クリストファー・ロウ, Kurisutofa Rō)
Voiced by: Sayuri Yahagi (Japanese); Sam Krochmal (English)

Simply known as "Chris" to his friends, he is the best card-fighter at SIT, making him the leader. Compared to his teammates, Chris is the most mature of the group. However, Chris began to be inebriated with power and his personality became corrupted after gaining the power of Psyqualia from Takuto. Under the influence of Psyqualia, Chris became obsessed with being the number one card-fighter and maintaining that position. Chris eventually snapped out of his Psyqualia addiction after being defeated by Aichi in episode 100, thus reverting to his normal self.

Lee Shenlong (リー・シェンロン, Rī Shenron)
Voiced by: Asami Shimoda (Japanese); Benjamin Arthurs (English)

The second-best fighter of the team. Lee's family is highly regarded in Singapore, and he feels obligated to be the best in everything he does. Because of this, Lee sees everyone as an enemy, especially Chris. He hopes to someday defeat Chris and take his spot as the number one student. Nonetheless, Lee respects Chris as a card-fighter.

Ali Pajeel (ファジル・アリ, Fashiru Ari)
Voiced by: Keiko Nemoto (Japanese); Sam Duke (English)

The third-best card-fighter of the team. Unlike his teammates, Ali is much more carefree as he is less concerned about his rank and instead focuses his attention on girls. In spite of his young age, he considers himself a ladies' man and boasts about how he has many girlfriends.

=== Team Dreadnought ===
All members of Team Dreadnought use Aqua Force decks.

Leon Soryu (蒼龍 レオン, Sōryū Reon)
Voiced by: Daichi Kanbara (Japanese); Brett Bauer (English)

A young blond-haired man first appearing in season 2 (episode 83). His kin, the Soryu, was once a strong family that ruled over the seven seas because it wielded the power of the Aqua Force clan. However, when Aqua Force suddenly disappeared for unknown reasons, the power of the Soryu family in turn also vanished. The remaining Soryu members foretold a prophecy of a child who would be "embraced by the wind" will come and lead the second coming of both the Soryu and Aqua Force. Leon believes that he is the prophesied one.

Leon is a sombre and prideful man who will go to great lengths to fulfil that mission, even going as far as to say that he would make the entire world his enemy if need be. Leon has the power of Psyqualia, to which he refers as the "wind". He is able to measure the "wind", which tells him what actions to take and how strong his opponents are. In the Japanese version, Leon uniquely says "Stand up, MY vanguard!" at the beginning of each card-fight. (This is somewhat lost in the English dub since almost everyone says this.) Leon is exposed to be allied with Void, the main antagonist of season 2. For his beloved family and Aqua Force, he allowed the Royal Paladin, Shadow Paladin, and Kagero clans to be captured by Void for Aqua Force to be returned. He is defeated by Aichi and then decides to help him in saving the planet Cray from Void.

In season 3, Leon, Jillian, and Sharlene returned as high school students of a currently-unspecified school in Hong Kong. Leon also became friendlier.

In season 6, Leon became the clan master of Aqua Force.

Jillian Chen (ジリアン・チェン, Jirian Chen)
Voiced by: Kana Ueda (Japanese); Courtney Clarkson (English)

One of Leon's escorts and twin sister of Sharlene. In contrast to her little sister, Jillian has a serious personality and also pretentiously looks down on others. However, in season 3, she became much friendlier like Leon. Jillian is also very protective of Leon and reveres him as "master". She takes great offence whenever someone shows the slightest bit of disrespect towards him. As Leon's bodyguards, she and Sharlene have great physical strength and are skilled in martial arts.

Sharlene Chen (シャーリーン・チェン, Shārīn Chen)
Voiced by: Saori Gotō (Japanese); Morgan Partridge (English)

One of Leon's escorts and twin sister of Jillian. Unlike her older sister, Sharlene is laidback and forgetful, similar to Ren. She also talks to Leon in a casual manner, which annoys Jillian. Although Sharlene is typically tranquil, she sometimes grows furious and speaks in a more insulting tone than her sister. After these bursts of anger, Sharlene would get exhausted and then revert to her mellow self.

=== Miyaji Academy Student Council ===
Tatewaki Naito (内藤 タテワキ, Naitō Tatewaki)
Voiced by: Susumu Chiba (Japanese); Scott Roberts (English)

The chairman of Miyaji Academy's student council. He is an elitist, believing that Aichi's Cardfight Club is unnecessary to the school. Even after the club became officially recognized, he continued his attempts to abolish it. After the Link Joker incident, Naito became supportive of the game.

Itsuki Suwabe (諏訪部 イツキ, Suwabe Itsuki)

Voiced by: Junji Majima (Japanese); Daniel Nelles (English)

The vice-chairman of Miyaji Academy's student council. Suwabe is often left to create and/or execute plans to terminate the Cardfight Club while occasionally spying on the club's activities and reporting them back to Naito.

Maki Nagashiro (長代 マキ, Nagashiro Maki)
Voiced by: Reina Ueda (Japanese); Mari Chartier (English)

The secretary of Miyaji Academy's student council. At first, she was introduced as a silent girl. Eventually, it was revealed that she was an agent of Link Joker who had been assigned to monitor the Cardfight Club's activities. She was defeated by Naoki and returns to her normal self. At the end of Season 3, there were some signs of her having a possible romantic with Naoki.

=== Quatre Knights ===
Appearing in the fourth season, the Quatre Knights are four highly skilled card-fighters from around the world and have the duty of guarding Aichi in a sanctuary while also preventing anyone from finding him. They all possess unique powers, including the ability to create a dimension (each is associated with a different element) separated from the real world in which they hold card-fights. Whoever loses within these fight fields faces "Judgment" and suffers pain equal to the damage suffered by their vanguard in the card-fight. However, if they defeat their opponents within the sanctuary inside their field, they instead enact "Memory Judgement" erasing their memories of Aichi and their mission objective.

Olivier Gaillard (オリビエ・ガイヤール, Oribie Gaiyāru)
Voiced by: Hama Kento

The current champion of the European Vanguard Circuit. He is a serious man who claims to have inherited Aichi's will and uses Aichi's Gold Paladin deck as proof. He later uses his own Gold Paladins focusing on the Bluish Flame Liberators.

Phillip Neve (フィリップ・ネーヴ, Firippu Nevu)
Voiced by: Yuya Murakami

The former champion of the European Vanguard Circuit before Gaillard. Neve has a fondness for animals and uses a Dimension Police deck focusing on Metalborgs.

Raul Serra (ラウル・セラ, Rauru Sera)
Voiced by: Kazuyuki Okitsu

The main antagonist of the fourth season and the South American champion. He pretended to ally himself with Aichi by becoming a Quatre Knight in order to take the Link Joker seed that was inside Aichi and use its power for himself. His first fight had him use Musketeer Neo Nectars, he later switches to a Granblue deck and finally uses a Link Joker deck once he obtains some of its power.

Rati Curti (ラティ・カーティ, Rati Kāti)
Voiced by: Rina Satō

The youngest and sole female member of the Quatre Knights. Her favorite food is doughnuts, which she often prioritizes over everything including official tournament matches. Because of her constant disqualifications, along with having a Witch-themed Shadow Paladin deck, Rati is nicknamed the "Uncrowned Witch". Despite being cheerful, she has a negative outlook on life by seeing almost everything as illusions. However, after her second fight with Misaki, she finally has a change of heart towards friendship.

=== Team Demise ===
Team Demise first appears in Season 5 and is affiliated with the United Sanctuary branch.

Rin Hashima (羽島リン, Hashima Rin)
Voiced by: Yui Kondo (Japanese); Caitlynne Medrek (English)

A popular card-fighter due to her strength and beauty, Rin is an arrogant, selfish, and sadistic fighter who uses psychological attacks to enrage or frighten her opponents. She bears a grudge against Mamoru due to a past incident and takes her hatred out on Tokoha. Rin defeated Tokoha at the regional tournament but lost to her at the special match afterwards, causing Rin to quit the team. Rin uses an Angel Feather deck.

Shouma Shinonome (東雲 ショウマ, Shinonome Shōma)
Voiced by: Akira Ishida (Japanese); Mark Linde (English)

A calm and analytic fighter who defeated Shion in the regional tournament. Unlike Rin, Shouma prefers to make his opponents lose confidence. He was later fired from Team Demise after losing to Shion. He uses a Genesis deck. He later reappeared in Season 6 working for Ryuzu Myoujin and for the Company towards the end of Season 6 and at the start of Season 7.

Sugiru Kariya (刈谷 スギル, Kariya Sugiru)
Voiced by: Masahito Yabe (Japanese); Chris Austman (English)

An arrogant fighter who underestimates his opponents. He lost to Chrono in the regional tournament and was kicked out of Demise as a result. He uses a Link Joker deck.

=== Company ===
A group of card-fighters who work for Ryuzu Myoujin.

Satoru Enishi (江西 サトル, Enishi Satoru)
Voiced by: Yoshiaki Hasegawa (Japanese); Nathan Hunt (English)

He is the Dark Zone Branch Chief and is the youngest Branch Chief ever. After Ryuzu was defeated, he resigned his position as a Dark Zone branch chief and wanted to experience a normal life. In Season 8, he joined Tokoha's team along with Kumi to take part in U-20 championship. He uses a Dark Irregulars deck.

Hiroki Moriyama (守山 ヒロキ, Moriyama Hiroki)
Voiced by: Sachiko Kojima (Japanese); Rylan Strachan (English)

He works for Ryuzu Myuojin and is the youngest member of the group. Despite working for Ryuzu, he has a strong sense of justice albeit in a twisted way due to him being bullied constantly as a child. He believes that he is a hero while Chrono and his friends are evil. After Ryuzu was defeated he continued to attend school and became friends with Taiyou He uses a Dimension Police deck.

Sousuke Wakamizu (若水 ソウスケ, Wakamizu Sōsuke)
Voiced by: Shinya Hamazoe (Japanese); Tyrell Crews (English)

Another member of the Company. He usually likes to talk in the third person and has a flamboyant attitude. After Ryuzu was defeated he moved to Singapore and continued working as a scientist. He uses a Megacolony deck.

== Other characters ==
Jun Mutsuki (六月 ジュン, Mutsuki Jun)
Voiced by: Kenji Nojima (Japanese); Brett Olsen (English)

The king of underground fights, in which players do not always abide by the rules and cheating is allowed. He is a strong card-fighter who, despite having underlings to do his bidding, does not trust anyone except himself and his cards. He is also proficient with a whip. However, after being defeated by Kai, Jun develops somewhat of a friendly relationship with him. In season 2, Jun reappears at the Japan Stage of the VF Circuit. He dons the disguise of King Z and is a part of Team Unknown along with Yuri (as Queen Y) and Tetsu (as Joker X). He later unveils himself to Aichi when he faces off against him near the end of the Japan Stage. Jun first used a Dark Irregulars deck in the first season and later a Dimension Police deck in the second and third season.

Kouji Ibuki (伊吹コウジ, Ibuki Kōji)
Voiced by: Mamoru Miyano (Japanese); Daegan Manns (English)

The main antagonist from the Neon Messiah movie, in which he used a Link Joker deck based on Deletors. Kouji later reappeared in the fifth season as one of the supporting characters and employee of the United Sanctuary branch and Coach of Team Demise. He later betrayed the branch after finding out Kanzaki's ambition and entrusted Chrono with the Depend Card, believing that Chrono could use it. It is later revealed that he is the one who has been sending Gear Chronicle cards to Chrono. Similar to Kai, he tends to add "the" on his move declarations. In Cardfight Vanguard G series, Ibuki retained the use of Link Joker clan focused on the Messiah series, which paralleled his redemption from his past mistakes and was the main person who initiating Plan G in the campaign of apprehending Ryuzu Myoujin for his unacceptable actions of summoning the Zodiac Time Beasts from Planet Cray.

Yuichirou Kanzaki (神崎 ユウイチロウ, Kanzaki Yūichirō)
Voiced by: Takehito Koyasu (Japanese); Josh Friesen (English)

The main antagonist of the 5th season and the Branch Chief of United Sanctuary. He is an elitist who believes that "weakness is a sin" and teaches that philosophy to all fighters of the branch. After losing to Chrono, he retired as a branch chief of United Sanctuary. He uses a Shadow Paladin deck.

Ryuzu Myoujin (明神リューズ, Myōjin Ryūzu)
Voiced by: Kokoa Ishii, Shūichi Ikeda (elder) (Japanese); Anna Cummer, Paul Cowling (elder) (English)

The main antagonist of the 6th and 7th season, he is the founder of the vanguard association. After his body died from forcefully summoning the Zodiac Time Beasts, he was "reborn" into a clone body. His ultimate goal is to summon the 12 Zodiac Time Beasts in order to open the Stride Gate and create a world ruled by logic and reason, which would put an end to the countless atrocities born of humanity's irrational nature. Ryuzu claims to hate violence above everything and believes that the conflicts of the world should be solved with logic and reason, which he believes Vanguard can achieve. Ryuzu doesn't seem to hate those who oppose him and simply believes that they don't understand his ideals, and instead of fighting them prefers to invite them to join his cause.
