= Takuya Satō (voice actor) =

Japanese voice actor (born 1984)

- 佐藤 拓也
- Born: May 19, 1984 (age 42); Yamamoto-chō, Watari, Miyagi Prefecture, Japan
- Occupations: Voice actor, singer
- Years active: 2000–present
- Agent: Ken Production
- Notable credit: Cardfight!! Vanguard as Toshiki Kai Gundam Build Fighters as Tatsuya Yuuki JoJo's Bizarre Adventure as Caesar Anthonio Zeppeli Tales of Arise as Alphen Kikai Sentai Zenkaiger as Vroon/Zenkai Vroon

Takuya Satō (佐藤 拓也, Satō Takuya; born May 19, 1984) is a Japanese voice actor and singer affiliated with Ken Production. Before his first main role in anime as Toshiki Kai in Cardfight!! Vanguard in 2011, he was mostly known for dubbing foreign dramas.

== Filmography ==
=== Anime ===
List of voice performances in anime
Year	Title	Role	Notes	Source
2001	Rune Soldier	Louie		
2006	Gintama	Samurai		
2007	Kaze no Stigma	Seed		
2007	Blue Drop	Teacher		
2007	Clannad	Gentleman		
2007	Shugo Chara!	Okashin		
2008	Nabari no Ou	Classmate, Fumonishin		
2008	Monochrome Factor	Bad		
2008	Uchi no Sanshimai	Employee		
2008	Golgo 13	Man		
2008	Nijū Mensō no Musume	Hide		
2008	Birdy the Mighty Decode	Policeman		
2008	Toradora!	Male student		
2008	Yozakura Quartet	Townsperson		
2008	Shugo Chara!! Doki	PA		
2008	Kannagi	Male student, Naughty Phone		
2008	Tytania	Commander		
2009	Hajime no Ippo: New Challenger	Fumito Makino		
2009	Samurai Harem: Asu no Yoichi	Male student, handsome guy		
2009	Kurokami The Animation	Master Route		
2009	Arad Senki: Slap-up Party	Swordsman		
2009	Shangri-La	Subordinate		
2009	Kämpfer	Male student		
2009	A Certain Scientific Railgun	Bad		
2010	HeartCatch PreCure!	Butler		
2010	Big Windup! Natsu no Taikai-hen	Toru Sugita 杉田亨		
2010	Demon King Daimao	Cabinet secretary		
2010	The Tatami Galaxy	Student		
2011–16	Cardfight!! Vanguard series	Toshiki Kai	Also Cardfight!! Vanguard G	
2011	Tiger & Bunny	On-site male live condition		
2011	Ground Control to Psychoelectric Girl	TV man		
2011	Chihayafuru	Various characters		
2011	Un-Go	Representative		
2012	Mysterious Girlfriend X	Nakajima		
2012	La storia della Arcana Famiglia	Sailor		
2012	Medaka Box Abnormal	Itoshima Military Regulations	TV	
2013	Chihayafuru 2	Takashi Nakura		
2013	JoJo's Bizarre Adventure	Caesar Anthonio Zeppeli		
2013	DokiDoki! PreCure	Takuya Nikaidō		
2013	Karneval	Murano		
2013	Gifu Dodo!! Kanetsugu and Kyōji	Keiji Maeda		
2013	Gundam Build Fighters	Tatsuya Yuuki		
2014–15	Minna Atsumare! Falcom Gakuen series	Geis	2 seasons	
2014	Hamatora	Kitazawa		
2014	The Kawai Complex Guide to Manors and Hostel Behavior	Usa's Delusion Twink	TV	
2014–15	Haikyu!!	Yasushi Kamasaki	2 seasons	
2014	Monster Retsuden Oreca Battle	Water Warrior Flow		
2014	Gundam Reconguista in G	Luin Lee		
2014	Aikatsu!	Hosoya Producer	season 3	
2014	Gundam Build Fighters Try	Meijin Kawaguchi III		
2014	Psycho-Pass 2	Asahi Kijirazawa		
2015	Assassination Classroom	Kazutaka Shindō		
2015	World Break: Aria of Curse for a Holy Swordsman	Kirsan Romanovich Pavlyuchenko		
2015	Garo: Crimson Moon	Katsuragi no Hisayori		
2016	Norn9	Masamune Tōya		
2016	Phantasy Star Online 2	Masaya Kudō		
2016	Girls Beyond the Wasteland	Programmer who does not program		
2016	Terra Formars: Revenge	Kyo Hyuga		
2016	Kabaneri of the Iron Fortress	Nisuke, Shion		
2016	D.Gray-man Hallow	Yu Kanda		
2016	Bloodivores	Lee Shin		
2016–18	Touken Ranbu: Hanamaru series	Kōsetsu Samonji, Shokudaikiri Mitsutada		
2017	ACCA: 13-Territory Inspection Dept.	Leliumum Brother		
2017	Katsugeki/Touken Ranbu	Kōsetsu Samonji, Shokudaikiri Mitsutada		
2017	Super Lovers 2	Natsuo Shiba		
2017	Kirakira PreCure a la Mode	Mitsuyoshi Mizushima		
2017	Nana Maru San Batsu	Gakuto Sasajima		
2017	Altair: A Record of Battles	Ibrahim		
2017	Sengoku Night Blood	Kojuro Katakura	mixed-media project	
2018–present	Idolish7 series	Ryunosuke Tsunashi	mixed-media project	
2018	Butlers: Chitose Momotose Monogatari	Tsubasa Hayakawa		
2018	The Thousand Musketeers	Dreyse		
2018	Dakaichi	Chihiro Ayagi		
2019	7 Seeds	Gengorō		
2019	The Ones Within	Kaikoku Onigasaki		
2019	Try Knights	Reo Asamiya		
2019–21	Welcome to Demon School! Iruma-kun	Sabnock Saburo		
2020	A3! Season Autumn & Winter	Tasuku Takato		
2020	Argonavis from BanG Dream!	Shintaro Mashū		
2020–21	Moriarty the Patriot	Albert James Moriarty		
2021	Mazica Party	Oneknight		
2021	Everything for Demon King Evelogia	Gozu		
2022	Don't Hurt Me, My Healer!	Arvin		
2022	Phantom of the Idol	Chihiro Misaki		
2022	The Prince of Tennis II: U-17 World Cup	Tristan Bardot		
2022	VazzRock the Animation	Reiji		
2023	Vinland Saga	Harald		
2023	Ragna Crimson	Baron Sierra		
2023	Firefighter Daigo: Rescuer in Orange	Takuto Tsubaki		
2023	I Shall Survive Using Potions!	Administrator of Earth		
2024	Re:Monster	Gobrou		
2024	Unnamed Memory	Ars		
2024	Delico's Nursery	Dino Classico		
2024	Shinmai Ossan Bōkensha, Saikyō Party ni Shinu Hodo Kitaerarete Muteki ni Naru	Rick Gladiator		
2024	Blue Lock vs. U-20 Japan	Kazuma Nio		
2025	Farmagia	Anzar		
2025	Classic Stars	Lost Vivaldi		
2025	The Too-Perfect Saint: Tossed Aside by My Fiancé and Sold to Another Kingdom	Oswald Parnacorta		
2026	Yoroi-Shinden Samurai Troopers	Sasuke		
2026	Dead Account	Yoimaru Azaki		
2026	The Villainess Is Adored by the Prince of the Neighbor Kingdom	Hartknights		
2026	The Darwin Incident	Omelas		
2026	Drops of God	Issei Tomine		
2026	Mao	Hakubi		
2026	Smoking Behind the Supermarket with You	Sasaki		
2027	Matsurika Kanriden	Akatsuki		

=== Film ===
List of voice performances in film
Year	Title	Role	Notes	Source
2013	DokiDoki! PreCure the Movie: Mana Kekkon!!? Mirai ni Tsunagu Kibō no Dress	Takuya Nikaidō		
2014	Cardfight!! Vanguard: Neon Messiah	Toshiki Kai		
2016	Cyborg 009: Call of Justice	002 (Jet Link)	film series	
2020	Saezuru Tori wa Habatakanai – The Clouds Gather	Shizuma Ageya		
2020	Wave!! Surfing Yappe!!	Kōsuke Iwana		
2021	Dakaichi: Spain Arc	Chihiro Ayagi		

=== Original video animation (OVA) ===
List of voice performances in ova
Year	Title	Role	Notes	Source
2018	Yarichin Bitch Club	Ayato Yuri		

=== TV Drama ===
Year	Title	Role	Notes	Source
2021	Kikai Sentai Zenkaiger	Vroon/Zenkai Vroon	Voice role	

=== Drama CDs ===
List of voice performances in drama CDs
Year	Title	Role	Notes	Source
2017	Requiem of the Rose King	Edward IV	Bundled with the limited edition of vol. 7 of the manga	

=== Video games ===
List of voice performances in video games
Year	Title	Role	Notes	Source
2008	Class of Heroes	Felper (man)	PSP	
2009	Arc Rise Fantasia	Mickey	Wii	
2010	Blaze Union	Leon	PSP	
2010	Ys vs. Trails in the Sky	Geis	PSP	
2010	Record of Agarest War 2	Weiss	PS3	
2012	Generation of Chaos 6	Claude	PSP	
2013–16	Norn9 games	Masamune Tōya	Also Var Commons, Last Era, Act Tune	
2013	JoJo's Bizarre Adventure: All Star Battle	Caesar Anthonio Zeppeli	PS3, Also R	
2013	The Legend of Heroes: Trails of Cold Steel	Machias Regnitz		
2013	Arcadian's Senki	Haveluca	PS3	
2014–16	Cardfight!! Vanguard games	Toshiki Kai	3DS	
2014	Re: Vice D	Amber		
2014	Soushuu Senshinkan Gakuen Hachimyoujin Ten no Toki	Four Seasons		
2014	The Legend of Heroes: Trails of Cold Steel II	Machias Regnitz	PS3, other	
2014	Nekketsu Inou Bukatsu-tan Trigger Kiss	Mutsu Iwao	Other	
2014	Kadenz Fermata Accord: Fortesimo	Julius Chariowald		
2014	Assassin's Creed Rogue	Shay Patrick Cormack	PS3	
2015	Touken Ranbu	Kōsetsu Samonji, Shokudaikiri Mitsutada	PC (general)	
2015	Residents of Clover library II	Aoi	PC (general)	
2015	JoJo's Bizarre Adventure: Eyes of Heaven	Caesar Antonio Zeppeli	PS3, other	
2015	Tokyo Mirage Sessions ♯FE	Abel	Wii U	
2015	Idolish 7	Ryunosuke Tsunashi	iOS & Android	–
2016	Tales of Berseria	Benwick	PS3, other	
2016	Getsuei no Kusari: Sakuran Paranoia	Masashi Tōdō		
2017	Fire Emblem Heroes	Abel, Conrad	iOS, Android	–
2017	Fire Emblem Echoes: Shadows of Valentia	Conrad	3DS	
2017	Shadowverse	Heavenly Knight	Steam, Android, iOS	
2018	Dynasty Warriors 9	Cao Xiu	Steam, PS4, Xbox One	
2018	Food Fantasy (2018)	Beggar's Chicken, Miso Soup, Sake	iOS, Android	–
2018	Idolish7: Twelve Fantasia	Ryunosuke Tsunashi	PS Vita	–
2019	Arknights	Midnight, 12F	Android, iOS; Japanese version; voice removed in March 2026	–
2019	Hero's Park	Kasui Sajō	Android, iOS	–
2020	The Seven Deadly Sins: Grand Cross	Shin	Android, iOS	–
2021	Tales of Arise	Alphen	PS4, PS5, Xbox One, Xbox Series X/S, Steam	–
2021	Angelique Luminarise	Shuri	Nintendo Switch	–
2022	Star Ocean: The Divine Force	Theo Klemrath	PS4, PS5, Xbox One, Xbox Series X/S, Steam	
2024	Love and Deepspace	Zayne	iOS, Android; Japanese dub; replaced by Junta Terashima on June 7, 2026	
2024	Ride Kamens	Matsunosuke Agata / Kamen Rider Agata	iOS, Android	
2024	JoJo's Bizarre Adventure: Last Survivor	Caesar Anthonio Zeppeli	Arcade	

=== Dubbing ===
Year	Title	Role	Voice dub for	Notes	Source
2007	The Beckoning Silence	Andreas Hinterstoisser			
2008	The West Wing	Charlie Young	Dulé Hill	season 5	
2010	Despicable Me	Attendant			
2010	Harry Potter and the Deathly Hallows – Part 1	Bill Weasley	Domhnall Gleeson		
2010	Kick-Ass	Kick-Ass	Aaron Taylor-Johnson		
2011	Harry Potter and the Deathly Hallows – Part 2	Bill Weasley	Domhnall Gleeson		
2011	Downton Abbey	Matthew Crawley	Dan Stevens		
2013	Robocar Poli	Poli			
2014	Kick-Ass 2	Kick-Ass	Aaron Taylor-Johnson		
2014	Not Safe for Work	Thomas Miller	Max Minghella		
2015	The Guest	David Collins	Dan Stevens		
2015	Mr. Robot	Tyrell Wellick	Martin Wallström		
2017	Ouija: Origin of Evil	Mikey Russell	Parker Mack		
2021	SEAL Team	Clay Spenser	Max Thieriot		
2021	The Gentlemen	Raymond Smith	Charlie Hunnam		
2021	Daniel Isn't Real	Daniel	Patrick Schwarzenegger		
2024	The Hunger Games: The Ballad of Songbirds & Snakes	Coriolanus Snow	Tom Blyth		

=== Character Songs ===
List of character songs
Year	Release date	Album	Role	Track title	note
2015	December 2	Secret Night	Trigger	1. "Secret Night"; 2. "Natsu Shiyouze"; 3. "Leopard Eyes"	Character song of Idolish 7
2017	September 20	Regality	Trigger	1. "Secret Night"; 2. "Natsu Shiyouze"; 3. "Last Dimension: Hikigane o Hiku no wa Dare da" 4. "Leopard Eyes"; 5. "Negai wa Shine On The Sea"; 6. "Daybreak Interlude"	Character song of Idolish7
2017	September 20	Regality	Ryunosuke Tsunashi	"Risky na Kanojo"	Character song of Idolish7
2017	September 20	Regality	Trigger	"In the meantime" and "Destiny"	Character song of Idolish7
2018	February 28	Heavenly Visitor	Trigger	"Heavenly Visitor" and "Diamond Fusion"	Character song of Idolish7
2018	July 7	Welcome, Future World!!!	Idolish7, Trigger, and Re:vale	"Welcome, Future World!!!" (short ver.)	Character song of Idolish7
2018	August 15	Touch You	Mori Moori Private School Boys	"Touch You"	Character song of Yarichin Bitch Club
2018	August 15	Touch You	Ayato Yuri	"Touch You"	Character song of Yarichin Bitch Club
2018	August 17	Rock Down Vol. 1: Shidō	Rock Down	1. "Rock Down"; 2. "Yasashii Sekai"; 3. "Kodoku no Vampire"	Character song of Vazzrock
2018	September 26	Idolish7 Collection Album Vol. 1	Mezzo	"Love&Game"	Character song of Idolish7
2018	September 28	Sapphire	Haruto Kujikawa feat. Reiji Amaha	"Answer"	Character song of Vazzrock
2018	October 12	12 Songs Gift	Ryunosuke Tsunashi	"My 10 Plate"	Character song of Idolish7
2018	October 26	Emerald	Reiji Amaha	"Rendez-vous"	Character song of Vazzrock
2018	October 26	Emerald	Reiji Amaha feat. Ayumu Tachibana	"Junjō Graffiti"	Character song of Vazzrock
2019	October 12	Wonderful Octave	Ryunosuke Tsunashi	1. "My 10 Plate"; 2. "Wonderful Octave (Ryunosuke ver.)"	Character song of Idolish7
2019	October 18	Issa Kizuku: Ruby × Emerald	Issa Kizuku feat. Reiji Amaha	"No Instruction"	Character song of Vazzrock
2019	November 29	Reiji Amaha: Emerald × Topaz	Reiji Amaha	"Crazy Night"	Character song of Vazzrock
2019	November 29	Reiji Amaha: Emerald × Topaz	Reiji Amaha feat. Futaba Kizuku	"Sugarpot Rhapsody"	Character song of Vazzrock
2020	January 29	Crescent Rise	Trigger	1. "Crescent Rise"; 2. "Treasure"	Character song of Idolish7
2020	October 30	Paint the Town Red	Rock Down	"Deep Scar: Kokkai no Hitsuji"	Character song of Vazzrock
2020	November 20	Rock Down Vol. 2: The Adventure Begins Here.	Rock Down	1. "Tsukikage Kōta; 2. "Go Dash"; 3. "Jewel Princess"	Character song of Vazzrock
