= Family (May J. album) =

Studio album by May J.
- Released: May 27, 2009
- Genre: Pop
- Label: Rhythm Zone

May J. chronology
Baby Girl (2007)	Family (2009)	For You (2010)

Family is the second album released by May J. and her first under the label Rhythm Zone. No singles were released from the album. It entered the daily Oricon chart at #5 and climbed to #3.

== Track listing ==
=== CD track list ===
1. Garden feat. DJ Kaori, Diggy-Mo', Clench and Blistah
2. もし君と... with Kimaguren
3. 旅立つ君に
4. Family: Interlude-
5. Story of Love
6. Give My Heart
7. サヨナラの他に
8. Remember feat. Clench and Blistah
9. Unity
10. Crescent Moon: Daishi Dance Remix

=== DVD track list ===
1. もし君と… with キマグレン: Music Video
2. Garden feat. DJ Kaori, Diggy-Mo’, クレンチ＆ブリスタ: Music Video
3. 旅立つ君に: Music Video

[bonus movie]

1. "Making of" music videos and private movie in Okinawa

== Charts ==
=== Oricon Sales Chart (Japan) ===
Release	Chart	Peak position	Sales total	Chart run
May 27, 2009	Oricon Daily Albums Chart	3	-	-
May 27, 2009	Oricon Weekly Albums Chart	4	26,662	
May 27, 2009	Oricon Monthly Albums Chart	-	94,848	15 weeks
May 27, 2009	Oricon Yearly Albums Chart	91		
