= I Say Yeah! =

2006 single by various artists

Single by NeOSITE artists (Pushim, Rhymester, Home Made Kazoku, Maboroshi, May J.)
- Released: October 14, 2006
- Genre: J-urban
- Length: 20:17
- Label: Ki/oon (Neosite Discs)
- Songwriters: Micro, May J., Pushim, Kuro, C. Ricketts, S. Sasaki, J. Yamamoto

Home Made Kazoku singles chronology
| "Aikotoba wa Abra Cadabra / Manatsu no Dance Call" (2006) | "I Say Yeah!" (2006) | "Everybody Needs Music" (2006) |

May J. singles chronology
| "I Say Yeah!" (2006) | "Here We Go" (2006) |

"I Say Yeah!" is a single released by all five of the signed artists of Neosite Discs, a sub-label of Ki/oon Records dedicated to R&B, hip hop and reggae, to celebrate the label's 10th anniversary. The single received minor popularity, entering the chart at #8, dropping to #20 in its second week, and staying in the charts for seven weeks. The A-side was the opening theme for NTV's Music Fighter in October.

A live concert was held at Shibuya-AX on October 27, 2006, to celebrate the 10th anniversary, with all of the participating artists performing the A-side from the single as well as a number of their own tracks.

== Track listing ==
=== CD portion ===
1. "I Say Yeah!" (Micro, May J., Pushim, Kuro, C. Ricketts, S. Sasaki, J. Yamamoto) – 4:35
2. "I Say Yeah! (DJ Bobo James RMX)" – 4:34
3. "I Say Yeah! (Breathrough remix)" – 5:55
4. "I Say Yeah! (Fickle remix)" – 5:13

=== DVD portion ===
1. "I Say Yeah!" music video
2. Making of I Say Yeah!
3. "I Say Yeah!" full video with Calvin Voneravong

== Charts ==
Oricon Sales Chart (Japan)

| Release | Chart | Peak position | First week sales | Total sales | Chart run |
|---|---|---|---|---|---|
| October 4, 2006 | Oricon Weekly Singles Chart | 8 | 6,981 | 16,727 | 7 weeks |
