= Baby Girl (album) =

Studio album by May J.
- Released: December 5, 2007
- Genres: R&B, urban contemporary
- Label: Sony Music Japan

May J. chronology
All My Girls (2006)	Baby Girl (2007)	Family (2009)

Baby Girl is the first album released by May J. under the label Sony Music Japan. The album charted on the weekly Oricon chart on the #50 place.

== Track listing ==
=== CD track list ===
1. "Do tha' Do tha'"
2. "My Girls"
3. "Destination" (D.O.I.Hip Hop Mix) (feat. Taro Soul)
4. "Dear..."
5. "Why Why Why..."
6. "Baila Conmigo"
7. "Here We Go" (feat. Verbal (M-Flo))
8. "You"
9. "Jealous Girl"
10. "Baby Eyes" (DJ Watari Remix) (feat. Ken-U)
11. "Feel the Sunshine"
12. "Don't Worry Dear My Boy"
13. "My Way、Your Way"
14. "Love Blossom" (F.P.M.Remix)

=== DVD track list ===
1. "Dear... PV"
2. "Do tha' Do tha' CM"
3. "Do tha' Do tha' PV"
4. "Here We Go feat. Verbal (M-Flo) PV"
5. "My Girls PV"

== Charts ==
=== Oricon Sales Chart (Japan) ===
Release	Chart	Peak position	Sales total	Chart run
December 5, 2007	Oricon Daily Albums Chart	-	-	-
December 5, 2007	Oricon Weekly Albums Chart	50	4,110	
