= Mark Ishii =

Japanese voice actor (born 1991)

- 石井マーク
- Born: November 21, 1991 (age 34); Kashiwa, Chiba, Japan
- Occupation: Voice actor
- Years active: 2013–present
- Agent: Mol+0
- Spouse: Atsuko Enomoto (m. 2016; div. 2018)

Mark Ishii (石井マーク, Ishii Māku; born November 21, 1991 in Chiba Prefecture) is a Japanese voice actor who was affiliated with Space Craft Entertainment but changed to Just Professional from 2016 to 2019. Ishii is best known for his role as Chrono Shindou in the Cardfight!! Vanguard G series, Lev Haiba in Haikyu!! and as Bellri Zenam in Gundam Reconguista in G.

On December 27, 2019, Just Production announced that it ended its contract with Ishii and that he has been diagnosed with a maladjustment and is in poor physical health. Ishii will take a hiatus from voice acting in order to improve his health.

On July 1, 2020, Ishii announced that he was returning to the voice acting industry after a 7-month hiatus, signing with the agency Aksent.

On February 1, 2023, a staff Twitter account for Ishii was opened, which then later became Ishii's own account. On July 1 of the same year, it was announced that Ishii has signed with the agency Mol+0.

== Early life and education ==
Ishii is of Japanese-Filipino ethnicity. He lived in the Philippines for four years during his early childhood but returned to Japan for his school education. He was also a member of his junior high school tennis club. During his junior high school days he played a game called .hack//G.U. and became a fan of Takahiro Sakurai who inspired him to become a voice actor. After graduating from high school, Ishii went to the Tokyo Announcement Academy where he studied to become a voice actor.

== Filmography ==
=== Anime ===
List of voice performances in anime
Year	Series	Role	Notes
2014	When Marnie Was There	Ayaka's brother	
2014	Gundam Reconguista in G	Bellri Zenam	
2014	Cardfight!! Vanguard G	Chrono Shindou'	
2015	Haikyū!!	Lev Haiba	
2015	Gundam Reconguista in G: - From the Past to the Future	Bellri Zenam	
2015	Cardfight!! Vanguard G: GIRS Crisis	Chrono Shindou	
2016	Cardfight!! Vanguard G: Stride Gate	Chrono Shindou	
2016	Cardfight!! Vanguard G: NEXT	Chrono Shindou	
2017	Love Kome	Hikari Hino	
2017	Cardfight!! Vanguard G Z	Chrono Shindou	
2018	Granblue Fantasy The Animation	Elsam	
2019	Welcome to Demon School! Iruma-kun	Dantalion Dali	
2021	Welcome to Demon School! Iruma-kun	Dantalion Dali	
2022	Welcome to Demon School! Iruma-kun	Dantalion Dali	
2023	Flaglia	Tagi	
2024	My Instant Death Ability Is So Overpowered	Rick	
2024	Oblivion Battery	Hironobu Makita	

=== OVA ===
List of voice performances in OVA
Year	Series	Role	Notes
2016	Haikyū!! OVA	Lev Haiba	

=== ONA ===
List of voice performances in OVA
Year	Series	Role	Notes
2018	Armor Shop for Ladies & Gentlemen	Kautz	

=== Video games ===
List of voice performances in video games
Year	Series	Role	Notes
2015	Gundam Reconguista in G: Extreme Force	Bellri Zenam	
2015	Granblue Fantasy	Elsam	
2016	Cardfight!! Vanguard G: Stride to Victory	Chrono Shindou	
2016	Gundam Reconguista in G: Extreme Vs Maxi Boost ON	Bellri Zenam	
2016	Haikyū!! Cross team match	Lev Haiba	
2017	Gakuen Club~Hōkago no Himitsu~	Yūya Yamaoka	
2017	Gakuen Club~Himitsu no Night Club~ PS Vita	Yūya Yamaoka	
2018	On Air!	Nanao Kichijō	

=== Dubbing roles ===
List of voice performances in live action
Title	Role	Voice dub for	Notes
Titans	Garfield "Gar" Logan / Beast Boy	Ryan Potter	

== Personal life ==
On March 6, 2016, he announced his marriage to Atsuko Enomoto. Ishii stated that the reasons he and Enomoto agreed to get married include their shared interests and many commonalities. They divorced in 2018.
