= Gundam Reconguista in G =

Japanese anime television series

- Key visual for the series
- ガンダム Gのレコンギスタ
- Genre: Mecha, science fiction, Military science fiction
- Created by: Hajime Yatate; Yoshiyuki Tomino
- Screenplay by: Yoshiyuki Tomino
- Directed by: Yoshiyuki Tomino (chief)
- Voices of: Mark Ishii; Yū Shimamura; Minako Kotobuki; Ryōta Ōsaka; Ayahi Takagaki; Michiko Kaiden
- Music by: Yugo Kanno
- Country of origin: Japan
- Original language: Japanese
- No. of episodes: 26 (list of episodes)

Production
- Executive producers: Arata Sasaki; Hirô Maruyama
- Producers: Naohiro Ogata; Toshihiro Maeda; Hiroyuki Kikugawa
- Production companies: Sunrise; MBS

Original release
- Network: MBS, TBS, CBC, BS-TBS
- Release: October 2, 2014 – March 26, 2015

Related
- Manga
- Written by: Tamon Ōta
- Published by: Kadokawa Shoten
- Magazine: Gundam Ace
- Original run: August 26, 2014 – September 26, 2019 (hiatus)
- Volumes: 5
- Anime film series
- Directed by: Yoshiyuki Tomino
- Written by: Yoshiyuki Tomino
- Music by: Yugo Kanno
- Studio: Sunrise
- Licensed by: NA: Sunrise
- Released: November 29, 2019 – August 5, 2022
- Runtime: 94–104 minutes
- Films: 5

Gundam Reconguista in G (Japanese: ガンダム Gのレコンギスタ, Hepburn: Gandamu Jī no Rekongisuta), also referred to as G-Reco (Gレコ), is a 2014 Japanese science fiction anime television series and the thirteenth installment in Sunrise's long-running Gundam franchise.

Created for the Gundam 35th Anniversary celebration, it is the first Gundam TV series to be written and directed by Yoshiyuki Tomino since Turn A Gundam in 1999 and features character designs by Kenichi Yoshida of Overman King Gainer and Eureka Seven fame. Airing in the MBS/TBS networks' Animeism block from October 2014 to March 2015, it is the first traditional Gundam TV series to be initially released as a late night anime. A five-part film compilation series was released from 2019 to 2022.

== Plot summary ==
In Regild Century 1014, 1,014 years after the end of the Universal Century, a young member of the Capital Guard named Bellri Zenam, charged with protecting the orbital elevator Capital Tower, encounters and helps capture a highly advanced mobile suit, the G-Self and its pilot, Aida Surugan, while defending the tower from space pirates called the Pirate Corps. Feeling a connection with both the G-Self and its pilot, Bellri is able to control the mobile suit, operable only by a select few.

The G-Self is recaptured by the Amerian spaceship Megafauna, and Bellri subsequently helps fend off attacks by the "Capital Army"—a militaristic faction from the Capital Tower advocating for rearmament, led by Colonel Cumpa Rusita—and its eccentric Captain Mask. The Megafauna returns to the Capital Territory to negotiate a ceasefire and alliance to prepare for an alleged threat from space, but the unexpected launch of an American fleet causes hostilities to resume.

The Megafauna flees to space, arriving at the holy land of Sankt Porto atop the Capital Tower, which has been occupied by Amerian forces seeking control of utilities distributed by the Capital Territory. Recognizing the growing military strength of Earth's factions, the Moon colony of Towasanga sends their Dorette Fleet to begin the "Reconguista", a recolonization of Earth. In the ensuing chaos, the Megafauna as well as a pair of American and Capital Army ships journey to the Moon.

At Towasanga, Bellri and Aida learn that they are the last surviving members of the royal Rayhunton family, sent to Earth as children to protect them from the Dorette Fleet. Seeking the truth behind the conflict, Aida commands the Megafauna to the Venus Globe colonies, the source of the Photon Batteries and other advanced technology that has led to Earth's rapid militarization. After a battle with the G-IT Corps—another faction supporting the Reconguistra—they discover Cumpa Rusita is the Towasangan who brought them to Earth and provided Earthnoids with the blueprints for spaceships and mobile suits with the intention of spurring armed conflict and strengthening the human race.

The Megafauna returns to Earth with upgraded mobile suits and finds the war has escalated further. Ameria has allied with the Dorette Fleet while Captain Mask allies with the G-IT Corps to ensure his historically oppressed race has a place in the new world order. A chaotic final battle ensues at the Guiana Highlands among the remains of the past wars and Cumpa Rusita is killed in the crossfire between Bellri and Captain Mask. Having rediscovered the horrors of war throughout their adventures, the crew of the Megafauna force a ceasefire with technology from the Universal Century.

Some months later, a joint crew of Earthnoids and Spacenoids from multiple nations start a journey around the world to promote peace and understanding. Bellri disembarks in Japan and climbs Mount Fuji, intending to see the world on his own two feet.

== Characters ==
=== Capital Army / Capital Guard / Capital Territory ===
Bellri Zenam (ベルリ・ゼナム, Beruri Zenamu)
Voiced by: Mark Ishii
A 17-year-old Capital Guard Academy cadet and the primary pilot of the YG-111 G-Self who involves himself with the Megafauna's crew. Because of the Rayhunton Code, Bellri is one of three people who can operate the G-Self, the others being Aida Surugan and Raraiya Akuparl. In truth, he is an heir to the Towasangan Rayhunton family and Aida Surugan's biological younger brother.
The YG-111 G-Self, also known as the Gundam G-Self, is a one-of-a-kind prototype mobile suit built by Towasangan rebels using the ancient Rose of Hermes Blueprints. It utilizes a unique full-body Photon Frame in its construction, which makes it more powerful and versatile than most mobile suits of the time. It can be equipped with various equipment Packs that grant it various special abilities and weapons.
Noredo Nug (ノレド・ナグ, Noredo Nagu)
Voiced by: Minako Kotobuki
A cheerleader and Bellri's childhood friend. She acts as Raraiya's caretaker and eventually co-pilots the VGGM-Gf10 G-Lucifer with her.
Nobell (ノベル, Noberu)
Voiced by: Ayahi Takagaki
Noredo's personal HAROBE-type robot, named for both Noredo and Bellri.
Raraiya Monday (ラライヤ・マンディ, Raraiya Mandy)
Voiced by: Yukari Fukui
Real name Raraiya Akuparl (ラライヤ・アクパール, Raraiya Akuparu). A Towasangan native and originally a member of the Rayhunton loyalist faction, Raraiya delivers the G-Self to Earth, but suffers from severe oxygen deprivation that afflicts her with amnesia and reverts her mind to that of a child. She eventually fully recovers her memories and faculties and becomes the co-pilot of the VGGM-Gf10 G-Lucifer alongside Noredo.
The VGGM-Gf10 G-Lucifer, also known as the Gundam G-Lucifer, is a prototype testbed mobile suit developed by Venus Globe's G-IT Laboratory. It features a unique head with a single eye camera resembling the mobile suits once used by the Principality of Zeon. It also features two seats in the cockpit, one for the primary pilot and one for a copilot in order to collect data and manage systems during testing. It is equipped with a system known as Moonlight Butterfly, which spreads nanomachines that disable and destroy technology.
Luin Lee / Mask (ルイン・リー / マスク, Ruin Rī / Masuku)
Voiced by: Takuya Satō
A Capital Guard Academy student and Bellri's classmate. Luin is a Kuntala, a lower caste of people who were once used as a food source during famines at the end of the Universal Century. Kuntala discrimination inspires him to become a symbol of his people's strength by joining the Capital Army as Captain Mask. As Captain Mask, Luin develops an open rivalry with Bellri that only intensifies as he is repeatedly defeated in battle. Pilots the CAMS-03 Elf Bullock, CAMS-05 Mack Knife, and VGGM-Git01 Kabikali.
Manny Ambassada (マニィ・アンバサダ, Manyi Anbasada)
Voiced by: Ayahi Takagaki
Luin Lee's girlfriend and fellow Kuntala. Joins the Capital Army and becomes the pilot of the G-Rach mobile armor.
Dellensen Samatar (デレンセン・サマター, Derensen Samatā)
Voiced by: Tsuyoshi Koyama
Bellri's teacher at the Capital Guard Academy.
Kerbes Yoh (ケルベス・ヨー, Kerubesu Yō)
Voiced by: Yusuke Suda
A Capital Guard Academy instructor who joins the Megafauna crew. Is implied to be attracted to Raraiya.
Wilmit Zenam (ウィルミット・ゼナム, Uirumitto Zenamu)
Voiced by: Atsuko Tanaka
Bellri's adoptive mother and Operations Director for the Capital Territory. As Operations Director, she is responsible for enforcing the SU-Cordism taboos.
Becker Shadam (ベッカー・シャダム, Bekkā Shadamu)
Voiced by: Keiji Himeno
A captain in the Capital Army. Pilots a CAMS-04 Wuxia.
Cumpa Rusita (クンパ・ルシータ, Kunpa rushīta)
Voiced by: Akio Hirose
Head of the Capital Guard's Research Division and founder of the Capital Army.
Barara Peor (バララ・ペオール, Barara Peōru)
Voiced by: Mai Nakahara
An officer in the Capital Army and Luin Lee/Captain Mask's direct subordinate, known for her distinctive earpieces that resemble rabbit's ears. Pilots the Bifron, a pink CAMS-05 Mack Knife, and the Yggdrasil mobile armor.
Gel Trimedestus Nug (ゲル・トリメデストス・ナグ, Geru Torimedesutosu Nagu)
Voiced by: Shinshū Fuji
Leader of SU-Cordism, a widespread pseudo-religion that considers the Capital Tower space elevator to be sacred. SU-Cordism also enforces a taboo that has stagnated technological advancement and maintains a monopoly on photon batteries.
Jugan Meinstron (ジュガン・マインストロン, Jugan Mainsutoron)
Voiced by: Junichi Suwabe
Birgiz Shiba (ビルギーズ・シバ, Birugīzu Shiba)
Voiced by: Hiroshi Naka

=== Amerian Army / Pirate Corps ===
Aida Surugan (アイーダ・スルガン, Aīda Surugan)
Voiced by: Yu Shimamura
A 19-year-old member of the Megafauna crew who attempts to recover the YG-111 G-Self from the Capital Guard. Primarily pilots the MSAM-033 G-Arcane, but is also one of three people able to operate the YG-111 G-Self due to the Rayhunton Code. In truth, she is Bellri's biological older sister and an heir to House Rayhunton of Towasanga.
The MSAM-033 G-Arcane, also known as the Gundam G-Arcane, was built by the Amerian Army using the Rose of Hermes Blueprints. It is capable of transforming into an aircraft mode for atmospheric flight and is armed with an anti-ship rifle. The G-Arcane is later upgraded with the Full Dress equipment, which replaces the skirt booster with a large battery pack and binders taken from the VGGM-Gb03 Gaeon's spare parts.
Gusion Surugan (グシオン・スルガン, Gushion Surugan)
Voiced by: Hiroyuki Kinoshita
Aida's adoptive father and a general in the Amerian Army.
Cahill Saint (カーヒル・セイント, Kāhiru Seinto)
Voiced by: Toshiyuki Morikawa
Aida's lover and a mobile suit pilot on the Megafauna, piloting a GH-001 Grimoire.
Klimton Nicchini / Klim Nick (クリムトン・ニッキーニ / クリム・ニック, Kurimuton Nikkīni / Kurimu Nikku)
Voiced by: Ryota Ohsaka
A 20-year-old lieutenant and mobile suit pilot in the Amerian Army. Arrogant and smug, he claims to be a genius and is considered annoying by his crewmates. Primarily pilots a blue MSAM-YM03 Montero, but also pilots a blue MSAM-034a Space Jahannam, the VGGM-La01a Dharma mobile armor, and the VGGM-La01b Dahack.
Donyell Tos (ドニエル・トス, Donieru Tosu)
Voiced by: Shinpachi Tsuji
The captain of the Megafauna.
Mick Jack (ミック・ジャック, Mikku Jakku)
Voiced by: Michiko Kaiden
A 24-year-old Amerian Army lieutenant and mobile suit pilot who frequently assists the Megafauna. Pilots a pink Hecate, the Trinity, and the Armorzagan.
Happa (ハッパ, Happa)
Voiced by: Chihiro Suzuki
A mechanic on the Megafauna.
Steer (ステア, Sutea)
Voiced by: Michelle Yumiko Payne
Megafauna's helmsperson.
Executive Officer (副長, Fukuchō)
Voiced by: Junichi Suwabe
Megafauna's XO.
Gisela (ギゼラ, Gizera)
Voiced by: Kairi Satake
Megafaunas bridge officer.
Adams Smith (アダム・スミス, Adamu Sumisu)
Voiced by: Mitsuaki Kanuka
Megafauna's deck chief.
Clem Moa (クレン・モア, Kuren Moa)
Voiced by: Itaru Yamamoto
The chief mechanic on the Megafauna.
Maki Sole (マキ・ソール, Maki Sōru)
Voiced by: Sakiko Tamagawa
A Megafauna crew member.
Jama Delia (ジャマ・デリア, Jama Deria)
Voiced by: Tomohiro Fujitaka
A Megafauna crew member.
Ressel Blanc (レッセル・ブラン, Resseru Buran)
Voiced by: Taishi Murata
A Megafauna crew member.
Annette Sora (アネッテ・ソラ, Anette Sora)
Voiced by: Miyuki Satō
A mechanic on the Megafauna.
Medi Susun (メディー・ススン, Medī Susun)
Voiced by: Junichi Suwabe
A doctor on the Megafauna.
Kiran Kim (キラン・キム, Kiran Kimu)
Voiced by: Mīna Obata
A nurse on the Megafauna.
Luan (ルアン, Ruan)
Voiced by: Yoshiaki Hasegawa
A GH-001 Grimoire pilot assigned to the Megafauna.
Oliver (オリバー, Oribā)
Voiced by: Takuya Masumoto
A GH-001 Grimoire pilot assigned to the Megafauna.
Zuchini Nicchini (ズッキーニ・ニッキーニ, Zukkīni Nikkīni)
Voiced by: Toshihiko Kojima
Klim Nick's father and the President of Ameria.

=== Towasanga ===
Noutu Dorette (ノウトゥ・ドレット, Nouto~u Doretto)
Voiced by: Ryūji Mizuno
A Towasangan general and leader of the Dorette Fleet, the leading force behind the "Reconguista."
Mashner Hume (マッシュナー・ヒューム, Masshunā Hyūmu)
Voiced by: Chiaki Takahashi
An officer in the Dorette Fleet. Implied to be romantically involved with Rockpie Getty.
Turbo Brockin (ターボ・ブロッキン, Tābo Burokkin)
Voiced by: Satoshi Taki
Commander of the Dorette Fleet.
Rockpie Getty (ロックパイ・ゲティ, Rokkupai Geti)
Voiced by: Junya Hirano
A pilot in the Dorette Fleet. Pilots a red-armed Moran and the Gaitrash.
Ringo Lon Giamanotta (リンゴ・ロン・ジャマノッタ, Ringo Ron Jamanotta)
Voiced by: Shintaro Asanuma
A Towasangan mobile suit pilot who eventually defects to the Megafauna. Frequently bickers with Kerbes Yoh because of a shared crush on Raraiya. Pilots a red Moran.
Gavan Magdala (ガヴァン・マグダラ, Gavu~an Magudara)
Voiced by: Tetsu Inada
A Towasangan mobile suit pilot. Pilots a Zacks.
Flaminia Kalle (フラミニア・カッレ, Furaminia Karre)
Voiced by: Sakiko Tamagawa
A member of the Towasangan Resistance who is actually a spy for the Venus Globe.
Lorucca Biskes (ロルッカ・ビスケス, Rorukka Bisukesu)
Voiced by: Atsuki Tani
A Towasanga Resistance mechanic who helped build the YG-111 G-Self from the Rose of Hermes Blueprints.
Miraji Barbaros (ミラジ・バルバロス, Miraji Barubarosu)
Voiced by: Hideyuki Umezu
A Towasanga Resistance mechanic who helped build the YG-111 G-Self from the Rose of Hermes Blueprints.
Jean Byeon Hazm (ジャン・ビョン・ハザム, Jan Byon Hazamu)
Voiced by: Itaru Yamamoto
Towasanga's Prime Minister.

=== Venus Globe ===
La Gu (ラ・グー, Ra Gū)
Voiced by: Takehito Koyasu
Head of the Venus Globe. Because of Venus's low gravity, his body is severely weakened and atrophied. He wears a mechanical exoskeleton to appear normal.
Elle Kind (エル・カインド, Eru Kaindo)
Voiced by: Yutaka Nakano
Captain of the Crescent Ship, which travels between the Venus Globe and Towasanga to deliver photon batteries to Earth.

=== G-IT Laboratory ===
Kia Mbeki (キア・ムベッキ, Kia Mubekki)
Voiced by: Nakai Kazuya
Director of Venus Globe's G-IT Laboratory. Pilots the Conque de Venus mobile armor and the VGGM-Gb03 Gaeon.
Chickara Dual (チッカラ・デュアル, Chikkara De~yuaru)
Voiced by: Keiko Sugiura
A G-IT Laboratory mobile suit pilot who constantly works out to counteract the Venus Sphere's low gravity. Pilots the VGGM-Sc02 Gastima.
Kun Soon (クン・スーン, Kun Sūn)
Voiced by: Ami Koshimizu
A G-IT Laboratory mobile suit pilot who is in a relationship with Kia Mbeki. Pilots the Grod mobile armor and Mazraster.
Rosenthal Kobashi (ローゼンタール・コバシ, Rōzentāru Kobashi)
Voiced by: Junichi Suwabe
A G-IT Laboratory mobile suit pilot. Pilots the Z'Gocky.
Yaan Zishar (ヤーン・ジシャール, Yān Jishāru)
Voiced by: Shintarō Asanuma

== Production ==
=== Background ===
The series began development prior to 2009, when Yoshiyuki Tomino approached character designer Kenichi Yoshida to perform preliminary design work.

The announcement was first publicized in September 2011 under the codename G-Reco. Previously, in November 2010, Tomino had previewed an unfinished novel in the 100th issue of Gundam Ace called Hajimetai Capital G no Monogatari (はじめたいキャピタルGの物語), which revolved around a space elevator with similar characters and settings. The scenario for the show was completed and the anime began full production in 2012.

Reconguista in G was officially unveiled at the Gundam 35th Anniversary event on March 20, 2014. During the unveiling, Tomino explained the "G" stands for "Gundam," but primarily means "ground." He also explained the word "reconguista" is based on the Spanish word reconquista; however, the Japanese audience prefers a voiced "g" in the title which necessitated the change.

=== Staff ===
Gundam Reconguista in G is Yoshiyuki Tomino's first major original animated work since The Wings of Rean in 2004, though he had directed a CGI short for Gundam's 30th anniversary in 2009 called Ring of Gundam. The character designs of the series are by Kenichi Yoshida, who had his first character designs credit in Tomino's Overman King Gainer. The mechanical designs are by Akira Yasuda, who previously worked with Tomino as a character designer in Turn A Gundam and mecha designer in Overman King Gainer, Kimitoshi Yamane, who also worked with Tomino in Overman King Gainer, and Ippei Gyōbu, an advertising illustrator who was working on his first mechanical designs. Yuugo Kanno is the composer of the music.

=== Short film ===
A short film with 3D CGI mecha scenes, titled From the Past to the Future, was released on May 21, 2015, featuring a battle between G-Self and G-Arcane, and the RX-0 Unicorn Gundam 03 Phenex from Mobile Suit Gundam Unicorn. The film was released at Gundam Front Tokyo's Wall-G Theater in Odaiba, Tokyo, Japan.

=== Compilation films ===
The series received five compilation films. The first film, Go! Core Fighter, premiered on November 29, 2019. The second film, Bellri's Fierce Charge, premiered on February 21, 2020. Further films were delayed due to the 2020 coronavirus pandemic. The third film, Legacy from Space, premiered on July 22, 2021. The fourth film, Love That Cries Out in Battle, premiered on July 22, 2022, and the fifth film, Beyond the Peril of Death, premiered on August 5, 2022.

== Release ==
The first three episodes were compiled for preview screenings in limited Japanese theaters starting August 23, 2014. This film was made available on the Japanese streaming website Docomo Anime Store in September 2014. The series aired in the Animeism block from October 2, 2014, to March 26, 2015, with a one-hour special of the first two episodes.

Sunrise released the series on home video (via Right Stuf Inc.) in 2016 while Anime Limited acquired the rights to release the series in Europe.

== Music ==
The first opening theme is "BLAZING" by Garnidelia, and the ending theme is "G no Senkō" by Daisuke Hasegawa.

The second opening theme is "Futari no Mahō" (ふたりのまほう) by May J.

== Related media ==
=== Manga ===
A manga adaptation of the show by Tamon Ōta was serialized in Gundam Ace magazine from October 2014 to November 2019 issues, when it went on hiatus. Five compilation volumes have been released from December 2014 to May 2017.

=== Video games ===
In Mobile Suit Gundam Extreme Vs. Force PlayStation Vita game, the G-Self is a playable unit. The Mack Knife was later included as DLC. Both of the units also appear on the Arcade Game Mobile Suit Gundam Extreme Vs. Maxi Boost ON and later supplanted by the G-Arcane with the full dress and G-Self again with the Perfect pack. In Mobile Suit Gundam Extreme Vs. 2, the Montero(Klim Nick's unit) is a playable unit and later supplanted by the G-Lucifer and the Kabakali. In Mobile Suit Gundam Extreme Vs. 2 XBoost, the G-Rach serves as a boss unit. Later, the Dahack serves as a playable unit. In Mobile Suit Gundam Extreme Vs. 2 OverBoost, the Hecate serves as a playable unit.

== Reception ==
The reaction to the series was mixed. Toshio Okada, a co-founder and former president of Gainax, has voiced concerns regarding the show's comprehensibility. He stated that "Ordinary people watch this and don't know what's happening," and "It's fine to make it for today's kids, but who does he think kids today are? Who does he think the kids that watch Yo-kai Watch are?" Lauren Orsini of Anime News Network criticized it in her review of the Gundam series as a whole. Stating "The storytelling is so confusing, it may take the entire series for you to figure out what's going on." She recommended against watching it entirely. Meanwhile, Japanese social critic and editor-in-chief of the Planets magazine, Uno Tsunehiro, gave it a highly positive critical response, stating that "[It is] in my humble opinion, this disorientation is somewhat intended... What we see here may be an intense message that goes against the times." He went on to state that it reflects the dilemmas that humanity faced in the 20th century, and how technology and digital age culture has made us lose our ability to perceive and understand these detached realities. Likewise, writer Gen Urobuchi wrote a highly positive critical response to it, stating "If there are infinite possibilities in writing, is it possible to write a story about the potential danger of stories? A story that renounces stories? Yes, it is. Reconguista of G did it", and "When I saw the end credits I was just moved, and exclaimed "They did it!" I had been worried about the limits of storytelling and was just thankful for this slap from a veteran creator to me. Reconguista of G made me happy."

In April 2015, Tomino responding to criticisms offered an apology to those who did not comprehend the story, stating, "If people tell me, 'I couldn't understand it because you aren't good at what you do,' then there's nothing for me to say but 'I'm sorry.'"

Commercially the series was a success. The limited-edition Blu-ray debuted 15th on the Oricon chart, with 3,864 units sold during the first week. The second volume of the Blu-ray debuted 4th on the Oricon chart, with 7,322 units sold in the first week. According to the Oricon chart, Gundam Reconguista in G ranked as the 22nd best selling anime of 2015 with 76,419 units sold in total.

Preceded by Mobile Suit Gundam-san	Gundam metaseries (production order); 2014–2015	Succeeded by Gundam Build Fighters Try
