= Jamileh Sadeghi =

Iranian businesswoman

Jamileh Sadeghi (born 1958) is an Iranian businesswoman. She is the CEO of a taxi service staffed with female drivers only.

== Biography ==
Sadeghi was born in Karaj, Iran. Her parents were farmers and she was one of nine children. When she was 13 her father gave her responsibility for the farm's payroll and delivery processes and paperwork. Sadeghi was educated at a religious seminary, and her first job outside the family was as the librarian of the Fatemieh Seminary in Karaj. She was later the head of visual and dramatic arts at the Islamic Culture and Guidance Bureau in Karaj, and then advisor to the governor of Karaj. She also served as secretary of the Karaj Women's Affairs Commission, resigning in 2000.

After hearing reports from women about being verbally assaulted in taxis, she decided to open an all-female taxi company. She opened the company in 2001, and in 2003 extended the service to buses driven by women.

=== Recognition ===
Sadeghi was chosen as Model Job Creator of the Year in 2003, 2006 and 2007. Her life and career are also the subject of a book, A Woman as Great as the Sky.
