= Jamileh Esfahani =

Jamileh Esfahani (Persian: جمیله اصفهانی) was a female poet in Safavid Iran who was active during the reign of Shah Abbas I (r. 1588–1629). She was a native of Isfahan or Yazd, and during her youth, married Khojeh Habibollah Tarkeh, a judge in Isfahan.

Following the death of her husband, Jamileh remained in Isfahan for a period before traveling to India, where she briefly gained access to the royal court of the Mughal emperor Akbar (r. 1556–1605). Upon returning to Isfahan, she invested the wealth gained from her Indian trip into commercial trade. During this period, she married Esmail ibn Khvajeh Mirkhan.

Jamileh was greatly praised by Ohadi Balyani, who knew her personally. Some of her quatrains have been preserved.

== Sources ==
- Sanjabi, Parisa (2019). "جمیله اصفهانی". The Great Islamic Encyclopaedia (in Persian).
