= Atsuko Enomoto =

Japanese voice actress and singer

- 榎本 温子
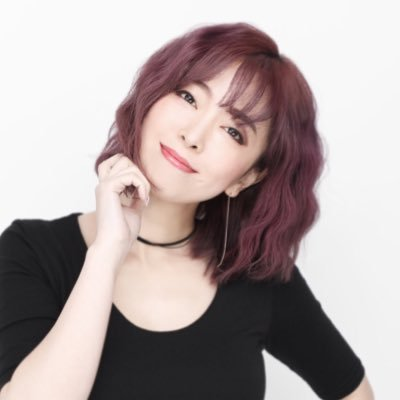
- Born: November 1, 1979 (age 46); Tokyo, Japan
- Occupations: Voice actress; singer
- Years active: 1998–present
- Spouse: Mark Ishii (m. 2016; div. 2018)
- Musical career
- Genres: J-Pop; Anison
- Instrument: Vocals
- Years active: 2001–present
- Label: Avex Trax

Atsuko Enomoto (榎本 温子, Enomoto Atsuko) is a Japanese voice actress and singer.

== Biography ==
Enomoto made her voice acting debut as Yukino Miyazawa from Kare Kano in 1998, which she auditioned for while she was still in high school. Her debut single was Be My Angel the opening theme of the 2001 anime Angelic Layer.

She was affiliated with talent agency 81 Produce until 2015. Her former husband is voice actor Mark Ishii. In 2018, she discussed harassment in the industry and how she desperately wanted to quit in her first years as a voice actress.

== Filmography ==
=== Television animation ===
Year	Title	Role	Notes
1998	Kare Kano	Yukino Miyazawa	
1999	Kaikan Phrase	Aine Yukimura	
1999	The Legend of Black Heaven	Kotoko	
1999	Steel Angel Kurumi	Kurumi	
2000	Baby Felix	Mimi	
2000	Argento Soma	Scarlet	
2000	Daa! Daa! Daa!	Aya Konishi	
2000	Platinumhugen Ordian	Nanna	
2001	Angelic Layer	Misaki Suzuhara	
2001	Captain Tsubasa: Road to 2002	Sanae Nakazawa	
2001	Chance Pop Session	Yuki Aoyama	
2001	Hikaru no Go	Asumi Nase	
2001	The SoulTaker	Megumi Akiba	
2002	.hack//SIGN	A-20	
2002	Nurse Witch Komugi	Megumi Akiba	
2002	Panyo Panyo Di Gi Charat	Rinna Charat	
2002–2003	Monkey Typhoon	Shiyon	
2003	Di Gi Charat Nyo!	Rinna Charat	
2003	Gunparade Orchestra	Tommi Fujino	
2004	Ryusei Sentai Musumet	Marcia Saotome	
2005	Glass Mask	Emi Tabuchi	
2005	Soreyuke! Gedou Otometai	Otone Hokke	
2005	Starship Operators	Akiho Maya	
2006	.hack//Roots	Bset	
2006	Bokura ga Ita	Ayaka Takeuchi	
2006	Futari wa Pretty Cure Splash Star	Mai Mishou/Cure Egret/Cure Windy (Speaking Voice)	
2006	Gintama	Otose (Young)	
2006	Gift: Eternal Rainbow	Sena Asakawa	
2006	Kagihime Monogatari Eikyuu Alice Rondo	Mika Ohgami	
2006	Clannad	Yukine Miyazawa	
2008	Gunslinger Girl -Il Teatrino-	Triela	
2009	Element Hunters	Chiara Ferina	
2011	Cardfight!! Vanguard	Emi Sendō	
2013	Line Town	Sally	
2014	Bonjour♪Sweet Love Patisserie	Tsubaki Sannomiya	
2023	Power of Hope: PreCure Full Bloom	Mai Mishou	
	Pokémon	Miki, Kurumi, Hinata	

=== Original video animation (OVA) ===
- Amon: The Darkside of The Devilman (2000) – Miki Makimura
- Puni Puni Poemy (2001; 2 episodes) – Mitsuki Aasu
- .hack//Unison (2002–2003; 3 episodes) – Mistral
- Netrun-mon (2004) – Ranna
- Cyborg 009 VS Devilman (2015) - Sachiko
- Landreaall (2017) – Ion Lucafort

=== Video games ===
- Memories Off (1999) – Karin Hanamatsuri
- Star Ocean: Till the End of Time (2003) – Sophia Esteed, Ameena Leffeld
- Tomak: Save the Earth Love Story (2003) – Evian
- Clannad Full Voice (2004) – Yukine Miyazawa
- Fire Emblem: Path of Radiance (2005) – Mist
- Summon Night EX: Thesis Yoake no Tsubasa (2005) – Ainna
- Tsukiyo ni Saraba (2005) – Alice
- .hack//G.U. (2006) – Aina
- .hack/LINK (2010) – Mistral
- Fire Emblem Heroes (2017) - Mist: Helpful Sister, Mist: Purest Spirit
- Galaxy Angel II Mugen Kairō no Kagi – Natsume Izayoi
- .Hack series – Mistral

=== Dubbing ===
Original year	Dub year	Title	Role	Original actor	Notes
1989–1991		Babar	Young Celeste	Tara Strong	
2004–2007		Drawn Together	Princess Clara	Tara Strong	
2006		High School Musical	Kelsi Nielsen	Olesya Rulin	
2007		High School Musical 2	Kelsi Nielsen	Olesya Rulin	
