= May J. =

Japanese singer and television personality (born 1988)

May J. 橋本芽生
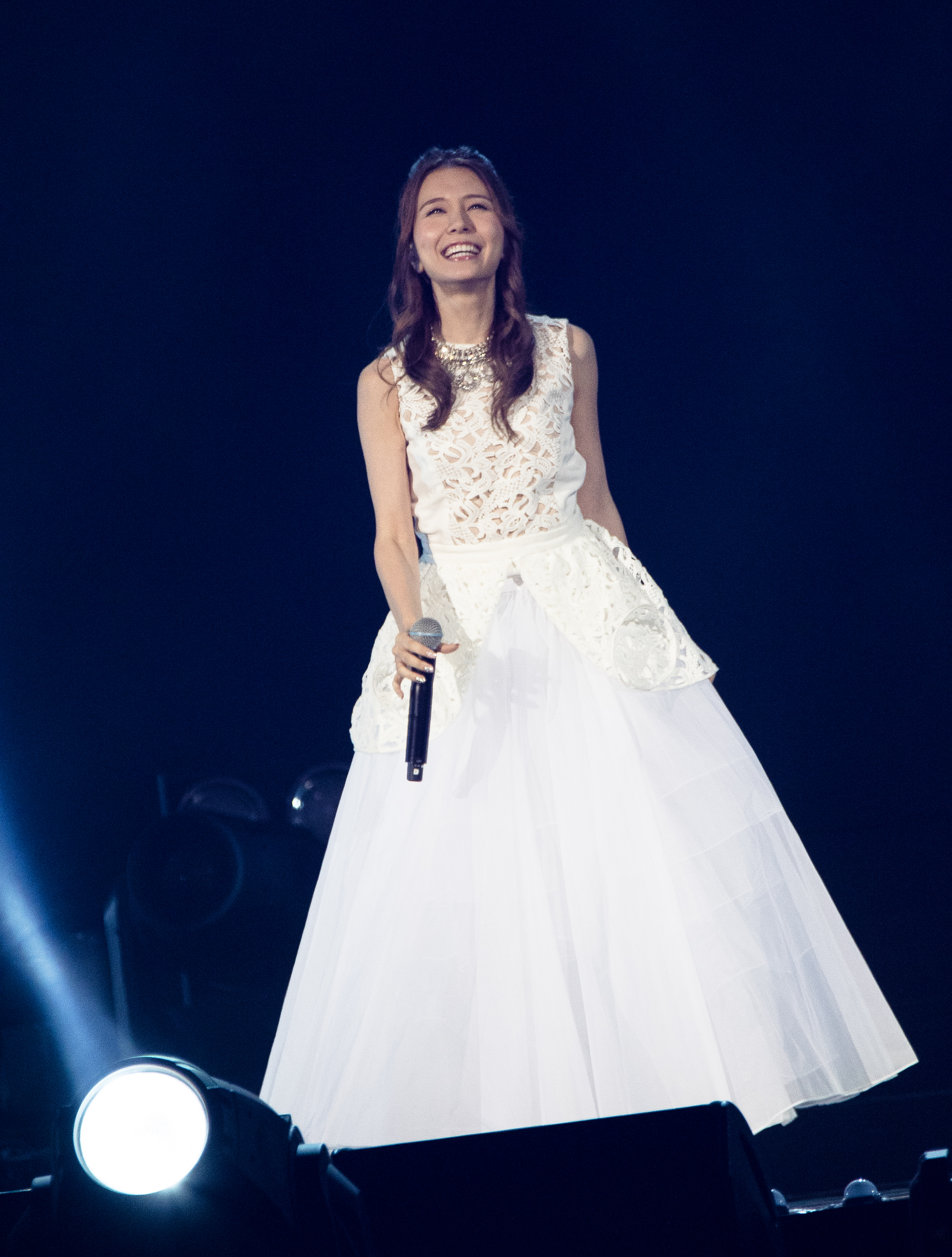
- May J. performing in 2015

Background information
- Also known as: May J.
- Born: Mei Jamileh Hashimoto; June 20, 1988 (age 38); Yokohama, Kanagawa, Japan
- Genres: Pop; R&B; Urban
- Occupations: Singer; Television host
- Years active: 2006–present
- Labels: Neosite Discs (2006–2009); Rhythm Zone (2009–present)
- Spouse: Shogen (m. 2022)
- Website: http://www.may-j.com

Mei Jamileh Hashimoto (Japanese: 橋本 芽生 Hashimoto Mei, Persian: جمیله هاشیموتو; born June 20, 1988) better known by her stage name May J., is a Japanese pop and R&B singer who made her major label debut under Sony Music Japan on July 12, 2006, with her first mini-album All My Girls. She was born to an Iranian mother and Japanese father.

== Early life ==
May J. was born as Mei Hashimoto on June 20, 1988, in Yokohama, Japan. The "J" in her name comes from the Persian name "Jamileh" (Persian: جمیله), meaning "beautiful". She is fluent in four languages, including Persian, Japanese, English and Spanish.

May J.'s Iranian mother refused to acknowledge her Persian roots due to perceived negativity towards Iranians in Japan and May J. grew up forbidden to speak the Persian language. Believing she was American, she discovered her true heritage on a chance overhearing of a conversation between her mother and grandmother. During her formative middle school years she began listening to Iranian singers Googoosh and Afshin and has later said she hopes to debut in Iran.

At the age of 14, May J. was successful at a Sony Music Japan audition and soon signed onto Sony Music. While waiting to make her major label debut, May J. was a dancer for Aaron Carter's Japanese concert and was featured on the track Luyva: Another Episode from Sphere of Influence's album Big Deal, credited simply as May.

A childhood fan of Christina Aguilera and Whitney Houston she then came to admire Canadian rock singer Avril Lavigne, winning a MTV lookalike contest as Avril. She began listening to R&B while studying at the American School in Japan, from which she graduated in 2007 following a period of balancing her studies and her singing career.

== Career ==
=== 2006–2009: Debut and development ===
Released July 12, 2006, under Neosite Discs, the hip-hop division of Sony's Ki/oon Records, the music of her debut mini-album All My Girls was billed by her label as "Jennifer Lopez/Beyoncé style music which has never before existed in Japan."

To celebrate the 10 year anniversary of Neosite Discs, the single "I Say Yeah!" was released on October 4, 2006, as a collaboration by all 5 of the label's signed artists. The single marked May J.'s first appearance in the Oricon top 10.

May J. performed as the opening act for American R&B singer Cassie alongside Rōma Tanaka at Cassie's concert at Shibuya O-EAST on November 28, 2006. December 20, 2006, saw May J.'s first solo single release when "Here We Go feat. Verbal (M-Flo)" dropped and charted at #70 on the weekly charts.

Her follow-up single, "Dear…" was released on May 30, 2006, and was unlike most of her previous work. Despite the ballad being much more Japanese-friendly than her debut, the single charted at just #90. May J. was then featured on Hip-Hop artist Zeebra's new album World of Music on the track "Shinin' Like a Diamond". In October, it was announced that May J. would be releasing her 3rd single, "Do tha' Do tha'" on November 21, followed shortly by her first full-length studio album, Baby Girl on December 5.

In October 2008, she became the co-host of NHK's English-language weekly music program J-Melo, with Shanti Snyder, going out to 180 countries via NHK World. She became sole host in March 2010 and stayed as the host through March 2026.

=== 2009–present: Rise to prominence ===
On March 6, 2009, label Rhythm Zone opened a new official site for May J. confirming that she had left Sony to join the Avex imprint. On the May 23, 2009, her second album Family was announced, featuring the single Garden (featuring DJ Kaori, Diggy-MO', クレンチ＆ブリスタ). The album charted at #4 on the Oricon Weekly Albums Chart.

Her third full album titled For You was released on February 17, 2010. Her first solo live tour, lasting ten weeks and including 40 shows followed, culminating at Tokyo's Shibuya AX venue on May 23, 2010.

On November 24, 2010, she released a mini-album titled Believin... as a prelude to her fourth full album Colors, released on January 26, 2011.

In 2012, May J. recorded the song "Back to Your Heart" with Canadian singer Daniel Powter.

May J. sang the end roll version of the title song "Let It Go" in Disney's Japanese release of the Frozen animated movie which hit No. 8 on the Japan Hot 100 after the film's Japanese release in March 2014. In 2018, she performed the song live in the finale of the touring ice show Fantasy on Ice in Makuhari and Kanazawa.

May J. has appeared on the variety show Kanjani8 no Shiwake Eight since 2012, as part of a karaoke contest segment, winning 26 straight contests before losing to Sarah Àlainn with the Idina Menzel version of "Let It Go", on the May 3, 2014, edition.

== Personal life ==
On June 20, 2022, May J. announced that she has married actor Shogen. On May 13, 2023, May J announced that she and her husband are expecting their first child. May J. announced on March 16, 2023, through a post on Instagram that she had given birth to her first child. The specific date of birth of the child was not disclosed.

== Discography ==
=== Studio albums ===
List of studio albums, with selected chart positions and sales
Album information	Chart position	First week sales (Oricon)	Copies sold (Oricon)
Album information	JPN	First week sales (Oricon)	Copies sold (Oricon)
Baby Girl: Released: December 5, 2007	50	4,110	12,078
Family: Released: May 27, 2009	4	26,662	94,848
For You: Released: February 17, 2010	9	10,976	30,334
Colors: Released: January 26, 2011	23	4,547	8,243
Secret Diary: Released: January 25, 2012	35	3,105	5,140
Brave: Released: December 5, 2012	57	2,585	3,331
Imperfection: Released: October 1, 2014	3	16,799	39,917
Futuristic: Released: October 25, 2017	24	3,128	3,984
Silver Lining: Released: December 8, 2021	54		
Bittersweet Song Covers: Released: November 9, 2022	39	1,130	

=== Singles ===
Title	Release date	Peak chart positions		Copies sold (Oricon)
Title	Release date	Oricon	Japan Hot 100	Copies sold (Oricon)
I Say Yeah!	October 4, 2006	8	×	-
Here We Go (featuring Verbal)	December 20, 2006	70	×	3,865
Dear...	May 30, 2007	97	×	1,758
Do tha' Do tha	November 21, 2007	—	×	-
Shiny Sky	June 9, 2010	54	41	2,144
Rewind	October 10, 2012	30	47	2,638
Hontou no Koi	September 10, 2014	6	6	23,378
ReBirth(Faith)	February 25, 2015	11	26	15,338
Sparkle	August 5, 2015	22	—	6,093
Have Dreams!	August 3, 2016	28	64	3,733
Haha to Musume no 10,000 Nichi ~Mirai no Tobira~	May 24, 2017	55	—	2,302
Kizuna Infinity / Hero	March 7, 2018	—	—	
"—" denotes releases that did not chart or were not released in that region. "×" denotes periods where charts did not exist or were not archived.

=== Extended plays ===
Album #	Album information	Chart position	Debut Week Sales (Oricon)	Sold Copies (Oricon)
Album #	Album information	JPN	Debut Week Sales (Oricon)	Sold Copies (Oricon)
1st	"All My Girls ": Released: July 12, 2006	85	2,097	9,432
2nd	"Believin'... ": Released: November 24, 2010	42	2,819	4,424
3rd	"Love Ballad": Released: October 23, 2013	6	18,773	50,599
4th	"Christmas Songs": Released: November 16, 2016	22	4,283	7,551

=== Best albums ===
Album #	Album information	Chart position	Debut Week Sales (Oricon)	Sold Copies (Oricon)
Album #	Album information	JPN	Debut Week Sales (Oricon)	Sold Copies (Oricon)
1st	"With ~Best Collaboration Non-Stop DJ Mix~" (Collaboration Mix Album): Released: April 27, 2011	95		
2nd	"Don't Stop! Summer Best!" (Rental Album): Released: August 8, 2012	7	10,684	62,409
3rd	"May J. Best - Selected Edition -" (iTunes Exclusive Digital Album): Released: January 30, 2013	—		
4th	"May J. BEST -7 Years Collection-": Released: February 6, 2013	13	7,935	44,349
5th	"Selected Ballads" (Digital Album): Released: August 21, 2013	—		
6th	"Ballad Best '09~'13" (Rental Album): Released: September 27, 2013	—		
7th	"mu-mo Gentai May J. 2013 Summer Best 3" (mumo Exclusive Digital Album): Released: September 30, 2013	—		
8th	"mu-mo Gentei ☆May J. 2013 SUMMER BEST 6" (mumo Exclusive Digital Album): Released: September 30, 2013	—		
9th	"May J. W BEST -Original & Covers-": Released: January 1, 2015	7	10,684	62,409
10th	"Best of Duets": Released: March 29, 2017	30	2,839	3,519
11th	"May J. W BEST 2 -Original & Covers-": Released: January 1, 2021	84		

=== Cover albums ===
Album #	Album information	Chart position	Debut Week Sales (Oricon)	Sold Copies (Oricon)
Album #	Album information	JPN	Debut Week Sales (Oricon)	Sold Copies (Oricon)
1st	"Summer Ballad Covers": Released: June 19, 2013	4	46,418	203,186
2nd	"Heartful Song Covers": Released: March 26, 2014	2	29,375	245,473
3rd	"May J. sings Disney": Released: November 4, 2015	6	9,006	22,981
4th	"Sweet Song Covers": Released: March 16, 2016	6	8,168	15,037
5th	"Cinema Song Covers" (Standart Album, English Album and Instrumental Album): Released: July 25, 2018	29		
6th	"Heisei Love Song Covers Supported by DAM" (Standart Version and Karaoke Version): Released: April 17, 2019	24		

=== Live albums ===
Album #	Album information	Chart position	Debut Week Sales (Oricon)	Sold Copies (Oricon)
Album #	Album information	JPN	Debut Week Sales (Oricon)	Sold Copies (Oricon)
1st	"May J. Live Autumn Tour 2013 ~Best & Covers~" (Rental Album): Released: July 2, 2014	—		
2nd	"Budokan Live 2015 ~Live to the Future~" (Rental Album): Released: March 30, 2016	—		
3rd	"10th Anniversary Tour 2016 @ Nakano Sun Plaza 2016.7.3" (Fanclub Limited Album): Released: October 25, 2017	—		
4th	"10th Anniversary Grand Finale ~The Request Live~ @ Orchard Hall 2016.10.9" (Fanclub Limited Album): Released: October 25, 2017	—		
5th	"Tour 2017 ~ME, MYSELF & OUR MUSIC~ "Futuristic" @ Hitomi Kinen Koudou 2017.7.3" (Fanclub Limited Album): Released: October 25, 2017	—		
6th	"Billboard Classics May J. Premium Concert 2017 ~Me, Myself & Orchestra~" (Digital Album): Released: July 25, 2018	—		

=== Video albums ===
Album #	Album information	Chart position	Debut Week Sales (Oricon)	Sold Copies (Oricon)
Album #	Album information	JPN	Debut Week Sales (Oricon)	Sold Copies (Oricon)
1st	"Baby Girl Clips" (PV collection DVD): Released: January 30, 2008	297		
2nd	"Budokan Live 2015 ~Live to the Future~": Released: August 19, 2015	28		
3rd	"May J. BEST LIVE DVD BOOK": Released: June 7, 2018	—		

=== As featured artist ===
- May 27, 2009 - "Unchain my Heart" by WISE feat. May J. (in album Love Quest)
- December 15, 2010 - "HeartBeat" by TARO SOUL & KEN THE 390 feat. May J. (in album So Much Soul)
- May 16, 2012 - "REBIRTH-DAY SONG" by Demon Kakka feat. May J. (in album MYTHOLOGY)
- October 24, 2012 - "who.am.i.?" by Bentley Jones feat. May J. and Curtis Young (in album UPGRADE 1.0)
- March 12, 2013 - "Sweet Spot" by Flo Rida featuring May J.
- November 27, 2015 - "北極星" by Show Luo - 羅志祥 feat. May J. - 橋本芽生
- April 2017 - Jun. K (from 2PM) - 私たちの別れた話 (Duet with May J.)
