= All My Girls =

EP by May J.
- Released: July 12, 2006
- Genre: R&B
- Length: 29:53
- Label: Ki/oon, Neosite Discs

May J. chronology
All My Girls (2006)	Baby Girl (2007)

All My Girls is the first major label release and first mini-album by Japanese R&B singer May J. Despite not gaining public interest in Japan, as reflected by its debut at #85 on the Oricon charts, the album was generally well received by Western fans.

== Promotion ==
Unlike most album releases in Japan (and even most mini-albums), All My Girls was released without any singles to garner interest. Two PV's were released for album tracks in order to promote the album, with the music video for "My Girls" being released before the record's release and the video for "Baby Eyes(Ma$amatixxx Reggae Mix)", a remix of "Baby Close Your Eyes" featuring Ken-U, screening sometime after. However, music videos do not generate the same amount of promotion in Japan as they do in the West, with the majority of album and single promotion coming from live performances on one of Japan's many music variety programs. The fact that May J. only made one such appearance, performing "My Girls" on Music Fighter (where it was also the ending theme) is perhaps reason enough why this album debuted some 80 spots below more established artists who appear on up to 5 or more different television shows.

== Track listing ==
1. "My Girls" (Cheryl Lynn, David Paich, David Foster, May J., H.U.B., Icedown) – 3:59
2. "Million Wayz" (May J.) – 3:29
3. "Baby Close Your Eyes" (May J.) – 4:31
4. "Good Tymez" (May J.) – 4:20
5. "Destination" (May J., H.U.B.) – 4:16
6. "Thanx" (May J., H.U.B.) – 4:56
7. "Baby Eyes (Ma$amatixxx Dancehall Mix)feat.Ken-U" (May J., Ken-U) – 4:22

== Charts ==
Oricon Sales Chart (Japan)

Release	Chart	Peak position	First week sales	Sales total
July 12, 2006	Oricon Weekly Singles Chart	85	2,097	9,432
