= Jamila =

- Pronunciation: Arabic: [dʒaˈmiːla]
- Gender: 787-9

Origin
- Meaning: "Beautiful"

Other names
- Related names: Jamil

Jamila (Arabic: جميلة) is a feminine given name of Arabic origin. It is the feminine form of the masculine Arabic given name Jamil, which comes from the Arabic word jamāl (Arabic: جَمَال), meaning beautiful. The name is popular on a global scale, in regular use by both Arabic speaking and non–Arabic speaking populations and holds religious significance for some Muslims. Due to differences in transcription, there are several variations on how to spell the name.

== Popularity ==
According to the Social Security Administration, the name Jamila was among the 1,000 most popular names for baby girls in the United States from 1974 until 1995, with the exception of the year 1985. Its popularity peaked in 1977, when it was the 486th most popular name for baby girls.

== Variations ==
- Cemile (Turkish)
- Cəmilə (Azerbaijani)
- Djamila, Djemila (Algerian Arabic: جميلة)
- Džemila (Bosnian)
- Dzhamilja (Russian: Джамиля)
- Gamila (Egyptian Arabic: جميلة)
- Giamila (Italian)
- Jameela, Jameelah, Jamie Jamila, Jamilla, Jamillah, Jemila, Jemilah, Jemilla, Jemillah, Jemileh, Jemilleh, Mila, Milla, Millie, Milly (English)
- Jamira (Japanese: ジェミラ), Jamīra (Japanese: ジェミーラ)
- Jamila, Jamileth, Jamilex, Jamillette, Yamila, Yamile, Yamilé, Yamilet, Yamileth, Yamilex (Spanish)
- Qamile, Xhemile (Albanian)

== People ==
=== Sports ===
- Cemile Timur (born 1988), Turkish former football player, referee and current team manager
- Djamila Rakhmatova (born 1990), Uzbekistani rhythmic gymnast
- Jamila Wideman (born 1975), American basketball player and daughter of John Edgar Wideman
- Yamila Badell (born 1996), Uruguayan soccer player
- Yamila Hernández (born 1992), Cuban volleyball player
- Yamila Nizetich (born 1989), Argentina volleyball player
- Yamila Zambrano (born 1986), Cuban judoka
- Yamile Fors Guerra (born 1977), Cuban tennis player
- Yamilé Martínez (born 1970), Cuban basketball player
- Yamilet Peña (born 1992), Dominican artistic gymnast
- Jamila Jaxaliyeva (born 1990), Kazakh golfer

=== Arts and entertainment ===
- Djemila Benhabib (born 1972), Ukrainian-born Canadian journalist and writer
- Jameela Jamil (born 1986), British television presenter and model
- Jamila Afghani (born 1974), Afghan activist and feminist
- Jamila Cholimbo (born 1982), American singer-songwriter better known as Mila J
- Jamila Gavin (born 1941), Indian-born British writer and mother-in-law of Dido
- Jamila Massey (born 1934), Indian-born British actress and writer
- Jamila Mohammed (born 1972), Nigerian-born British singer-songwriter better known as Jamila Jemstone
- Jamila Mujahed, Afghan journalist
- Jamila Velazquez (born 1995), American singer and actress
- Jamila Woods (born 1989), American singer-songwriter and poet
- Jamilah Kolocotronis (née Linda Kolocotronis) (1956–2013), American writer
- Jamilah Lemieux (born 1984), American editor
- Jamilah Tangaza (born 1971), Nigerian journalist
- Jamileh Sheykhi (1930–2001), Iranian actress and mother of Atila Pesyani
- Jamilah Sabur (born 1987), Jamaican-born visual artist
- Jamillah Ross, Canadian comedian and singer-songwriter
- Jamillah Knowles, Australian journalist better known as Jemimah Knight
- Jamillette Gaxiola (born 1989), Mexican beauty queen who represented Cuba in Miss Earth 2009
- Yamila Cafrune (born 1965), Argentine folk singer
- Yamila Diaz-Rahi (born 1976), Argentine model

=== Politics ===
- Cemile Giousouf (born 1978), Turkish-German politician
- Jamila Gilani (born 1960), Pakistani politician and leader of the Pashtun Tahafuz Movement
- Djamila Bouhired (born 1935), Algerian nationalist
- Jamila Abdallah Taha al-Shanti (1955–2023), Palestinian politician
- Jamila Madeira (born 1975), Portuguese politician
- Jamila Abubakar Sadiq Malafa (born 1965), Nigerian international maritime lawyer and the first female Commodore in the history of the Nigerian Navy
- Jamilah Nasheed (née Jenise Williams, born 1972), American politician
- Jamila Schäfer (born 1993), German politician

=== Religion ===
- Jamila bint Thabit (née Asiya), companion of Muhammad and wife of Umar
- Jamilah bint Adwan (180-??), ancestor of Muhammad

=== Royalty and Nobility ===
- Cemile Sultan (1843–1915), Ottoman princess and issue of Abdulmejid I
- Jamila "Sarah" Ashley-Cooper, Dowager Countess of Shaftesbury (née Jamila M'Barek, born 1961), French murderer and widow of Anthony Ashley-Cooper, 10th Earl of Shaftesbury

== Places ==
- Djémila, a city in Algeria, formerly known as Cuicul.

== Fictional characters ==
- Jameela, a character in the Geo Entertainment comedic drama Yeh Zindagi Hai
- Jamila, a fashion doll marketed to children in the Middle East, similar to Barbie and Fulla
- Jamila, character in Lego Friends
- Jamila, a monster in Ultraman
- Jamila Inzamam, a character in the BBC soap opera EastEnders, played by Sara Aisha Kent.
- Jamila Ranjha, the female Indian student in Mind Your Language, played by Jamila Massey
- Jamilah Malik, a character in the BBC Scotland soap opera River City, played by Laxmi Kathuria
- Jemilla, a character in the musical Firebringer, portrayed by Meredith Stepien
- Yamila "Yam" Sanchez, a character in Soy Luna

== Films and television ==
- Jamila, the Algerian, a 1958 Egyptian film based on the life of Djamila Bouhired.
