= Cemil =

Cemil is a Turkish given name and is derived from Arabic Jamil with other Arabic variants Gamil (mainly in Egypt), Djemil (mainly in North African countries) and Djamil.

The feminine equivalent is Cemile (derived from Arabic Jamila and its Arabic variants Gamila and Djemila).

== People with the name ==
- Cemil Ağacıkoğlu (born 1959), Turkish photographer, writer and film director
- Cemil Aghamaliyev (born 1974), Azerbaijani chess grandmaster
- Cemil Aksu (born 1977), Turkish journalist, ecologist and Armenian activist
- Cemil Bayik (born 1951), founding member and a leader of the Kurdish separatist organization PKK
- Cemil Bilsel (1879–1949), Turkish politician, lawyer and academic
- Cemil Cahit Güzelbey (1908–1995), Turkish lawyer, writer and sociologist
- Cemil Cahit Toydemir (1883–1956), officer of the Ottoman Army and the general of the Turkish Army
- Cemil Can Ali Marandi (born 1998), Turkish chess grandmaster
- Cemil Cem (1882–1950), Turkish diplomat, cartoonist and journalist
- Cemil Çiçek (born 1946), Turkish politician and Deputy Prime Minister of Turkey
- Cemil Çıpa (born 1988), Turkish racecar driver
- Cemil Conk (1873–1963), officer of the Ottoman Army and the general of the Turkish Army
- Cemil Gülbaş (born 1980), Turkish chess player
- Cemil Gürgen Erlertürk (1919–1970), Turkish footballer and seaplane pilot
- Cemil İpekçi (born 1948), Turkish fashion designer
- Cemil Mengi (born 1986), Turkish-German soccer player
- Cemil Meriç (1916–1987), Turkish writer and translator
- Cemil Özbal (1908–1980), Turkish musician and doctor
- Cemil Ozyurt (born 1976), Turkish journalist
- Cemil Sait Barlas (1905–1964), Turkish politician, journalist and judge
- Cemil Sarıbacak (born 1927), Turkish wrestler
- Cemil Şeboy (born 1953), Turkish politician
- Cemil Topuzlu (1866–1958), Turkish surgeon
- Cemil Tosun (born 1987), Turkish-Austrian soccer player
- Cemil Tugay (born 1967), Turkish medical surgeon and politician
- Cemil Turan (born 1947), Turkish soccer player
- Cemil Usta (1951–2003), Turkish footballer

== Middle name ==
- Dino Cemil Bey (1894–1972), Albanian politician and diplomat
- Hasan Cemil Çambel (1879–1967), Turkish politician and historian
- İrvin Cemil Schick (born 1955), Turkish intellectual and historian of early Islam
- Mehmed Cemil Bey (1818–1872), Ottoman diplomat
- Mehmet Cemil Uybadın (1880–1957), Turkish politician and army officer
- Tamburi Cemil Bey (1873–1916), Turkish musician

== People with the surname ==
- Mesut Cemil (1902–1963), Turkish composer, and tanbur and cello player
- Yakub Cemil (1883–1916), Ottoman soldier and revolutionary
- Zaharya Efendi Mir Cemil (died 1740), Turkish classical composer

== See also ==
- Cemil Meriç, Ümraniye, neighborhood in Istanbul
- Cemil Topuzlu Open-Air Theatre (Turkish: Cemil Topuzlu Harbiye Açık Hava Tiyatrosu), a contemporary amphitheatre located in the Harbiye neighborhood of İstanbul, Turkey
- Cemal
- Gamil (disambiguation)
- Jamil
