= Gamil (name) =

Gamil is the Egyptian pronunciation of the masculine given name Jamil.

It is also a family name.

== People with this given name ==
- Gamil Agamaliev (born 1974), Azerbaijani chess grandmaster
- Marc Lépine (born as Gamil Rodrigue Liass Gharbi; 1964–1989), Canadian mass murderer
- Gamil Ratib (1926–2018), Egyptian actor

== People with this family name ==
- Sanaa Gamil (1932–2002), Egyptian actress
- Soliman Gamil (1924–1994), Egyptian composer and qanun player

== See also ==
- Gamil (disambiguation)
- Cemal
- Cemil
- Jamal
- Gamal (disambiguation)
- Jamila
