= List of people from Gaziantep =

This is a list of notable people from Gaziantep, Turkey.

- Ülkü Tamer - poet and journalist
- Seza Kutlar Aksoy - children's literature writer
- Kemal Aslan - footballer
- Abdullah Atalar - scientist
- Babken I of Cilicia - Armenian Catholicos Coadjutor
- Şahin Bey - war hero; the Şahinbey borough is named after him
- Mustafa Ferit Arsan - one of the leaders of the Turkish militia in the Siege of Aintab
- Murat Ceylan - footballer
- Kenan Doğulu - singer
- Mehmet Görmez - head of the Religious Affairs Directorate
- Ebru Gündeş - musician
- Nedim Gürsel - writer
- Asım Güzelbey - mayor of Gaziantep
- Aram Karamanoukian - Syrian Armenian military general
- Hazal Kaya - actress
- Onat Kutlar - writer, poet
- Kamil Ocak - politician
- Yılmaz Onay - director
- Kadri Pasha - Ottoman Grand Vizier, 1880
- Nurullah Sağlam - footballer
- Luther George Simjian - Armenian American inventor
- Simon Simonian - Armenian author, poet
- Sinan Tuzcu - actor
- Ahmet Ümit - writer, poet
- Necdet Yaşar - musician
- Cemil Cahit Güzelbey, author
