= Scan2Go =

Television program

- Created by: d-rights NewBoy
- Written by: Katsumi Hasegawa
- Directed by: Mitsuo Hashimoto; Chan-Young Park
- Theme music composer: John Mitchell; Tom Keenlyside; David Iris
- Opening theme: "Never Give Up"
- Ending theme: "I Will Find a Way"
- Composer: Anitunes Music
- Countries of origin: South Korea; Japan; United Arab Emirates
- Original languages: Japanese; Korean; English; Arabic
- No. of seasons: 1
- No. of episodes: 52 (list of episodes)

Production
- Executive producers: Daizo Suzuki; Manar Tarabichi; Mohammed Tarabichi; Jinwon Kim; Tommy Kim
- Producer: Rika Sasaki
- Cinematography: Yuya Kumazawa
- Editors: Keiko Onodera; Jong Hun Hong
- Running time: 30 minutes
- Production companies: d-rights Synergy SP; Newboy; SBS Contents Hub; Stonebridge Capital

Original release
- Network: SBS (South Korea)
- Release: August 9, 2010 – March 29, 2011

Scan2Go (Japanese: ギャラクシーレーサースキャン2ゴー, Hepburn: Gyarakushī Rēsā Sukyan Tu Gō; lit. "Galaxy Racer Scan2Go!!") is an animated series co-produced by d-rights, NewBoy, SBS Productions Inc. and Stonebridge Capital Inc., under the direction of Mitsuo Hashimoto. The series is set in a futuristic universe of races involving the use of miniature automated toy cars. The TV animation lasts for 52 episodes and is targeted to boys from 4 to 13 years old. It was announced in 2008 as an international co-production between Japan and Dubai. The series has been licensed by Cookie Jar Entertainment for North and South American audiences and dubbed by Ocean Productions and Blue Water Studios. In the United States, the series premiered September 1, 2012, on Cartoon Network. While the last 7 episodes have not been shown in the United States, all 52 episodes have been broadcast on YTV and Pop Max, and are also airing on K2 In Italy. In Indonesia, Scan2Go has also been broadcast on Indosiar.

== Synopsis ==
The animated television series is set within a futuristic universe, populated by an array of species from different galaxies. These species engage in a widely celebrated racing activity known as Scan2Go. Central to this activity are miniature, automated toy cars that race autonomously. These cars are controlled using special cards that provide power-ups and turboboosts to enhance their performance. Scan2Go races are characterized as one-lap sprint competitions conducted on large-scale tracks. Success in these races hinges on speed and strategic manoeuvring, with racers required to adeptly navigate a variety of obstacles, some of which may pose significant challenges or hazards. The format of Scan2Go races varies, with some conducted as team efforts, while others are free-for-all competitions.

In the narrative of "Scan2Go," the central figure is Kaz Gordon, a youthful protagonist leading the 'Team Jet,' initially known as the 'Junior Earth Team.' Kaz begins his journey in Scan2Go racing from Earth, a planet not yet enamored with the Scan2Go trend. His ambition is to rise to prominence as the preeminent Scan2Go racer. While his primary goal is to achieve unparalleled success in racing across the universe, Kaz's journey is also marked by the forging of new friendships in his quest for glory.

The storyline intensifies with the introduction of Ryu Kaizel, a formidable adversary and principal antagonist. Kaizel is notorious for dismantling the Scan2Go committee and harbours ambitions to manipulate the negative emotions of humanity, ultimately aiming at the annihilation of the Universe. This conflict forms a pivotal element of the plot, adding depth to Kaz's journey.

== Merchandise ==
=== Toy ===
Scan2Go consists of a car and two types of cards, the power card and the turbo card. There are 20 Scan2Go cars which come in a variety of models, each associated with a character in the story.

=== Innovate Technology ===
The Innovate technology allows a player to program the car to activate power turbo sequences during the race.

- Power Cards (12 levels)

Determines how strong the turbo engine boosts up. Each of the 12 cars has 12 different design for the power cards. Each of the designs reflects different power level.

- Turbo Cards (6 levels)

Determines how many times the turbo engine boosts up. There are six levels of turbo cards for each of the 12 cars.

== Music ==
All music and sound-score composed, performed and produced by John Mitchell and Tom Keenlyside at Anitunes Music Inc.

== Main characters ==
=== English ===
Character	Cast
Kaz Gordon	Tim Hamaguich/James Beach
Fiona Ryder	Michelle Molineux
Myron Seagram	Leah Dubbin-Steckel
Diego Montana	Joel Crichton
Shiro Sutherland	Will Wood
Dradd	Brendan Hunter
Hebina	Carol-Anne Day
Kraken	William Scott
Antares	Lucas Gilbertson
Jack	Ethan Cole
Taiga	Paul Hudson
Ryu Kaizel	Jonathan Love

=== Japanese ===
Character	Cast
Kazuya Daidou (大堂カズヤ)	Mana Hirata (平田真菜)
Futaba Morishima (守嶋フタバ)	Mai Nakahara (中原麻衣)
Mitsuki Kaibara (海原ミツキ)	Kaoru Mizuhara (水原薫)
Daigo Takayama (高山ダイゴ)	Kouta Sato (佐藤広太)
Shirou Shibakusa (芝草シロー)	Sōichirō Hoshi (保志総一朗)
Dradd (ドラッド)	Hiroki Yasumoto (安元洋貴)
Hebina (ヘビーナ)	Risa Mizuno (水野理紗)
Kraken (クラーケン)	Binbin Takaoka (高岡瓶々)
Antares (アンタレス)	Mitsuki Saiga (斎賀みつき)
Jack (ジャック)	Anri Katsu (勝杏里)
Taiga (タイガ)	Satoshi Tsuruoka (鶴岡聡)
Ryu (リュウ)	Tatsuhisa Suzuki (鈴木達央)

== Other characters ==
- Monkey: Member of Team Dradd.
- Utan: Member of Team Dradd.
- Pansy: Member of Team Dradd.
- Dile: Coach of Gurao.
- Kohebiko: Member of the Space Pirates.
- Daijako: Member of the Space Pirates.
- Ray: Coach of Team J.E.T.
- System P.E.L.: Member of Team J.E.T.
- Tsukikage: Member of Team J.E.T.
- Toto: Fiona's pet.
- DJ: The commentator/announcer.
- Master Hipopo: He is a Scan2Go teacher.
- Titi: She is a very little-kiddish cat-girl pop idol.
- Chacha: Titi's manager & cat-girl.
- Barry, Garry and Jerry: The Eternally Passionate Guys.

== Staff ==
- Series Original Plan: NewBoy, d-rights
- Executive Producers: Daizo Suzuki, Manar Tarabichi, Mohammed Tarabichi, Jinwon Kim, Tommy Kim
- Planning/Observer: Hamook Sung
- Directors: Mitsuo Hashimoto, Chan Young Park
- Assistant Director: Taiji Kawanishi
- Series Composition: Katsumi Hasegawa
- Character Designs: Yoshihiro Nagamori, Jong Sik Nam
- Character Design Assistant: Akiko Sato
- Machine Design: Ikuro Ishihara
- Race Planner: Issei Kume
- Art Directors: Nobuhito Sakamoto, Hoy-young Lee
- Color Supervisor: Chiho Nakamura
- Director of Photography: Yuya Kumazawa
- CG Director: Tomohiko Kan
- CG: Nam Suk Yun
- Editor: Keiko Onodera
- Sound Director: Hozumi Goda
- Music: Ocean Group, Meridian Entertainment Ltd.
- Composition Management: Masako Uchiura
- Associate Producer: Masataka Katagiri
- Animation Producers: Atsushi Tanaka, Kum Nam Cho (eps 1-18) (credited as Kun Nam Cho) → Ha Maria (eps 19-52)
- Assistant Producers: Hajime Watanabe, Saori Nakamura, Seung Won Nam
- Producer: Rika Sasaki
- General Producers: Takamoto Miura, Nabil Madi, Hamook Sung, Jiwoong Park
- Animation Studio: SynergySP
- Produced by d-rights, NewBoy, SBS Contents Hub, Stonebridge Capital

== International Broadcast ==
Country/Region	Channel
South Korea	SBS; Champ TV; Cartoon Network; Nickelodeon
Japan	Syndication
United States	Cartoon Network
Canada	YTV
(United Kingdom) UK (Republic of Ireland) Ireland	Kix
France; Switzerland; Luxembourg	Canal J Gulli
Belgium	2BE
Italy	K2
Spain	Clan TVE
Portugal	Canal Panda
Malaysia	Disney XD; TV9
Indonesia	Indosiar
Hong Kong; Macau	TVB Kids; TVB Jade
Taiwan	YOYO TV
Philippines	Cartoon Network; GMA Network
Arab League	Spacetoon
India; Nepal; Bhutan; Sri Lanka; Pakistan	Pogo
Mauritius	MBC 1
Russia	TNT; 2×2
Mongolia	Channel 25
Papua New Guinea	EM TV
Estonia	Eesti Televisioon
