= Treaty of Paris (1856) =

1856 treaty ending the Crimean War

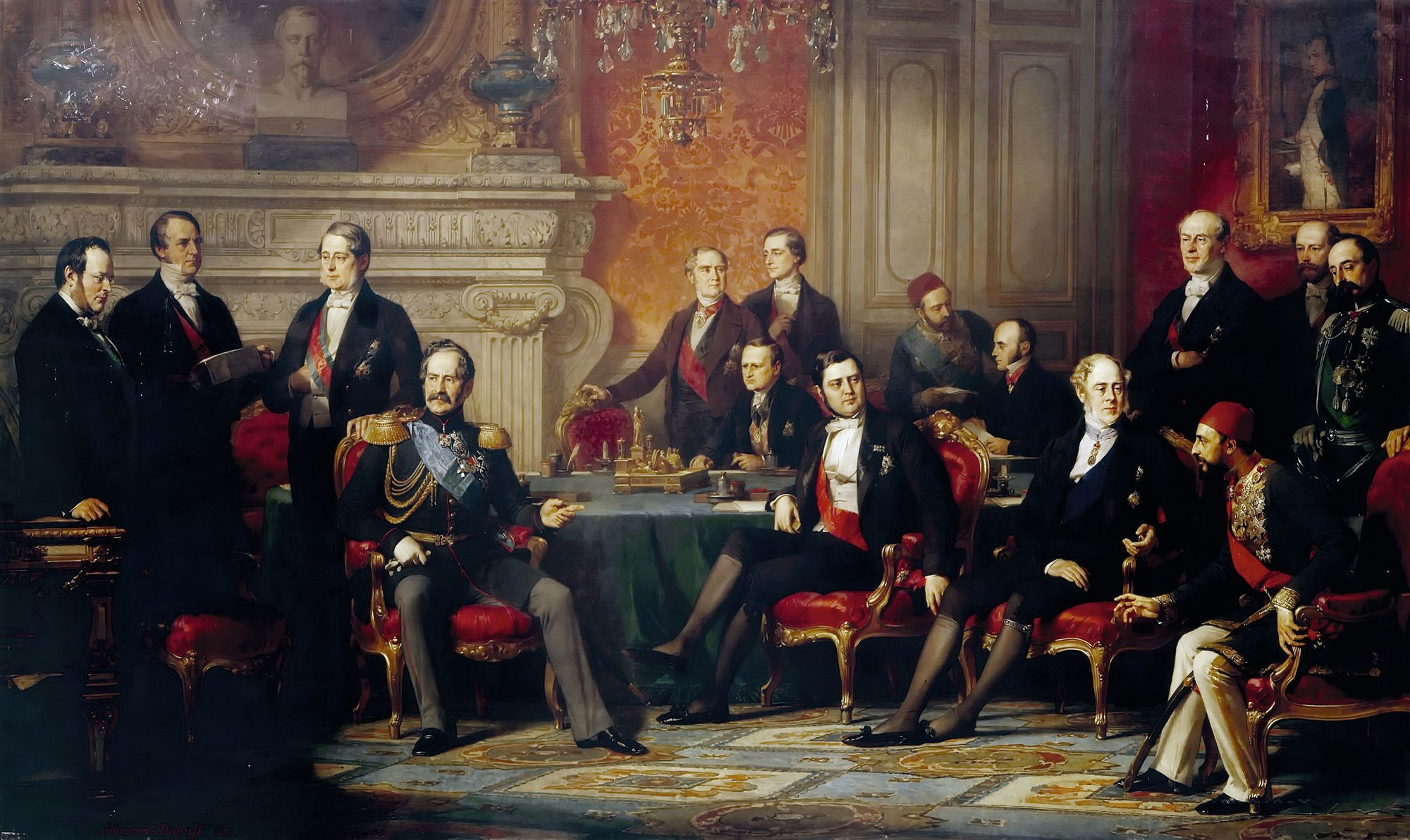
- The Congress of Paris by Edouard Dubufe, 1856, Palace of Versailles.
- Type: Multilateral Treaty
- Signed: 30 March 1856
- Location: Paris, France
- Original signatories: Austria; France; Prussia; United Kingdom; Sardinia; Ottoman Empire; Russia
- Ratifiers: France, United Kingdom, Ottoman Empire, Sardinia, Prussia, Austria, Russian Empire
- Language: French

The Treaty of Paris of 1856, signed on 30 March 1856 at the Congress of Paris, brought an end to the Crimean War (1853–1856) between the Russian Empire and an alliance of the Ottoman Empire, the United Kingdom, the Second French Empire and the Kingdom of Sardinia.

The treaty diminished Russian influence in the region. It returned Sevastopol and other towns and cities in the south of Crimea to Russia, but prohibited Russia from establishing naval or military arsenal on the coast of the Black Sea, which was made neutral territory, closing it to all warships and prohibiting fortifications and the presence of armaments on its shores. In 1871, these prohibitions were renounced in the Treaty of London.

The treaty also had Russia return to Moldavia part of its territory it had annexed in 1812 (to the mouth of the Danube, in southern Bessarabia). Russia lost any claim to influence the Danubian principalities and the Principality of Serbia, or to protect Christians in the Ottoman Empire.

== Summary ==
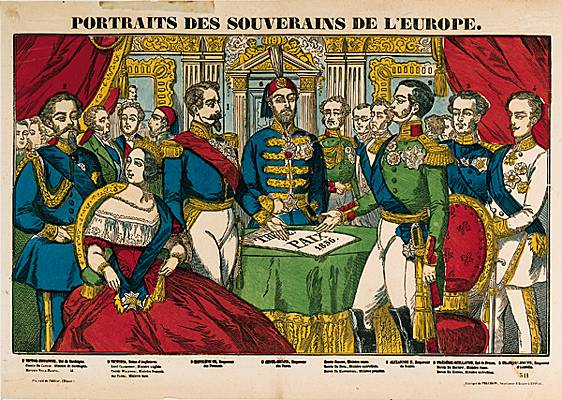
Épinal print of the sovereigns of Europe during the Congress of Paris, 1856

The Treaty of Paris was signed on 30 March 1856 at the Congress of Paris with Russia on one side of the negotiating table and France, Britain, the Ottoman Empire and the Kingdom of Sardinia on the other side. The treaty came about to resolve the Crimean War, which had begun on 23 October 1853, when the Ottoman Empire formally declared war on Russia after Russian troops occupied the Danubian Principalities.

The Treaty of Paris was seen as an achievement of the Tanzimat policy of reform. The Western European alliance powers pledged to maintain the integrity of the Ottoman Empire and restored the respective territories of the Russian and the Ottoman Empires to their pre-war boundaries. They also demilitarised the Black Sea to improve trade, which greatly weakened Russia's influence in the region. Moldavia and Wallachia were recognized as quasi-independent states under Ottoman suzerainty. They gained the left bank of the mouth of the Danube and part of Bessarabia from Russia as a result of the treaty.

== Negotiations ==
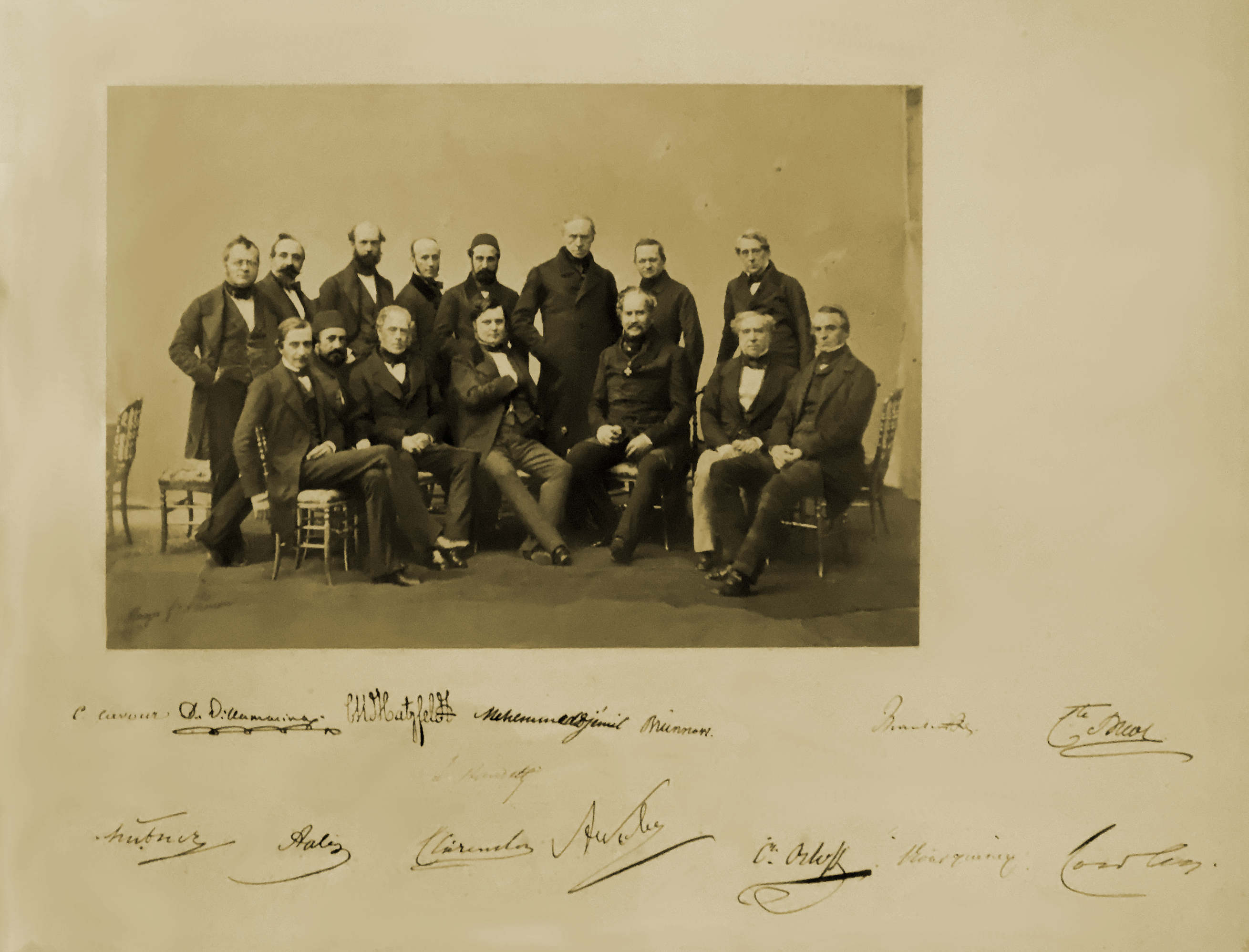
Participants of the Congress of Paris, 1856

As the Crimean War ended, all sides of the war wanted to come to a lasting resolution due to the casualties and attrition suffered. However, competing ideas of war resolution inhibited the drafting of a lasting and definitive peace treaty. Even amongst the allies, disagreements between nations concerning the nature of the treaty created an uncertain peace, resulting in further diplomatic issues involving the Ottoman Empire, especially in terms of its relations with the Russian Empire and the Concert of Europe. Also, mistrust between the French and British allies during the war effort compounded problems in formulating a comprehensive peace. Thus, the terms of the treaty made future relations between the major powers uncertain.

== Peace aims ==
=== Russian aims ===
When Alexander II took the crown of Russia in 1855, he inherited all the problems of an empire stretching from parts of Finland to Poland and Crimea, and losing this war. Alexander II pursued peace talks with Britain and France in Paris in 1856, seeking to keep some imperial possessions, to stop the deaths of thousands of its army reserves, and to prevent an economic crisis. Similarly, Russia wanted to maintain at least a pretence of military power, which had posed a formidable threat to the west European allies. It attempted "to turn defeat into victory ... through ... peacetime [internal] reforms and diplomatic initiatives."

=== Britain and France ===
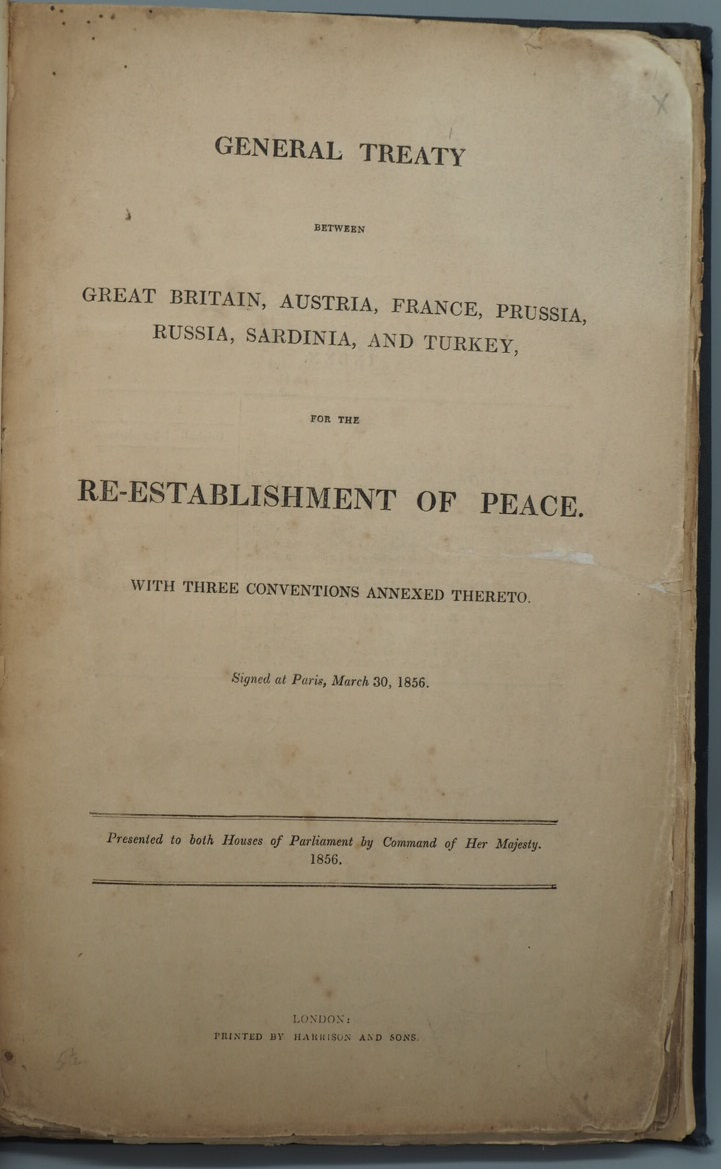
Cover of the English version of the Treaty of Paris, 1856

During the war Britain and France resumed their latent rivalry, largely derived from the Napoleonic Wars. The French blamed many of the defeats of the alliance on the fact that Britain had marched into war without a clear plan. Defeats including the Charge of the Light Brigade during the Battle of Balaclava highlighted the logistical and tactical failures of Britain, and spurred calls for increased army professionalism. The British were increasingly wary throughout the war that the French might capitalise on a weakened Russia and focus their attention on seeking revenge on the British for French military defeats at Trafalgar and Waterloo.

Although there was a call for the end of the war in Britain, including riots in London, there was support for its continuation, and expansion to punish Russia's imperial ambition, particularly from the incumbent prime minister Lord Palmerston.

Britain and France desired to ensure a stable balance of power in Europe, meaning preventing the Russian Empire and the Austrian Empire to get stronger at the expense of the Ottoman Empire. They hoped that peace and restricting Russian access to key areas, such as the Black Sea, would allow the Ottoman Empire to focus on internal issues including rising nationalism in many nations under the empire's authority. Thus, the full removal of Russian presence in the Danubian principalities and the Black Sea served both to protect British dominance and to inhibit the Russian Empire from expanding its influence readily.

== Russian losses ==
The Ottoman, British and French governments desired a more crushing defeat for Russia, which was still crippled in many key areas. The Russian Empire had lost over 500,000 troops and knew that pressing further militarily with their largely unprofessional army would have resulted in higher casualties and attrition.

Russia had to return to Moldavia part of its territory it had annexed in 1812 (to the mouth of the Danube, in southern Bessarabia). The Danubian principalities and the Principality of Serbia were given greater self-government, resulting in the Russian Empire having a diminished influence over them after the previous period of common tutelage for the Ottomans and the Congress of Great Powers.

Russia was forced to abandon its claim to protect Christians in the Ottoman Empire, which initially served as part of the pretext for the Crimean War.

Russian warships were banned from sailing the Black Sea, which greatly decreased Russian influence over the Black Sea trade.

The defeat accentuated the impediments of the Russian Empire, contributing to future reform including the emancipation of the serfs and the spread of revolutionary ideas.

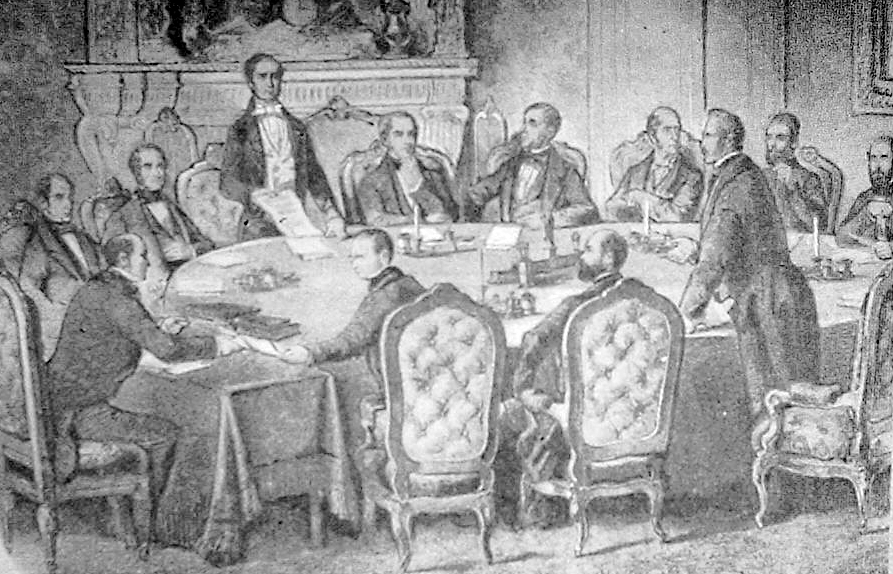
Treaty of Paris: debates

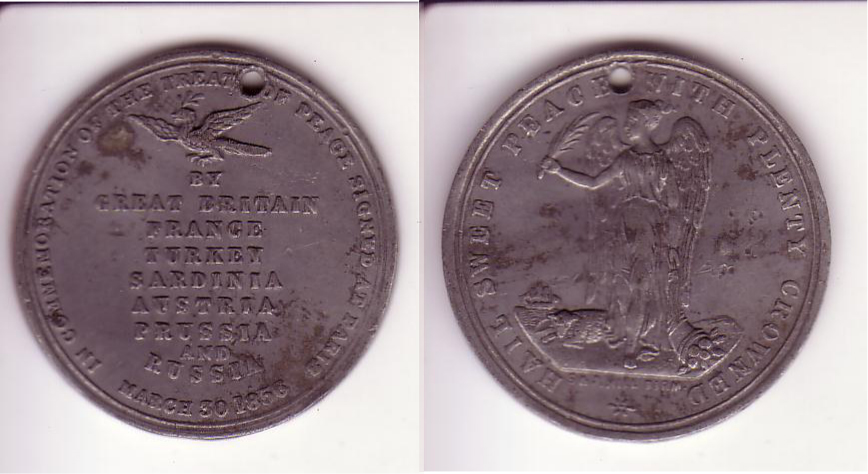
A medallion issued to celebrate the end of the Crimean War and the Treaty of Paris, made from a soft, "silver colour" alloy

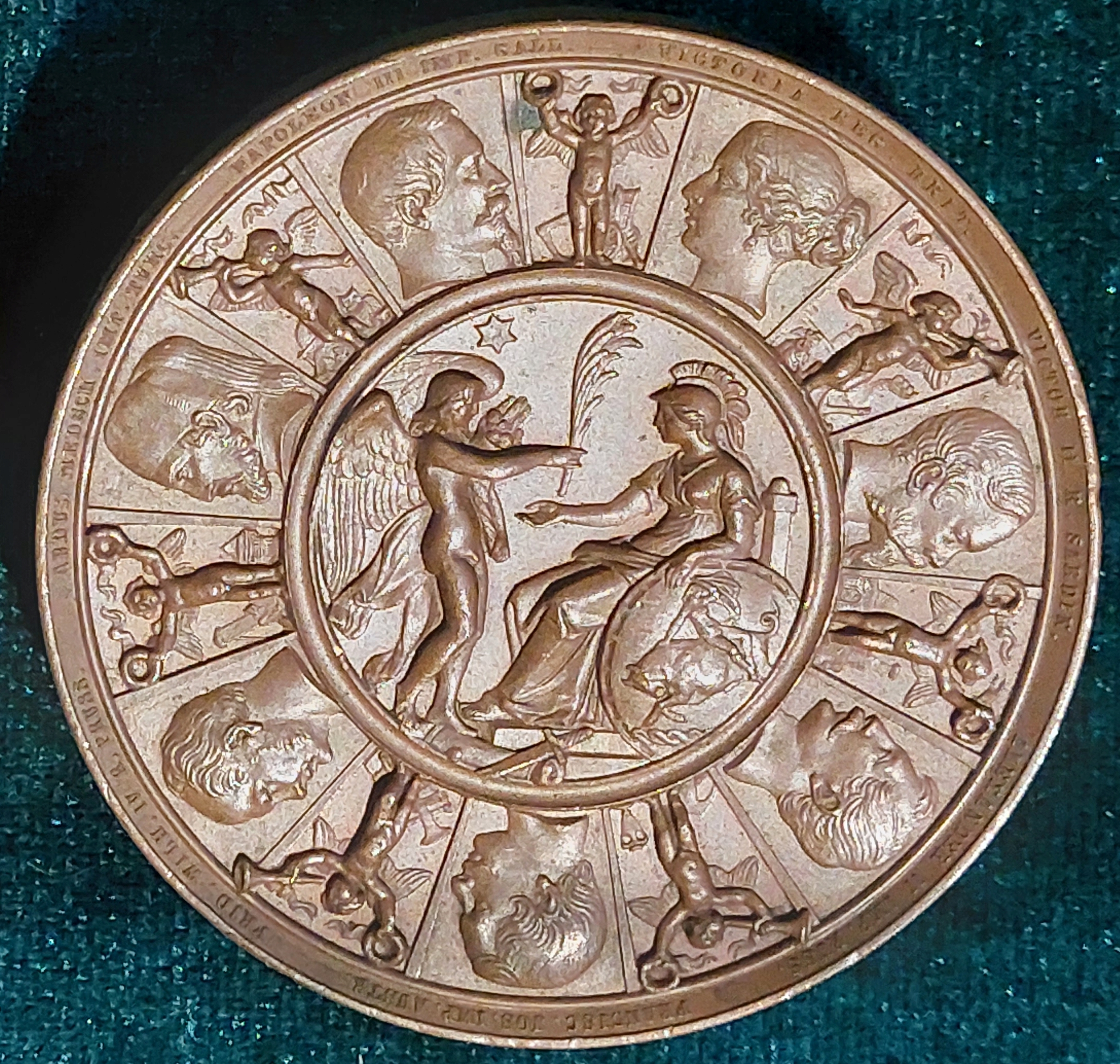
Medal in honor of the conclusion of the Paris Peace

== Short-term consequences ==
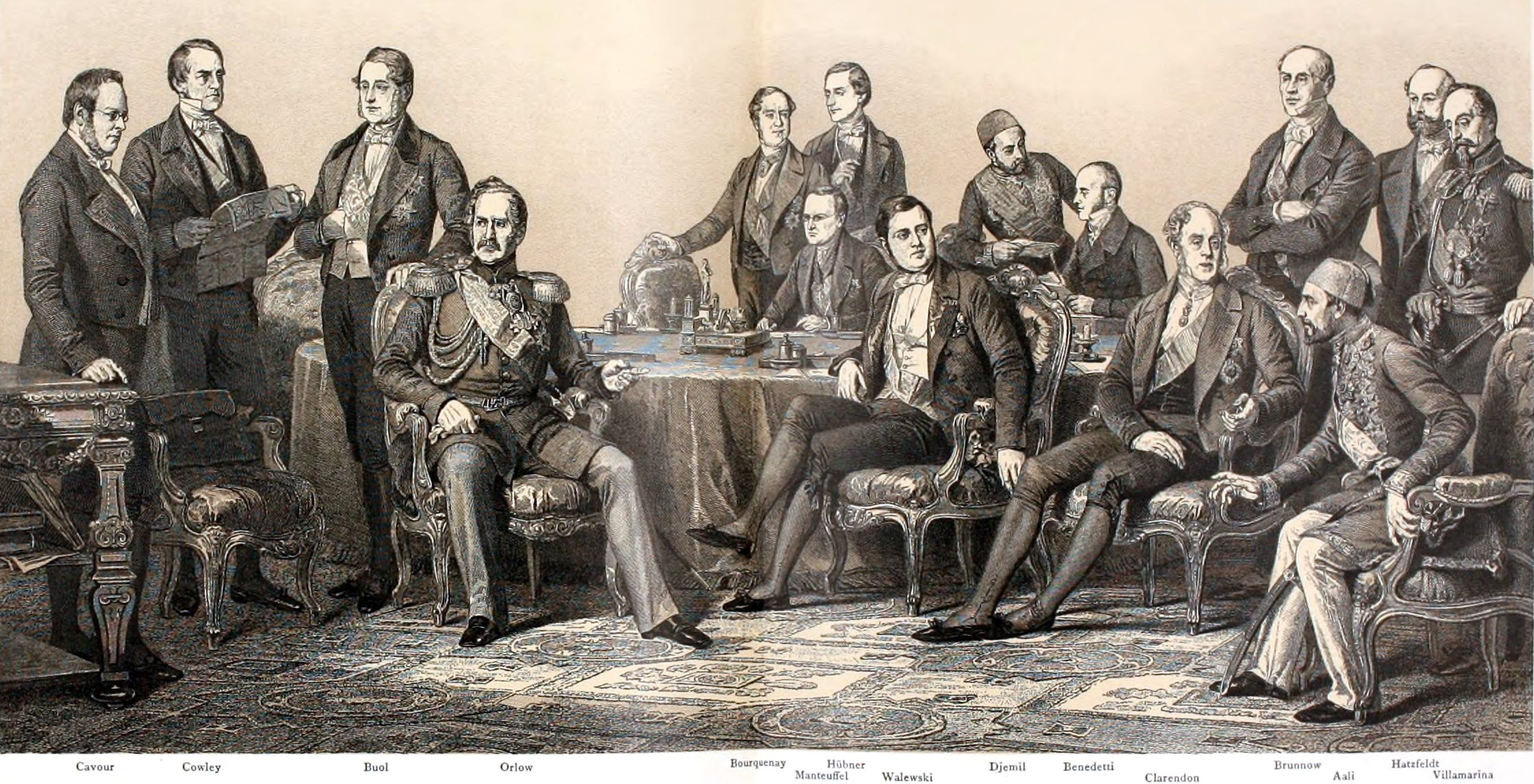
From Auguste Blanchard's copper-plate engraving, based on Édouard Dubufe's picture

The treaty reopened the Black Sea for international trade to be safe and effectual after both the naval warfare of the Crimean War and the presence of Russian warships had made trade difficult, including many trade disputes.

The Treaty of Paris was influenced by the general public in France and Britain because the Crimean War, was one of the first wars in which the general public received relatively prompt media coverage of the events. The British prime minister, Lord Aberdeen, who was viewed as being incompetent to lead the war effort, lost a vote in parliament and resigned in favour of Lord Palmerston, who was seen as having a clearer plan for victory. Peace was accelerated in part because the general population of the western allies had greater access to and understanding of political intrigue and foreign policy, and therefore demanded an end to the war.

== Long-term consequences ==
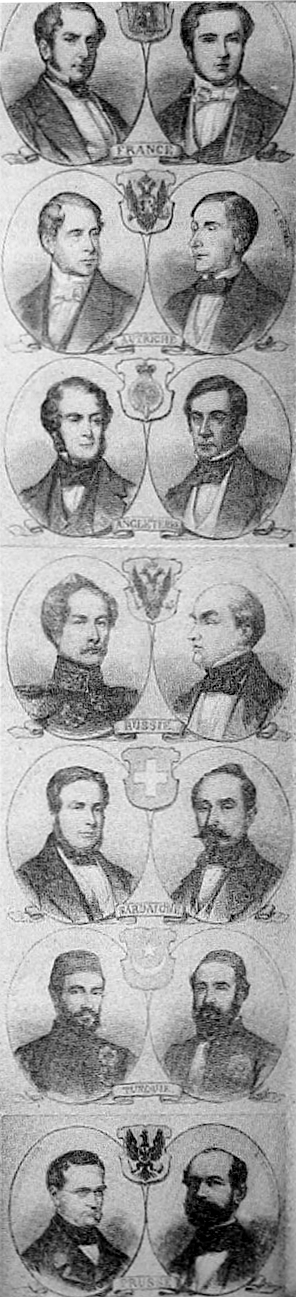
Treaty of Paris participants

Nationalism was bolstered in many ways by the Crimean War, and very little could be done at a systemic level to stem the tides of growing nationalist sentiment in many nations. The Ottoman Empire, for the next few decades until World War I, had to face a number of patriotic uprisings in many of its provinces. No longer capable of withstanding the internal forces tearing it apart, the empire was splintering, as many ethnic groups cried out for more rights, most notably self-rule. Britain and France may have allowed the situation in Europe to stabilise briefly, but the Peace of Paris did little to create lasting stability in the Concert of Europe. The Ottomans joined the Concert of Europe after the Peace was signed, but most European nations looked to the crumbling empire with either hungry or worried eyes.

The war revealed to the world just how important solving the "Eastern Question" was to the stability of Europe; however, the Peace of Paris provided no clear answer or guidance.

The importance of the Ottoman Empire to Britain and France in maintaining the balance of power in the Black and the Mediterranean Seas made many view the signing of the Treaty of Paris to be the entrance of the Ottoman Empire to the European international theatre. Greater penetration of European influence into Ottoman international law and a decline in emphasis of Islamic practices in their legal system illustrate more of an inclusion of the Ottoman Empire into European politics and disputes, leading to its major role in the First World War.

Simultaneously, defeating the Russian forces led the British Empire to believe that Russia was not as much of a threat as before. Great Britain's interest within the region was to curb Russian expansionism and the Ottoman Empire, with their diminished military state, relied on their support for their existence. Surely but slowly, British forces would start to show less of an interest in allying with the Ottoman Empire and maintaining stability in their empire, especially later on during the later Russo-Turkish wars.

Austria and Germany were affected by nationalism as a result of the signing of the Peace of Paris. Austria was normally an ally of Russia but was neutral during the war, mobilized troops against Russia and sent at least an ultimatum asking the withdrawal of Russian armies from the Balkans.

After the Russian defeat, relations between the two nations, the most conservative in Europe, remained very strained. Russia, the gendarme of conservatism and the saviour of Austria during the Hungarian Revolution of 1848, angrily resented the failure of Austria to help or assist its former ally, which contributed to Russia's non-intervention in the 1859 Franco-Austrian War, ending Austrian influence in Italy; in the 1866 Austro-Prussian War, with the loss of its influence over the German Confederation; and in the Ausgleich (compromise) with Hungary of 1867, which meant the sharing of the power in the empire with the Magyars. The status of Austria as a great power, after the unifications of Germany, Italy was now severely diminished. Austria slowly became little more than a German satellite state.

A unified and strengthened Germany was not a pleasant thought for many in Britain and France since it would pose a threat to both French borders and British political and economic interest in the East.

Essentially, the war that sought to stabilise power relations in Europe brought about by a temporary peace. The great powers only strengthened nationalist aspirations of ethnic groups, under the control of the victorious Ottomans and of the German states. By 1877, the Russians and the Ottomans would once again be at war.

== Provisions ==
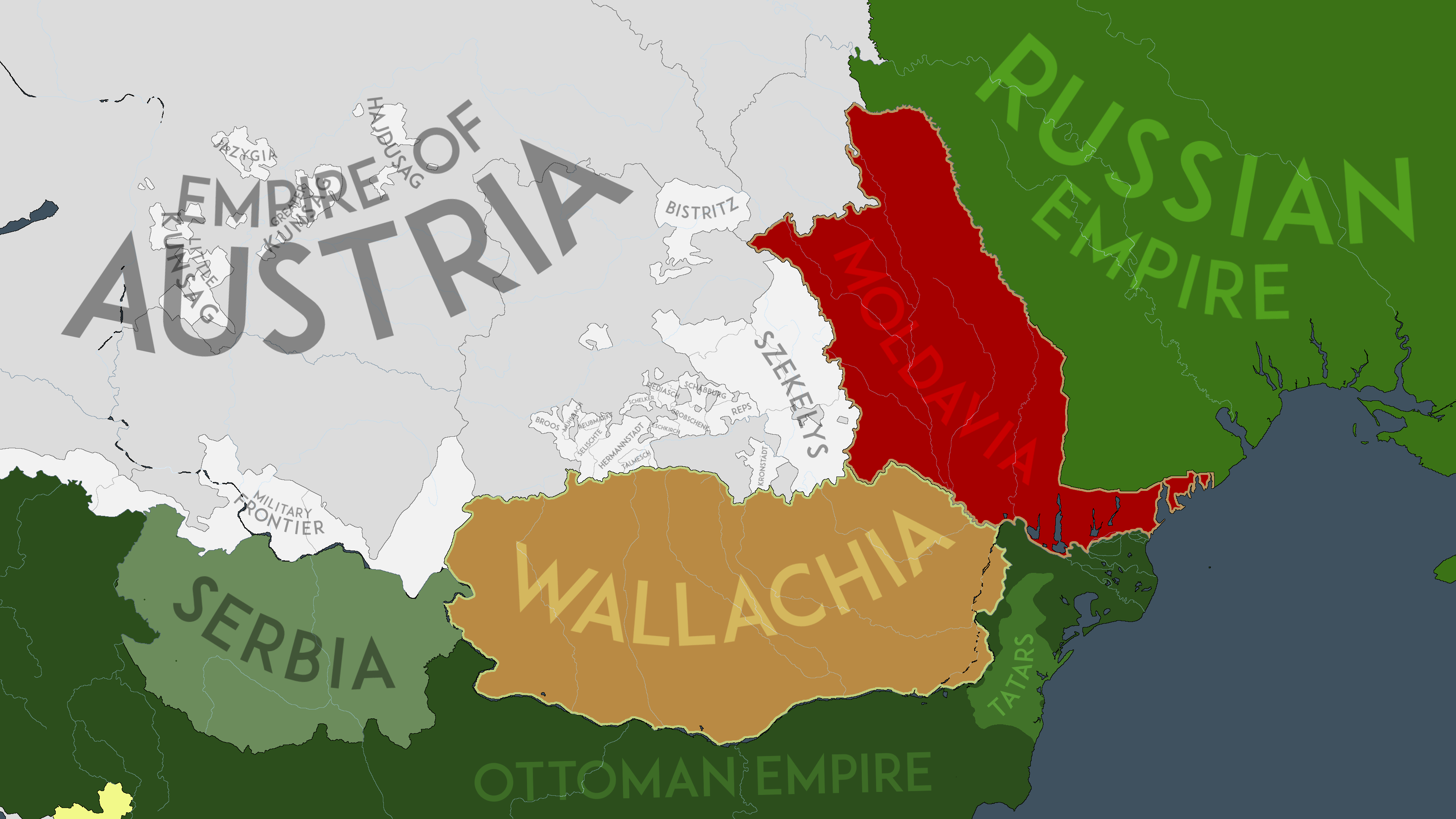
Political situation on the Lower Danube in 1856, after the Treaty of Paris, which further weakened Ottoman influence and established conditions for unification.

The treaty admitted the Ottoman Empire to the European concert, and the Powers promised to respect its independence and territorial integrity. Russia gave up some and relinquished its claim to a protectorate over the Christians in the Ottoman domains. The Black Sea was demilitarised, and a European commission was set up to guarantee freedom of commerce and navigation on the Danube River.

Moldavia and Wallachia would stay under nominal Ottoman rule but be granted independent constitutions and national assemblies, which were to be monitored by the victorious powers. A project of a referendum was to be set in place to monitor the will of the peoples on unification, which eventually happened on 1859. Moldavia recovered part of Bessarabia (including part of Budjak), which it had held prior to 1812, creating a buffer between the Ottoman Empire and Russia in the west. The United Principalities of Romania, which would later be formed from the two territories, would remain an Ottoman vassal state until 1877.

New rules of wartime commerce were set out in the Declaration of Paris: (1) privateering was illegal; (2) a neutral flag covered enemy goods except contraband; (3) neutral goods, except contraband, were not liable to capture under an enemy flag; (4) a blockade, to be legal, had to be effective.

The treaty also demilitarised the Åland Islands in the Baltic Sea, which belonged to the autonomous Russian Grand Duchy of Finland. The fortress Bomarsund had been destroyed by British and French forces in 1854, and the alliance wanted to prevent its future use as a Russian military base.

== Signing parties ==
- France
  - Alexandre, Count Colonna-Walewski, Minister of Foreign Affairs
  - François-Adolphe, Baron de Bourqueney, ambassador to Vienna
- Austria
  - Count Karl Ferdinand von Buol, Foreign Minister
  - Baron Joseph Alexander von Hübner, ambassador to Paris
- United Kingdom
  - George Villiers, 4th Earl of Clarendon, Foreign Secretary
  - Henry Wellesley, 2nd Baron Cowley, ambassador to Paris
- Prussia
  - Otto Theodor von Manteuffel, Minister President of Prussia
  - Count Maximilian von Hatzfeldt-Trachenberg, ambassador to Paris
- Russia
  - Alexey Fyodorovich, Count Orloff, Plenipotentiary
  - Count Philipp von Brunnow, ambassador to German Confederation
- Sardinia
  - Camillo Benso, Count of Cavour, Prime Minister
  - Salvatore Pes, Marquis of Villamarina, ambassador to Paris
- Ottoman Empire
  - Mehmed Emin Âli Pasha, Grand Vizier
  - Mehmed Cemil Bey, ambassador to Paris

== Legacy ==
- In 2006, Finland celebrated the 150th anniversary of the demilitarisation of the Åland Islands by issuing a commemorative coin. Its obverse depicts a pine tree, very typical in the Åland Islands, and the reverse features a boat's stern and rudder, with a dove perched on the tiller, a symbol of 150 years of peace.
- Berwick-upon-Tweed – an apocryphal story concerns Berwick's status with Russia

== Sources and further reading ==
- Adanir, Fikret. "Turkey's entry into the Concert of Europe." European Review 13#3 (2005): pp 395–417.
- Baumgart, Winfried, and Ann Pottinger Saab. Peace of Paris, 1856: Studies in War, Diplomacy & Peacemaking (1981), 230 pp
- Figes, Orlando. The Crimean War: A History (2010) pp 411–65.
- Hazen, C. D. et al. Three Peace Congresses of the Nineteenth Century (1917) pp 23–44. online
- Jelavich, Barbara. St. Petersburg and Moscow: tsarist and Soviet foreign policy, 1814-1974 (Indiana University Press, 1974) pp 128–33.
- Mosse, W. E. "The Triple Treaty of 15 April 1856." English Historical Review 67.263 (1952): pp 203–229. in JSTOR
- Taylor, A.J.P. The Struggle for Mastery in Europe: 1848–1918 (1954) pp 83–97
- Temperley, Harold. "The Treaty of Paris of 1856 and Its Execution," Journal of Modern History (1932) 4#3 pp 387–414 in JSTOR
