= Jamilya =

Jamilya may refer to:

- Jamila (novel), a 1958 novel by Chingiz Aytmatov
- Jamilya (film), a 1968 Soviet drama film, based on the novel

== See also ==
- Jamila (disambiguation)
