= Jamila (disambiguation) =

Jamila is a feminine Arabic given name.

Jamila may also refer to:

- Jamila (doll), a fashion doll marketed in the Middle East
- Jamila (novel), by Chinghiz Aitmatov
- Jamila (film), a South Sudanese film
- Jamila (Ultra monster), a monster character in Ultraman
- "Jamila", a song by Jose Chameleone
- "Jamila", a song by Unknown to No One
- Al Jamila, an Arabic magazine

== See also ==
- Jameela (disambiguation)
- Jamil, the male counterpart
- Gamil (disambiguation)
- Djémila, an Algerian village
- "Jamillia", a song by Disco Biscuits from Uncivilized Area
