= Saghira =

- First appearance: 2007
- Created by: Saghira SARL

In-universe information
- Gender: Female

Saghira (Arabic for little girl) is a doll created by Moroccan company Saghira Sarl, and launched in 2007. The doll is Muslim, and was created as an alternative to dolls made in western countries. Saghira's sole product currently is a 17.5 inch doll, available in North Africa, parts of Europe and the Middle East.

== History ==
Saghira was created by Moroccan manufacturer Saghira Sarl between 2005 and 2006, and launched on the Moroccan market in January 2007.

Previously, Saghira was available under various model names, including Amira (Princess), Doaa (Prayer), Aya, Abir, Ahd, Shada, Nada, Dahab, Najma, and Nour. However, in order to streamline its marketing efforts, the company decided to focus solely on its core model, a 17.5 inch doll named Saghira.

== Accessories ==
Saghira's attire collection blends traditional Muslim clothing and Western garments. The accessories are inspired by items commonly found in Arabic and Muslim households, and Saghira is available in both veiled and unveiled versions. Unveiled models typically depict Saghira in domestic or familial settings.

== See also ==
- Fulla (doll)
- Jamila (doll)
- Barbie
- Razanne
