= Gamil =

Gamil may refer to:

- Gamil (name), an Egyptian variant of Jamil (list of people with this name)
- Gamil (Barcelos), Portugal, a parish
- El Gamil, Egypt, a airfield, now Port Said Airport
- Gamil Design, an American design firm that became popular when users of Gmail typed the wrong address

== See also ==
- Cemal
- Cemil
- Gamal (disambiguation)
- Jamal
- Jamil
- Jamila (disambiguation)
