= Aksoy =

Aksoy is a Turkish surname. Notable people with the surname include:

- Alp Aksoy (born 2010), Turkish racing driver
- Altan Aksoy (born 1976), Turkish footballer
- Asuman Aksoy, Turkish-American mathematician
- Behiye Aksoy (1933–2015), Turkish singer
- Kadriye Aksoy (born 1999), Turkish female freestyle sport wrestler
- Mehmet Aksoy (sculptor) (born 1939), Turkish sculptor
- Muammer Aksoy (1917–1990), Turkish academic
- Seza Kutlar Aksoy (born 1945), Turkish children's author
- Faruk Aksoy (born 1964), Turkish film director
- Taşkın Aksoy (born 1967), German-Turkish footballer and manager
- Vedat Aksoy (born 1988), Turkish para archer
