= Razanne =

Name of dolls design by Ammar Saadeh

Razanne is a series of dolls designed and produced by Ammar Saadeh, a Palestinian expatriate living in Michigan, United States.

== Overview ==
The dolls hit the consumer markets in 1996. Inspired by the American doll Barbie, Razanne is aimed, according to Saadeh, to help Muslim girls develop self-esteem and to dream. All Razanne dolls are equipped with hijab. The United States media already calls Razanne the Muslim Barbie. There are also some further toys and accessories featuring Razanne as a character including a colouring book.

Saadeh hopes the doll will sell well in countries such as Kuwait and the United Arab Emirates, where it has been sold since 2004. The doll is expected to sell well in Saudi Arabia, where the doll also debuted in 2004.

Apart from sales in the United States, the dolls are also sold in the United Kingdom, Canada, Germany and Singapore.

Another current doll featuring a positive, but identifiably Islamic female character is the Fulla doll marketed in Saudi Arabia, Brazil, China, and Egypt. It is sold more profitably than Razanne.

== See also ==
- Fulla (doll)
- Jamila (doll)
- Saghira
