= Roni Margulies =

Turkish writer (1955–2023)

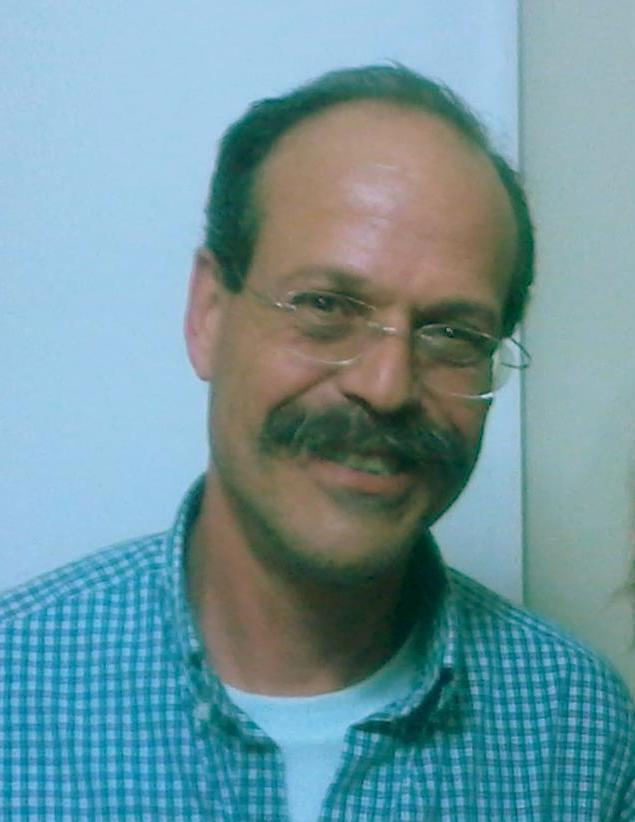
- Born: May 5, 1955; Istanbul, Turkey
- Died: July 19, 2023 (aged 68)
- Education: Economics
- Occupations: Poet, writer

Roni Margulies (May 5, 1955 – July 19, 2023) was a Turkish poet, author, translator, and political activist.

== Early life ==
Margulies was born in Istanbul to a Jewish family. His maternal grandparents were Sephardic Jews from İzmir and his paternal grandparents were Ashkenazi Jews from Poland who settled in Turkey in 1925.

Margulies attended the English-medium Robert College and moved to London in 1972 to study Economics. He moved to London in 1972 and settled there, before eventually moving back to Istanbul towards the end of his life, following increasingly long stints spent in that city.

== Literary career ==
Margulies started writing poetry in 1991 and won the prestigious Yunus Nadi Poetry Award in 2002 with his book of poems, Saat Fark (Time Difference). He published selected translations of the poetry of Ted Hughes, Philip Larkin and Yehuda Amichai in Turkish, as well as Hughes’ Birthday Letters.

== Political activism ==
Margulies was a member of the Revolutionary Socialist Workers' Party (DSİP) and translated Tony Cliff’s State Capitalism in Russia into Turkish. Margulies was also a member of the Trotskyist Socialist Workers Party in the UK, a sister organisation of DSIP, and was active in both Turkish and British political discourse

== Personal life ==
Roni grew up with the Turkish intellectual and cultural historian of Islam İrvin Cemil Schick and they remained lifelong friends until Roni's death.
