= Pioneers of Science =

Pioneers of Science (Turkish: Bilimin öncüleri) (ISBN 9786055888039) is a book by Cemal Yıldırım which has run to 22 editions. The book explains the scientific method with anecdotes from significant figures in scientific history such as Albert Einstein, Niels Bohr and Marie Curie.
