= Jameela (disambiguation) =

Jameela is a genus of butterfly in the family Lycaenidae.

Jameela may also refer to:

- Jameela Jamil (born 1986), a British actress, activist, podcaster, and television host and judge
- Jameela Prakasam, an Indian politician from Kerala
- Kanathil Jameela, an Indian politician from Kerala
- Mulan Jameela (born 1979), an Indonesian singer and politician
- Nalini Jameela (born c. 1954), an Indian author, sex worker activist and former sex worker from Thrissur, Kerala

== See also ==
- Jamila (disambiguation)
- Jameel, an Arabic given name, the male counterpart of Jameela
