= Cemil Ozyurt =

Turkish journalist (born 1976)

- Born: 1976 (age 49–50); Mucur, Kirsehir, Turkey
- Education: Marmara University, Baruch College
- Occupation: Journalist
- Years active: 1995-present
- Known for: Co-founder of Turk of America
- Spouse: Fidan Ozyurt (2008- )

Cemil Ozyurt (born 1976) is a Turkish-American journalist, media manager, and co-founder & editor-in-chief of the U.S.-based Turk of America, the first Turkish-American magazine in English. He is also co-founder & Editor-in-Chief of Turk Avenue, a Turkish global business portal and co-founder of Golden Turk Awards, the only independent organization created to reward successful Turkish Americans.

== Biography ==
Ozyurt was born in Mucur, Kirsehir in 1976. After completing elementary and middle school in Mucur, his family moved to Istanbul. He graduated from Pendik High School in Istanbul in 1993.

Ozyurt graduated from Marmara University Graduate School of Journalism in 1997. He started his journalism career while he was student in the university in 1995 at Dunya Newspaper in Istanbul. He worked for the newspaper as a reporter from May 1, 1995, to December 15, 1998. After daily newspaper experiences, he started to work for Platin, the weekly business magazine. After six months working for the magazine, he joined the Army on August 1, 1999, at Tuzla Infantry School in İstanbul. Completed his duty in October 2000 and continued to work for Platin Magazine.

He moved to the United States on June 19, 2001, to pursue his master's degree. He attended a language school in New Jersey and studied on business journalism at Baruch College, City University of New York in 2004.

With Omer Gunes, he started their first business as magazine publisher in August 2002 in New York City. Turk of America has become the longest running Turkish American magazine that has published by Turkish Americans. In October 2009, Ozyurt and his partners started in New Jersey the first Turkish global business portal. Ozyurt still works as an editor-in-chief of both publications.

He married Fidan Ozyurt in 2008.
