= List of Scan2Go episodes =

The following is a list of episodes of the Japanese/Korean animated television series Scan2Go. The series premiered on September 1, 2012, at 7:00/6:00c on Cartoon Network.

For unknown reasons, the show has never been aired since 2013; this may be because the fanfare was low, an unexpected incident occurred, or because of low income and high taxes.

== Episode list ==
No.	Title	Original U.S. release date
1	"Going for Number 1!"	September 1, 2012
The four young racers are excited to witness their first space race.
2	"Race to Space!"	September 8, 2012
Kaz wants to go to space to train; the team must defeat their coach to prove they are worthy.
3	"The Mystery Racer, Shiro Appears"	September 15, 2012
The gang meets a solo racer named Shiro; the gang races a penguin-themed team that has never been beaten before.
4	"Every Cute Girl Has Her Fangs"	September 22, 2012
An arrogant rival team leader angers Fiona and challenges Team J.E.T. to a race.
5	"Diego's Tree"	September 29, 2012
Diego loses a race to avoid damaging a flower; the gang arrives at the nature-fueled planet Savannah where they learn that a madman named Rhino is attempting to seize control of the planet and its tree of life.
6	"The Squid King"	October 6, 2012
Team J.E.T.'s bus crashes on the planet Geso, where Myron accidentally enters Team J.E.T. in an underwater race against the Squid King Kraken Gesoika MVIII for a prized engine; Myron begins to ponder the purpose of his racing.
7	"The Masked Racer, Zero"	October 13, 2012
Kaz enters an exhibition match to race his idol, Zero.
8	"The Young Scarlet Hero, Antares"	October 20, 2012
Kaz challenges Antares to a Scan2Go race, while claiming to be 'Zero's No.1 Apprentice'.
9	"Machine Guru Hipopo"	October 27, 2012
Kaz and his friends set out to find Master Hipopo to train under him after an encounter with Dradd.
10	"Hipopo Defeated! The Secret Of The 7-Colored Treasure!"	November 3, 2012
Master Hipopo is defeated by Team J.E.T.'s rival team; the space pirates, while trying to protect the dojo's treasure! Can Team J.E.T. find out what it is and protect it before the space pirates find it first?
11	"Tracker Jack"	November 10, 2012
Team J.E.T meet Jack when their vehicle suddenly breaks down, to prevent it from happening again in the future; the team, led by Jack, go to see a mechanic.
12	"A Repeat Clash! Kaz vs. Shiro"	November 17, 2012
Team J.E.T find out their progress result on their way to Gurao, but when Diego is the lowest, Kaz and the gang conjure up a plan to cheer him up at their next race. Will their plan fail or succeed in cheering up Diego or will it make things worse?
13	"Diego's Awakening"	November 24, 2012
With the help of his friends, Diego discovers just how good a racer he can be.
14	"Gurao's Tiger"	December 1, 2012
The racers arrive on Gurao and need to pass an entrance exam to begin studying in Gurao. Who will pass the entrance exam and get a spot in the Top 10?
15	"Demon Instructor Dile"	December 8, 2012
The racers enter their training for a spot in Team Gurao with a new coach, Coach Dile. The coach makes the racers hungry and tired. Are the racers willing to give up, or will they survive the training course?
16	"Horror! The Mysterious Desert Island"	December 15, 2012
When Coach Dile dumps the team and their rivals from the academy on a deserted island, will they come through without giving up?
17	"The Dragon of Destruction Arrives"	December 22, 2012
When the mysterious Ryu Kaizel appears in Gurao Training area and Dradd get over worked, what will be the outcome of the race against the team?
18	"Dragon-Tiger Clash!"	January 5, 2013
When everyone has their suspicions about Ryu and when Kaz and Tiga both decide to race him, what will be the unexpected outcome?
19	"Zero and Taiga"	January 12, 2013
Taiga faces off against the legendary Zero who turns out to be his older brother.
20	"Scout! Scout! Scout!"	January 19, 2013
Teams of four are formed for the graduation race.
21	"The Howling Golden Wolf"	January 26, 2013
Kaz is criticized for his teamwork by Dradd.
22	"The End of Team JET?!"	February 2, 2013
Time is running out to choose teams; Team JET considers disbanding; Kaz begins to question Ryu's strategy.
23	"The Graduation Race Begins"	February 9, 2013
The graduation race approaches.
24	"Show Race"	February 16, 2013
Dradd challenges Ryu to a rematch.
25	"Fire and Ice"	February 23, 2013
Diego, Kraken and Shiro race in stage three of the graduation competition.
26	"Soar Out to Space!"	March 2, 2013
Kaz faces Ryu Kaizel and Taiga in the final race at the Gurao Academy.
27	"The Path to the Grand Prix"	March 9, 2013
Kaz fixates on winning the Grand Prix.
28	"Falgor Breaks Through"	March 16, 2013
Falgor evolves, surprising everyone.
29	"The Evolution of Team JET"	March 23, 2013
Fiona, Diego, and Myron want their vehicles to evolve like Kaz's; the bus lands on an ice planet; the racers attempt to lock Team J.E.T. in the bus.
30	"Magic! Witchcraft! Major Melee!"	March 30, 2013
Team J.E.T. and the space pirate sisters discover they have more than Scan2Go racing in common. Mr. Rabbik, a well known magician maybe behind their machines not following directions any longer. Is this the end of their racing forever or at least till they discover how to get new Scan cards for their machines?
31	"The Ugly Peachick"	April 6, 2013
Planet Botto is a world of various sentient birds and about to have its Trial Cup race. While not on Team J.E.T.'s planned stops, fate (or maybe the writers) have different plans. A legacy Scan2Go racer lost the will to race and views Scan2Go as nothing more than a game. Kaz comes to his aid and helps both him and his machine start their journey.
32	"Ghost Racer"	April 13, 2013
Team J.E.T. and P.E.L meet a space going ghost ship. The ship affects each member of the team differently, except for Kaz who sees it as just another opportunity to race. Will the ghosts, though, let such a fun individual, as Kaz every leave, though?
33	"Wolver, The Flash"	April 20, 2013
This episode is an homage by the Scan2Go creators and writers to "Star Wars Episode V: The Empire Strikes Back. When Shiro's one person space craft ends up in the mud, it leads Team J.E.T. and Shiro down a common path, and allows Mater Hipopo to show the viewers a power new to them.
34	"Race Kingdom"	April 27, 2013
The 10,000th anniversary of Gesodorba Kingdom draws Team J.E.T., Shiro, and King Kraken to an adventure that will either make or break the King, as a leader and as a Scan2Go racer.
35	"Revival, Antares"	May 4, 2013
The excitement of four races brings us to the disappointing situation of Antares and his machine Scorvilain. While Taiga is still trying to catch his brother, Professor Zero, he comes upon Antares who is no longer racing, as he lost his machine in a previous race. Is there a revival in the future for Antares and Scorvilain or is fear what awaits this and other Gurao graduates?
36	"The Tricolor Guys"	May 11, 2013
TBA
37	"Wild Cats"	May 18, 2013
Fiona meets her future rival, Titi, who has been till now a wishy-washy Scan2Go racer because of her pop singing career manager. Titi's public attitude towards Scan2Go upsets Fiona, who won't give her an edge just because she's the current hottest pop star in the Universe. Fiona feels Scan2Go is serious and either Titi takes it seriously or she needs to go back to the lower / amateur circuits and not the Grand Prix races. Can either Kaz or Shiro stand up on the course when these two wild cats go at each other?
38	"The Enemy is JET"	May 25, 2013
When is Team J.E.T. not Team J.E.T.? When they have yet to learn about the strength of their marketing! It seems Team J.E.T., which now clearly includes Shiro Sutherland, has so much name recognition and so little protection pirates and thieves are stealing their good name and leaving the team to clean up the mess! Can our heroes solve this problem and restore their name on planet Alto and what about the rest of the Universe? Is it time for Team J.E.T. to get a lawyer, manager, etc? Is this the end of Team J.E.T. the fun loving racers and the beginning of Team J.E.T. the business?
39	"A New World"	June 1, 2013
Can Scan2Go be more than racing? Can Shiro see past only winning? Team J.E.T. arrives on a world where Scan2Go developed along a different track than the rest of the Universe. How will this civilization and its culture affect the individual members of Team J.E.T.?
40	"Last Chance - Putting It All on the Line!"	June 8, 2013
As Team J.E.T. is hanging out watching a news report on the Grand Prix race, they learn it takes five challenge cup wins to qualify. As they start counting their wins, we learn their current win counts. Fiona, Myron have five wins each, Diego has six wins, Shiro has eight wins, but Kaz everyone realizes only has 4 wins!!! Why? He's been busy doing local races and ignoring the require races to enter the Final Grand Prix race! In order for Kaz to enter the Final Grand Prix, he must enter and win the last challenge cup race of the season. The Great Challenge Cup is a long distance race taking place over three days in a rally format. Like Kaz we discover there are other Gurao graduates who only have four wins and are looking for their fifth win. Can Kaz win his fifth race and qualify to enter the finals of the Grand Prix or will he have to wait out till next season? Is everyone participating there for the race or are other plans afoot?
41	"Brothers, Torn Apart"	June 15, 2013
Picking up from where the previous episode ended, we again receive the warning from the wise old man. Team J.E.T. awakes the next day ready to participate in the last challenge cup race of the season, which is "The Great Challenge Cup." It is a long distance race taking place over three days in a rally format. Kaz must win this race in order to qualify for the Grand Prix, as he only has 4 Challenge Cup wins. The Grand Prix requires an individual to have five wins to enter. Meanwhile in another section of the Universe an exhibition race is getting underway of those who already qualified for the Grand Prix. It is going to take place on the actual course where the Grand Prix will occur, thus giving those who enter a chance to experience the track before the actual race. Brothers Taiga and Zero enter the exhibition race. Events tear them apart, possibly forever.
42	"The Eternally Passionate Guys"	June 22, 2013
It is Kaz's last chance to qualify for the Final Grand Prix race and can he do it? With the race 2/3 complete, Kaz has only one day left to come from behind (second place each day) to win The Great Challenge Cup. It doesn't look like Kaz is using all of his Scan2Go passion, until three brothers (Barry, Gary, and Jerry) show him their passion, which is so great that they cheer on Kaz. Will it be enough, though, given no one has ever beaten these brothers in the history of the race? What of the Wise Old Man, who has been warning everyone who will listen, that the land is angry? Will this endanger the race and maybe end it before the third day is over, and thus Kaz's only chance to qualify for the Final Grand Prix race with five wins? What about the others who need this win to enter the Final Grand Prix? Will Gurao graduates Hebina and King Kraken and Team Dradd member Monkey fail to qualify? Remember, only one can take first place and thus gain the necessary qualifying win for the Final Grand Prix race.
43	"Get Past the 100% Mark"	June 29, 2013
With the attack by Ryu Kaizel during the Brothers, Torn Apart episode, the location of the Grand Prix, the Ditona Circuit, no longer exists and Professor Zero continues to be missing. While countless other circuits around the Universe exist, not all of them have the necessary resources to host the largest Scan2Go racing event of the season. The decision of the new location or to cancel is up to the Scan2Go Masters Council. The decision comes down to two locations Earth and Ecotopia. The council decides to hold a Scan2Go race to decide the location. The race will be between the best of both worlds. Earth chooses Kaz Gordon and Ecotopia chooses Nickle to fight it out at Fever Circuit. Who will win and to what lengths will Nickle go to win and how hard can Kaz push for Earth?
44	"Repatriation! Rescue! Withdrawal!"	July 6, 2013
Team J.E.T. arrives home (well home for the original four members) to a rock star, hero's welcome that clearly they didn't expect. After meeting up with Coach Ray, Team J.E.T. begins seeing the marvelous changes not just to Earth, but to the Earth Scan2Go training center. They quickly learn fame is hard work, but also how much the people of Earth need help and protection. Can Team J.E.T. find out what has been happening on Earth to its Scan2Go racers in time to save Scan2Go on Earth, as well as insure the Final Grand Prix begins on time?
45	"Eve of the Final Grand Prix"	July 13, 2013
It is the day before the Final Grand Prix and Team J.E.T. is still attending functions. Today their first function attending the opening ceremony for the brand new Scan2Go stadium on Earth built to host the Final Grand Prix. The President of Earth, the Governor of Earth, and Team J.E.T. are cutting the ribbon. In the meantime the other Gurao graduates and 'Final Grand Prix qualifiers are converging on Earth along with countless number of fans and those lucky enough to have tickets to see the race in person. How does Team J.E.T. and their friend spend the last day before the Final Grand Prix? Tune in and find out!
46	"Start of the Final Grand Prix"	20 September 2013
Thirty two Scan2Go racers from across the Universe qualified for the Space Championship: The Final Grand Prix race held this time around on Earth. The first round consists of four races of eight racers each. The top three in each group advance to the second and final round. The winner of the second round (12 racers) becomes the official number one racer in the Universe! Grand Master Hipopo is the chairman of the event. We learn from his opening speech over half of the qualified racers are rookies to the Final Grand Prix. They will inject a lot of new fresh talent into the event. Meanwhile Ryu Kaizel is on his way to Earth blowing through a small star in what looks to be a fire ball comet. Advancing to the second round from this group of eight are: King Kraken, Space Pirate Hebina and Team J.E.T. member Fiona Ryder. Note: This episode aired on July 20th, through Cartoon Network's website.
47	"Snow of Love Falls Upon the Desert"	22 September 2013
TBA
48	"Where the Light Shines"	22 September 2013
TBA
49	"Challengers to the Future"	27 September 2013
TBA
50	"The Beginning of the End"	29 September 2013
TBA
51	"The Last Race on Earth"	29 September 2013
TBA
52	"The Checkered Flag of Victory!"	29 September 2013
TBA
