= Jamila Jemstone =

- Born: Jamila Mohammed; 16 January 1971 (age 55); Kaduna, Nigeria
- Occupations: Singer, songwriter, music consultant, energy consultant

Jamila Jemstone (born 16 January 1972), a.k.a. Jamila Mohammed, is a British/Nigerian singer, songwriter and music consultant. She was born in Kaduna, Nigeria, and was raised in the UK.

== Background ==
Jemstone is the fifth daughter of Margaret (née Roberts), a nurse from Wales and Inuwa Mohammed, a veterinarian surgeon from Nigeria.

Jemstone attended Penrhos College in North Wales, King William's College in the Isle of Man and Kingston University, UK. After leaving Kingston, she embarked on a career in the music industry, temping at various London record labels before landing a permanent position working for UK-based singer-songwriter Gabrielle, spending the 1990s/2000s working with Go! Beat Records/Polydor and Gabrielle. Jemstone has been working within the energy sector since 2003, whilst still maintaining her passion for songwriting.

== Latest works ==
In May 2011, Jemstone released her debut single "No Regrets" in Nigeria. The song was given good support by radio, TV and press in Nigeria and was received well by critics. Her follow-up single, "We Are One" was released in September 2011, a song aimed at promoting unity and peace in Nigeria. The song was also shortlisted (one of three songs) as the Team Nigeria song for the London 2012 Olympic Games, which was eventually won by the Nigerian act Big Smile with his song “Niaja Don Win”, decided by a national radio vote. Her first album, Story Book, was officially released later in 2012.

Between 2013 and 2016, Jamila completed a BSc (Hons) degree in Oil and Gas Management. She continues to work within the energy sector.
