= Jamillah Knowles =

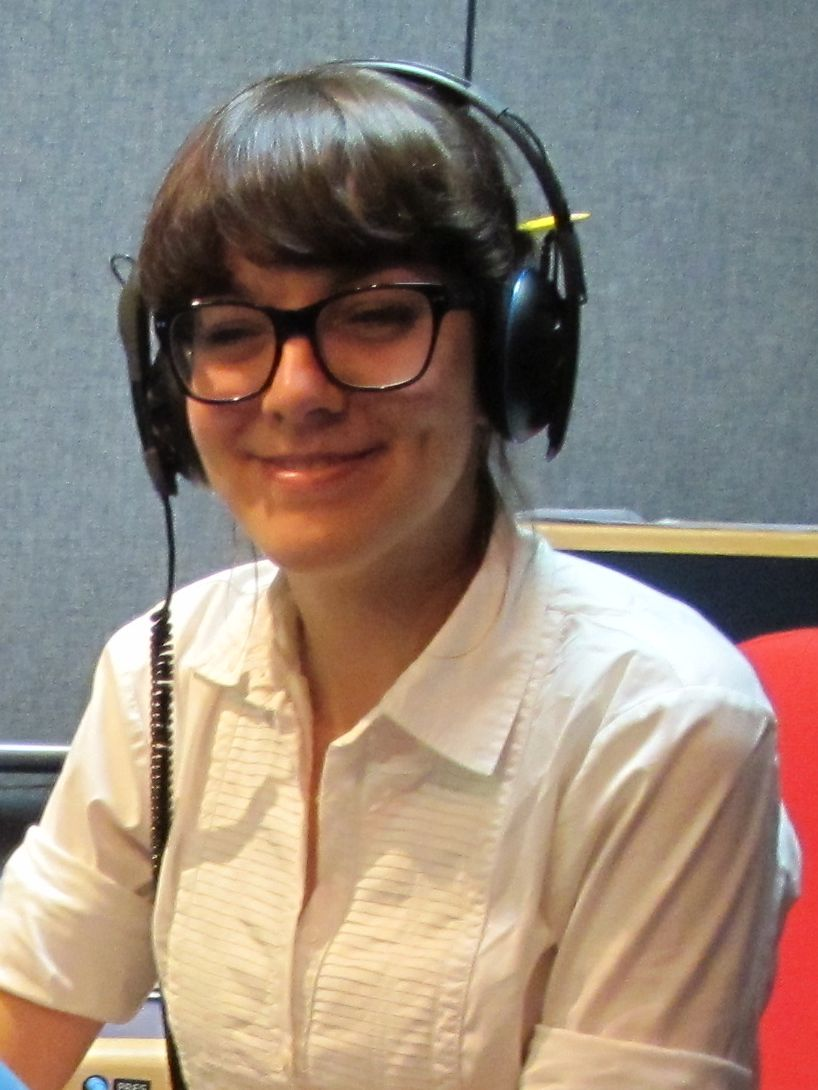
- Knowles in July 2010
- Born: Australia
- Other name: Jemimah Knight
- Occupations: Journalist; Writer; Broadcaster
- Employer: The Next Web
- Jamillah Knowles's voice recorded November 2012
- Website: jemimahknight.wordpress.com

Jamillah Knowles, who also works under the name Jemimah Knight, is a journalist, writer and broadcaster, best known as the producer and presenter of BBC Radio 5 Live's Outriders.

Outriders 2014-04-29 was called "The Final Edition" and included discussion with some of the contributors over the past 9 years. On iTunes, the notes say "Look for the next incarnation online" and Jamillah announced "Transmission Signal" as the name of the new podcast.

Jamillah's journalistic career started in 1993 when she trained as a photographer, sub-editor and feature writer working with Trinity Mirror. She joined the BBC as a producer in 2001.

At the BBC she has reported on global matters for The World Today, Outlook and Radio 5 Live programmes. She has frequently written for BBC News online and has worked in the main UK Newsroom, on user-generated content and social media accounts.

Outriders, formerly known as Pods and Blogs, covers news and views of the people involved at the frontiers of technology and the web. The show also champions the progress of hackers and makers throughout the world. Notable celebrity guests have included Kevin Mitnick, Kevin Kelly, Tim Berners Lee and William Gibson. Since taking on the show, Knowles has presented Outriders from the UK, Nepal, India and the United States.

In March 2012, Jamillah left her news gathering position with the BBC and took up the post of UK Editor with The Next Web, one of the largest publications delivering an international perspective on the latest news about Internet technology, business and culture.

From July 2011 - August 2012 she hosted and produced podcasts for Global Voices Online, which brings together reports from citizen journalists and bloggers everywhere.

She hails from Victoria, Australia and currently lives in London, UK. She has a coveted Blue Peter badge for being part of a record-breaking group Hula hoop dance.
