= Cemal Yıldırım =

Turkish philosopher (1925–2009)

Cemal Yıldırım (1925–2009) was a Turkish philosopher, author, educator, and researcher. He wrote 15 books (4 in English and 11 in Turkish) and numerous academic papers.

He wrote extensively on the philosophy of science and the history of science. His popular books Bilimin Öncüleri ("Pioneers of Science") and Evrim Kuramı ve Bagnazlık ("Theory of Evolution and Dogmatism") were widely read and discussed in Turkey. His book Matematiksel Düşünme ("Mathematical Thinking") was also very influential.

He was the father of the mathematician Cem Yıldırım.

== Books ==
- The Patterns of Scientific Discovery, M.E.T.U. Publications (1981)
- Logic: The Study of Deductive Reasoning, M.E.T.U. Publications (1973)
- Science: Its Meaning and Method, M.E.T.U. Publications (1971)
- The Logic of Value Judgments, M.E.T.U. Publications (1965)
- Bilimsel Düşünme Yöntemi ("Method of Scientific Thinking"), Bilgi Yayınevi (1997), ISBN 9789755335780
- Bilimin Öncüleri ("Pioneers of Science"), TÜBİTAK Publications (1996), ISBN 9786050028027
- Matematiksel Düşünme ("Mathematical Thinking"), Remzi Kitabevi (1996), ISBN 9789751400789
- Evrim Kuramı ve Bagnazlık ("Theory of Evolution and Dogmatism"), Bilgi Yayinlari (1989) ISBN 975-494-710-4
- Mantık: Doğru Düşünme Yöntemi ("Logic: The Method to Thinking Correctly"), Verso Yayınları (1987). ISBN 9789754947762
- Bilim Tarihi ("History of Science"), Remzi Kitabevi (1983), ISBN 9789751403148
- Bilim Felsefesi ("Philosophy of Science"), Remzi Kitabevi (1979), ISBN 9789751402943
