= Jamila Jaxaliyeva =

Kazakhstani professional golfer (born 1990)

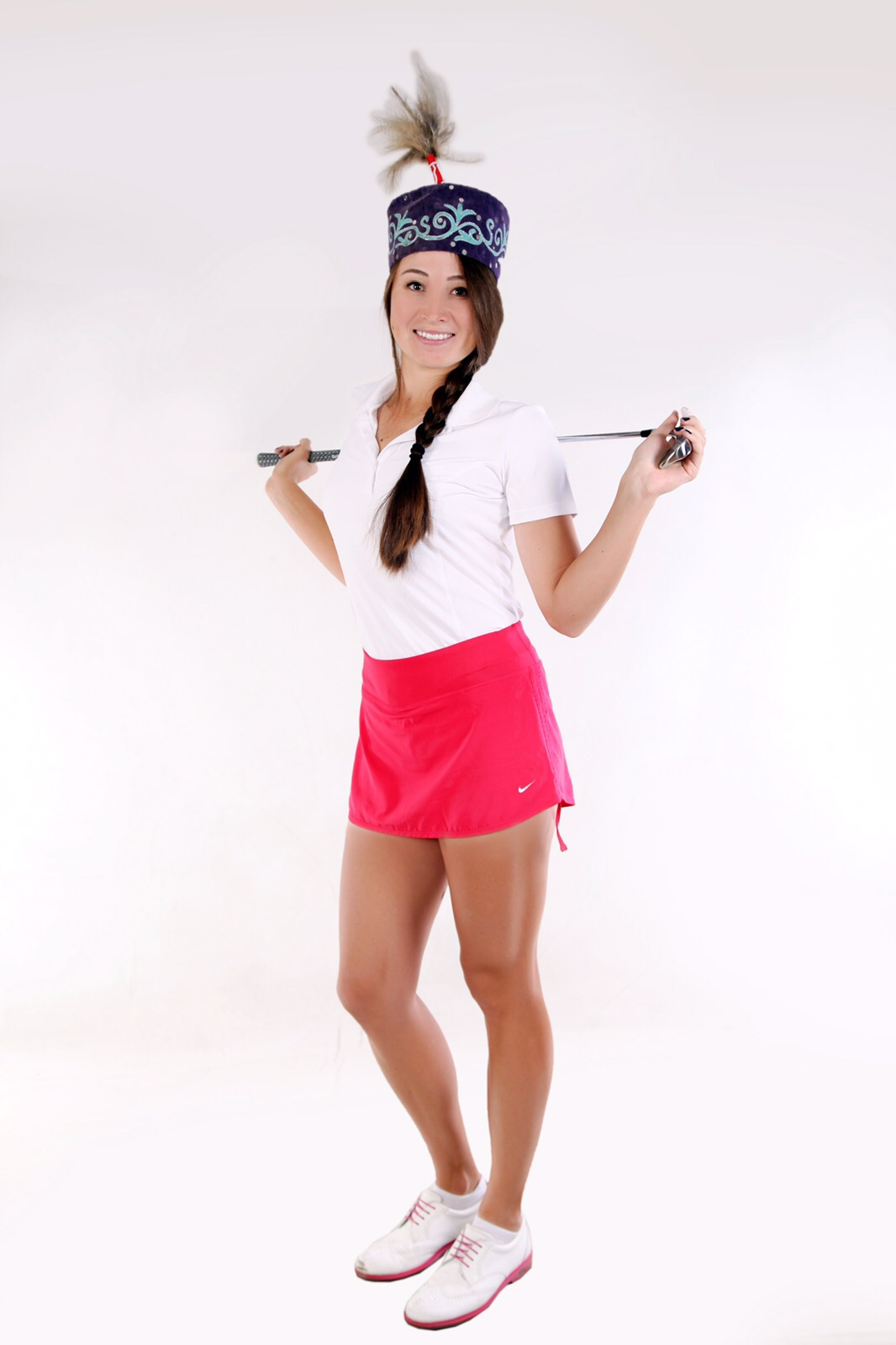

Personal information
- Nationality: Kazakhstan
- Born: 19 May 1990 (age 36) Almaty, Kazakhstan
- Height: 5 ft 7 in (1.70 m)
- Weight: 9.8 st (137 lb; 62 kg)

Career
- Sport: Golf
- College: University of Geneva
- Turned professional: 2014
- Former tours: Symetra Tour; Canadian Women's Tour; LET Access Series; Ladies European Tour; China LPGA Tour

Jamila Jaxaliyeva (Russian: Жамиля Магжановна Джаксалиева) (born 19 May 1990) is a Kazakhstani forester and rangeland ecologist. She was Kazakhstan's first professional golfer and first from her country to receive a Master of Forestry from Yale School of the Environment. She founded Steppelands Foundation, a nonprofit organization that raises awareness on wild horse stewardship, rangeland ecology, livestock-wildlife coexistence, and cultural exchange between Kazakhstan and the American West.

== Golf career ==
Jaxaliyeva began playing golf at age 15 under the guidance of her father Magzhan Jaxaliyev, an engineer. She attended University of Geneva from 2009 to 2013 pursuing a degree in mathematics. She won the 2009 Russian Women's Amateur, 2011 Ukrainian Women's Amateur, 2011 Liechtenstein Women's Amateur, and 2011 Championnat de la Ligue Rhône Alpes.

After becoming the first player from Kazakhstan to qualify for Symetra Tour membership in 2014 she decided to keep her amateur status for most of the 2014 season. In July 2014 she eventually turned professional. In 2015, she finished 7th on the money list of the Canadian Women's Tour. Her best finish was 3rd at the Smiths Falls Golf and Country Club tournament. She became the first player from Kazakhstan to be featured in the Rolex Rankings after placing 3rd in the Azores Ladies Open, an LET Access event. Her 2016 season included a 2nd place finish at the 2016 North Shore Ladies Pro Am, an ALPG event and an 8th place finish at the Nordictrack Open de Strasbourg, an LET Access event.

She also qualified for and competed on China LPGA Tour and the South African Sunshine Ladies Tour.

== Amateur wins ==
- 2009 Russian Women's Amateur
- 2011 Ukrainian Women's Amateur, Liechtenstein Women's Amateur, Championnat de la Ligue Rhône Alpes

== Conservation and professional work ==
Jaxaliyeva earned a Bachelor of Science in Biological Sciences from Arizona State University in 2023 and a Master of Forestry from Yale School of the Environment in 2025. She has worked in rangeland management and forest conservation in Wyoming, including as a range rider on U.S. Forest Service allotments and as a natural resource technician with the Sublette County Conservation District.

In 2025, she founded Steppelands Foundation, a nonprofit organization that raises awareness on wild horse stewardship, rangeland ecology, livestock-wildlife coexistence, and cultural exchange between Kazakhstan and the American West.
