= İrvin Cemil Schick =

Turkish author

- Born: 28 March 1955 (age 70); Istanbul, Turkey
- Occupation: Author, intellectual, historian, lecturer, researcher

İrvin Cemil Schick (born 1955) is a Turkish intellectual and cultural historian of Islam with a focus on the early modern Ottoman Empire.

== Biography ==
İrvin holds a Ph.D. in applied mathematics from the Massachusetts Institute of Technology, and a Ph.D. in history from the Ecole des Hautes Etudes en Sciences Sociales. His research focuses on cultural and intellectual history, the arts of the book (calligraphy, manuscript illumination, miniature painting, marbling), gender and sexuality, anthrozoology, and the occult sciences, particularly within the framework of Islam and Turkey. İrvin has authored, edited, or co-edited eleven books and written a variety of articles. He has taught at Harvard University, the Massachusetts Institute of Technology, and Istanbul Şehir University, and has also held guest positions at Boston University, Sabancı University, Boğaziçi University, and the University of Massachusetts Amherst.

== Personal life ==
İrvin was born in Istanbul, Turkey, on March 28, 1955. He grew up with Turkish poet and activist Roni Margulies and remained lifelong friends until Margulies' death on July 19, 2023. He is married to the sociologist Nilüfer İsvan.

== Books ==
- Hûbân-nâme-i Nev-edâ: Bir İstanbul Esnaf Güzellemesi [The Book of Beauties in a New Style: Encomium for the Merchants and Artisans of Istanbul] (Istanbul: Kalem ve Hokka Yayınları, 2017) (edited).
- Türk Mimarisinde İz Bırakanlar: Türk Mimarisinde Abide Şahsiyetler [Those Who Have Left Traces on Turkish Architecture: Principal Figures of Turkish Architecture], 4 vols. (Ankara: T.C. Çevre ve Şehircilik Bakanlığı, 2015) (co-edited).
- Calligraphy and Architecture in the Muslim World (Edinburgh: Edinburgh University Press, 2013); Turkish translation: İslâm Dünyasında Hat ve Mimari (İstanbul: alBaraka Yayınları, 2022) (co-edited).
- Bedeni, Toplumu, Kâinâtı Yazmak: İslâm, Cinsiyet ve Kültür Üzerine [Writing the Body, Society, the Universe: On Islam, Gender, and Culture] (İstanbul: İletişim Yayınları, 2011; 2nd ed. 2014; 3d ed. 2017; 4th ed. 2020).
- Women in the Ottoman Balkans: Gender, Culture and History (London: I.B. Tauris, 2007); Turkish translation: Osmanlı Döneminde Balkan Kadınları: Toplumsal Cinsiyet, Kültür, Tarih, (İstanbul: Bilgi Üniversitesi Yayınları, 2009) (co-edited).
- Avrupalı Esireler ve Müslüman Efendileri: “Türk” İllerinde Esaret Anlatıları [European Captive Women and their Muslim Masters: Narratives of Captivity in “Turkish” Lands] (İstanbul: Kitap Yayınevi, 2005) (edited).
- Çerkes Güzeli: Bir Şarkiyatçı İmgenin Serüveni [The Fair Circassian: Adventures of an Orientalist Motif] (İstanbul: Oğlak Yayınları, 2004).
- The Erotic Margin: Sexuality and Spatiality in Alteritist Discourse (London: Verso, 1999); Turkish translation: Batının Cinsel Kıyısı: Başkalıkçı Söylemde Cinsellik ve Mekânsallık (İstanbul: Tarih Vakfı Yurt Yayınları, 2002); Arabic translation: al-Istishraq Jinsiyan (Beirut and Damascus: Cadmus, 2003); Polish translation: Seksualność Orientu: Przestrzeń i Eros (Warsaw: Oficyna Naukowa, 2012).
- Turkey in Transition: New Perspectives (New York: Oxford University Press, 1987); Turkish translation: Geçiş Sürecinde Türkiye (İstanbul: Belge Yayınları, 1990; 2nd ed. 1992; 3d ed. 1998; 4th ed. 2003; 5th ed. 2006, 6th ed. 2014) (co-edited with A. Tonak).

== Recent Articles ==
- “Some Thoughts on an Early Depiction of the Booksellers’ Market in İstanbul,” in The András Riedlmayer Festschrift, ed. S. Smith and K. Leal (Istanbul: Isis Press, forthcoming).
- “Mürekkep ve Boyaya dair bir Kaynak: Risāle-i Elvān” [A Source on Ink and Dye Making: Risāle-i Elvān], in Tarihimizde Gelenekli Sanatların Yeri: F. Çiçek Derman Armağanı, ed., G. Duran and G. Küpeli (Istanbul: Kubbealtı Neşriyatı, forthcoming).
- “Cumhuriyet Döneminde Geleneksel San’atların Serüveni: Yasaktan Yeni Ortodoksluğa” [The Adventures of Traditional Arts during the Republican Period: from Prohibition to the New Orthodoxy], in Kültür, Sanat, Edebiyatta Cumhuriyet’in 100 Yılı, ed. A. Antmen (Istanbul: Tarih Vakfı and İstanbul Büyükşehir Belediyesi, forthcoming).
- “On the Multivalence of Women’s Captivity Narratives,” in Slavery in the Middle East and North Africa in the 19th and 20th Centuries, E. Andreeva and K. McNeer, eds. (London: I.B. Tauris, 2024), 25–52.
- “Epistemoloji (Bilgi Kuramı) Açısından Reşad Ekrem Koçu’nun İstanbul Ansiklopedisi” [Reşad Ekrem Koçu’s Encyclopaedia of Istanbul from the Viewpoint of Epistemology], in Başka Kayda Rastlanmadı, ed. B. Tanju, C. Yapıcı, E. Yurteri, G. Özkara and M. Yıldız (Istanbul: Salt E-Yayın, 2023), 46–57.
- “Islamic Art and Visualities of War from the Ottoman Empire to the Turkish Republic,” New Perspectives on Turkey (2023), 1–29 (with G. Tongo).
- “Osmanlı İstanbul’unda Sese Dönüşen Kitaplar” [Books Transformed into Sound in Ottoman Istanbul], Zemin, 5 (2023), 50–111 (with E. Sezer-Aydınlı).
- “Evliya Çelebi’de Kitaplar ve Kitap Sanatları” [Books and Book Arts in (the works of) Evliyâ Çelebi], Toplumsal Tarih, 354 (2023), 22–29.
- “Reading and Writing Practices in the Ottoman Empire,” in Turkish Literature Handbook, ed. D. Havlioğlu and Z. Uysal (Abingdon, Oxfordshire: Taylor & Francis/Routledge, 2023), 105–115.
- “Kemalizm, Şarkiyatçılık, Garbiyatçılık” [Kemalism, Orientalism, Occidentalism], in Ne Mutlu Eşitim Diyene: Milliyetçilik Tartışmaları, ed. Y. Çongar, M. Arslantunalı, and L. İsvan (Istanbul: Kıraathane Kitapları, 2021), pp. 74–92.
- “Between the Abstraction of Miniatures and the Literalism of Photography: Amateur Erotica in Early Twentieth-Century Turkey,” Journal of the Anthropology of the Contemporary Middle East and Central Eurasia, 5–6 (2017–2019 [2021]), 1–26.
- “I. Mahmud Döneminde Hat Sanatı” [The Art of Calligraphy during the Reign of Sultan Mahmud I], in Gölgelenen Sultan, Unutulan Yıllar: I. Mahmûd ve Dönemi, 1730–1754, ed. H. Aynur (İstanbul: Dergâh Yayınları, 2020), 1: 430–455.
- “Three Genders, Two Sexualities: the Evidence of Ottoman Erotic Terminology,” in Sex and Desire in Muslim Cultures: Beyond Norms and Transgression from the Abbasids to the Present Day, ed. A. Kreil, L. Sorbera, and S. Tolino (London: I.B. Tauris, 2020), 87-110.
- “Chess of the Gnostics: The Sufi Version of Snakes and Ladders in Turkey and India,” in Games and Visual Culture in the Middle Ages and the Renaissance, V. Kopp and E. Lapina, eds. (Turnhout: Brepols Publishers, 2020), 173–216.
- “Osmanlı Edebiyatında Türcülük: Kıyafet İlmi ve Rüya Tabiri Örnekleri” [Speciesism in Ottoman Literature: the Examples of Physiognomy and Oneiromancy], Ecinniler 3 (2020), 56–66.
- “Sultan Abdülhamîd II from the Pen of his Detractors: Oriental Despotism and the Sexualization of the Ancien Régime,” Journal of the Ottoman and Turkish Studies Association 5, 2 (2018), 47–73.
- “Illustrative Traditions in the Muslim Context, 1200–1900,” in History of Illustration, ed. S. Doyle, J. Grove, and W. Sherman (New York: Fairchild Books, 2018), 54–70.
