= Jamila Mujahed =

Afghan journalist

- Occupation: Journalist
- Known for: Made the first announcement of the fall of the Taliban over Radio Kabul

Jamila Mujahed is a journalist of Afghanistan.

== Career ==
In 2001, she broadcast the news that the Taliban regime had fallen. Hamida Ghafour, writing in The Daily Telegraph reported that she had been appointed a delegate to the Constitutional Loya Jirga. She was not, however, on the official list of delegates.

In October 2002, the United States Department of State awarded her a liberty award.

Mujahid had been a television journalist before the Taliban's seizure of power.
