= Jamila Abubakar Sadiq Malafa =

Nigerian international maritime lawyer

- Born: 1965 (age 60–61); Whona village
- Education: University of Lagos; Maritime Institute University
- Occupation: International maritime lawyer
- Known for: First Northern Female Navy General

Jamila Abubakar Sadiq Malafa (born 1965) is an international maritime lawyer and the first female Commodore in the history of the Nigerian Navy. She joined the Nigerian Navy in 1988 and was commissioned as a midshipman in 1990. In December 2017 she became the first Northern woman in the history of Nigerian Navy to reach the rank of Commodore.

== Early life and education ==
Malafa was born in Whona village in Gombi local government area of Adamawa State, northeast Nigeria. She attended St. Theresa School, Luggere, in Adamawa, for her primary education, going on to Government Secondary School Hong, for her secondary education. She then went to the School of Nursing in Yola, where she obtained a national certificate in nursing and midwifery. She applied to further her studies at the University of Maiduguri Teaching Hospital; while awaiting admission there a friend brought to her notice the Nigerian Navy recruitment exercise, for which she applied and was recruited, becoming the only woman recruit from the northern part of Nigeria. After joining the Navy, she went to the School of Nursing, where she earned her midwifery certificate. In 1995, she applied for a law degree at the University of Lagos but was turned down because she had no JAMB examination qualification. So she enrolled herself in a school, sat for JAMB, achieved the required result and was given admission to read law. She obtained her master's degree in constitution and criminal law from the same university in 2004. In 2009, she obtained her second master's degree, in international maritime law, from the Institute University in Malta 2009. As of 2017, she was working toward a Ph.D. degree.

== Career ==
Malafa's journey into the navy started while she awaited admission into the nursing profession, and through her educational achievements, she became the first lawyer of any gender from her village. She earned two master's degrees in Constitution and Criminal law and International Maritime Law from the University of Lagos in 2004 and Maritime institute university in Malta in 2009 respectively. When she returned from Malta to Nigeria, she was among those selected to tour some of the country's northern states, including Sokoto, Kebbi, Katsina, Zamfara and other core northern areas, to encourage young women to join the profession. She additionally solicited the help of the Sultan and the office of the state's Commissioner of Information for their support, but the initiative did not yield fruit. As the Director of the Nigerian Navy Legal, Malafa holds the position of Deputy Director of Civil-Military Relations (Law Support), making her the person in charge of the law department of the Nigeria Navy at the headquarters.

Malafa was decorated in December 2017 with the rank of Commodore, equivalent to a Brigadier General in the Army. The decoration ceremony was witnessed by Vice President Yemi Osinbajo and Chief of Policy and Plans, Rear Admiral Henry Babalola, who represented the Chief of Naval Staff Vice Admiral Ibok-Ette Ibas.

In 2018, in commemoration of International Women's Day, the Nigerian Navy in partnership with the Royal Canadian Navy at the Nigerian Naval Dockyard in Victoria Island organized a programme for young women who were beneficiaries of Action Health Incorporated's tagged "Marginalized Girls Initiative". The girls were given an opportunity to interact with Canadian and Nigerian women in uniform, with the goal of inspiring them to consider opportunities in such male-dominated fields, an event in line with Canada's feminist policy that seeks to promote gender equality and empower women and girls. Malafa was among those who shared her personal stories and struggles about how they joined the Nigerian Navy and how they achieved their levels of success despite the obstacles they faced.
