= Turk of America =

American Turkish magazine

- Frequency: Quarterly
- First issue: August 2002; 23 years ago
- Country: United States
- Based in: New York City
- Language: English
- Website: turkofamerica.com

Turk of America is an English-language quarterly Turkish magazine which reports news about Turkish businesses and the Turkish community in the United States. It was founded in 2002 with its first issue published in August of the same year. "The magazine is not affiliated with any political organization, party, ethnic group, or ideology."

Turk of America is based in New York City. The magazine is distributed in Alabama, Arkansas, California, Connecticut, Florida, Georgia, Illinois, Indiana, Maryland, Massachusetts, New Jersey, New York, Ohio, Pennsylvania, Rhode Island, Texas, Virginia, and Washington, D.C. by subscription, and has a circulation of over 10,000.

The magazine has interviewed major figures including Süleyman Demirel, Recep Tayyip Erdoğan, Kürşad Tüzmen, Güler Sabancı, Ferit Şahenk, Melih Abdulhayoglu, Arif Mardin, Sezen Aksu, Sertab Erener, Fahir Atakoğlu, and Demir Demirkan.
