= Cemil Cahit Güzelbey =

Turkish lawyer, writer, and sociologist (1908–1995)

- Born: 25 February 1908; Aintab, Ottoman Empire
- Died: 1 May 1995 (aged 87); Gaziantep, Turkey
- Education: Kuleli Military High School, Ankara University, Law School

Cemil Cahit Güzelbey (25 February 1908 – 1 May 1995) was a Turkish lawyer, writer, and sociologist.

== Early life and education ==
Güzelbey was born in the Şehreküstü neighborhood of Aintab. He received his primary education in his hometown. He studied in Kuleli Military High School and graduated from Ankara University, Law School in 1938. Although he initially planned to stay in Ankara, he moved back to his hometown after graduation.

== Career ==
While he worked as a lawyer in his hometown, Güzelbey spent a considerable portion of his time on his works. In 1939, Güzelbey started publishing the journal Başpınar, which lasted until 1949 and racked up 108 issues. Several of his articles were published in the journals Gaziantep'i Tanıtıyoruz, Gaziantep Kültür and Türk Folklor Araştırmaları, and newspapers Yenigün and Sabah as well as academic conferences on folklore.

== Personal life and death ==
Güzelbey died on 1 May 1995.

== Bibliography ==
- Aydın, Suavi (1995). "Cemil Cahit Güzelbey'in Ardından" (PDF). Kebikeç (2): 49–61.
