= Mehmed Cemil Bey =

Ottoman diplomat

Mehmed Cemil Pasha
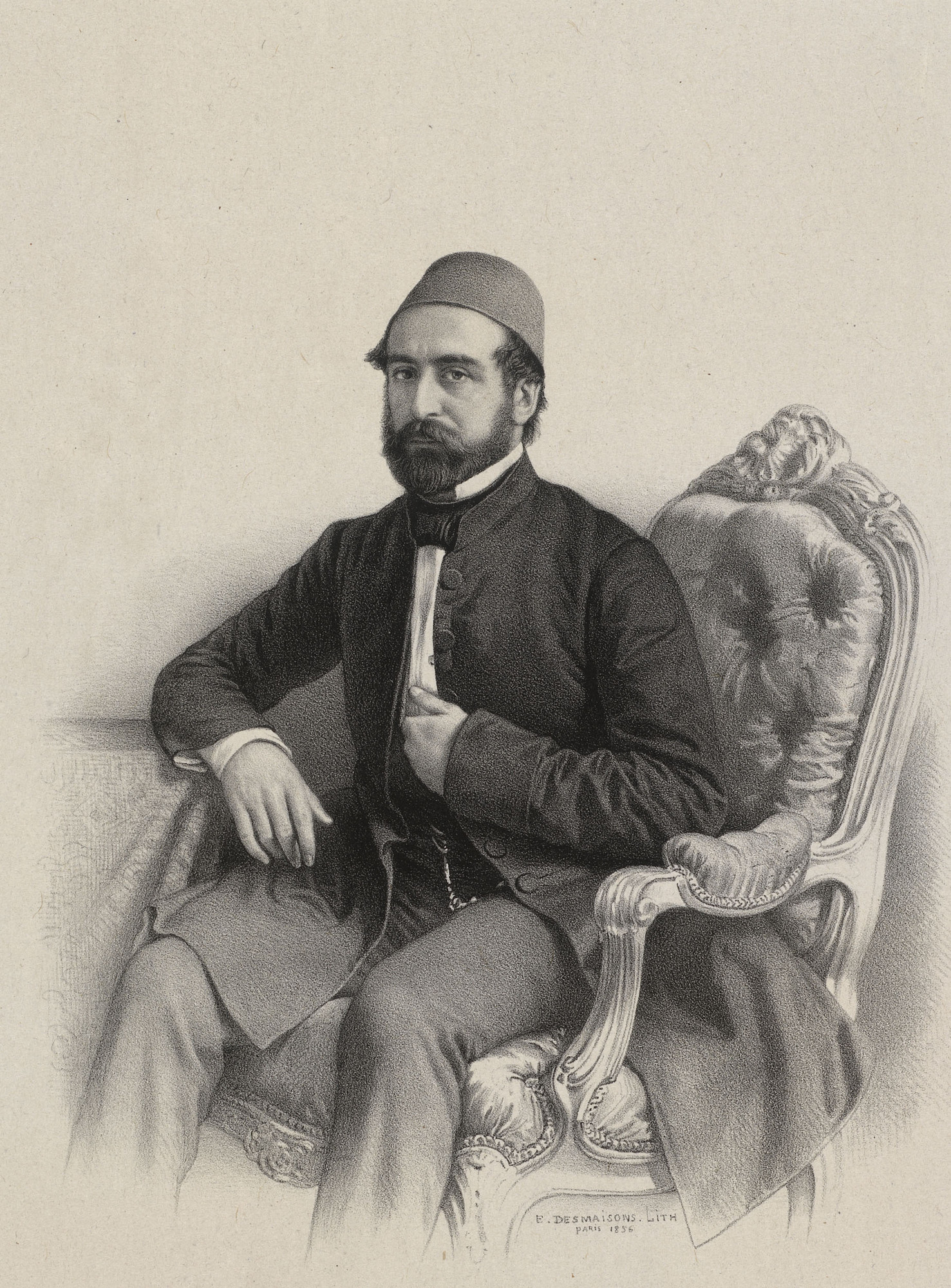

Personal details
- Born: 1828 Constantinople, Ottoman Empire
- Died: 1872 (aged 43–44) Romania

Mehmed Cemil Bey (1828 – 1872) was an Ottoman diplomat, who was one of the many European-educated public figures in the mid-19th-century Ottoman Empire.

He represented the Ottoman Empire at the Congress of Paris, the 1856 diplomatic meeting held to make peace after the Crimean War.

== Early life and career ==
Mehmed Cemil Bey was born in Constantinople as the son of Mustafa Reşid Pasha, the chief architect behind the Tanzimat reforms.

He was a representative of the Ottoman Empire, alongside Mehmed Emin Âli Pasha at the Congress of Paris in 1856. He also served as an ambassador to France.
