= Seza Kutlar Aksoy =

Turkish children's author (born 1945)

- Born: 1945 (age 80–81) Gaziantep, Turkey

Seza Kutlar Aksoy (born 1945, Gaziantep) is a Turkish children's author residing in Istanbul. She is the younger sister of writer Onat Kutlar.

== Biography ==
Seza Kutlar Aksoy was born in Gaziantep, Turkey.

She is a member of the Turkish section of the International P.E.N., TYS (Turkish Writers' Union), and a member of the administrative board of the Turkish Association of Children and Youth Publications. She is nominated as the 2011 Turkey candidate for the Astrid Lindgren Memorial Award, the world's largest children's and youth literature award, and the second largest literature prize in the world.

Seza Kutlar Aksoy's stories have been published in children's literature magazines including Redmouse and Milliyet Kids. Her radio play, Adventures of Memo was broadcast by the Voice of Turkey (Foreign Broadcast of Turkish Radio and Television). One of her stories, Bluebird, was adapted and staged by Tiyatroom Group. Aksoy conducts regular literary sessions with children in schools on reading stories, dramatization and thinking about stories, students' own life or about life itself.

== Publications ==
=== Pre-school ===
- Nil soru soruyor (Nellie Poses Questions)
- Uyku agaci (The Slumber Tree)

=== School-age ===
- Büyülü Bahçe (Enchanted Garden) (Stories)
- Küçük Prenses ve Kardelen (Little Princess and the Snowdrop) (Stories), Tudem
- Tomurcuk ve Pembe Kedi (Rosie and The Pink Cat),
- Tomurcuk ve Pembe Kedi Altın Peşinde (Rosie and the Pink Cat running after Gold), Tudem
- Nun Gelince (When Nun Comes), Tudem
- Güvercin’in Saati (The Watch of Guvercin)
- Şişko Patates (Fat Potato) Can yayinlari
- Akıllı Anka (Clever Phoenix)
- Güneşe Köprü (A Bridge to the Sun) (Stories)
- Seker Kiz ve Buyulu Elma Can yayinlari
- Cevrimicinde Serafettin Can yayinlari

=== Youth ===
- Ask Kalir (Love Remains) Published within the PEACH (Publications on Europe for Adults and Children Through History) project supported by the European Commission's, Horizons Program.

== Awards ==
Aksoy won following prizes in children's literature:

- Sıtkı Dost Awards (1991), mention.
- Turkish Redmouse Awards, Grand Award (1992).
- Tudem Awards, Grand Award (2007).
- TMMOB Award (2009).
- Nominated for the Astrid Lindgren Memorial Award by Turkey, 2011.
