= Fulla (doll) =

Islamic fashion doll

- A 2006 Winter Collection Fulla doll
- Type: Doll
- Company: NewBoy
- Country: Syria
- Availability: 2003–present
- Slogan: "Arab Girl's Dream Doll"

Fulla (Arabic: فُلَّة) is the name of an 11.5 in (290 mm) Barbie-like fashion doll marketed to children of Islamic and Middle-Eastern countries as an alternative to Barbie. The product's concept evolved around 1999, and it became available for sale in late 2003. Fulla was created by a Syrian manufacturer called NewBoy FZCO. In 2015, the company moved to the United Arab Emirates and is now located in Dubai. Fulla was also sold in China (where it attracts children of the Hui minority), in Brazil, North Africa, Egypt, India (Indian Fulla wears sarees) and Indonesia, while a few were sold in the United States. Although there had been many other dolls in the past that were created with a hijab, such as Razanne and Moroccan Barbie, Fulla surpassed them in popularity due to launching alongside a marketing campaign aired on the popular Arabic television channel Spacetoon. Fulla was a role-model to some Muslim people, displaying how many Muslim parents would prefer their daughters to dress and behave.

== History ==
Fulla was created by the Syria-based company NewBoy Design Studio and launched in November 2003.

By 2005, the Fulla doll had replaced most of the Barbie dolls in Middle Eastern countries' toy stores. Many other products carrying the Fulla brand (breakfast cereals, chewing gums, bicycles, ...) were released. Other Muslim dolls were already being marketed (by Mattel among others).

== Appearance ==
At first, Fulla was developed to have long coal black hair streaked with auburn and brown eyes, but later, dolls with lighter hair and eyes were introduced. The product development team considered about 10 different faces before deciding on her look. She was dressed in a black abaya and head scarf for the Saudi market, but no veil in other markets; because the product development didn't want to "go to extremes". For more liberal countries, Fulla has a white scarf and pastel coat. Her outdoor clothes have since become more colorful, but her shoulders are always covered, and the skirt always falls below her knees, as traditionally Muslim women are expected to dress conservatively, she also never wears a bikini. She can also be found wearing half- and quarter-sleeve dresses, but not sleeveless.

== Islamic values ==
She is named for a fragrant jasmine flower found only in the Middle East. Her personality was designed to be "loving, caring, honest, and respect[ing of] her mother and father. She's good to her friends. She's honest and doesn't lie. She likes reading. She also likes and admires sophisticated fashion." Fulla has two best friends, Yasmeen (dirty blonde hair) and Nada (dark red hair), as well as a little brother and sister. An older protective brother was in development for her but was never released, as well as a teacher and doctor Fulla that are yet to be released, which are two careers that Fulla's creators believe to be respectable. Fulla will not have a boyfriend, because traditional Muslims do not believe in romantic relationships out of wedlock. Fulla's creators believe that Muslim parents become angry by the Western-inspired changes in views on sexuality, especially outside of marriage, meaning that Fulla is supposed to show traditional Islamic values and social order. She does, however, have many costumes, in addition to the hijab, that reflect the everyday wear of Muslim girls nowadays in some Middle Eastern countries that conform to Muslim values, yet are still considered fashionable in the West.

== Advertising ==
In Saudi Arabia, animated commercials display Fulla's life, such as showing the doll reciting her morning fajr, baking a cake to surprise her friend, or reading a book at bedtime. Abidin says that these scenes are "designed to convey Fulla's values" and show what behavior Fulla is promoting. Often, her commercials begin with her singing in a high voice in Arabic: "She will soon be by my side, and I can tell her my deepest secrets". Another series of commercials advertise her to be family-orientated, showing a group of Syrian actresses displaying Fulla silverware, stationery, and accessories. Fulla's commercials often promote modest outfits, such as one which warned, "When you take Fulla out of the house, don't forget her new spring abaya!"

== Comparison to Barbie ==
Fulla and Barbie are about the same height. Differences between them include lifestyle, appearance, and influence by current cultures. Fulla's activities mostly include shopping, spending time with her friends, cooking, reading, and praying. Barbie dolls come in a wide range of hobbies and careers. According to the brand manager at NewBoy, there will be a doctor and a teacher Fulla in the future, as "these are two respected careers for women that we would like to encourage small girls to follow."

Although they both have a wide range of clothes, furniture, jewelry, and other equipment, Fulla's outdoor clothes do not include swimwear or anything similarly revealing. Skirts are longer than knee-length, and Fulla's shoulders are always covered. Where Barbie dolls are made 'nude' beneath their clothes, Fulla's body has a vest and shorts painted on. Compared to Barbie's curves, thin legs and large breasts, Fulla has a smaller chest, is thinner and maybe younger than Barbie. While the standard Barbie has blonde hair, blue eyes and fair skin, the standard Fulla has dark hair, brown eyes and olive skin. Despite this, they are both criticized "for presenting the same unrealistic idea of beauty ... a certain image for women to conform to." Fulla was actually once described to be the physical antithesis of Mattel's Barbie.

Fulla was designed to promote Muslim values and be a role model for Muslim girls worldwide, whereas Barbie is targeted to Americans. Fulla has no male companion whereas Barbie has Ken.

== Popularity ==
Fulla was sold with a line of accessories, including umbrellas, watches, bicycles, corn flakes, cameras, CD players, inflatable chairs, and swimming pools. She was designed to be unlike Barbie and to be the traditional Muslim woman whose life revolves around home and family. Some Muslim parents have claimed that if girls dress their dolls in headscarves, they will be more encouraged to wear a hijab themselves. Fulla has been praised as giving girls a Muslim role model.

In many of the countries in which the doll was sold, Fulla was relatively expensive at about $10 for the standard doll. Because of this, NewBoy created a cheaper version of the doll called Fulla Style. In 2015 NewBoy came with a reboot version of the Fulla doll also known as Generation #5 that is sold from 2016 to present day.

== Fulla magazine ==
NewBoy library is considered the electronic portal to access all educational materials such as "books and electronic magazines" related to NewBoy products like Fulla for example.

Launched in October 2006, the monthly Fulla magazine is published in Arabic and is targeted at young girls up to twelve years of age.

The 48-page magazine covers several topics, stories, and activities. Over 45,000 copies are distributed throughout the Persian Gulf region and the Levant.

== See also ==
- Sara and Dara dolls
- Barbie
- Jamila
- Fashion doll
- Razanne
- Saghira
