= Cemal =

Cemal is the Turkish spelling of the Arabic masculine given name Jamal (Arabic: جَمَال jamāl) which means "beauty, charm".

People named Cemal include:

== First name ==
- Cemal Erçman (1896/1904–?), Turkish weightlifter
- Cemal Gürsel (1895–1966), Turkish army general and fourth President of Turkey
- Cemal Nalga (born 1987), Turkish basketball player
- Cemal Oğuz (born 1980), Turkish judoka
- Cemal Pasha (1872–1922), Ottoman military leader
- Cemal Reşit Eyüpoğlu (1906–1988), Turkish politician and journalist
- Cemal Reşit Rey (1904–1985), Turkish composer
- Cemal Süreya (1931–1990), Turkish writer
- Cemal Yıldırım (1925–2009), Turkish philosopher

== Middle name ==
- Ahmed Cemal Eringen (1921–2009), Turkish- American engineering scientist
- Feridun Cemal Erkin (1899–1980), Turkish diplomat and politician
- Ulvi Cemal Erkin (1906–1972), Turkish composer
