= Jamila (doll) =

Model of children's doll made by Simba Toys

- First appearance: 2006
- Created by: Simba Toys Middle East

In-universe information
- Species: Fashion Doll
- Gender: Female
- Family: closest family consists of husband Jamil and the two little children
- Children: Asad and Almira

Jamila (English: beautiful) is the name of a fashion doll marketed to children in the Middle East. Challenging the already extant leading Muslim fashion doll Fulla, the 11.5 inch Jamila was launched by Simba Toys Middle East in October 2006.

== History ==
Starting off as a single but supposedly truly Arabic doll with dark hair, thick eyebrows and brown eyes, Jamila was launched wearing a black Abaya. Together with two other female dolls and one male doll, marketed as her best friends and her soon-to-be husband (Jamil), it hit the market with an exclusive point-of-sale promotion in Carrefour outlets throughout the Middle East. Since its launch the range of items has increased not only by girls' accessories and dolls' clothing, single items of the Jamila brand have also become available at other retail outlets.

Besides her original definition as a self-confident, young Arabic woman with stereotypically "female" fashion fads, the doll's marketing story's character later was portrayed as having married and styled as care-giver for young family members – two baby dolls have been added two the product line (named Asad and Almira by the company).

== Manufacturer & Distributor ==
Jamila was created by Simba Toys Middle East, which is a subsidiary of the German-based Simba-Dickie Group.

== Clothing and Accessories ==
The Jamila line offers various accessories, such as shoes, jewelry, make up set, mobile phone and others.
