= List of Dispatches episodes =

A list of Dispatches episodes shows the full set of editions of the Channel 4 investigative documentary series Dispatches.

There have been thirty seven seasons of Dispatches. Main reporters include Antony Barnett

== Episodes ==
=== 1987 ===
- 30 October The Plutonium Black Market, about nuclear latency; Sandy Spector; Argentina had allegedly tried to establish a nuclear weapons program in the early 1980s, allegedly developing a weapon in 1983 and allegedly its second in 1986; a youthful-looking Hans Blix, the Swedish director of the International Atomic Energy Agency in Austria; Roger Richter, an IAEA inspector from 1978 to 1981; most commercial sources of plutonium were in Europe; Paul Leventhal of the Nuclear Control Institute; in 1965, 240 kg of enriched uranium was diverted from an American site to Israel, known as the Apollo affair, and from the Kerkira ship in 1968; Israel is thought to have set up the world nuclear black market; in 1980 Iraq set up a nuclear weapons program, which was investigated by Mossad; on 7 June 1981 Israel F-16 aircraft destroyed the Iraq nuclear site, known as Operation Opera, with the site now known as Tuwaitha Nuclear Research Center; Sadiq al-Mahdi, Prime Minister of Sudan, and foreign trading of nuclear material in Sudan; Assem Kabashi of Sudan; Israel had a nuclear plant in Dimona; Nuclear Emergency Support Team (NEST) was at Andrews Air Force Base. Produced by Claudia Milne, made by Twenty Twenty Television. Discussed in the House of Lords on 25 November 1987 by Lord Jenkins of Putney
- 11 December The Kimberley Carlile Inquiry, a docudrama written and produced by Jon Blair about a public inquiry of the conduct of Greenwich social services by Louis Blom-Cooper, featuring Daniel Day-Lewis, Anna Massey and Zoë Wanamaker

=== 1988 ===
- 22 January Danger: Men at Work, about sexual harassment of women at work; the film 'Business as Usual' about a clothing store in Liverpool, with Glenda Jackson, later a Labour MP; Alice Mahon, Labour MP; 25 year old Karen Wileman, an electronics assembly worker in Hampshire, was sacked when she told her employer, 44-year-old Raymond Atthill, that she was taking him to court for sexual harassment, over four years, which she won at an industrial tribunal in Southampton on 4 March 1987; her company offered her £5 in compensation; Vivian Gay and the Porcelli v Strathclyde Regional Council by Jean Porcelli, a laboratory technician from Mount Florida, at Bellahouston Academy in Glasgow, winning on 31 January 1986, on appeal, after first losing the tribunal in April 1984; Dorothy Fall received £3,000 in compensation on 21 November 1986, from taking Lothian Community Relations Council, in Edinburgh, to court; Denise Kingsmill, Baroness Kingsmill; sexual harassment was difficult to fund to take to a tribunal; the Dutch government had formed a national advice centre entitled 'Hands Off'; sexual harassment of nurses had occurred at a former hospital at Brandesburton; Clare Ruhemann of the Labour Research Department; Sarah Howard of the Association of Scientific, Technical and Managerial Staffs. Reported by Sarah Temple-Smith, produced by Philip Clarke, directed by Dennis Jarvis, made by Diverse Productions
- 12 February Iran, reported by Tim Hodlin
- 4 March Radioactive Britain, discussed in parliament a week later
- 15 April Talking to the Terrorists, about the Red Army Faction, it featured Astrid Proll
- 27 May NATO's Nuclear Programme, it featured the Women's Defence Dialogue, a European group of women, who investigated short-range nuclear weapons
- 3 June Illegal Betting, filmed in a Liverpool pub, illegal betting was thought to be worth £400m to £600m a year
- 10 June What's Best for Children: Coventry, about how, or if, Coventry social services investigated sexual abuse of children, notably of male parents with previous convictions for that offence
- 1 July The Hashish Connection, Christopher Wenner reported from Lebanon, where over two years, he found that 80% of the economy of the Beqaa Valley originated from cannabis, and much of Lebanon's wealth had a similar origin
- 12 October Trouble on the Waterfront, about the proposed Dock Work Bill, discussed in parliament on 17 April 1989 by Michael Meacher and again on 24 May 1989

=== 1989 ===
- 15 February Afghan, American Jeff B. Harmon and British Alexander Lindsay filmed four months in Afghanistan in 1988
- 5 April Chico, about the Brazilian Chico Mendes, filmed over several years by Adrian Cowell, about the Brazilian campaigner against deforestation of the Amazon rainforest
- 19 April The Most Neglected Crime, four out of ten women had received an unwanted obscene phone call, but a police superintendent could not recall one individual being prosecuted for that offence in 23 years; the crime was not unlike how internet scammers work today; new digital made tracing numbers much quicker; in the US caller ID of unknown callers was being introduced; this would occur in the UK after around five years
- 10 May The Sins of the Fathers, in January 1990 there would be the 1990 Commonwealth Games in New Zealand, so how would events occur for the prime minister David Lange in 1990. He was forced to resign three months later in August 1989
- 17 May Not What the Doctor Ordered, featuring David Willetts of the Centre for Policy Studies, and a new White Paper on health
- 24 May Warlord of Kayan, made by Jeff Harmon and Alexander Lindsay, about Afghanistan
- 28 June A State of Decay; Belfast had the highest ownership per capita of BMW cars in the UK; Paddy McGrory; Dennis Faul of Dungannon, headteacher of St Patrick's Academy, Dungannon; British soldiers were first brought in to protect Catholic families; since 1968, 2750 people had been killed, with around 1500 killed in the years of 1969-71 alone; Ronald Funston was ambushed by the IRA at around 8am in March 1984, in Pettigo, County Fermanagh; Susan Murphy; the peace lines of Belfast; X-ray photographs at the Royal Victoria Hospital, Belfast; the local building industry had protection rackets of extortion payments, around 15% per contract; Chief Superintendent Eric Anderson of the RUC; David McKittrick; Sylvia Deacon, whose husband in the UDF was killed; the Ballygawley bus bombing in August 1988; Joyce McCarten, whose 17-year-old son was shot by a Protestant group in 1987; Ken Maginnis; Craigavon and a fan belt factory; German factory director Thomas Niedermayer was kidnapped by the IRA in 1973, and killed; his killing was arranged by his former factory employee, trade unionist Brian Keenan (Irish republican); since the Stormont government was suspended in 1972, local councils had executive functions no greater than the operation of leisure centres or bin collection, such as district councils in England; Unionist Reg Empey, the Lord Mayor of Belfast; Alasdair McDonnell; North Down was Northern Ireland's equivalent of wealthy Surrey, in England. Narrated by Jeremy Bugler, directed by Andrew Forrester, made by Fulmar Television
- 12 October The Day of the Technopath, about computer data protection in the UK; former computer programmer Emma Nicholson, Baroness Nicholson of Winterbourne; Mel Croucher; computers were now running industry; Britain had more personal computers per person than any European country; Jan Hruska (computer security) and Ken Wong, and computer viruses; Mark Drew of IBM North Harbour, north of Portsmouth; Tony Cleaver, chief executive of IBM UK; the Datacrime virus; a penetration test; Trevor Nicholas, chief information officer of Barclays Bank; Peter Sommer; Stephen Gold; Judith Vincent of the CBI; Det Supt Don Randall of the City of London Police Fraud Squad; City of London foreign exchange transactions were £200bn per day; the Computer Misuse Act 1990 would soon pass through parliament, but not enough British police knew anything significant about computer security. Reported by Tony Cook, produced by John Goddard, directed by Dominic Cameron, made in association with Gamma TV
- 18 October No, Prime Minister, a docudrama about the 1986 Commonwealth Heads of Government Meeting in early August 1986, to discuss sanctions on South Africa; Margaret Thatcher was played by Irene Sutcliffe, and Robert Mugabe by Norman Beaton
- 8 November In the Coal Hole, discussed in parliament on 16 January 1990, by Alan Meale and Harry Barnes
- 15 November The False Confession File, about obtaining confessions, and the right to remain silent in police interview suites
- 22 November Hungarians Not Comrades, about the sudden collapse of Communist rule
- 13 December Privatising Poland, a team from the Adam Smith Institute visit Poland, to give a rapid course in privatisation, and free market economics; inflation in Poland was 40% per month
- 20 December Road to Damascus, about the investigation of Bert Ammerman, who lost his brother, and other victims' relatives, into the Lockerbie incident of Pan Am Flight 103

=== 1990 ===
- 3 January The Plunderers, an investigation by Christopher Wenner into the looting of Mayan artefacts in Guatemala
- 10 January Murder By Microbe, about possible military biological university research in the UK, with the Campaign against Military Research on Campus, and the Microbiology department of the University of Birmingham
- 17 January Gamma Alarm, about the passage of the Food Safety Bill through the Commons, which eventually became the Food Safety Act 1990, the actress Jenny Seagrove spoke for 'Parents for Safe Food', and Donald Louria spoke about food irradiation
- 31 January Miracle Molecule, about antineoplastic resistance in methods to eliminate cancer cells, and the discovery of the P-glycoprotein in cancer cells, and the effects of verapamil and nifedipine on cancer cells; cancer cells had glutathione S-transferase to resist being eliminated, which was investigated by Roland Wolf at the Edinburgh Cancer Research Centre; an American team was looking at hexamethylene bisacetamide (HMBA) to switch off cancer cells, also later featured in an Equinox documentary on 9 December 1990.
- 7 March A Greater Germany; Karl Marx Platz in Leipzig, now Augustusplatz, where an important demonstration took place on 9 October 1989, and a speech by Willy Brandt, German chancellor from 1969 to 1974; Theo Waigel, Federal Ministry of Finance (Germany) from 1989 to 1998, of the CSU; novelist Günter Grass, formerly of Danzig, now in Poland, and believed in a confederation of Germany, not a united Germany, as he did not want any 'mistakes' of recent German history to be repeated; Andreas Müller, SPD leader in Leipzig, and that the SPD did not favour reunification; a campaign video of The Republicans (Germany), with Also sprach Zarathustra, who supported the repatriation of non-Germans; in south east Bavaria, 20 miles from Austria, the Republicans gained 22% of the vote, the largest in Germany, and held their annual conference in early 1990, for 2000 people; Franz Schönhuber was the Republicans' leader, who was in the Waffen-SS in the Second World War; Reinhard Rade was in the East German part of the Republicans, in Leipzig; in the 1989 European elections in June 1989, the Republicans gained 7.1% of the vote, giving them 6 seats; 5% was needed before any seats could be allocated; after the war, Pomerania, in the north, and Silesia, in the south, were taken by Poland, and a new Germany–Poland border was placed along the north–south Oder–Neisse line, by the Potsdam Agreement; the Republicans were not allowed to take part in the 1990 East German general election, in March 1990; Reinhard Rade described the CDU as communists; East German Wolfgang Ullmann, of the Greens, a government minister of the former East Germany, believed that the Republicans had a likeness to the formation of the former Nazi movement; two million Germans were in the Federation of Expellees, the BdV, which originated from the Flight and expulsion of Germans (1944–1950); Hans Klein (politician) of the CSU, was Federal Minister for Special Affairs of Germany from 1989 to 1990, and part of the Sudeten BdV, with around twenty German MPs in the BdV; the BdV was partly funded, £7m, by the Federal Ministry of the Interior (Germany); Herbert Czaja of the CDU and BdV; Hartmut Koschyk, general secretary of the BdV, later the CSU; the BdV published the 'Deutscher Ostdienst' each week; Hans Modrow, the last head of East Germany had no difficulty with the East German - Poland border in 1990; Michael Lohr, of the BdV, who described East Germany as 'Middle Germany' (Mitteldeutschland), a title also referred to by the Republicans, and did not like the East German - Poland border; the German Social Union (East Germany), or DSU, the East German group of the CSU, from 1990 also started to describe this area as Mitteldeutschland; Georg Martsch, of the BdV, in Silesia, believed that Silesia was part of Germany; groups of Germans were now legally allowed meet together in the former German parts of Poland; Janusz Onyszkiewicz, of the German government, later the Minister of Defence, in Poland; Ulrich Ramm, economist of Commerzbank, and whether Germany could buy back parts of Poland; military historian General Franz Uhle-Wettler, and what NATO represented to Germany; Peter Glotz of the SPD; former chancellor Brandt strongly believed in a united Germany, and a united Europe as well. Made by TVF Media
- 14 March Gerry, about infiltration of the IRA; the IRA informer came from Strabane in County Tyrone, on the border with the Republic; in his teens, he met an IRA operative in the Vaccaro restaurant in Strabane, and was asked to watch the Gough Barracks; a few months later, the IRA raided Gough Barracks, on a Saturday, dressed as soldiers, restraining the sentry, and taking hundreds of rifles; in October on a Sunday at 3.45am, there was an attack on an army depot in Omagh, where fifteen IRA terrorists climbed over the wall, with knives, and captured the sentry, who was able to sound the alarm, two of the IRA were shot and wounded; both raids were planned on the informer's information, whilst he was at school; he now realised what he had caused, so told his family (Catholic) who passed it on to the police, who interviewed him; he was watched by security services when leaving the Pallidrome club at the weekend in Strabane, where he was asked to physically point out his IRA contacts; on 1 January 1957 twelve IRA terrorists drove up through Brookeborough, driving past an army barracks, where the terrorists fired at a policeman, and threw grenades, but were ambushed when a machine gun opened up directly at them, and two terrorists were killed, and the others mostly badly injured; the raid was investigated by James Baker of The Fermanagh Herald, who presumed that the army knew when the raid would take place; the IRA ended the border campaign on army barracks, in July 1962; in August 1969 the Troubles began, and the original IRA, was superseded when the militant Provisional Army Council was formed in January 1970; the informer had joined the Army in England in 1957, but by 1970 had left, and now worked for a building firm, when he was approached by the security services, where he was paid £2000 for five days work, and worked for the security services for the next year, giving information of the structure of the terrorist groups, and the hierarchy. On 21 July 1972, 22 terrorist bombs killed nine civilians; in 1972, there were 468 deaths in the Troubles; the security services now believed that terrorist attacks were planned for England, the informer had not heard anything; he was told to go to the Goldhawk pub in London, where he met Eddie O'Neill; the informer later left working for the security services, but two terrorists, Hugh Doherty and Edward Butler, had been watched in Glasgow, and the security services needed to know their whereabouts in London, so the informer proposed looking for them in Cricklewood, the Half Moon and the Goldhawk; the informer found Butler in a London pub, who was watched, later strafing Scott's restaurant, and taking part in the Balcombe Street siege, where the two were caught with Hugh Duggan and Joe O'Connell. Produced by Peter Williams and Malcolm Brinkworth, directed by Bruce Macdonald, made by Touch Productions and TVS Television
- 28 March In The Name Of Hunger, about Northampton charity World Vision, and that it did not pass money on to Third World projects; the charity said that the documentary cost them £2m in donations
- 11 April Terms for Peace, about possibilities on negotiations in Northern Ireland; four soldiers were killed in County Down on Monday 9 April 1990; Margaret McCann, former wife of Dan McCann; Sinn Féin councillor Fra McCann believed that the only way of removing the British from Northern Ireland was armed force; Sinn Féin leader Martin McGuinness was looking for discussion; the British Army was stepping up surveillance, with frequent roadside checks; Eamonn Mallie; David Hearst of The Guardian; civilian casualties of IRA attacks were increasing, killing 35 civilians in the previous two years; Edward Daly (bishop); the IRA would break into people's houses, in the evening, and take the family car, and physically intimidate the family, being near enough taken hostage; Sinn Féin annual conference in Dublin. Reported by Mary Holland, produced by David Cox and Stewart Lansley, directed by Andy Mayer, made by Juniper. Conservative MP Peter Temple-Morris complained that Channel 4 had given Gerry Adams an actor's voice, to circumvent the broadcasting ban on the IRA.
- 2 May Most Neglected Crime, about obscene phone calls, an updated version of a documentary shown in 1989; British Telecom would not appear in the original documentary, but did in this; over eight million obscene and threatening phone calls were made to women in the UK each year
- 16 May Romanian Roulette, with Silviu Brucan of the National Salvation Front (Romania)
- 6 June The Stasi Tapes, about the East German Stasi, repeated in April 1991
- 3 October Listen to the Children; in October 1987 children were removed from the Broxtowe estate in Nottingham, in connection with child sexual abuse, amongst bizarre sinister practices such as ritualistic slaughter; Judith Dawson, Joan Taylor, Chris Johnston, and Lesley Hughes of Nottinghamshire County Council social services; nine people were jailed on 19 January 1989; the report was published in January 1990, which possibly underestimated what had taken place, claiming that children were brainwashed; Prof John Newson of the University of Nottingham; Mary Midgley. Reported by Bea Campbell, directed by Claire Walmsley. Nottinghamshire County Council was looking at taking legal action against Channel 4.
- 17 October Bad Meat Trail, about the meat trade
- 12 December Against the Odds, about corruption in betting. On 18 December 1990 an Early Day Motion was tabled in parliament by William McKelvey. In December 1992 Satellite Information Services received libel damages from Channel 4, after Dispatches alleged that the company altered starting prices.

=== 1991 ===
- 20 March Keep On Running, about Chris Brasher and the London Marathon, and John Disley, and ADT. Brasher tried to take out a High Court injunction, reported by Duncan Campbell (journalist); Police subsequently investigated about fraud and false accounting; in May 1995, the two sued Channel 4 for libel, and received £1.1m; £380,000 of that was for damages, which was believed to be the most that a television company had paid for in a libel case. George Carman represented Brasher, and Mark Waller (judge) decided.
- 12 June The Movement, about a group in the Conservative Party in the early 1990s; the Braganza Wine Bar in Soho, and the National Association of Conservative Graduates, and their monthly meeting; two speakers are from the Bruges Group - Bill Cash and Alan Sked from the LSE; Marc Glendening believed that the Conservative party should split, and pro-European Conservative MPs could join the Lib Dems; Nick Kent, who worked for Michael Mates; Julian Critchley; the Movement had been formed at the University of St Andrews in Scotland in the early 1970s; Mark McGregor of Pulse; David Hoyle, who worked through David Carlisle; Russell Walters of the Adam Smith Institute; Douglas Smith; Le Casino restaurant in Lower Sloane Street in Chelsea, near the 151 nightclub in Kings Road, owned by Toby Baxendale; the Committee for a free Britain was funded by David Hart, a property developer; a youthful John Bercow at the Federation of Conservative Students meeting at Loughborough University in 1984, attended by The Movement, which included some known as the 'Dundee Monsters'; the meeting featured on the front pages of 'The Sun' and 'Daily Mirror'; the FCS was closed in 1986; Michael Forsyth was made chairman of the Scottish Conservatives by Mrs Thatcher; Derek Bateman; Kathy Short; Grover Norquist; Andrew Barnett of the Scottish Conservative students; Biggar, South Lanarkshire, was where the pro-European Scottish Conservatives met, and at Duddingston; John Guthrie (politician); Michael Forsyth is sacked by Mrs Thatcher; Teddy Taylor warns that 80% of laws are originated in Europe; a youthful Murdo Fraser, chairman of the Young Conservatives; Adrian Goulbourn of the Scottish Young Conservatives; Lloyd Beat, who won 31% of the vote in 1992 in Tweeddale, Ettrick and Lauderdale. Produced by David Kemp, directed by Adrian Milne, made by Hyndland Television. Michael Forsyth sued Channel 4 for libel, and tried to have an injunction on the documentary being shown again. Mr Forsyth received damages in October 1992.
- 2 October The Committee, about Northern Ireland, and the Ulster Central Co-ordinating Committee. Made by Sean McPhilemy of Box Productions. The UVF described the documentary as 'black propaganda'. In September 1992 the main researcher was charged with perjury, and Box Productions were fined £75,000 at the High Court. It was discussed in parliament on 17 December 1992 by David Trimble. 'The Sunday Times' had a 9 May 1993 article about this episode, which claimed it was a hoax. David Trimble tabled an EDM on 6 July 1994. It was a highly controversial programme, that attracted attention ten years later, and 30 March 2000, the producer received £145,000 in libel at the London High Court, from the people who claimed the documentary was a hoax.
- 9 October Strange Customs, about drug smugglers receiving inside information from security at Heathrow Airport, about the KLM warehouse, and trafficking cocaine. Reported by Duncan Campbell. Channel 4 told the customs officers about the content of the documentary five minutes before it was broadcast.
- 23 October Every Child in Britain or Education Commission, about how difficult the GCSE exam was to pass; five British educationalists travelled to Holland and Germany, and were told that an eleven year old could pass the GCSE; the UK had recognised excellent sixth-form and university provision; but the other 85% of education was far less proficient; the panel on the programme, of Sig Prais, AH Halsey, Neville Postlethwaite, Alan Smithers and Hilary Steedman unanimously agreed that at age 14 there should be divisions into academic, technical and vocational; the German and Dutch educationists believed that the standard of the GCSE was most suitable for 12 year olds.

=== 1992 ===
- 19 February Beyond Faith, about satanic abuse and sacrifice
- 20 May Body Search, about The Body Shop retail chain. Channel 4 had taken out large half-page adverts in newspapers advertising the Dispatches documentary, asking 'The Body Shop. Are they any better than their rivals, or do they just shout louder?'. Unfortunately, the owners of The Body Shop, 50 year old Anita Roddick and her 51 year old husband, were greatly displeased by the Dispatches documentary and forthwith took Channel 4 to court in July 1993. The Body Shop won the 1993 libel case, winning £276,000 in damages. Costs for the five-week court case were estimated at £1.5 million. It was argued by the prosecution that Channel 4 sought to present The Body Shop as mere hypocrites, and that The Body Shop's commitment to animal welfare was a 'complete sham'. The jury took eleven hours to arrive at a verdict, with a 10–2 majority. Colin Leventhal, of Channel 4, said 'Channel 4 is both disappointed and surprised at the outcome of this case'. The documentary was made by Fulcrum TV.
- 10 June The People of the Shining Path, about the brutal Communist Shining Path (Sendero Luminoso) movement in Peru, discussed in parliament on 9 July 1992 by Ray Whitney, a former diplomat and in the House of Lords on 2 December 1992 by Ian Orr-Ewing, Baron Orr-Ewing
- 4 November Visible Harm?, about pornography, and leading to sexual violence, produced by Anne Ross Muir
- 16 December Dying to Diet, could dieting lead to an early death, notably increased heart disease; Antonia Giovanazzi; Prof David Garner of Michigan State University said that the slimming industry was a 'revolving door' with 95% of customers not ultimately losing much weight; Astrid Longhurst, the Slimcea Girl in 1979, who lost 6.5 stones in six months, but she soon regained around half of that; Prof Janet Polivy of the University of Toronto; Bernice Weston founded the Weight Watchers franchise, with her husband Richard, in the UK in 1967; her brother was a cardiologist; aged 44 her husband died of a heart attack; cardiologist Prof Desmond Julian of the British Heart Foundation; psychologist Kelly D. Brownell; Malaysian Dr I-Min Lee, of the Harvard T.H. Chan School of Public Health, who looked at 12,000 people over 12 years; dieting can encourage the dieter to eat more fat than usual; Nicola Edmans; Prof Michael Oliver (cardiologist) of the Wynn Institute for Metabolic Research, and suitable levels of cholesterol; dieting affected brain chemistry, and therefore mood; Liz Martin; Rosemary Conley and her BBC slimming series; she proposed that metabolic rate could be increased by eating six small meals a day; Prof John Durnin of the University of Glasgow said that one's metabolic rate was determined largely by one's genes; the BHF wrote to British GPs, questioning Rosemary Conley's diet advice on metabolism; Rosemary Conley was presented by the programme makers as a 'quack'; the American Nutrisystem diet; Oregon politician Ron Wyden found that many diet industry representatives, in the US, lacked any type of nutrition education, and were merely sales representatives; Weight Watchers UK had around 3,000 clubs for around 3 million people in the UK, turning over £20m, run by Linda Huett; British GPs would recommend people to Weight Watchers UK; medical psychologist Andrew Hill; the Weight Watchers food products was a quarter of Heinz turnover; Sue Dibb, of The Food Commission; the Committee of Medical Aspects of Food Policy provided most of the advice on food policy to the Department of Health; Labour MP Mo Mowlam; the Conservative government 1992 White Paper The Health of the Nation - a strategy for health in England. Reported by Aric Sigman, produced by Kimi Zabihyan, directed by Carolyn Gilbey, made by Observer Films

=== 1993 ===
- 6 January One Man in Ten, about the sex trade in Birmingham and Edinburgh
- 27 January Fatal Dose, about deaths connected to psychotropic drugs prescribed on the NHS, with research from Prof Malcolm Lader at the Institute of Psychiatry, Psychology and Neuroscience, and Elaine Murphy, Baroness Murphy
- 10 February Other People's Children, about sex tourism in Thailand. An EDM was tabled by David Alton
- 14 April Taxing Times, about the Inland Revenue being intimidating
- 28 April The Samson Unit, about the secretive covert Samson Unit of the Israel Defense Forces Mista'arvim, whereby the Israeli military personnel enter Gaza, dressed convincingly as natives, if required being dressed as women
- 12 May Nuclear Nightmare, about Soviet nuclear testing in Kazakhsta, Kazakhstan was loyal to the Soviet Union, right up until the end; 140 SS-18 missiles were still in Kazakhstan; all tactical nuclear weapons were removed; Nursultan Nazarbayev, President of Kazakhstan from 1991 to 2019; Oumirseric Kasenove, of the Centre of Strategic Studies, in Kazakhstan, and that keeping the nuclear weapons would provide protection; Frank Gaffney of the Center for Security Policy; Olzhas Suleimenov, leader of the anti-nuclear movement in Kazakhstan; Kazakhstan had had over 500 nuclear tests, the most of any country; 70 nuclear tests were released from aircraft at the Semipalatinsk Test Site, in the north-east of Kazakhstan; Kabden Esengarin from Sarzhal, born in 1929; Prof Saim Bulmukhanov of the National Radiology Institute in Almaty, who studied the many health effects; the Minister of Healthcare said it would not be true; Boris Gusev, who worked with people affected by radiation, and from data of the Bureau of National Statistics of the Republic of Kazakhstan, where he found that the death rate for children under the age of 1 was fifteen times higher than typical; economist Chan-Young Bang, from South Korea, of the KIMEP University, who was brought in to help the president; Prof Artjom Arzumanov of the Institute of Nuclear Physics in Alatau, Medeu District, Almaty; Kazakhstan was developing an oil industry; Steven Dolley, of the Nuclear Control Institute; Kazakhstan had a fast-breeder reactor, the BN-350 reactor; Russian Alexei Arbatov, of the Centre for Military Forecasting in Moscow; the Kazakhstan President meets Akbar Hashemi Rafsanjani, the President of Iran in 1992. Narrated by Robin Lustig, produced by Greg Lanning and Phillip Whitehead, made by Brook Associates
- 3 November Who's Minding the Managers?, about stockbrokers in London
- 10 November, about teenagers taking drugs in East London, researched by Claire Hynes, and work by the University of Exeter; children under 14 were affording £100 a week on drugs, often financed by theft, such as breaking into vehicles; drug consumption in that age range had doubled in three years, from research of the Schools Health Education Unit, of the University of Exeter, in Clyst St Mary; Colin Cripps, a youth project manager for Newham borough; Chief Superintendent David Gilbertson of Notting Hill police station, who targeted dealers; family service units provided resources. Reported by Kate Snell, produced by David Souden, directed by Clare Richards, made by Pillarbox
- 24 November No Minister, about HM Treasury; the week before the first unified budget; the forward civil service catering had fictitious employees on the payroll; Sir Michael Scholar was questioned about this at the Public Accounts Committee (United Kingdom) on 15 March 1993 by Sir Michael Shersby and Terry Davis; Sir Kit McMahon; Graham Mather of the European Policy Forum; the State of the Economy conference of the Institute of Economic Affairs (IEA); economist Prof Tim Congdon of Lombard Street Research; Dorneywood in Buckinghamshire, the county residence of the Chancellor of the Exchequer; Bryan Gibson of Hampshire and unit fines, which were trialled from 1992 to 1993; the cathedral city of Lincoln, and a meeting about the former Child Support Agency; the CSA was set up to find the 70% of absent fathers who contributed nothing to a child's finances; the Children Come First white paper; Prof Jonathan Bradshaw; Sir Howard Davies (economist), Director-General of the CBI; economist Dame Diane Coyle and inherent secrecy; Sir Peter Kemp and bunker mentality; economist Prof Paul Ormerod, of the University of Manchester, and the lack of any industrial experience; the Learning to Succeed report of the National Commission on Education, of the Paul Hamlyn Foundation; Claus Moser, Baron Moser advised more investment in education; economist Nicholas Barr and Iain Crawford of the LSE, and student loans; the private finance initiative was being developed; the Panel of Independent Forecasters, known as the 'Seven Wise Men'; economist Sir Alan Walters; Sir Samuel Brittan and the Department of Economic Affairs, formed in 1964; Nigel Lawson believed that the Bank of England should become independent; the Next Steps proposed system of devolution to operational agencies. Narrated by Paul Wallace, directed by Andy Stevenson, made by Realtime Television
- 1 December The Doughty Street Papers, about the 'Aims of Industry' group. An EDM was tabled by Chris Mullin, claiming that the organisation was a 'front' for the Conservative party
- 15 December All Our Futures: A Disaster of Epic Proportions?, about post-16 vocational education in the UK, that the new NVQs for distinct careers such as plumbing and electrical installation (introduced by the National Council for Vocational Qualifications which later became the Qualifications and Curriculum Development Agency in 1997) and GNVQs, for wider subjects such as business were not adequate, and had substituted flexibility for rigour; GNVQs were intended to be a type of A-level course, but in a vocational subject; a report was commissioned for Channel 4, funded by the Gatsby Charitable Foundation, and made by Alan Smithers, of the University of Manchester, called 'All Our Futures - Britain's Education Revolution'; the NVQ revolution had suffered from mission creep, and had refused to have syllabus lists for individual courses, or textbooks; candidates for each NVQ were largely asked to complete a set of tasks, and often nothing else; the NVQ had been developed around student-centered learning, and lacked much rigour, with few written tests; previous City and Guilds courses had much more rigour; college NVQ courses were funded by local TECs; in the documentary Prof Smithers took teachers from Barking and Dagenham to Germany, France and Switzerland, where the teachers found that similar age trainees in these countries were maybe two or three years ahead of trainees in the UK, and taught more essential subjects, such as more Maths.

=== 1994 ===
- 16 February Getting away with rape, a one-hour special; David Martin Maloney was convicted of multiple rapes, in July 1993, often by taking the victim in his car; Keith Matthewman; in December 1993, 33 year old Nicholas Edwards was acquitted of rape for the fifth time, being accused of raping a 26 year old nurse in July 1992; he also had multiple rape convictions going back to 1982 but would be sentenced to life in September 2000; Det Supt Bill Grahamslaw of the Metropolitan Police; forensic psychologist Prof David Canter of the University of Surrey; Prof Sue Lees of the University of North London; Anne Davies of the Metropolitan Police; Nemone Lethbridge; in 1993 over 4,500 women reported rape in England and Wales, leading to 482 convictions. Reported by Jenny Cuffe, produced by Jacqui Webster, directed by Lynn Ferguson, made by First Frame. The University of North London estimated that nine in ten rapes were not reported, as six out of seven women raped were by people that they knew beforehand. In the survey, 11% of rapes took place in the assailant's car; for rapes by strangers the conviction rate was 100%, in the survey, by 36% for acquaintance rapists. In court, these acquaintance rapists claim that the woman consented, and the jury believed this in two-thirds of such cases. In the university study, a defendant went to the same court four times in the same month, for the same offence of rape, and was acquitted three of those times; the jury had not been told of the other three cases taking place that month. An EDM was tabled in parliament on 23 February 1994 by Mildred Gordon.
- 23 February Jayne's Journey, about murderers with mental conditions, made by Jayne Zito, with an interview with health secretary Virginia Bottomley
- 16 March A Danger To Health. An EDM was tabled in parliament by Alan Keen on 17 March 1994.
- 30 March Les Enfants Terrible, about the De Geyter school in Saint-Denis, Seine-Saint-Denis, with social difficulties
- 13 April Pocket Neutron, about Russian scientists and red mercury. Discussed in the House of Lords on 11 May 1994 by Hugh Jenkins, Baron Jenkins of Putney
- 20 April Baby's Sweet Tooth, about children's sweet drinks causing tooth decay; it featured the Infant Drinks Litigation Group, of the Law Society; Milupa (Nutricia) had to pay out large amounts of compensation in Germany; SmithKline Beecham had to pay out compensation in 1991 for Baby Ribena
- 18 May The Pill Generation, featured Valerie Beral of Cancer Research and Klim McPherson (husband of Ann McPherson) of the London School of Hygiene & Tropical Medicine, about the possible risks of the contraceptive pill
- 26 October Terror on the Doorstep, about the BNP and Combat 18
- 23 November Spy in the Camp, about whether MI5 significantly influenced the 1984 Miners strike; Stella Rimington gives the BBC Richard Dimbleby Lecture in June 1994; Seumas Milne, Labour Correspondent of The Guardian; Harry Newton, a personal friend of Arthur Scargill, named as an MI5 agent by Cathy Massiter, herself once in MI5; Harry Newton worked for F Branch, the anti-subversion division of MI5; F Branch investigated CND, Liberty and the British Communist Party; Robin Robinson of the Joint Intelligence Committee; Stella Rimington operated F Branch, and the F2 unit, which investigated subversive trade unions, and planted agents; Michael Bettaney, the Cambridge- graduate MI5 agent who was convicted for passing sensitive information to the Soviets; Bettaney gave information that the NUM was being tracked by MI5; Operation Tinkerbell was MI5's communication surveillance of the NUM; GCHQ, in Cheltenham, conducted communication surveillance of the NUM in the strike; NUM offices had surveillance of their telephones; Arthur Scargill; Labour MP Mick Clapham, who worked for the NUM during the strike; Alain Simon, French general secretary from 1980 to 1985 of the Trade Unions International of Miners, who informed the NUM of an agent; Peter Heathfield general secretary from 1984 to 1992 of the NUM, who thought that Roger Windsor, chief executive of the NUM from 1983 to July 1989, could have been an MI5 agent; Scottish Labour MP Jimmy Hood, who was an NUM leader during the 1984 strike; Walter Marshall, Baron Marshall of Goring, chairman from 1982 to 1989 of the CEGB, had made calculations that the NUM would plausibly win their strike around October 1984. Reported by Callum Macrae, produced by Kimi Zabihyan, directed by Michael Davidson, made by Observer Films and Ray Fitzwalter Associates. An EDM was tabled in parliament by George Galloway on 5 December 1994.
- 14 December A Social Disservice, about Lancashire County Council

=== 1995 ===
- 11 January The Torture Trail, exporting torture equipment, it featured the Covert and Operational Procurement Exhibition (COPEX); Helen Bamber of the Medical Foundation for the Care of Victims of Torture, and electroshock weapons; on 12 January 1994, British trade minister Richard Needham pronounced that trade of torture devices should not be allowed; similar to the 'Fake Sheikh', Channel 4 deployed subterfuge; electroshock weapons were banned in the UK in 1988, following robberies with cattle prods, and under section 5 of the Firearms Act 1968; stun guns were made by Nova Technologies of Austin, Texas and Nashville; COPEX was held at the racecourse in Esher; Pierre Sané of Amnesty International; Redress (charitable organisation) investigated torture; the British ARWEN 37 riot gun; a company in Glasgow claimed to make electroshock weapons; the Association of Police and Public Security Suppliers; the Al-Yamamah arms deal was the largest in British defence history; Richard Evans (businessman). Reported by Martyn Gregory, produced by John Fanshawe, made by TVF. An EDM was tabled by Ann Clywd on 16 January 1995 Another EDM was tabled on 29 June 1995, after the reporter sued the government for libel, receiving £55,000. And another EDM on 25 October 1995
- 18 January Serving Two Masters, about junior doctors not being capable, and heart surgeons; 96% of private patients saw a consultant within a month, but only 9% of NHS patients would. Discussed in parliament on 31 January 1995 by Conservative MP James Couchman.
- 25 January Murky Waters, about unclean Blackpool beach; 220 million gallons of sewage entered the sea every day; it featured Steven Myint, of the University of Leicester; virologist Prof Richard Tedder of UCL Hospitals, the son of Arthur Tedder, 1st Baron Tedder, discusses Hepatitis A; Charles Hopkins with legal requirements, and the case of James Andrews, who tried to prosecute Southern Water; the Water Research Centre WRc, made a report, that cleared water companies, and Conservative Atkins accepted it; Prof David Kay; Porthtowan beach; Croyde beach in Cornwall; Oxwich Bay in south Wales, near Swansea; Chris Woolridge, marine geographer at Cardiff University; on February 14, 1994, a Norwich restaurant served infected oysters, and customers received gastroenteritis; John Mulready, chief executive of Jersey Public Services; in Jersey, to prevent contamination, UV light was shone on sewage, to kill bacteria; environmental chemist Gerry Jackson; David de Carteret, of Jersey Tourism; civil engineer Chris Massie; South West Water had a sewage outflow near Godrevy Lighthouse; Bruce Denness, ocean engineer of the University of Portsmouth; Paul Siveter of the Newquay tourist association. Reported by Toby Moore, directed by Tim Pritchard. Discussed in parliament on 26 January 1995 by Welsh Labour MP Nick Ainger.
- 8 March Total Structural Failure, about the MV Derbyshire, which sunk in September 1980
- 15 March Safe or Sorry
- 11 October Making the Grades, it investigated the Schools Curriculum and Assessment Authority (SCAA). The episode received complaints to the Broadcasting Standards Commission, from two examining boards, which were upheld
- 18 October The Care Connection, about the sex trade with under-age girls in Birmingham and Aberdeen
- 29 November New Labour, Old Habits?, about nepotism and interference in the Leicester East constituency, Keith Vaz threatened legal action
- 6 December The Perfect Poison, about ICI at Runcorn

=== 1996 ===
- 17 January The Veal Trail, discussed in parliament on 29 February 1996 by Labour MP Elliot Morley
- 23 January Soccer's Foul Play, an hour long episode about the United Kingdom football sexual abuse scandal; the under-14 squad of Charlton Athletic F.C.; Richard Smith; Ian Ackley of Derbyshire, and his father Frank; former Southampton F.C. trainee Dean Radford; Barry Bennell claimed to be a coach from Manchester City F.C.; Bennell had worked at Stoke City and Crewe Alexandra; Bennell invited 11-year-old boys into his home, to be sexually abused over two to three years; Ken Barnes and Chris Muir of Manchester City; Bennell was at Manchester City for seven years then moved to Crewe Alexandra to work for Dario Gradi; the chairman of Crewe Norman Rowlinson had suspicions of Bennell, and phoned Manchester City to ask if Bennell had been 'mucking about with kids'; Dario Gradi claims to have not heard anything disturbing; Bennell was sacked by Crewe in 1986; Brenda Dawson of Jacksonville, Florida who was hugely suspicious of Bennell when boys from Staffordshire stayed at her home; Bennell is arrested in Florida in 1994; Terry Thomas of Florida Police; Bennell is sent to prison for four years; Libby Senterfit, who jailed Bennell; Keith Ketley abused boys in Ipswich, under a different name, but had a previous conviction for 18 months when in Southend; Alan Girot of Suffolk Football Association; Les Reed of Charlton Athletic; Bob Higgins was at Southampton F.C., where teenage boys would stay at his house; Bob Higgins went to Southampton Court, where he was found not guilty on one charge, and afterwards the other charges were dropped; Kit Carson brought Bob Higgins to Peterborough United F.C. where teenage boys are abused, when boys stayed at his house; Charles Hughes of The Football Association. Reported by Deborah Davies, produced by Bernard Clark, directed by Ed Braman
- 31 January Operation Lottery, about HRT
- 14 February The Power Connection, childhood leukaemia, from electricity power lines or radon gas, from work by the International Journal of Radiation Biology, with work by Prof Denis Henshaw, who worked with the Association for Radiation Research. An EDM was tabled on 14 February 1996 by Paddy Tipping and Conservative Northampton MP Tony Marlow tabled a question in parliament
- 13 March Back on the Torture Trail. An EDM was tabled by Maria Fyfe
- 27 March The Lost Children; the Bristol Royal Infirmary had 500,000 patients a year; 18 month Joshua Loveday was treated in December 1994, to be operated on 12 January 1995; Stephen Bolsin, a consultant anaesthetist had warned about too many fatalities, over five years from 1988; he had arrived from the Royal Brompton Hospital; he spoke to Prof Cedric Prys Roberts, of the University of Bristol, and President from 1994 to 1997 of the Royal College of Anaesthetists; for two types of operation, the atrioventricular septal defect (AV canal) and Tetralogy of Fallot, the hospital unit had high mortality rate; for the arterial switch operation from 1988 to 1989, seven children had died; Sian Collyer, born 18 January 1992 had the operation, and did not survive; Belinda Collyer, from Cheltenham; Michaela and Steve Willis from Devon; Hugh Ross, chief executive of the United Bristol Healthcare NHS Trust; heart surgeon Sir Terence English, President from 1990 to 1992 of the Royal College of Surgeons of England; medical director James Wisheart had the worst surgical results; Sir Terence English alerted the Department of Health, who did nothing for three years; after another death in June 1994, action was taken by the anaesthetist, alongside colleagues Su Underwood, Ian Davies, Steve Pryn, Sally Masey, and Peter Baskett; Bronwen Stewart and her son Ian, brain-damaged by an operation, making him blind and deaf; Prof Gianni Angelini was appointed Professor of Cardiac Surgery at the University of Bristol in 1994, who immediately made changes; Robert Loveday and Mandy Evans. Reported by James Garrett, produced by Tom Archer, directed by Alex Sutherland, made by HTV. In August 1998, the Dispatches team had the idea to make it into a film called Innocents.
- 3 April Acid Test, about military and LSD experiments; Porton Down experimented with it, from 1954
- 24 April The Peace Prize, discussed in the House of Lords on 25 April 1996 by Lib Dem Richard Holme, Baron Holme of Cheltenham
- 1 May Second Class Return, £11bn needed for the UK's railway infrastructure; Sir Bob Reid, former chairman of BR from 1990 to 1995; Tony Bradley of Birmingham Chamber of Commerce; rail transport consultant William Bradshaw, Baron Bradshaw; consultant Bill McMorran; Brian Davies, former chief track engineer of BR Eastern Region; 'Broadway Boogie' by Memphis Slim; electrical engineer and technical writer Richard Hope (1934–2019); William McDonald, who was in the 1996 Stafford rail crash; Peter Rayner, former BR regional manager; the Personal Track Safety (PTS) certificate; investigative reporter Terry Messenger works as a lookout, work was carried out under Railway Group Standards; David Kennedy (economist) of the Centre for Regulated Industries; Prof Tony O'Hagan, of the University of Nottingham, had made an estimate of the expenditure required
- 15 May Class Wars, drama teacher Gill Taylor at Stamford High School in Tameside, now called Great Academy Ashton, had a camera concealed in her bag, it showed terrible rowdy classroom antics, with her being vilely insulted by children, and one boy knocked another unconscious. She resigned in August 1996.
- 22 May The Mahogany Trail, about the illegal trade of wood in Pará in northern Brazil, discussed in parliament on 4 December 1996 by Labour MP Alan Simpson
- 24 October, about exporting parts for R-R Tyne marine engines to Argentina, in return for Argentina letting the UK explore for oil

=== 1997 ===
- 9 January No Angels
- 13 February Crash Landing, about the safety of the RAF, investigated by David Lomax; Flt Lt Simon Burgess, from Grimsby, ejected from his Hawk aircraft on 13 February 1996, but it was too low for the parachute to open, when aged 28; on 23 January 1991 a weapon had exploded on his aircraft, when aged 23 and a Flying Officer, in the Gulf War in Tornado ZA403, with navigator 40-year-old Loughborough University-educated Sqn Ldr Bob Ankerson of 17 Sqn; Ann and Terry Burgess, his parents; the aircraft had had the ailerons disconnected for servicing; the night shift at the base was short of engineering technician staff - it needed 23 but had 13, with 2 electricians instead of 3, 3 weapon technicians instead of 6, and 1 airframe fitter instead of 6; Archie Liggatt, an RAF instructor from 1980 to 1996, now an airliner instructor with Air 2000; not enough documentation was being provided for servicing for aircraft; the 1993 Llyn Padarn helicopter crash on 12 August 1993 in a Westland Wessex, where three teenagers were killed, which was captured on film; the mother of one of the crash victims; the wrong type of grease had been put in the clutch of the tail rotor; Geoffrey Oakden, father of crash victim Mark Oakden; Nicholas Soames on 8 June 1996; Air Vice-Marshal Boz Robinson, station commander from 1978 until March 1980; on 23 January 1996, 28-year-old Flt Lt Greg Noble took off in an RAF Jaguar XX733 of 41 Squadron in Norfolk, after limited flight hours on the aircraft, never engaged the afterburner, collided with a barrier at the end of the runway, and crashed in a fireball; Paul Maynard, RAF pilot from 1980 to 1996, and Ed Smith, RAF pilot from 1976 to 1995; James Archer, RAF Tornado pilot from 1987 to 1996 with 43 Squadron at RAF Leuchars in eastern Scotland, where due to a chronic lack of spare parts for their aircraft, at best there were six serviceable aircraft and at best there would be one serviceable aircraft; Dispatches visited the airfield and did not see any military aircraft flying, apart from the East of Scotland Universities Air Squadron; a current Tornado pilot at RAF Leuchars said that the squadron struggled to get four aircraft into the air, at one time; Air Chief Marshal Sir Bill Wratten wrote a memo indicating that spares holding and available staff were the biggest peacetime risks faced by the RAF; a current technician at RAF St Athan said that, due to a lack of spares, items as small as a split pin, if not in RAF stock, were replaced by an older split pin that was crudely straightened again; aircraft were cannibalised, to keep other aircraft in service, with spare parts, which has long been a widely practised procedure in maintenance; but whilst that has been commonly heavily practised for smaller components, the RAF were now doing this with whole engines; a former RAF electrical technician said that Kapton-insulated wiring was a danger, as in servicing, the insulation can be easily chafed, giving risk to a short circuit; seven miles of Kapton wiring was on the Tornado, and a Tornado crashed on 2 December 1986, east of Wortham, Suffolk next to the A143, due to an electrical fault, watched by children at a local primary school, also seeing the pilots safely eject; the USAF removed Kapton-insulated wiring from 1988, and Canada had also removed it from new aircraft; at RAF Laarbruch, Harrier aircraft had fires, from Kapton-insulated wiring, so the wiring was totally replaced; 22 RAF Tornado aircraft had crashed since the 1991 war. Produced by Terry Kelleher, directed by Julia Stroud, made by Platinum Film & TV Production
- 6 March The Firm, about the ecstasy trade in Essex. Discussed in the House of Lords on 19 March 1997 by Conservative Joyce Anelay, Baroness Anelay of St Johns.
- 13 March Buying Time, about NHS timescales of treatment; Vyv Chatterley, a Bristol hotel owner, the Naseby House Hotel, was diagnosed with breast cancer, which had spread to her liver; she paid privately for the treatment Docetaxel, licensed by the NHS in 1995; oncologist Elisabeth Whipp of the Bristol Royal Infirmary; Pamela Charlwood of the Avon Health Authority; oncologist Prof Karol Sikora; Prof Chris Ham of the University of Birmingham; Susan Edginton of Taunton; Mac Kammerling, of Somerset Health Authority, who would pay for the same treatment; Hugh Ross, chief executive of the United Bristol Healthcare NHS Trust; Gillian Casemore of Tetbury in Gloucestershire, who had the same treatment paid for by her local health authority; 36 year old Lynette Jackson of Wiltshire, who had Paclitaxel, one of many taxane treatments, for ovarian cancer, which Wiltshire would not pay for; Kevin Mochrie, editor of the Swindon Evening Advertiser, who raised money for Lynette; oncologist Marcus Galea of Princess Margaret Hospital, Swindon; Alan Lear, who had MND, with his neurologist, and the treatment riluzole, made by Rhône-Poulenc Rorer, which Avon Health Authority would not pay for, but adequate outcomes were not in full agreement; Lincolnshire viewed the treatment as worthwhile 'as liposuction'; Joan Jaffray had MND; Nick Payne; Kathy Groom, whose husband John had MND; the Avonex treatment, Interferon beta-1a, made by Biogen; Brian Wainwright and the treatment Aricept, Donepezil; Prof Alistair Burns of Withington Community Hospital; Harry Cayton, later the chairman of the National Information Governance Board for Health and Social Care. Reported by Sarah Spiller (the partner of Alex Thomson, of Channel 4 News), produced by Julian Ware and Louise Osmond, directed by Mark Rubens, made by ITN
- 8 May The Blair Project, about the possible direction of Tony Blair; a party in December 1996 hosted by the Sedgefield Labour group; on 26 February 1996 Tony Blair held a day symposium at King's College London, to discuss his project; Paul Thompson, editor of Renewal who claimed that Blair wanted a 'stakeholding economy' and a 'one nation society', and that how Margaret Thatcher had often operated had influenced Tony Blair; Will Hutton, editor of The Observer; Tony Blair's paternal (but not genetic) grandparents came from Govan in Glasgow; Tony Blair's father was fostered to James Blair, and wife Mary, who worked in the nearby shipyards; Tony Blair's real paternal grandparents were an actor and actress (with real surname of Parsons); Tony Blair's father, a university Law lecturer, moved from Communist politics to the Conservative party, and had wanted to be prime minister; the work of John Macmurray greatly influenced Tony Blair; Sir Samuel Brittan; Mary Picken, of Scottish Labour; Tony Blair's former prep school in Durham, and Canon John Grove, his former headteacher; Tony Blair's family moved from Scotland to Australia in 1954, then to High Shincliffe in Durham, where Tony Blair lived from 1958 to 1975; at age 11, his father had a stroke, and when 22, his mother died of cancer; he stood in the 1982 Beaconsfield by-election, gaining many contacts; he met French president Jacques Chirac, as opposition leader, conversing in French; his constituency surgery in Ferryhill, with his agent John Burton; Joel Barnett had also applied for the constituency in 1983, with left-wing Les Huckfield, of the TGWU, the earlier favoured candidate; in 1983, Pat Phoenix, of Coronation Street, was, technically, the step-mother of his wife; the left-wing Scottish Labour MP John McAllion, who left Labour in 2003. Reported by Callum Macrae, produced by Terry Kelleher, directed by David Carr-Brown, made by Psychology News
- 6 November Secrets of the Gaul, about the disappearance of the FV Gaul and that such ships were spying against the Russians. Reported by Roger Fenton.
- 13 November The Lie of the Land, discussed in parliament on 26 March 1999 by Labour MP David Lepper and Labour MP Gordon Prentice

=== 1998 ===
- 29 January Too Much Too Young, about whether children were ready to read at the age of four; in Hungary, children started school at age six; in Belgium, children started at age six; the Hungarian children did much better in the Mathematics SAT test, for ages seven; Graham Last, education inspector in Barking; Sally Ward, speech and language therapist; elementary social skills, such as collaboration, and getting to know others confidently, was taught before any primary education began; educational psychologist Ann Locke; Belgian school inspector Catherine Vrielinck; Prof József Nagy of Attila Jozsef University (University of Szeged) in Hungary, found that most children were ready to write at age six, with some at five, and 15% at age seven; did four year olds, in the UK, have the dexterity to start writing; circle time; Prof Sig Prais; the bottom 30%, and mostly boys, did less well in the UK, than in other countries; Greg Brooks of NFER; the difference was referred to as the Matthew effect. Also broadcast on Teachers TV. Reported by Callum Macrae, directed by David Mills
- 12 March Trust Me I'm a Doctor, about the General Medical Council, and that many banned doctors returned as surgeons
- 26 March Golf Lima Foxtrot about police cars in chases, hitting innocent cars; X-Cars, a documentary about GMP police cars, from July 1991; a pursuit at 118 mph; Fred Broughton, chairman of the Police Federation, and that there was no standard police car training; the Met Police had one session of night time driving training, going to Lakenheath in Suffolk in a Ford Sierra, known as a 'follow'; Dave Rogers of RoSPA; Commander David Ray of the Met Police; the phrase Golf Lima Foxtrot = GLF = 'Go Like F-ck'; since 1996, the Met had trained 2,800 officers, with a three-week course; on Monday 19 June 1995, 27 year old Cambridge orthopaedic nurse Judith Hood was killed, in her Citroën AX when 30 year old Gerard Sharratt, a Met advanced driving trainer, took a corner at around 100 mph, crashing into a set of stationary vehicles at temporary traffic lights on the A10 near Haslingfield in Cambridgeshire; Judith originated from Rowlands Gill; Sharratt was fined £750 and banned for six months at Norwich Court in July 1996, but was removed from Met training; Miami Dade Police Department; Prof Geoffrey Alpert of the University of South Carolina; on Tuesday 16 April 1996, an unmarked police car lost control on the single carriageway A631, and hit a red-coloured Vauxhall Astra van driving the opposite direction, driven by 53 year old Michael Scholes of Tickhill, killing 15 year old Shelley Simmonite of Sandrock Road in Harworth, north Nottinghamshire, who was in the police car, with 31 year old PC Adrian Ward of South Yorkshire Police, and colleague PC John Shuttleworth, at Tickhill, with her 14 year old friend Emma Cubbin, both who attended North Border Comprehensive School in Bircotes; Marie Ellis, mother of Shelley; he was fined £500, and five penalty points; in the Black Country, on 17 December 1995, a police pursuit guided by Bournville Lane station, resulted in 20 year old Neil Homer of Park Avenue in Oldbury, in a white-coloured Vauxhall Nova, being hit side-on by a police Peugeot 405 at 100 mph, which was jumping a red light at the junction of the A4123 Wolverhampton Road with Causeway Green Road in Oldbury, also killing 41 year old Robert Dallow of West Midlands Police, from Great Barr; Dennis and Dianne Homer; Major Allen Kogut of Baltimore Police; Rodney Lind, deputy chief constable of Wiltshire Police; the police were guided by the Roadcraft official publication; 72 year old Nancy Roberts, of St George's Hill in Weybridge, was killed on Woodbridge Road in Guildford on 2 December 1995, hit by a Surrey Police Ford Transit, driven by 29 year old PC David Lange; he attended Chertsey Magistrates on 4 December 1996, accused of death by careless driving; schoolteacher Ian Roberts. Reported by Callum McCrae, produced by Niall Sookoo, directed by Robin Bextor, made by New Wave
- 2 April Granny's Having a Baby, about Britain's oldest mother, 61 year old Liz Buttle
- 16 April Men Behaving Badly, Part 1, about domestic violence, from testimony of 400 women; domestic violence was one third of violent crime; 54% of the women in the survey had been assaulted more than fifty times, becoming worse over time; some women would be attacked every day; a third of children, in the survey, would be attacked; Sue Lees of the University of North London; 25% had not told the police, and of those that called the police, 30% had been attacked more than 30 times; a female sergeant of the police domestic violence unit at Cheshunt; at the time, the police would not investigate all cases, unless there was obvious evidence; sometimes neighbours called the police; assistant chief constable Maria Wallis, later chief constable from 2002 to 2006 of Devon and Cornwall Police; Detective Chief Inspector Max McLean; half of all women murdered in the UK were originally domestic violence cases, one hundred; court orders were possible in the Family Law Act 1996, to give a civil injunction, which could help prosecutions; the police showed shocking insufficient interest in breaches of these civil injunction, and the women have to move to new areas as the only solution; Elizabeth Woodcraft. Reported by Deborah Davies, produced by Terry Kelleher, directed by Lynn Ferguson, made by First Frame
- 23 April Men Behaving Badly Part 2, where Dispatches traced the abusive partners, to parade these individuals on national television; many women had been strangled; Sue and Mike Philips, who was possessive, and after breaking into her house, was caught by the police, and was arrested; after being released from the police station, he made threatening phone calls, and Sue refused to prosecute, a common occurrence in this situation; Mike Philips held Sue hostage in her home in Blackpool, and armed police attended the scene; police were given permission to shoot Mike Philips; Mike Philips was taken to prison, and made intimidating phone calls from prison, and Sue did not give evidence; Mike pleaded guilty to assault and affray, with two and a half years; after nine months, Mike Philips was released in summer 1997; Amy moved from her home, but her boyfriend found her in two months; her abusive partner broke in to her new house, with an iron bar, hit her, and she escaped by jumping from a third floor window; the CPS had allowed her abusive partner to plead guilty to actual bodily harm, and theft, not attempted murder, without Amy's knowledge; this is known as a plea bargain; serious violent assaults (GBH), and women being strangled, were changed by the CPS to common assault, which did not receive a custodial sentence; the CPS did not have proof of attempted murder; most females murdered by their partners were strangled; Gail married Mike Philips in Wales in 1981, and was physically abused for five years, having four children; Mike Philips had physically attacked three other women, and had criminal records over twenty years for assaulting the police, and sexual offences; for domestic violence cases, only 20% result in an arrest, with 3% being convicted, a similar conviction rate for rape; not all domestic violence is reported to the police
- 30 April, about child rape and sexual abuse in South Africa
- 4 June The Accident, about the death of Diana; Bob Loftus, head of Harrods security from 1987 to 1996, who said that Al-Fayed was paranoid; Al-Fayed sponsored the English National Ballet; Henry Porter, London Editor of Vanity Fair, who warned Diana about Al-Fayed's background; Al-Fayed bought the £20m Jonikal boat; Kelly Fisher (model); Diana boarded the 'Jonikal' on 21 August 1997, and on 30 August 1997, Diana boarded the private jet of Al-Fayed for France; Sami Nair, French civil servant who worked with Jean-Pierre Chevènement, the Minister of the Interior (France); Kirsty Lang, French correspondent of the Sunday Times, now a BBC Radio 4 presenter; the French investigation was headed by Pierre Ottavioli, who was in charge of the Brigade criminelle, the equivalent of the British CID, and was legally advised by Georges Kiejman, a former government junior minister; the London investigation was headed by former detective John McNamara; Tom Sancton, of Time (magazine), who wrote 'Death of a Princess'; Brian Dodd, former head of security for Al-Fayed; Henri Paul was not permitted to drive a limousine car, as described by Roland Biribin, of the French Association of Limousine Companies; 28 year old hotel security employee Frederic Lucard, brought the Mercedes 280 to the back of the hotel. Reported by Martyn Gregory, produced by Simon Berthon, directed by Celia Lowenstein, made by 3BM Television
- 29 October Cooke, about the murderer Sidney Cooke, and why he should never have been let out of prison, who had been sentenced to 19 years in May 1989, presented by David Jessel. It led to Cooke being rearrested, and faced trial in October 1999, where he pleaded guilty
- 12 November Teenage Gang Rape, a documentary about teenage gang rape, finds that most cases of gang rape in UK are committed by black youths; some perpetrators were aged no more than 11. Of 14 cases of juvenile gang rape from 1996, nine were by all-black gangs, and all but one of rest, was by mixed groups. 80% of the 79 youths charged with rape or indecent assault in the 14 cases were black. In a case in Birmingham, it was led by 12 year olds. Most of the victims were black girls. Half of the 14 cases were in south London. Reported by Deborah Davies, made by Laurel Productions. On 19 November 1998, there was a protest outside the headquarters of Channel 4 by the National Assembly Against Racism. Tony Sewell disputed the programme
- 26 November The Hidden Killer
- 10 December Inside the ALF, about the Animal Liberation Front; Dispatches went undercover for seven months with Graham Hall; Barry Horne (activist) goes on hunger strike in November 1998, who had been sent to prison for 18 years in 1997; Prof Paul Wilkinson of the Centre for the Study of Terrorism and Political Violence; protestors outside a site that bred cats for animal experiments; potty-mouthed animal rights campaigner Gayner Ford in Hampshire, who tells Graham how to pour paint stripper over cars at the Wickham Laboratories Ltd; disrupting foxhunting in Corhampton; the ALF set fire to people's homes; Will Fowler of the Institute of Explosives Engineers; Mark Matfield of the Research Defence Society; Robin Webb outside Bristol Crown Court, and later discusses how to launder money to fund the Animal Rights Militia and Justice Department splinter groups; Prof Colin Blakemore, who had been sent a letter bomb; Cliff Paterson in Gloucestershire; Robin Webb astutely deduces that Graham Hall is recording him. Reported by Deborah Davies, produced by Steve Boulton, directed by David Monaghan. It won the 1998 BAFTA TV Award for Best News Coverage
- 17 December The Lockerbie Trail, about flaws in evidence of Lockerbie, which occurred ten years earlier

=== 1999 ===
- 28 January Kicking the Habit, about excessive consumption of salt and salt and cardiovascular disease; Prof Graham McGregor of St George's Hospital; a tin of soup had 3g of salt, a slice of bread had 0.5g of salt, with Marmite this adds another 0.5g of salt; a Big Mac and Fries had 2.5g of salt; Lizzie Vann, an organic food producer; Nigel Dickie; Dr Michael Baxendine of the Food and Drink Federation; cardiologist Prof John Douglas Swales of the University of Leicester, who researched hypertension (high blood pressure) and disputed a link to salt consumption; Wendy Wrigley of the Co-op. Reported by Christopher Hird, produced by Tracey Gardiner, directed by Emma Handley, made by Fulcrum TV
- 4 February Ireland, about the Omagh bombing; Dorothy Robinson, who believed that the British Army in Northern Ireland was a 'legitimate target', who raised money at a dinner in the US for the IRA at Rory Dolan's Restaurant Bar on Saturday 1 February 1999, giving $20,000 for the Continuity IRA; Irish Police regularly searched properties in County Louth; former terrorists Sean O'Callaghan, who served eight years, and Brendan McClenaghan, who served 18 years, and now lived in London; terrorist Paddy Fox, sentenced to 12 years, was physically beaten on Sunday 2 February 1999 in Monaghan by the IRA for renouncing the peace agreement; the Continuity IRA also renounced the agreement, setting off a bomb in Market Hill in August 1997, supported by Republican Sinn Féin in the Republic, led by Ruairí Ó Brádaigh, a former head of the former IRA, who broke away from Sinn Féin in 1986; Prof Paul Rogers, who researched terrorism; Micky Donnelly, of Republican Sinn Féin, was also attacked by the IRA; the Real IRA, largely from County Louth, called a ceasefire, after being threatened by the IRA, who then kidnapped one of the 32 County Sovereignty Movement; Rory Dougan; County Monaghan had known sympathies for the Republican movement, holding meetings; unionist Ken Maginnis. Reported by Joe Layburn, produced by Steve Haywood, directed by Alison Turner, made by Just Television
- 25 February Surveyors; a mortgage survey is mostly there to assess the financial worth of a property, not the structural integrity; Britain had 80,000 qualified chartered surveyors, governed by the RICS; it introduced the RICS HomeBuyer Report in 1981; Geoff Holden of the RICS; test surveying house inspections were covertly filmed; a typical house inspection was thought to last three to four hours, but some of the test inspections took the covertly filmed surveyors one hour. Reported by Callum Macrae, produced by Steve Haywood, directed by Tim Pritchard, made by Just Television
- 18 March The Crime Game, about British police vastly incorrectly reporting burglary; Peter Coles, a former detective superintendent with Nottinghamshire Police at Hucknall CID; Richard Wells, former Chief Constable from 1990 to 1998 of South Yorkshire Police; Trish Prescott from Nottingham; crimes were downgraded by police, known as 'cuffing'; petty criminals were taken out of prison to confess to crimes that they had not known, known to police as 'to write off', again to lessen recorded crime; Nottinghamshire Police tried this strategy; Gary Mason, editor of Police Review; Bedfordshire Police investigated Nottinghamshire Police; Colin Bailey, Chief Constable of Nottinghamshire Police from 1995 to 2000, who admitted that in 1996 Bedfordshire Police had found much false reporting; Nottinghamshire claimed to have solved 98.3% of rapes, which Bedfordshire Police could not believe; Peter Coles alleged that 50% of Nottinghamshire's burglaries were fictitious, or wrongly recorded; David McCrone, assistant Chief Constable of Greater Manchester Police; in 1999 South Yorkshire Police, Dorset Police, Hertfordshire Constabulary, Staffordshire Police and Gloucestershire Constabulary 'wrote off' two-thirds of its burglaries by fictitious confessions; Leicestershire Police, Sussex Police, Lincolnshire Police and South Wales Police followed close. Reported by Nick Davies. produced by Steve Boulton, directed by Mike Turnbull
- 25 March CCTV, about the veracity of CCTV evidence in court; Prof Graham Davies of the University of Leicester; there were a million CCTV cameras in the UK; Bob Lack of the London Borough of Newham, which had a facial recognition that would warn the CCTV operator when a face was found on its database; the system had reduced unsolved crime by 35% and street theft by 70%; Richard Thomas of ACPO; Cambridge-educated Prof Vicki Bruce of the Psychology department of the University of Stirling, and research on facial recognition and CCTV; Alan Church, who was convicted of raiding a building society of £1,000 in central Glasgow on 28 January 1993, on CCTV evidence; he was sent to prison for eight years; the CCTV footage was shown on STV Scotland Today on 10 February 1993; his family saw the CCTV and told Alan to go to the police, where three people picked him out in an identity parade; Alf Linney of UCL; a McDonalds is raided on 10 October 1996 at 2pm in Ashton-under-Lyne, taking £9,500; it went to court on 16 June 1997; Margaret Bowden, mother of Brian Bowden, who was convicted of the offence on CCTV; sculptor Richard Neave of the University of Manchester; Geoffrey Oxlee. Reported by Joe Layburn, produced by Rob Edwards, directed by Ed Braman, made by Lomond Productions
- 15 April, Child Contact; 150,000 children a year are part of their parents divorcing, with a third of these divorces due to the male partner being violent, with many of the women deciding not to see their former partner again, but family courts regularly allow the violent former partner to have access to the children; Lorraine Radford of the Roehampton Institute; Sir Nicholas Wall; court welfare officers visit families, to decide what happens; on Sunday 6 February 1994, 35 year old GP, formerly of North Wingfield Medical Centre, Sukhdev Sandhu, on a contact visit, strangled his four-year-old daughter and three-year-old son, with a pyjama cord, then jumped from a tower block (Kelvin Flats) to his death; the couple had met at Queen Mary's Hospital, Roehampton, and had been married for four years from October 1988 living at Tibshelf Road in Holmewood in north Derbyshire; the 30 year old (nursing sister) mother had been through the courts to stop her former partner seeing the children. Narrated by Jenny Cuffe, directed by Leon Ferguson, made by First Frame
- 22 April Car Challenge, about choices in public transport; the Gallacher family have two cars; Jane, aged 43, drives the Metro to work at an infants school, and goes to keep fit; Mark drives a Ford Mondeo to take James, aged 11, to his grandmother; Mark, aged 46, works as headteacher of Birchills CE Primary School in Walsall; he was branch secretary of MENSA; Henry, aged 13, walks to the school bus; the car is needed for piano lessons for Henry, rugby matches, and going out for meals; the reporter travels to the family house from Euston railway station by cycle; including all costs, having the two cars costs the family £108 per week; Channel 4 gave the family £108 and physically took away the two cars; the Labour government wanted to tax work parking spaces, perhaps £20 per week; a third of British children are driven to school; Jane's drive to the infant school would take 25 mins, but now she has to catch a bus into Walsall, and another to the outskirts, taking around an hour; Mark needed one bus, and finds the journey faster than the car, and comfortable; his wife much prefers the comfort of her car; the boys visit their grandparents every week; the bus did not turn up for a game of football for Mark, so he is forced to spend £17.50 on a taxi; after 6pm, the bus service was often negligible; the two boys had to play rugby in Tamworth, Staffordshire and Kingswinford, and it was impossible to get them both there; housing estates tend to be designed for people with a car, less so for public transport; councillor Richard Worrall, of the WM Passenger Transport Authority; the Labour government wanted road tolling, so that councils could charge drivers to enter city centres, and maybe tolling on motorways; the Wallis family - Stephen and his wife Sara, a teacher's assistant, with Charlotte aged 16 and Christopher aged 13; Stephen drives his Mercedes company car, along the M42, to work, where he was head of the accounts department at Zytek Automotive in Bassetts Pole; one in ten British motorists had a company car; the Gallacher family go to the supermarket via the taxi, costing £5.50; on Saturday the family catch the bus to the city centre, then catch the train to Birmingham, then another train to the Severn Valley heritage line at Kidderminster; the journey has taken two and a half hours, which would take 40 minutes by car; in the 1950s most families kept travelling to a minimum. Reported by Christopher Hird, produced by Tracey Gardiner, directed by Donna Clark, made by Fulcrum TV
- 6 May Bosses in the Dock, about the safety record of Tarmac, in Wolverhampton
- 13 May Car Trouble: Insurance, about deviant British car insurers; 49 year old Jim Halford, a bus driver in Gravesend, injured by a drinker driver in 1998, banned for 21 months; Zurich Insurance declined to be liable; vehicle insurance companies had a series of tactics - giving a low initial offer, an eleventh hour offer, or a series of medical examinations; Tony Baker of the Association of British Insurers; Nick Burgum, of Kent, had a shattered knee; General Accident, part of CGU, accepted liability, but disputed the injuries; General Accident meanwhile had been covertly filming his house, but paid the claim in full; Dame Hazel Genn of UCL; the A259 near Hooe, East Sussex, which had a horrific crash in June 1994; eyewitness Peter Gates; Barry Clark of Sussex Police; Alex, of East Sussex, was severely burned, needing amputations of her legs, and part of her left arm; her 64 year old husband John, a vicar, was killed; a driver, off-duty policeman 26 year old Michael Dean of Swanley, was sent to prison for four years in November 1995; his vehicle was overtaking many cars at around 90 mph on a 60 mph single carriageway; at court, he claimed that all the 14 witnesses were making things up; Alex won £1.5m in damages in April 1998; Walter Merricks, the UK Insurance Ombudsman. Reported by Joe Layburn, produced by Ray FitzWalter, directed by David Barrie
- 27 May Car Trouble: Breakdown; the British insurance industry believed that car recovery companies were charging twice as much as required; eight garages in Kent are contacted for a vehicle tow-away quote; the insurance industry believed that a tow-away should cost no more than £105, but on average it was £210; Mora Campbell was hit by a vehicle on the M6 in Cheshire in April 1998, driving home from Manchester; she called the AA, who said that it could take longer than an hour, which was not sufficient for the police, who wanted her vehicle removed in twenty minutes; she had to pay £152 up front; the headquarters of Lincolnshire Police in Nettleham, who had a list of twenty seven garages, who operated on a rota; Inspector Greville Burgess; Inspector John Bennett of ACPO; Bill Tupman; Gwent Police had thirty five garages on their rota list, but changed this to just one recovery company; Liz Phillips of Wales, who had her car damaged by that same recovery company, which her insurance company would not pay for; 25 year old Tony Killor was killed on his motorbike on 4 September 1995; the destroyed bike was recovered by the company; the bike was sold by the company. Reported by Joe Layburn, produced by Steve Haywood, directed by Mark Lewis, made by Just Television (the production team of Rough Justice)
- 11 November A matter of life or death, about train safety in the UK, notably evacuation in a fire: a Mk 2 carriage is rested on one side; survivor Chris Bartlett; professor of fire safety engineering, Australian Ed Galea of the University of Greenwich; Steve Bence of ATOC; Graham Stepan and fire safety; the Hope Valley Line near Manchester; signal Y304 on the Trans Pennine Express route; a GNER service on the East Coast Main Line; Jose Fernandez of Long Island Rail Road; Lee Williams of Amtrak; survivor David Taylor. Presented by Christopher Hird, directed by Peter Minns, made by Fulcrum Productions
- November Runaways, a survey found that 100,000 children would run away in one year; Graeme Brown of The Children's Society; Rob Hutchinson of the Association of Directors of Social Services; 13 year old Aliyah Ismail was found dead on 18 October 1998, in a derelict house at 78 Agar Grove in Camden, after a methadone overdose, having run away sixty one times in her last year; the Children's Society had two refuges. Reported by Joe Layburn, directed by Lynn Ferguson, made by First Frame
- 2 December Tooth Trouble about unwanted effects of possibly unneeded dentistry for teenagers; every a half million British children had orthodontic treatment, largely to straighten teeth; dentist John Mew, who lived in Sussex; Ben Creed and his twin brother; South African dentist Francois Rossouw of Essex; dentist Michael Fennel; Nigel Harradine of the British Orthodontic Society, and the University of Bristol Dental Hospital; Californian dentist William Hang. Reported by Callum Macrae. produced by David Alford, directed by Howard Bradburn, made by 3BM Television
- 9 December Licensed to Kill, about arms trading. An EDM was tabled by Jenny Tonge, and it was discussed in parliament on 1 November 2000 by Labour MP Frank Cook.

=== 2000 ===
- 17 February Drug Wars, about customs officers and drug; in 1999 24 tonnes of cocaine, 4 tonnes of heroin, and 400 tonnes of cannabis were thought to have entered the UK illegally; a drugs conference was held in February 2000; Operation Teak took place in May 1997 off the coast of Funchal, where 4 tonnes of cannabis was found, worth £14m; Brian Charrington, living in Spain, had supplied the drugs; Derek Todd, formerly of the Metropolitan Police; Operation Funded took place in 1998, culminating with cannabis being seized at a service station by customs officers on the M25 motorway; Operation Stealer took place, by Customs and Excise National Investigation Service from 1993 to 1994, where Brian Doran from Glasgow, known as 'The Professor', was watched at The Lanesborough in London, and culminating at Pevensey Bay in East Sussex on 10 January 1995, when the catamaran 'Frugal' arrived with £34m of cocaine from Colombia; convictions collapsed because the legal procedures of surveillance was not followed. Reported by David Jessel, produced by Steve Haywood and Sam Bagnall, directed by Peter Minns, made by Just Television
- 24 February Tax Wars, about Value-added tax in the United Kingdom; Justin Urquhart Stewart of Barclays Stockbrokers; John and Kathy Oldfield were taken to a VAT tribunal; most food does not have VAT added; HM Custom and Excise was headquartered at New King's Beam House; VAT consultant Ray Chappell believed that VAT inspectors were overzealous; Marion Lonsdale; Labour MP Jim Cousins of the Treasury Select Committee, who investigated methods of how VAT was collected, and recommended that Customs and Excise was amalgamated with the Inland Revenue; Rev Gerald Pegg of St Nicholas in Icklesham in East Sussex. The programme was made in conjunction with the Federation of Small Businesses. Reported by David Jessel, produced by Steve Haywood and Sam Bagnall, made by Just Television
- 2 March Gayhurst Crescent goes surfing; Sunderland had the lowest level of internet access in England; homes on a street are given £1,500 of computing equipment; Paul Fenech liked football; Steve Pinder found it slow; Ned Potts; Julie McQuillian had Crohn's disease, and found much information; Joyce Charlton, aged 66, found information on a former friend who was killed a week after D-Day, with the Durham Light Infantry, aged 18; Ken Clasper liked information on World War II; Tom Hawick found much information on tinnitus; Linda Fenech wanted a vacuum cleaner, and ordered one; Iceland was the only supermarket that delivered in their area; John Old; Leno Fenech said that the internet added to family life; Mick Thwaites finds an old friend; Hayley Charlton looked at the Employment Service website, which required much improvement. Reported by Christopher Hird, produced by Dominic Yeatman, directed by Don Coutts, made by Fulcrum TV
- 16 March Still getting away with rape, a one-hour special; in 1999 around 7,000 women in England and Wales reported rape; for every hundred rapes, six men are convicted; Prof Jennifer Temkin of the University of Sussex; Dame Anne Rafferty; Helen Grindrod; forensic psychiatrist Gillian Mezey; Sandy Hebblethwaite of the CPS; Ann Mallalieu, Baroness Mallalieu and how prosecution counsel are often inexperienced, as the prosecution in these cases is not well paid; the US had greater witness preparation; for acquaintance rape in the US, conviction rates are 60-70%, in the UK it is around 30%; Detective Chief Inspector Sue Hill of the Metropolitan Police, and how few cases of rape were probably made up; the British law system was naïve - rapists are not characters widely known for any honesty, whatsoever. Reported by Deborah Davies, produced by Lynn Ferguson, directed by Howard Bradburn, made by First Frame
- 13 April The Nuclear Files, about nuclear industry safety in the UK; the Sellafield Visitors Centre; a train leaving Dungeness nuclear power station; nuclear engineer John Large; the train took 350 miles to reach Sellafield; Mildred Fox and possible radioactivity reaching the coast of County Wicklow; Tom Burke (environmentalist); former Sellafield worker Duncan Ball; Welsh Labour MP Llew Smith, and whether any plutonium was exported to the US; Prof Keith Barnham of Imperial College; the melodramatic ponderous tone of the documentary was reminiscent of the 1985 Edge of Darkness. Reported by Joe Layburn, produced by Geoff Atkinson. directed by Mark Lewis, made by Vera Productions.
- 27 April Sally Clark, about Sally Clark
- 12 October Flying under the influence, about intoxicated British airline pilots, an hour long episode; former air stewardess Caroline Woolistone, went undercover by claiming to be a Channel 4 producer to investigate, and set up, BA pilots; at Marseille airport, having flown with BA from Gatwick Airport; on the flight she was allowed to film in the cockpit, in Spain, a popular stay with BA aircrew, where BA had five scheduled flights a day on weekdays; Capt Chris Salmon, of BA, seen in Manchester in August 2000; he flew to Spain on BA 2488 on 25 July 2000 (which would also be a catastrophic day for British aviation) where he is filmed drinking; First Officer James Sharples downed a bottle of wine and three beers, as has Capt Chris Salmon, who has another beer and goes clubbing in Spain, drinking another three beers; no pilots are breathalysed, and there were no alcohol laws for pilots either; Dr Dougal Watson of Australia and aviation medicine, who saw the video evidence and thought that pilot Chris Salmon would fall asleep in the flight, which is exactly what occurred on flight BA 2485 to Gatwick on 26 July 2000; Prof Chris Cook of the University of Kent and alcohol misuse in aviation medicine; BA did not allow drinking eight hours before a flight, and no more than 5 units; flying to Germany from Gatwick, with Capt Mike Philips and First Officer Jason Owen, again filming them in the cockpit; seven hours before takeoff the First Officer has consumed twelve units, as had the Captain; they stay at the Holiday Inn, going to bed at 4am; they leave for the airport at 10am; BA 2715 leaves at 11am on 2 July 2000, where Caroline films in the cockpit as they land at Gatwick; three US airline pilots, aged around 30, conduct an experiment at the Purdue University in Indiana, on a Boeing 727 simulator; Dr Leon Wise found alcohol had effects for 14 hours; the experiment found that flying itself was not impaired, but incorrect choices were made; over Britain in daylight hours, there are approximately 250 passenger aircraft in the air; Gary Purden, former BA aircrew; First Officer Mike Edwards in Spain at 5.30pm; he leaves the restaurant having drunk 12 units; the flight leaves at 6am; he has consumed 19 units by 11pm; Malév Hungarian Airlines, the state flyer of Hungary, had 25 aircraft; Malév had the same rules as BA, but Hungary routinely breathalysed aircrew and ground staff; Dr Gabor Hardicsay of the Civil Aviation Authority (Hungary); the US randomly tested pilots; mainline and underground British train drivers were checked; London Underground had breathalysed around 4,000 drivers in one year; David Hyde, Director of Safety at BA; BA pilot 44-year-old Nigel King was sacked in February 1998 after being found drunk in his hotel two hours before his flight at 7am; on flight BA 631 from Athens to Heathrow, he was found to be smelling strongly of alcohol, and unsteady on his feet, subsequently collapsing in a hotel lobby; he had gone out for the evening at 6pm on 8 January 1998, returning to his hotel room at 5am; a Virgin Express pilot resigned on Sunday August 29, 1999 after passengers thought that he was drunk on flight TV 857 from Madrid–Barajas Airport to Brussels, with the flight being abandoned; the passengers had overheard the Virgin Express staff mentioning that they had had trouble trying to wake the pilot in his hotel, as he was so drunk; passengers had sensed that the pilot was drunk, as he walked past them, being many minutes late, at 8.30am on Saturday 28 August, with a 'strange appearance'; Paul Skellon, a representative of Virgin Express helpfully explained that the pilot had had food poisoning, and that 'medication' that he had taken had made him unwell.; two easyJet pilots were disciplined in 2000; BA would suspend the eleven aircrew featured in the documentary, including Capt Richard Agar and First Officer Guy Palling, who flew a Boeing 737 from Marseilles to Gatwick on March 25 on BA 2361, and Capt Anthony Corr and First Officers Gareth Edwards and Richard Firth; two of the featured BA pilots would be dismissed in December 2000 for gross misconduct, and another resigned. BA employed around 3,500 flight crew and around 14,000 cabin crew, and carried 33 million people a year. Narrated by Haydn Gwynne, produced by Nick Aarons, directed by Howard Bradbury, made by United Productions.
- 2 November Bras: The Bare Facts; in 1999 in the UK, women bought 75m bras, with a £600m industry; a Pretty Polly advert featuring Holly Willoughby; Sydney Singer, author of 'Dressed to Kill'; Simon Cawthorn, surgeon at Frenchay Hospital; Prof Robert Mansel, of the University Hospital of Wales; breast pain; bra-fitters were trained at the head office of Playtex; Prof Jean-Christophe Thalabard at the Necker Hospital; Prof Hugh Simpson of Glasgow Royal Infirmary. Narrated by Marilyn Milgrom, produced by Martin Weitz, directed by Jill Nicholls, made by Mentorn Barraclough Carey and Focus Productions
- 16 November The Runaway Cars, about cruise control on the Ford Explorer 4x4 causing crashes
- 23 November How to Jump the Health Queue

=== 2001 ===
- 12 June Unforgiven: The Boys who Murdered James Bulger, reported by Deborah Davies
- 26 June Beneath the Veil, about Afghanistan; reporter Saira Shah reported undercover. Made by Hardcash Productions. Won the 2002 BAFTA TV Award for Best Current Affairs

=== 2002 ===
- 9 June How to break into Britain; around 1,000 illegal immigrants entered Britain every week, in 2002; at Calais was Dmitru from Romania, who had lived in the UK before, and had a London Underground travel pass; Dmitru had been deported two years earlier, having been caught thieving; Dmitru said 'they give houses to anyone' - 'after you turn yourself in, they give you a house'; on his next planned illegal entrance into the UK, he said 'this time, I'll get a woman and two kids with me, and I'll turn myself in as a family', to ensure that he would escape deportation; Dmitru knew a truck driver, Ian, who smuggled illegal immigrants, and he is quoted a price of £1000; P&O Ferries checked trucks for levels of carbon dioxide; a German truck driver, who stopped in Brussels, is found, by a P&O security team, to have two illegal immigrants; already in 2002, 3,260 illegal immigrants were caught on trucks, by security checks, before the journey to the UK; John Morrison, of the UNHCR policy research unit; newly built cars, to be imported through the tunnel to the UK, were often entered by illegal immigrants, to cross to the UK, as French security did not check these cars, and many were not locked; Dmitru is introduced to Vlad, from Moldova, who would gain entrance into a steel container, for the tunnel, and reseal the steel container; the Dollands Moor Freight Yard in Kent, the first checkpoint on arrival in the UK; illegal immigrants at the freight yard were greeted by the British Transport Police, who ask questions, and take pictures of the immigrants for their 'rogues gallery'; in that month, in 2002, 460 illegal immigrants had been picked up at the freight yard, and many other illegal immigrants may have not been caught by police; Bob Gee, of the British Transport Police, describes that, on being caught by the police, many illegal immigrants 'clapped and cheered' because the illegal immigrants had 'got over the final hurdle, to the Land of Milk and Honey'; the freight train from Milan, was referred to by the Kent security team as the 'Afghan Express'; none of the illegal immigrants had any documentation or passports; Dmitru had made it to London, and was travelling to Manchester, to stay with Romanian friends; Dmitru was being asked to steal property, when working as a cleaner on commercial sites, which he did not want to do; in Manchester, Dmitru applies for asylum, giving a story that he had to jump out of a truck, and was separated from 'his family'; Dmitru had been told by a council department that if he found 'his family', that he would be given a whole house, so he found someone to 'borrow' their wife and children, to appear to a local council department; Dmitru did not give his real name to the council department, and never provided any official documents. Produced by Steve Boulton, directed by Tom Anstiss, made by RDF Television. Discussed in parliament on 12 June 2002 by Labour MP Mike Gapes.
- 17 November Truth and Lies in Baghdad, featured an investigation of executions by the Fedayeen Saddam, discussed in the House of Lords on 28 November 2002, on the topic of United Nations Security Council Resolution 1441, by Labour Meta Ramsay, Baroness Ramsay of Cartvale

=== 2003 ===
- April Al-Qaeda UK, about Al-Qaeda connections to the UK, notably in Leicester; Algerian terrorist Kamel Daoudi left France, for the UK, on 20 September 2002 at around 8pm, being watched the whole way by security services, he travelled under a false name, on a counterfeit French passport by Eurostar; from London, he travelled to Leicester, a place he knew well, where he had two Algerian friends Baghdad Meziane and Brahim Benmerzouga of 52 Prospect Hill, who had travelled to the UK illegally with a false passport, two weeks previous to the programme, these two terrorists became the first people in the UK to be convicted of having known connections to Al Qaeda; Benmerzouga was followed around Leicester by the security services, where he mostly sent money, internationally, from outlets similar to Western Union; Baghdad Meziane lived on nearby Rolleston Street; five days after Kamel Daoudi arrived in Leicester, Leicestershire Police gained entry into both houses, where a false passport operation was found in Meziane's address, selling each for £750; Nick Webber was asked by Leicestershire Police to examine computers in the Islamic terrorist address, where he found software for credit card fraud, and the data from the magnetic strips of 180 credit cards; the data of the credit cards had been skimmed from garages and restaurants across the UK; the fake credit cards were sent to a group of Algerians in Spain, spending around £250,000, who were caught in Spain, the day after the Leicester arrests; the two Algerians went to court in Leicester, but the jury were not told that the group in Spain were part of an Algerian terrorist group; terrorist propaganda videos were found by Leicestershire Police in the car of Benmerzouga; Detective Superintendent Martin Morrisey of Leicestershire Police; Alexis Debat said that MI5 had been heavily investigating Leicester from around 1998; part of the Al Qaeda group in Leicester was Djamel Beghal, who moved to Leicester in 1997, where his wife still lives; neighbour Nisha Lakha; the group vanished in July 2000, when Beghal moved to Afghanistan to plan a suicide attack; Beghal was arrested travelling back to Europe on 28 July 2001 at Dubai International Airport, where he admitted being told to attack the US embassy in France, the so-called 2001 bomb plot in Europe, with a suicide truck bomb, to be driven by Nizar Trabelsi; Baghdad Meziane was originally working in Düsseldorf, under a different name; Jordanian Abu Qatada al-Filistini conducted 'study sessions' at the Fourth Feathers youth community centre on Rossmore Road in Marylebone; it became a European conversion centre for Al Qaeda; terrorist Zacarias Moussaoui attended this centre; Abu Qatada was arrested by British police in October 2002; Algerians comprised the largest Al Qaeda group in Europe; the Salafist Group for Preaching and Combat, or GSPC; Mohamed Sifaoui infiltrated the GSPC, who became trusted by Algerian Karim Bourti, who was convicted for three years for the 1998 World Cup terror plot; convicted terrorist Karim Bourti travels on the Eurostar with Mohamed Sifaoui, to go to Finsbury Park, and encounters no difficulty at security, meeting terrorist Omar Saiki, who was convicted for four years in France, for the 1998 bomb plot, and stripped of French citizenship. Reported by Deborah Davies, produced by Eamonn Matthews, directed by Rachel Rendall, made by Mentorn Midlands

=== 2004 ===
- 29 April Third Class Post, about Royal Mail, it alleged that organised crime gangs had infiltrated Royal Mail. Discussed in parliament on 12 May 2004 by Lib Dem MP Brian Cotter, Baron Cotter and Conservative MPs Mark Field and Michael Fabricant, who mentioned that irregularities in the Soviet Union postal system were always to be expected.
- May 2004 Fit to Eat, about hospital food, the NHS produced 300 million meals a year, costing £500m, with 30% of these meals produced in the factories of private companies, the documentary examined the hygiene of cook-chill meals
- 25 November Profiting from Kids in Care, discussed in the House of Lords on 6 December 2004 by Francis Hare, 6th Earl of Listowel and in January 2005

=== 2005 ===
- 31 January Undercover Angels
- 7 July Undercover Teacher, about poor conduct in comprehensive schools; BBC Look East weather presenter Alex Dolan went undercover as a supply science teacher.
- 18 July Pain of Death
- 21 July Beslan, about the Beslan school siege in September 2004. Won the 2006 BAFTA TV Award for Best Current Affairs
- 8 August Why Bomb London?; on 3 January 1996 Lunar House writes a letter to Osama Bin Laden to inform him that he is excluded from the UK; in the mid-1990s, Osama Bin Laden had training camps in Sudan, but Britain had allowed religious radicals from countries such as Egypt and Saudi Arabia to enter in the 1990s; these included Khalid al-Fawwaz in Willesden Green of the Advice and Reformation Committee (ARC), Abu Doha in Dollis Hill, Omar Bakri, from Syria, in Tottenham, and Abu Qatada, from Jordan, in Acton; Alexis Debat of the French government; Sa'ad Al-Faqih of the Movement for Islamic Reform in Arabia and how Britain was tolerant to these radical individuals, maybe too tolerant; Pauline Neville-Jones, Baroness Neville-Jones, at the Foreign Office from 1994 to 1996, and how Middle Eastern governments had made complaints about these individuals; the 1995 France bombings; Jean-Louis Bruguière, and how the radicals involved moved to Britain, as it was a pleasant country in which to live; the 1998 United States embassy bombings in Kenya had planning in Britain; Dominique Thomas wrote the book 'Londonistan'; the jihadist Abu Doha arrives in Britain in 1999, to recruit followers, to take part in the 2000 millennium attack plots at Los Angeles Airport, where the attacker was caught with a car full of explosives, receiving 22 years in July 2005; German Dirk Laabs and the attempted Strasbourg Cathedral bombing plot in December 2000; three of the attackers had been trained at London mosques; the attackers had had their mobile phones intercepted; the radical jihadist Abu Qatada arrived in 1993, and recruited in London; British intelligence agencies knew that he was dangerous, but had lived in London for eight years (he was featured on Dispatches in 2003); the main participants of the September 2001 attack telephoned Abu Qatada weeks before, and watched his extremist videos; Abu Izzadeen (Trevor Brooks) of Al Ghurabaa; Muhammad Sulaiman, of Luton Central Mosque in Bury Park; Finsbury Park Mosque was home of the Supporters of Shariah; Sajjad H. Rizvi of the University of Exeter; Iftekhar Bokhari of the Hussainia Mosque in Burnley, and the 2001 Oldham riots; Oussama Kassir and terrorist Haroon Rashid Aswat, deported from Zambia and arrested in Britain; Neil Doyle; Andrew White (priest); Mohammed Naseem of Birmingham Central Mosque; Shaista Gohir, Baroness Gohir, of Muslim Voice UK, at the Living Islam festival; Sir Iqbal Sacranie of the Muslim Council of Britain. Reported by Deborah Davies, produced by Ed Braman, directed by Tom Porter, made by Mentorn
- 8 September Dyslexia Myth, with the educational psychologist from Durham University, Julian Elliott, the documentary claimed that a diagnosis was sometimes given to hide embarrassment of being a naturally slow reader, and nothing more; a test from the Dyslexia Institute takes two hours and costs £350; dyslexia was invented in the 1900s; Durham Cathedral; an education conference at Durham University; Prof Frank Vellutino, of New York State University, who questioned dyslexia in the 1970s; a common treatment for dyslexia was tinted glasses, and plastic overlays; psychologist Prof Dorothy V. M. Bishop; Wynford Dore set up Dore Achievement Centres; Prof Keith Stanovich from the University of Toronto; Prof Maggie Snowling from the University of York; Prof Richard Olsen conducted a twin experiment at the University of Colorado, that found that reading difficulties was caused 50% by genes; the Texas Medical Center; Japanese people cannot pronounce r-words; some children are much more prepared for primary school, than others; it was similar to the Matthew effect, in the consequences; Peter and Janet Hatcher, from Cumbria; Peter Tymms, of the University of Durham; much time went into the diagnosis of dyslexia. Produced by David Mills, made by Mills Productions
- 30 September Mad About Animals, about peculiar animal rights methods of intimidation; vegan Jonny Ablewhite (born 27 January 1970), who grew up in Aldridge studying English and History at the University of Leicester, and Kerry Whitburn, of Edgbaston; both had gone to prison; through intimidation, a research lab in Cambridge was stopped; Mel Broughton; Staffordshire Police followed the unhinged protesters' vehicles; Gail Record shouts "does your wife have Botox?" to unknown company employees; the protesters do not enjoy being answered back; construction workers call the protesters 'parasites'; Jon Ablewhite was a supply teacher in Wolverhampton; Keith Mann from Rochdale, with girlfriend Paula, was sentenced to 14 years in 1994; Devon and Cornwall Police arrest the film-maker, on suspicion of causing criminal damage, being held by police for 18 hours; two weeks later, Jon Ablewhite is arrested, where he remained in prison at the time of broadcast in September 2005; he pleaded guilty to conspiracy to blackmail; the judge, Michael Pert, described the three defendants as 'cold-blooded', and gave each a twelve-year custodial sentence at Nottingham Crown Court in September 2005, and would be inside for six years. Kerry Whitburn, of Yardley Wood, had been convicted of arson, when aged 18 in 1987. Reported by David Modell, produced by Chris Bryer
- 19 September Secrets of the Shoplifters; Reverend's Revenge by The Housemartins; there were 300,000 arrests a year for shoplifting; £2m was stolen each day, costing £3bn a year; Cindy was a brazen and veteran shoplifter; she steals a tea pot from the Coop; Red Alert by Basement Jaxx; the top ten stolen items were - 1.Razor blades, often the Gillette Mach3, the most stolen item in the UK, and 26% of all razor blades were stolen, 2.Alcohol, mostly spirits, 3.Clothing, notably sportswear, 4.Cosmetics and toiletries, notably Ulay and Lynx deodorant, 5.Batteries, known labels not supermarket makes, 6.DVDs, computer games, 7.Medicines, vitamins, 8.Electric toothbrush, 9.Instant coffee, known makes, 10. Meat; Martin Gill, professor of criminology at the University of Leicester, and that security cameras rarely stopped shoplifting; retail parks were highly popular with thieves, as the shops were so big; Cindy's boyfriend stole 700 bottles of Jack Daniels in two days; 90% of shoplifters were drug addicts; a thief is followed by Northamptonshire Police to Windsor Crescent in Northampton; fingerprints are checked at the Criminal Records Office (CRO); it costs £200m to prosecute thieves, and £125m to sentence thieves; all shoplifters are tested for Class A drugs, and around 90% of shoplifters test positive; the Met Police had a retail crime squad; there were around 400 violent offences against shop workers every day; Paul Fox of Gillette. Reported by Deborah Davies, produced by Howard Foster, directed by Nick Finnis, made by Chameleon TV

=== 2006 ===
- 13 February Ryanair: Caught Napping, produced by Steve Bolton. The chief executive Michael O'Leary responded with: 'If that's the best they can do after five months then they should give up filming. Channel 4 can shove this programme up its jacksie'; two Dispatches reporters, Charlotte Smith and Mary Nash, went under cover for five and a half months from July to November 2005; staff pay £1400 to be trained, pay £25 each month to wear the uniform; the company has a 25-minute turnaround; the last 737-200 left service in December 2005; on Wednesday 27 February 2002 an engine caught fire, and 117 passengers were evacuated at Stansted, on Flight 296 from Dublin; Chris Yates, security editor of Jane's Aviation; to become cabin staff, you have to have a clean police record, a five-year employment history, and a character reference; Simon Evans, of the Air Transport Users' Council; Andrew David Lobbenberg, of ABN AMRO. Narrated by Ian Curtis, directed by Karen Edwards
- 27 April Undercover Copper, about Leicestershire Police; police officer Nina Hobson receives an award from deputy chief constable David Lindley on 24 January 2006 at the Leicestershire headquarters in Enderby; Sir Matt Baggott, the chief constable, gives her the award, but 35 year old Nina was really an undercover reporter for Dispatches, having left the police five years before, being in the police from the age of 18, and joined the police again in April 2005, working as an undercover reporter for four months; Prof Liz Kelly of London Metropolitan University; less than 4% of reported rapes in Leicestershire were solved, and twelve other police forces had lower rates; Ian Kelcey of the Criminal Law Solicitors’ Association; Prof Marian FitzGerald of the University of Kent and noble cause corruption; Nina learns how police can operate subterfuge for reporting numbers of offences; the CPS now decided which offences would go to court, to reduce time for magistrates, but this now required much written preparation by the police; Sir Matt Baggott sincerely apologises. Narrated by Joe Duttine, produced by Alexander Gardiner, directed by Agnieszka Piotrowska and Andrew Mullins, made by Granada London.
- 4 September How Safe Is Heathrow?, amongst criminal gangs, Heathrow had the nickname 'Thief-row', until police took more interest in organised crime at the cargo operations of the airport

=== 2007 ===
- 15 January Undercover Mosque, about mosques in the UK. Made by Hardcash Productions. An EDM was tabled in parliament on 16 January 2007 by Roger Godsliff, who questioned why West Midlands Police and the CPS had tried to sue Channel 4 for libel, than investigate the Muslim mosques. Discussed in parliament on 17 April 2007 by Conservative MP Paul Goodman, Baron Goodman of Wycombe, and again on 25 June 2008. Discussed on 12 June 2007 in the House of Lords by Labour Baroness Ramsay of Cartvale, and again at length in April 2009. MPs in parliament questioned why West Midlands Police tried to accuse Channel 4 first, and instead none of the extremist preachers, who had been filmed on national television? West Midlands Police had gone through 56 hours of watching footage of the documentary, but the CPS had decided that there was not sufficient evidence that Channel 4 had done anything wrong, so West Midlands Police had put in significant time to prove Channel 4 guilty. Another EDM was tabled by Roger Godsliff on 15 May 2008.
- 5 March Greenwash, discussed in parliament on 6 March 2007 by the Labour MP Alan Simpson and on 12 March 2007 by Tony Blair and Conservative MP Edward Leigh
- 26 March Toff at the Top, Peter Hitchens believed that parliament had now become the private property of conformist social, cultural and moral liberals, and that those people who did not share the values of this elite were excluded from power or influence; Sebastian Grigg, 4th Baron Altrincham was in the Bullingdon Club with David Cameron; Robin Harris (author) was Director from 1985-88 of the Conservative Research Department, and believed that David Cameron was an opportunist, who had few inherent salient beliefs when at the CCO; David Cameron was in the 'Brat Pack', in the early 1990s, which evolved into the Notting Hill set, with George Bridges, Baron Bridges of Headley, who were largely metropolitan and liberal; Derek Draper, of Labour, had got to know this group reasonably well; Matthew d'Ancona, editor of The Spectator; Patrick Rock; the Conservative A-List was created to acquire a wider type of Conservative candidate, but Tim Montgomerie thought it would be the 'K&C list', as most candidates originated from that London borough; George Monbiot was invited to address the Conservative conference, but to no great effect; the Conservative Tax Reform Commission, from 2005-06, recommended £21bn of tax cuts. Directed by Richard Sanders, made by Juniper. Much of what was discussed would be found in Peter Hitchen's 2009 book The Broken Compass
- 2 April Undercover Prisoner, about HM Prison North Sea Camp; North Sea Camp was for low risk prisoners, being filmed in December 2006; fifteen open prisons housed around 5,000 men, under Category D; North Sea Camp had 300, where 49 prisoners absconded in 2006; 42 year old television executive Dafydd Evans from Penylan, with broadcaster Tinopolis, was sentenced to 27 months for death by dangerous driving on 28 February 2006 at Swansea court by Eleri Rees, with four months at North Sea Camp, where he had unsupervised visits outside, where he met the Dispatches team, and agreed to report undercover; Evans had also been in Cardiff and Swansea prisons; Mr Evans had killed motorcyclist 24-year-old Darren Beynon on the A40 at Dryslwyn, near Llandeilo, on Sunday 31 October 2004, when amongst a convoy of motorcyclists heading down the A40, and hit by the Mercedes vehicle of Evans, at Cwrt Henri crossroads; Mr Evans was subsequently tracked down for two hours by a police helicopter with an infrared camera and police dogs, but Evans was at a friend's house, three miles away, at Nantgaredig; filming in prison, Evans attends compliance drug testing, part of the Drug Interventions Programme (known as MDT, introduced in 2001); 1 in 5 at North Sea Camp failed the drugs test, but some took others urine for the test; David Ramsbotham, Baron Ramsbotham was HM Chief Inspector of Prisons from 1995 to 2001; buprenorphine, known as Subutex, was given as a replacement for consumers of drugs, but was also inadvertently popular with consumers of drugs in prison; the prisoners were allowed mobile phones in prison; open prisons were mostly understaffed; a prisoner described new prisoners as 'new meat'; the prison had a woodworking club, which was popular, but it closed, with other clubs; the biggest social problem at the prison was the heavy consumption of drugs; Harry Fletcher of the National Association of Probation Officers trade union; identity cards were infrequently checked; Brian James Waite received 11 years for robbery and arson on 15 September 2003 at Cardiff court, when aged 33, and escaped in December 2006; Waite hit security guard Robert Williams with a 3 ft scaffolding pole, and took £25,000 from a Securicor van at a HSBC branch in Llanishen, in the north of Cardiff, on 2 November 2001; it was believed that Waite absconded to the Netherlands, and would be sent to prison seven years later; Evans was caught filming on 17 January 2007 and given 30 more days in prison. From October 2001 to September 2002 Jeffrey Archer had attended the prison. Narrated by Ian Curtis, produced by Steve Boulton, directed by Jane Drinkwater
- 18 June Drinking Yourself to Death, about alcoholic liver disease in Britain; seven million people in Britain drink too much; hospital admissions for alcohol-induced liver disease had doubled in Britain from ten years previously, and the average age had moved from the age of 60 to 40; Jan Freeman of Derby City Hospital, who had a death from the condition of a patient aged 22; Finsbury Square in London; the former Queen Elizabeth Hospital in Birmingham; a large glass of wine contains 3.5 units; the Royal Free Hospital; modest amounts of regular wine consumption will lead to liver disease, as the liver does not get the required time to recuperate; Centenary Square; supermarkets 50% of Britain's wine, and 20% of British beer; the annual British beer trade show in April 2007, at the Olympia exhibition hall; the Association of Licensed Multiple Retailers; the annual London International Wine & Spirits Fair at ExCeL London in May 2007; British wine consumption had increased by 50% in ten years; Jeremy Beadles of the Wine and Spirit Trade Association; Prof Ian Gilmore of the Royal College of Physicians; the headquarters of the Brewers of Europe trade group was situated near to the European Parliament; the British Beer and Pub Association; Alison Rogers of The British Liver Trust; Lib Dem MP Nick Harvey and Conservative MP Julie Kirkbride both drank regularly. Reported by Deborah Davies, produced by Eamonn Matthews, directed by Charlie Hawes
- 6 August Britain Under Attack, about Muslim preachers
- 10 September The Olympic Cash Machine, about the 2012 Olympic Games in London, and the money paid to executives; Paul Deighton, Baron Deighton, the chief executive of LOCOG received £536,000, and Jonathan Edwards (triple jumper) received £87,000 as a 'consultant'
- 1 October Immigrants: The Inconvenient Truth
- 8 October China's Stolen Children. Won the 2008 BAFTA TV Award for Best Current Affairs, and the BAFTA TV Factual Award for Best Director
- 17 October Abortion: What We Need to Know, about abortion, and whether 20-week-old foetuses could feel pain; it featured the doctor Kate Guthrie;6.7 million abortions had been carried out since 1967. It was discussed in parliament by Nadine Dorries in November 2008. Discussed in the House of Lords on 21 November 2007 by Labour Tony Clarke, Baron Clarke of Hampstead .

=== 2008 ===
- 10 January The Truth about your Food
- 21 January, about local government in London
- 19 May In God's Name, by David Modell, which followed the head of Christian Concern, Andrea Minichiello Williams
- 28 April The Mobile Phone Rip Off. An EDM was tabled on 29 April 2008 by Roger Godsliff
- 26 May The Warlords Next Door?, about Somalia, featured Mark Malloch Brown, reported by Aidan Hartley, directed by Adam Wishart, discussed in parliament in June 2008 by George Galloway
- 21 July The Jab that can stop Cancer
- 25 August How the Banks Never Lose, about mortgage defaults; the big five had 44% of mortgages; Roger Bootle and Chris Blackhurst, City Editor of the Evening Standard. Reported by James Max
- 15 September What's in your Wine?, about the British wine industry, and practices; in 2007, Britain drank 1.5bn bottles of wine; there are no EU laws for wine producers to list contents; five main wine producers sell the most in Britain - Hardys, Blossom Hill, Jacob's Creek, Gallo and Stowells, in total selling £1bn; Malcolm Gluck, who wrote The Great Wine Swindle; the French Appellation d'origine contrôlée (AOC) label in France; organic wine producer Nicolas Joly; Olivier Andrault of UFC-Que Choisir; Randall Grahm of Bonny Doon Vineyard who had a dispute with the Wine and Spirit Trade Association; John Corbet-Milward of the WSTA; the French produce over 300m bottles of champagne a year; Moët & Chandon, Veuve Clicquot and Champagne Lanson sell the most in Britain, in total £80m, but were not the best by content; in a taste test, consumers prefer the cheaper sparkling wine; champagne producer Anselme Selosse; Françoise Peretti of the CIVC; soil scientist Claude Bourguignon; organic champagne producer David Léclapart; Emiliano Fittipaldi of Italy and his investigation in April 2008, in L'Espresso, of Brunellopoli. Reported by Jane Moore, produced by Mark Fielder, directed by Tom Anstiss, made by Quickfire
- 29 September Cameron's Money Men, about donations to the Conservative party; about Bearwood Corporate Services and Lord Ashcroft, an investigation with 'The Sunday Times'. Discussed in parliament on 20 October 2008 by Labour MP Tony Lloyd.
- 6 October The Hidden World of Lap Dancing, about regulation of lap dancing clubs in Britain; the Secrets club in Holborn in central London, on a Tuesday; the Wildcats club in Blackpool on a Wednesday; the Halos club in Newquay on a Friday; Lynda Waltho, Labour MP for Stourbridge; Tracy Earnshaw of Newquay; Dan Rogerson, Lib Dem MP for North Cornwall; Sandrine Leveque of the Object Campaign; Wade in the Water music; the Licensing Act meant that licences were now issued by less-prudish local authorities, not magistrates; Simon Hickson of St Katharine Docks, where a Secrets club opened; Stourbridge had two clubs; the Heaven club was opposite a 6th form college; in 2008 the Barbarella club opened next to the Labour MP's office; the Capricorn Club near Goodge Street tube station; six clubs opened in Blackpool; Prof Marion Roberts, who worked with the local government select committee. Narrated by Mark Bonnar, produced by Steve Boulton
- 12 November Saving Africa's Witch Children. Won the 2009 BAFTA TV Award for Best Current Affairs

=== 2009 ===
- 5 January Britain's Challenging Children, filmed in Luton, Wigan and Glasgow; about primary school children; in 2007, around 18,000 primary school children were suspended for violence; and in the previous academic year police were called to 7,300 violent incidents at schools
- 22 June Rape in the City, about multiple-perpertrator rape and incidence involving ethnic-minority individuals. In 2008 the Met Police had 85 reports of gang rape. The programme looked at 29 cases from January 2006 to March 2009, with 92 youths being convicted. 66 were black or mixed race, around 12 were white, and the rest from Afghanistan, Iraq and Libya. The males would have 'line ups', where one girl would be made to perform oral sex on six to seven males, which could be filmed on a mobile phone or carried out at school. Reported by Sorious Samura
- 7 September Battle Scarred, about soldiers returning from Afghanistan and Iraq
- 7 December Christmas on Credit, about extortionate home credit services. An EDM was tabled by Ian McCartney

=== 2010 ===
- 15 February Kids Don't Count, 155 primary school teachers sat a Maths test designed for 11-year-old children, discussed in parliament on 8 March 2010 by David Davis
- 1 March Britain's Islamic Republic, about fundamentalist Muslim methods of entryism in east London; the East London Mosque in Whitechapel, the largest in Europe, and Muhammad Abdul Bari; Princes Charles visited on 27 November 2001, and it had received £10m of government money; Anwar al-Awlaki; the Islamic Forum of Europe (IFE) was headquartered at the mosque; Houriya Ahmed of the Centre for Social Cohesion; the Young Muslim Organisation was also headquartered at the mosque; the book Khutabat: Fundamentals of Islam by Abul A'la Maududi, published in 1988; Labour MP Jim Fitzpatrick (politician); Abjol Miah of the Respect Party; Labour councillor Lutfur Rahman and infiltration by the IFE; Ted Jeory of the East London Advertiser; Mulberry Place; Brian Coleman; Easy Talk on Muslim Community Radio; the IFE infiltrated the Muslim Council of Britain. Produced by Steve Boulton, directed by Jane Drinkwater
- 23 August When Cousins Marry; half of British Pakistanis marry their first cousin; the Mucolipidosis type IV disorder, causing blindness; the reporter's grandparents were first cousins, with five of their daughters dying in childhood, and three of her uncles being born deaf; in Bradford 75% of Pakistanis married their first cousin; 4-10% of children from these marriages had genetic disorders, with a third of children with these disorders dying before the age of five; in Birmingham, 50% of Pakistanis married their first cousin, a form of consanguinity; a third of children in Britain with genetic disorders were Pakistani, often with kidney or liver disorders; the propionic acidemia hereditary condition, which damages the liver; geneticist Prof Marcus Pembrey; British Pakistanis were three times more likely to have children with a learning disability; it cost around £250,000 a year, each, to provide for such children; not many Labour MPs would discuss the subject, but Ann Cryer did. Reported by Tazeen Ahmad, produced by Allen Jewhurst, directed by Anshu Rastogi, made by Chameleon Television

=== 2011 ===
- 14 February Lessons in Hate and Violence, about the Darul Uloom, Birmingham, who were filmed chanting ostensible hatred against 'non-believers', such as Hindus; in a lesson, Muslim children were advocated towards war against America and also the Jews; due to the documentary, Ofsted investigated the school in May 2011, but mostly found nothing wrong; the school subsequently received many telephone 'hate calls' from unknown individuals; the Department for Education were alarmed by the documentary, notably what the headmaster, deputy headmaster, and religious studies teacher told the children; Ofsted gave the school an unannounced inspection in 2015
- 28 February Secret NHS Diaries
- 7 March Selling Off Britain, about the role of facilities companies such as Serco, G4S, and Capita, discussed in the House of Lords on 21 June 2012 by Labour Mike Watson, Baron Watson of Invergowrie
- 21 March Train Journeys from Hell
- 11 April Undercover Hospital, about the North Manchester General Hospital and the Royal Oldham Hospital, run by the Pennine Acute Hospitals NHS Trust and NHS North West. Discussed in parliament on 26 April 2011 by Labour MP Simon Danczuk, and on 17 January 2017 by Labour MP Graham Stringer
- 16 May The Truth About Going Under The Knife, about the medical device industry. An EDM was tabled on 17 May 2011 by Paul Flynn
- 23 May The Truth About Your Dentist, about NHS dentists, and whether dentists gave similar diagnoses, or not
- 4 July Landlords From Hell, discussed in parliament on 7 July 2011 by Labour MP Graham Jones
- 11 July How to Buy a Football Club, discussed in parliament on 9 February 2012 by Damian Collins
- 3 October Can you trust your doctor?
- 7 November Britain's Sex Gangs; 'Chloe' from Rotherham, aged around 12, was befriended by a group of Pakistani males in their late teens; a few months later 'Chloe' was introduced by these teenage males to a group of older Pakistani males; the females were given alcohol and cigarettes; the girls liked the attention; but the girls were soon brutally raped by multiple Pakistani older males; 'Chloe' would now be raped every day, always after school, in various places, such as parks and flats; despite being systematically gang-raped, the police did not prosecute anyone who had raped and kidnapped 'Chloe'; nine Pakistani males were convicted of grooming 27 girls, aged 12–16 in Derby, investigated by Detective Superintendent Debbie Platt, of Derbyshire Police; the investigation began on 30 December 2008, with information from nearby Staffordshire, when two 14-year-old girls had been arrested with three Pakistani older males; this now identified a group of males, and the police, to their credit, quickly believed that it was organised crime; the males were convicted in January 2011; Peter Davies of CEOP. Produced Brian Woods, directed Anna Hall, made by True Vision

=== 2012 ===
- 6 August Britain's High Street Gamble, Labour MP Harriet Harman said that the Gambling Act 2005 was a mistake, and had ruined high streets, discussed in parliament on 16 October 2013 by Conservative MP Andrew Griffiths
- 13 August Tricks Of The Dole Cheats; Alay Pain, from north London was 25, and gave the job centre 2 out of 10; Joe Paxton, from Shropshire was 30, and did not have great faith in the job centre; Joe, on his Job Seeker Agreement had to complete 14 tasks per week, and Alay had to provide evidence of looking for three jobs; Martin Archer was a former job centre advisor; Ruth Owen was the director of Jobcentre Plus; Job Seeker Agreements would be replaced by Claimant Commitments; there was £1.5bn of fraud a year; the Work Programme had unpaid work; when Lucia Borracino looked at starting her own company, the job centre were lukewarm; Lucia now looked for staff, with adverts in local shops and cafes, instead. Reported by Morland Sanders, produced by Karen Edwards, directed by Richard Sanders, made by Blakeway
- 29 October Getting Rich on the NHS; Kings Heath in Northampton, with a medical centre run by Virgin Care; Christian Wolmar; Roy Lilley; Sir Andrew Haines; Peter Holbrook of Social Enterprise UK; Laurence Buckman of the BMA. Reported by Morland Sanders, produced by Adam Jessel and Karen Edwards, directed by Claire Burnett

=== 2013 ===
- 4 February Plebs, Lies and Videotape, nominated for the Best Current Affairs Programme 2014, Broadcast Awards
- 17 April Syria: Across the Lines. Reported by Olly Lambert. Won the 2014 BAFTA TV Award for Best Current Affairs
- 23 May The Hunt for Britain's Sex Gangs, about the Telford child sexual exploitation scandal; by September 2010, Telford police had been operating Operation Chalice for 12 months; 14-year-old girls were raped, to see 'who was the best', then taken to Birmingham, to be plied with bottles of Bacardi; the girls were violently raped; a teenage witness recalls, whilst herself being raped by two males, a nearby locked room with other girls inside, screaming, whilst being raped by multiple males; the offenders were all Pakistani males; the parents of the girls reported them missing to the police over seventy times, but only when a girl made the first complaint 18 months later, did the police start to investigate anything; in early December 2009, with not enough evidence, DCI Edwards arrests nine male suspects in Wellington, Shropshire; nine girls give evidence, and identify the suspects; 22 year old Ahdel Ali, known as 'Eddie', and 26 year old Mubarek Ali, known as 'Max' of Regent Street in Wellington; with three other suspects (23 year old Mohammed Ali Sultan of Victoria Avenue in Wellington), Ahdel and Mubarek are released on bail, and immediately threaten the female witnesses with violence; fifty police officers are now investigating by September 2010; DCI Neil Jamieson is leading the investigation; girls were held hostage for over ten hours, being constantly raped; one female wrote a list of names of over a hundred male offenders; police believed that there were around two hundred male offenders; the police had not encountered such offences before; after one teenage female was initially raped, a few days later, the male offender would be accompanied by his cousin, and brother, and uncle; DS Sophie Wade sees the traits of the male offenders; the police realise that there is scarce forensic evidence; Sheila Taylor identified trafficking methods, and psychological manipulation in Derby; in being trafficked, a teenage female was passed around a total of 72 males, part of nine groups across England; with mobile phone records, and copious ANPR evidence, the Pakistani males could be tracked to a few square metres over months; when being rearrested, simpleton Ahdel Ali makes threats to the police; graphic text messages on the offenders' mobile phones will inevitably incriminate them, and could identify other possible offenders; from the text message evidence, a common place to meet the girls was the 'hospital bus stop'; the teenage girls were often referred to as 'bitch' or 'whore'; on 2 November 2010, simpleton Ahdel Ali is interviewed by police, informing the police that he did not rape the teenage girl, but admitting that he 'had sex with her'; the CPS decides not to take the series of rapes to court as the victim could be portrayed as an unreliable witness; court begins on 16 May 2011, with nine Pakistani men on trial, seven being married, and one a grandfather, with 47 charges; seven teenage girls give evidence; girls were exchanged at the Lal Komal restaurant in Oakengates, the Dhaka Tandoori on Tan Bank in Wellington, and Thiara's Fish Bar on Haybridge Road in Hadley, by Mubarek Ali, where they were gang raped by workers at the restaurant, up to four times a week; the court lasts for four months, where the girls are constantly accused of being a compulsive liar, in legal cross-examination; the court finishes on 6 September 2011, and all the Pakistani males walk free, due to inadequate female witness testimony; on 8 August 2012 at Worcester Crown Court, the offenders are finally convicted; in October 2012 24-year-old Ahdel Ali receives 18 years, and 29-year-old Mubarek Ali receives 14 years; six other offenders are convicted in December 2012. Reported by Tazeen Ahmad, produced by Brian Woods, directed by Anna Hall, made by True Vision North. Nominated for Best Current Affairs Programme 2014, Broadcast Awards.
- 24 June The Police's Dirty Secret, about squalid sexual relationships between undercover police and females in protest movements, the UK undercover policing relationships scandal; Peter Francis was in the Special Demonstration Squad (SDS) of Special Branch, where he was known as Pete Black; in 1993 he joined Youth against Racism in Europe, where he became a (convincing) branch secretary; Bob Lambert (undercover police officer) who was now a university lecturer, who had infiltrated the ALF; a female ALF protester knew Bob Lambert as Bob Robinson; Bob also had a wife and two children; in late 1985 Bob's son was born; Bob subsequently met 24 year old Belinda Harvey, who was not part of any protest group; animal rights protester Helen Steel attended London Greenpeace meetings in 1987, where she met fellow protester John Barker, who was really the police officer John Dines; Helen would know the police office for two years; the National Public Order Intelligence Unit superseded the SDS in 2008; SDS officer Mark Jenner lived with a female protester for four years, as Mark Cassidy; Mark Kennedy (police officer) had undercover relationships with female protesters across Europe, with one relationship being of six years; Chief Constable Mick Creedon, of Operation Herne. Reported by Paul Lewis (journalist), produced by George Waldrum, directed by Katherine Churcher, made by ITN Productions
- 21 October Secrets of Your Pay Packet, about the deployment of zero-hour contracts, and rates of pay, discussed in parliament on 23 October 2013 by Labour MP Andy Sawford, who had taken part in the documentary and again on 15 January 2014
- 4 November Energy Bills Exposed; Neil Clitheroe of Scottish Power; Paul Massera of npower; Hither Green in south west London; the typical British annual energy bill was £1,400; Will Morris of SSE plc; forensic accountant Richard Murphy (tax campaigner); the top six energy companies each paid around £700m in dividends; Stephen Fitzpatrick of OVO Energy; Glasgow Labour MP John Robertson. Reported by Harry Wallop, produced by Denman Rooke, directed by Joanna Potts, made by October Films. Discussed in parliament on 26 March 2014 by SNP MP Mike Weir.
- 25 November Britain's Big Fat Bill, about obesity in the United Kingdom; there were 1.5m morbidly obese people in the UK; Norma Mills was 5 ft 6 and 20 stone; for her obesity she took Xenical (Orlistat); Prof Mike Lean of the University of Glasgow; British hospitals were seeing eleven times as many obese patients from ten years before; it cost the NHS £5.1bn; Prof Nick Finer of UCL; bariatric surgery at St George's Hospital in Tooting; surgeon Paul Super in Birmingham; John Coakley, medical director of Homerton University Hospital. Reported by Tazeen Ahmad, produced by Charlotte Rowles, directed by Matt Haan, made by Watershed Television

=== 2014 ===
- 22 January Children on the Frontline. Won the 2015 BAFTA TV Award for Best Current Affairs
- 24 February Secrets of Your Credit Rating, Dispatches visited the Nottingham site of Experian, without Experian knowing; financial writer Sarah Pennells; there are three main credit rating agencies in the UK, Experian, Equifax and Callcredit; in the small print of credit agreements, information is allowed to be given to some of the agencies; John and Rebecca of the Leyland Band, who were husband and wife; teacher Ros Canning; James Jones of Experian; Experian's office in central Nottingham, with an undercover Dispatches reporter Georgia Boulton, purporting to be an employee, where the employee is trained about the Merlin and Portal systems; credit reports are assigned via a 'potential alias', introduced in 2001, which is not a 100% identification, and can be merely a lucky guess; Damon Gibbons of the Centre for Responsible Credit; Labour MP John Mann, Baron Mann had his credit report mixed up with another John Mann with the same date of birth, to detriment of his credit rating; the Federal Trade Commission; Reported by Morland Sanders, produced by Steve Boulton, directed by Sarah Hey, made by Nine Lives
- 17 March Food: What's Really in Your Trolley, featured Andy Foster, from the Trading Standards Institute, discussed in parliament on 2 April 2014 by Labour MP Kerry McCarthy
- 2 June Tricks of the Junk Food Business; since April 2007, the advertising of junk food has been restricted by Ofcom on early evening television; the advertising industry have £5.5bn of internet advertising, where restrictions on advertising junk food can be bypassed; Malcolm Clark, who was responsible for the Soft Drinks Industry Levy; Stephan Dahl and advertising for Krave (cereal); Richmond Park Academy in south west London; Jennifer Harris and advergames; Miniclip and Gerard Hastings of the University of Stirling; Cadbury and Coca-Cola had free advergames on ITunes; Koko Digital agency of Keele University Science & Business Park. Reported by Harry Wallop, directed Marc Sigsworth, made by Matchlight
- 7 July The Great British Break-up?, about whether the SNP told Scottish businesses to keep quiet about possible effects of independence, such as the Scotch Whisky Association

=== 2015 ===
- 12 January How to Blow Your Pension, about changes in private pension legislation in April 2015, giving people aged 55 more flexibility, discussed in the House of Lords by Labour Jeannie Drake, Baroness Drake
- 19 January Low Pay Britain, discussed during Prime Minister's Questions by Labour MP Mary Glindon
- 23 February Politicians for Hire, about MPs collusion for financial reimbursement, in an operation, it featured Paul Strasburger, Baron Strasburger of the Lib Dems
- 16 March Britain's Defence Squeeze
- 1 April How Safe Are Our Planes?
- 1 June Trains: Are You Paying Too Much?, about the cheapest rail tickets were available
- 15 June Exams: Cheating the System
- 15 July Escape from ISIS. Won the Best Current Affairs Programme 2016, Broadcast Awards
- 26 October How To Stop Your Nuisance Calls, about the many tactics deviously deployed by telephone cold callers, such as the technique known as sugging
- 7 December Low Pay Britain II, about apprenticeship schemes at the retailer Next; Next was given £1.8m of public money in 2014 for training 800 apprentices; the documentary claimed that the wage of £3.30 an hour was lower than £6.70 an hour for workers over 21, which would have saved Next £2.5m; Next had 583 apprentices, discussed in the House of Lords on 14 December 2015, where it was said that apprenticeships in motor vehicle, construction and engineering industries were of a good standard, but those in other industries were nothing like as good

=== 2016 ===
- 7 March Council House Millionaires, discussed in the House of Lords on 8 March 2016 by Labour Patricia Hollis, Baroness Hollis of Heigham
- 22 February Dirty Secrets: What's really in our air, about air pollution; Edinburgh Royal Infirmary, and cardiologist David Newby of the Committee on the Medical Effects of Air Pollutants; Ben Barratt of KCL; Jonathan Grigg, of Queen Mary London, looked at the effects of air pollution on children; John Thornes of the University of Birmingham and nitrogen dioxide at railway stations. Reported by Morland Sanders, produced by Eamonn Matthews, directed Roger Corke, and made by Quicksilver
- 18 April ISIS and the Missing Treasures, discussed in the House of Lords on 6 June 2016 by Lib Dem Jane Bonham Carter, Baroness Bonham-Carter of Yarnbury, herself a former documentary producer and on 28 June 2016 by Nicholas Trench, 9th Earl of Clancarty
- 11 July Racist Britain, which investigated the effects of Britain voting to leave the EU in June 2016, as well as recent terrorist attacks, featuring Hope not Hate
- 3 October, about an anti-abortion organisation, the Good Counsel Network or GCN, which campaigned outside abortion clinics in Twickenham, founded by Clare McCullough
- 31 October The Secret Plan to Save Fat Britain, discussed in parliament on 15 November 2016 by SNP MP Stuart McDonald

=== 2017 ===
- 20 February Supermarkets: Brexit and Your Shrinking Shop, about shrinkflation of confectionery and supermarket staple products, with Vickie Sheriff of Which?
- 27 February Inside Britain's Airports
- 30 October Is Britain Full?, about the economic geography of the UK and where university graduates worked; the reporter Michael visits Liverpool, Britain's seventh largest city, with half the number of people that the city had in 1931; housing officer Ronnie Hughes, aged 63; when Britain joined Europe in 1973, Liverpool was in the wrong strategic place; from 1971, 100,000 Liverpool people moved out in ten years; there were 24,000 empty properties in the Merseyside region; Manchester had lost 25% of its population from 1921, and Glasgow had lost 42%; Andrew Carter, of the Centre for Cities research group; property developer Marta de Sousa; the 2017 Liverpool Careers Fair, and University of Liverpool student Beth Heron; Britain had 1.7 million undergraduates, across 166 universities, with 25% working in London, within three years; the Liverpool average salary was £27,000, with London being £36,000; economic geographer Prof Philip McCann; Gurnek Bains, of the economic think tank Global Future; Mark Whitworth of the new Liverpool2 container terminal; Jim O'Neill, Baron O'Neill of Gatley was made Commercial Secretary to the Treasury in 2015, to assist with the Northern Powerhouse. Reported by Michael Buerk, produced by George Waldrum and Chris Shaw, directed by Simon Barnes, made by ITN Productions
- 6 November Trouble on the Trains, about the new Transport for the North, discussed in parliament by Labour MP Dan Jarvis
- 9 November The Fight for Mosul. Won Best Documentary Programme 2019, Broadcast Awards
- 8 December Al Fayed Behind Closed Doors, about horrendous sexual assault allegations against Al-Fayed, which would not be taken seriously enough until 2024

=== 2018 ===
- 26 February Britain's University Spending Scandal, about university vice-chancellors and the spurious bizarre expenses claims that some flagrantly make, possibly corruptly
- 5 March Undercover: Who's Policing Your Bank, questioning whether the Financial Ombudsman Service conducted investigations sufficiently or thoroughly; the Treasury Select Committee and Consumer Credit Trade Association were not convinced. Discussed in parliament on 10 May 2018 by Conservative MP Neil O'Brien.
- 25 March Russian Spy Assassins: The Salisbury Attack, about the Salisbury poisonings; Anthony Glees; through the Spanish Secret Service, Skripal was recruited to MI6; Skripal would meet a Russian-speaking gentleman once a month at the Cote Brasserie in Salisbury, possibly a former MI6 contact; former Ambassador to Russia, Sir Andrew Wood (diplomat), who believed that Putin was vindictive; Alexander Nekrassov; Daniel Hoffman, formerly of the CIA in Russia; Hamish de Bretten; Skripal's son had died aged 44 in 2017; Bill Browder enabled the Magnitsky Act, and feared Russian retribution; Russian telecommunications entrepreneur Evgeny Chichvarkin moved to the UK in 2008; Heidi Blake investigated Russian assassinations; Nikolai Glushkov died on March 12 2018, a colleague of Boris Berezovsky (businessman) who moved to the UK in 2000, and worked with Badri Patarkatsishvili; Scot Young died in December 2014, he met regularly with Boris Berezovsky, in a Mayfair restaurant Cipriani London, with four other entrepreneurs; Michelle Young, his former wife, believed the death was not an accident; Johnny Elichaoff, former husband of Trinny Woodall, fell from a shopping centre roof in 2014; 47 year old Robert Curtis fell under a tube train at Kingsbury tube station in December 2012; entrepreneur Paul Castle fell under a tube train at Bond Street station in November 2010; these five males were the 'Cipriani Five'. Reported by Matt Frei, produced George Waldrum and Andy Dunn, directed by Duncan Staff, made by ITN
- 14 May Myanmar's Killing Fields. Made with PBS. Won the 2019 BAFTA TV Award for Best Current Affairs
- 23 July Homeless and Working, discussed in the House of Lords on 12 September 2018 by Lib Dem Rosalind Grender, Baroness Grender and in parliament on 14 June 2022 by Labour MP Rosie Duffield
- 8 September Massacre at Ballymurphy, about the Ballymurphy massacre, in August 1971. An EDM was tabled on 11 September 2018 by Hywel Williams
- 8 October Lawless Britain: Where are the Police?, about Bedfordshire Police and how often it investigated burglary, or (mostly) did not, discussed in parliament on 29 October 2018 by Labour MP Mohammad Yasin and again on 7 February 2019

=== 2019 ===
- 11 February, HS2: The Great Train Robbery, with Liam Halligan, about the true, or likely, cost of HS2; the documentary believed that HS2 would get no further north than Birmingham; it featured Prof Stephen Glaister, former chairman of the Office of Rail and Road until 2018
- 25 March New Landlords From Hell, about Sanctuary Housing, discussed in parliament on 18 July 2019 by Conservative MP Mark Francois
- 1 April Britain's Hidden War, about British companies assisting the Saudi-led intervention in the Yemeni civil war. Reported by Sue Turton. Discussed during Prime Minister's Questions on 10 April 2019 by Labour MP Gill Furniss and in the House of Lords on 20 June 2019 by Labour Wilf Stevenson, Baron Stevenson of Balmacara
- 10 June Britain's Toxic Air Scandal, featured Frank J Kelly, professor of Environmental Health, directed by Sue Medhurst, made by Love Productions. Discussed in the House of Lords on 11 June 2019 by the Earl of Listowel and Lib Dem Jenny Randerson, Baroness Randerson.

=== 2020 ===
- 16 March Britain's Train Hell, about traffic bottlenecks in the British rail network, such as the Castlefield corridor, discussed in parliament on 17 March 2020 by Labour MP Andy McDonald

=== 2021 ===
- 29 March The Black Maternity Scandal. Discussed in parliament on 19 April 2021 by Labour MP Catherine McKinnell.
- 11 October Cops on Trial; a bipolar woman reports a boyfriend posting unsolicited content of her; a male police officer visits her house to interview her, views the explicit content, and gives her his Instagram details, and they meet up socially; the officer was investigated and found to have committed gross misconduct, but he resigned before any further investigation; forensic psychologist Terri Cole of Bournemouth University; in four years, around 2,000 male police personnel had been accused of sexual misconduct, with 370 alleged sexual assaults, and 100 alleged rapes; Alan Butler of Warwickshire Police took advantage his position; around 250 police personnel had been accused of this offence over four years; there are around 150,000 police officers in the UK; Glasgow police officer Fraser Ross battered his girlfriend for six years, but escaped jail, keeping his police pension, as he had resigned; Police Scotland had 166 personnel accused of misconduct in four years, but none were dismissed; Susannah Fish, former chief constable of Nottinghamshire Police; Louisa Rolfe of the National Police Chiefs' Council. Reported by Ellie Flynn, produced by George Waldrum, directed by Ben Ryder, made by ITN Productions. Discussed in the House of Lords on 1 November 2021 by Lord Coaker.
- 25 October Growing Up Poor: Britain's Hidden Homeless Kids, discussed in the House of Lords on 28 October 2021 by Labour Denis Tunnicliffe, Baron Tunnicliffe
- 8 November Rape: Who's on Trial?, featured Avon and Somerset Police. Discussed in parliament on 9 November 2021 by Labour MP Anna McMorrin
- 22 November The Truth About Electric Cars, discussed in parliament on 30 March 2022 by Sir Bill Wiggin

=== 2023 ===
- 12 February Strippers, Spies and Russian Money; Conservative chairman Greg Hands meets Russian Alexander Kashitsyn at a Fulham pub in 2005, and is interviewed by MI6 in 2006; Marina Litvinenko, wife of Alexander Litvinenko; Christopher Steele formerly of MI6; Prime Minister David Cameron opens relations with Russia; Sergei Cristo, of the Conservative party, meets Sergey Nalobin, son of a KGB agent, but he is suspicious and reports Nalobin to MI5; MI5 take no interest; Nalobin attends the launch of Conservative Friends of Russia, in August 2012, now called the Westminster Russia Forum, with chairman Richard Royal; David Rose (journalist) was suspicious of the Conservative group, and attends a visit with the group; Michael Weiss (journalist) of the Free Russia Foundation, and the Russian technique of Kompromat, to discredit individuals by publishing humiliating photographs; senior Conservative ministers attend an event on 24 June 2013 at The Hurlingham Club in Fulham, with Vasily Shestakov (Василий Борисович Шестаков); former diplomat Simon McDonald, Baron McDonald of Salford; Sir Bill Browder, involved with the US Magnitsky Act; Greg Barker, Baron Barker of Battle became chairman of En+ Group, of Oleg Deripaska, in October 2017; the company had been sanctioned by the US Office of Foreign Assets Control in 2015; the Intelligence and Security Committee of Parliament, with chairman Dominic Grieve, published its Intelligence and Security Committee Russia report in March 2019; Richard Brooks (journalist), of Private Eye, looked into Ehud Sheleg, who made a large donation to the Conservative party in 2018. Narrated by Caroline Catz, produced by Claire Burnett, directed by Simon Rawles, made by Hardcash Productions
- 12 December The Truth About Food Prices; Lisa Webb of Which?; Adam Leyland, editor of The Grocer; Skimpflation; food technologist Rob Winwood; the cost of wheat and cooking oil in 2022 was two thirds higher than in 2019; filled milk powder is added to dairy products to cut corners; a reformulated Tesco Beef Lasagne had lost ingredients, adding mushrooms and salt; modified starch is often added to ultra processed food products, as a replacement for expensive cooking oil, to bulk out convenience foods, but it offers limited nutritional content; Gleb Yakubov, professor of food physics at the University of Nottingham; Ingredion is a main manufacturer of modified starch for the British food industry; dietitian Priya Tew; in two years, Hellmann's Mayonnaise, made by Unilever, went from £1.49 to £2.65, McVities milk chocolate digestives went from £1.35 to £1.90, and Heinz Tomato Ketchup went from £2.80 to £4.25; Lisa Jack, professor of accounting of the University of Portsmouth; retailing consultant David Sable; Tesco launched its Club Card, with television adverts with Prunella Scales; loyalty card prices were not anything like as transparent as you may think; loyalty cards reveal deep consumer insights about the price elasticity of demand of each product, and the dynamics of threshold prices required to tempt consumers to switch preferred makes of product. Reported by Harry Wallop, produced by Nicole Kleeman, directed by Tim Dowse, made by Firecrest Films.

=== 2024 ===
- 16 July Britain's Unsolved Crimewave, about the unwillingness of the police to investigate neighbourhood bike and phone theft; bike theft in Cambridge; private companies now operate tracing stolen bikes; Cambridge railway station had 300 unsolved bike thefts in three years; the TV production team leave a locked decoy bike, similar to the method of a bait car, near the station, which is stolen late at night, two days later, and finds its way to Saffron Walden, with the bike on eBay for £650; under the noses of Essex Police, the same eBay vendor has ten other bikes for sale; the reporter visits the Essex address, along with a security guard; the brazen eBay vendor claimed to have owned the bike 'for a year', and given the series of far-fetched claims made by this vendor about how the bike was acquired, there was enough suspicion that he was merely a consummate brazen thief, and had also been recently filmed elsewhere by another investigator of Cambridge bike theft, where he made similar claims; the area around Regent Street in London has the highest number of unsolved crimes (theft) in England and Wales, with more than 10,000 cases in the last three years, around nine unsolved thefts per day; the TV production team meet a prolific phone thief; Newham in London had some of the highest rates of street theft in England and Wales, notably near Westfield Stratford City and the railway station, with 98% unsolved by the police, with few suspects identified; the Met Police had a noted weakness with many areas of unsolved crimes, mostly theft; Sir Andy Cooke (police officer), former Chief Constable from 2016 to 2021 of Merseyside Police; many stolen mobile phones are shipped abroad to Shenzhen; the industry of organised theft of mobile phones was not thoroughly looked at by British police; 100 million phones ended up in Shenzhen each year, as nowhere else had the technical ability to unlock phones. Reported by Isobel Yeung, produced Nick Parnes, directed by Alex Nott, made by Kalel Productions.
- 25 November Britain's Shoplifting Gangs; £1.8bn was shoplifted in 2023, which police believed that one quarter was due to organised gangs; in October 2022, Morrisons noticed that the same types of high-value products were being taken, such as OTC medical and health products, from fifty four Morrisons stores; although all were caught and identified on CCTV, the individuals were not on British criminal databases, so would have to be of different nationality; stolen items were ending up in car boot sales in Essex, by Romanian individuals; on 5 February 2023, a Morrisons security guard in Norfolk recognises one of the four Romanian shoplifters, a female, in the store, and calls the Norfolk Police in that same second; Morrisons had given every store security guard a colour picture of the four Romanian shoplifters; when interviewed by Norfolk Police, the two arrested, Robert-Claudiu Alexe and Elena-Brindusa Efta, give valuable information, and name the leader of the shoplifters, called Zeno Gugulan, who fled back to Romania; it was called Operation Hemsworth; Zeno was known to the police in Northampton in 2019, and the Romanian shoplifters lived there; another Romanian group in Northampton thieved from Holland and Barrett across England, caught by Nottinghamshire Police. Reported by Matt Shea, directed by Alice McShane, made by Lion TV, part of All3Media
- 2 December Britain's Benefits Scandal

=== 2025 ===
- 19 June Britain's Car Theft Gangs; at 1.48am on February 5, 2025, a blue Audi A4 is stolen from a woman's house in north London; the Audi A4 has a tracking device; in England and Wales, 355 vehicles were stolen each day, one every four minutes; seven out of ten stolen cars are never recovered; in 2024, three in five cars stolen were by keyless ignition surveillance methods; two car thieves are interviewed, who would steal around 20 cars per month, receiving around £5,000 for a car such as a Range Rover Evoque; the cars would be shipped out to Albania, Bulgaria, Cyprus and Greece; 90% of the cars would be broken up for spare parts, being taken to a chop shop; GPS jamming was not difficult; Kent Police, and the Port of Dover Police, in Dover investigate freight vehicles, with success; car theft organised crime, in Essex, had connections to Lithuania; 11,000 containers left Felixstowe each day; National Vehicle Crime Intelligence Service (NAVCIS) had information on some organised car crime; the stolen Audi A4 tracker is now in Kaunas in Lithuania; Martin Clark ran the site in Essex. Reported by Matt Shea, produced Sally Wardle, directed Charlie Mole, made by Lion TV, part of All3Media

=== 2026 ===
- Britain's Gaza Secrets Exposed (11.05pm on 24 September 2026).
