= Myanmar's Killing Fields =

2018 British-American film by Paddy Wells

- Directed by: Patrick Wells
- Narrated by: Will Lyman
- Music by: Jonny Pilcher
- Countries of origin: United States; United Kingdom
- Original language: English

Production
- Executive producers: Raney Aronson-Rath (PBS); Dorothy Byrne (Channel 4); Siobhan Sinnerton (Channel 4)
- Producers: Dan Edge (senior); Patrick Wells; Evan Williams; Eve Lucas
- Cinematography: Patrick Wells
- Editor: Gary Beelders
- Running time: 53 minutes
- Production companies: Evan Williams Productions; Mongoose Pictures

Original release
- Network: PBS; Channel 4
- Release: May 8, 2018

Myanmar's Killing Fields is a 2018 British-American television documentary film about the Rohingya genocide in Myanmar. Produced by the American investigative journalism program Frontline on PBS, it investigates the origin of the humanitarian crisis in Myanmar as well as the ongoing situation of the Rohingya people. Shot and directed by Patrick Wells and reported by Evan Williams, the film aired on PBS in the United States on May 8, 2018, and on Channel 4 in the United Kingdom as part of the program Dispatches on May 14.

The documentary won the BAFTA Award for Best Current Affairs.

== Home media ==
The film was released on DVD by PBS on July 31, 2018. It was later made available by Frontline for streaming on YouTube without charge on February 17, 2021.

== Reception ==
Eric Black of MinnPost praised the film as "a horrifying and heartbreaking testimony to man's inhumanity to man."

== Accolades ==
Award	Ceremony date	Category	Subject	Result
British Academy Television Awards	May 12, 2019	Best Current Affairs	Myanmar's Killing Fields	Won
News and Documentary Emmy Awards	September 24, 2019	Outstanding Investigative Documentary	Myanmar's Killing Fields	Nominated
