= I-Min Lee =

Malaysian epidemiologist and professor

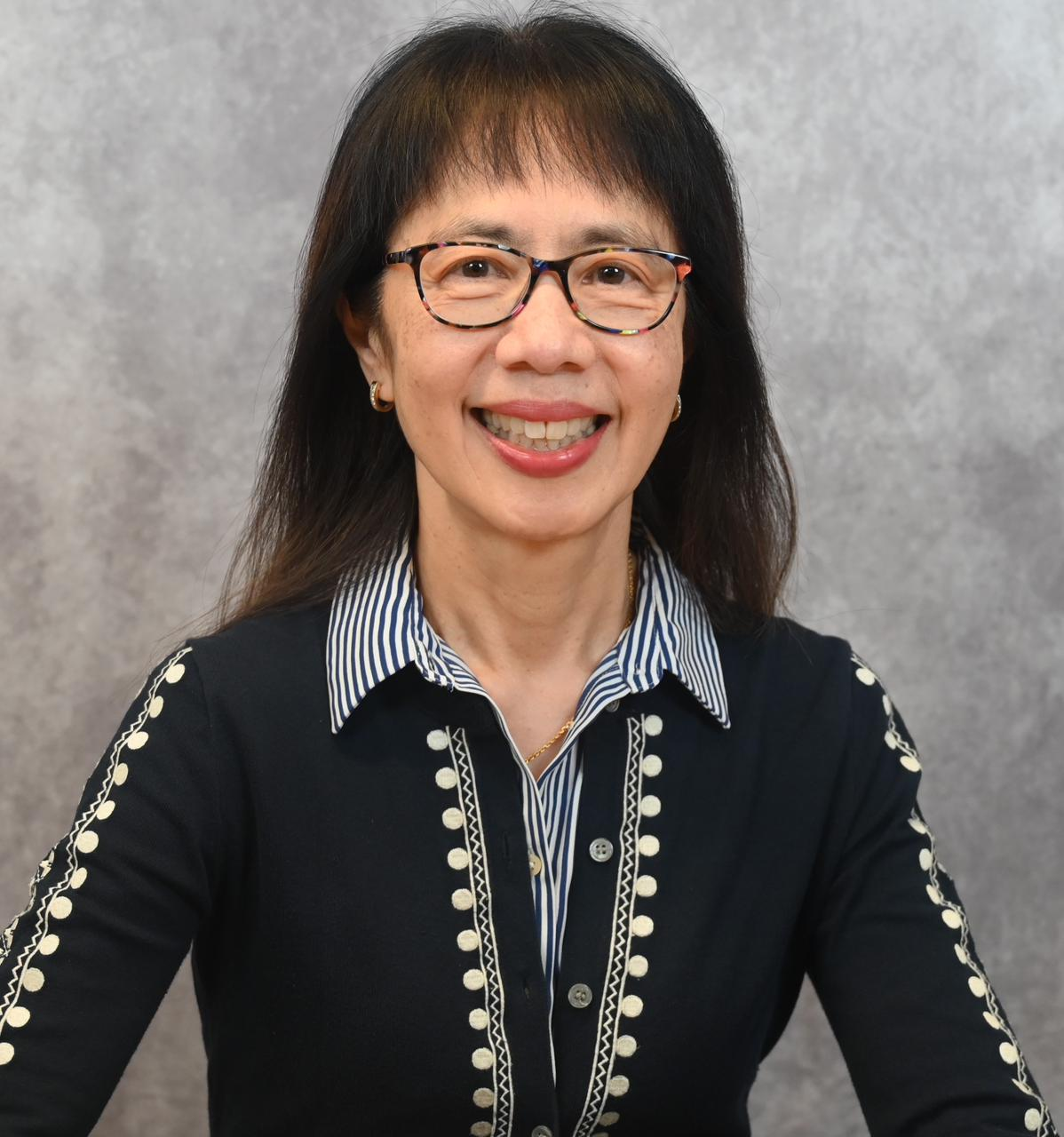
- Born: 1960 (age 65–66); Penang, Malaysia
- Education: National University of Singapore (MBBS) Harvard T.H. Chan School of Public Health (MPH, ScD)
- Known for: Physical activity epidemiology, global health
- Scientific career
- Fields: Epidemiology, Physical activity and health
- Workplaces: Harvard Medical School, Harvard T.H. Chan School of Public Health, Brigham & Women’s Hospital
- Doctoral advisor: Ralph S. Paffenbarger Jr.

I-Min Lee (born 1960) is a Malaysian epidemiologist, professor of medicine at Harvard Medical School, and professor of epidemiology at Harvard T.H. Chan School of Public Health. Her research focuses on the effects of physical activity on health and well-being.

== Early life and education ==
Lee was born in 1960 in Penang, Malaysia. She earned her MBBS degree in Medicine and Surgery at the National University of Singapore in 1984. She completed a Master of Public Health (MPH) degree at the Harvard School of Public Health in 1987 and a Doctor of Science (ScD) degree in Epidemiology in 1991 under the supervision of Ralph S. Paffenbarger Jr.

Before her research training, Lee undertook clinical and research posts in Singapore, including housemanship in obstetrics and gynecology, general surgery and internal medicine, and served as a medical officer in primary health care and research at the Ministry of Health, Singapore.

== Academic career ==
Lee began her faculty career as assistant professor of medicine at Harvard Medical School in 1993, was promoted to associate professor in 2001, and became full professor in 2012. She simultaneously held positions as assistant, associate, and full professor of epidemiology at the Harvard School of Public Health. Since 1993, she has been affiliated as an epidemiologist with Brigham & Women’s Hospital in Boston.

== Research contributions ==
Lee has published over 600 scientific articles. Her research focuses on several areas within physical activity epidemiology, including: (1) associations between physical activity and the prevention of non-communicable diseases and premature mortality; (2) dose–response relationships between physical activity and health outcomes; (3) objective measurement of physical activity and sedentary behavior in large population cohorts; (4) health effects of low levels of physical activity; and (5) the population-level impact of physical inactivity.

=== Physical activity and prevention of non-communicable diseases ===
Lee’s early influential work includes investigations from the Harvard Alumni Health Study, initially led by her doctoral advisor Paffenbarger, which she later inherited. At that time, there was little interest or knowledge in whether physical activity influenced cancer risk. Her doctoral work showed inverse associations to also exist between activity and cancer risk. Subsequently, Lee continued research into the role of physical activity for preventing non-communicable diseases (including coronary heart disease, stroke, type 2 diabetes, various cancers, and Parkinson’s Disease) and enhancing longevity using data from this study, the Women’s Health Study, and other cohorts. Her research findings are used to inform physical activity recommendations, including those from the 1995 Centers for Disease Control and Prevention/American College of Sports Medicine; the 1996 Surgeon General’s report on physical activity and health; and the inaugural (2008 US Physical Activity Guidelines) and 2^{nd} edition of the US federal guidelines (2018).

=== Dose-response relationships ===
As evidence accumulated on the importance of physical activity for health and well-being, Lee examined how more specific information could inform physical activity guidelines and clarify recommended practices. This work focused on dose–response relationships between physical activity and health outcomes. Her studies investigated questions such as how much physical activity is associated with health and weight management, the role of activity intensity, whether activity can be accumulated across multiple sessions or must occur in a single bout, whether irregular patterns such as “weekend warrior” activity provide health benefits, how sedentary behavior relates to health outcomes, and whether physical activity can mitigate the effects of prolonged sedentary time.

=== Objective measurement of activity ===
When wearable devices capable of measuring physical activity and sedentary behavior started becoming ubiquitous, Lee realized their potential for conducting more precise research in physical activity epidemiology. Prior to about 2010, studies in this field had primarily relied on self-reports of behavior. In 2011, Lee initiated one of the first large‑scale epidemiologic studies using accelerometers to objectively measure behavior among ~18,000 women in the Women’s Health Study, with follow‑up for long-term health outcomes. Her work in this domain helps to refine step‑count, intensity and patterns of activity in relation to health outcomes, information that is necessary for developing activity guidelines..

=== Small doses of physical activity ===
Using device-based measures capable of capturing low levels of activity, Lee examined the commonly cited benchmark of 10,000 steps per day. In a study of older women, she found that taking approximately 4,000 steps per day was associated with lower mortality rates during follow-up. Mortality rates declined with additional steps but appeared to plateau at around 7,500 steps per day, with no additional observed benefit among women averaging 10,000 steps compared with those averaging 7,500.

The study contributed to both scientific and public discussion by providing empirical evidence on the health associations of lower step counts. Subsequent research has reported similar findings. Lee has argued that physical activity guidelines should acknowledge that relatively small amounts of activity are associated with health benefits, particularly for individuals unable or unlikely to engage in higher levels or intensities of activity.

=== Global burden of inactivity ===
Lee was lead author of a 2012 paper published in The Lancet titled “Effect of physical inactivity on major non-communicable diseases worldwide,” which estimated the global contribution of physical inactivity to mortality and disease burden. The study reported that physical inactivity was associated with a number of deaths globally comparable to those attributed to smoking, highlighting its role as a risk factor for poor health.

== Honours and recognition ==
- Merit Scholarship (Public Service Commission, Singapore), 1979–1984
- Elected Member, American Epidemiological Society, 1995
- Young Epidemiologist Award, Royal Society of Medicine, United Kingdom, 1999
- Elected Fellow, American College of Sports Medicine, 1999
- William G. Anderson Award, American Alliance for Health, Physical Education, Recreation & Dance, 2007
- American College of Sports Medicine Citation Award, 2011
- Clipp-Speer Visiting Professor, Duke University Medical Center, 2014
- Helen LeBaron Hilton Chair, Iowa State University, 2016–2017
- Honorary Doctor of Science, University of Illinois Urbana-Champaign, 2024
