= Ed Galea =

British academic

- Born: Melbourne, Australia
- Education: Monash University
- Known for: Fire safety engineering, evacuation modelling
- Awards: 2001 British Computer Society Gold Medal for IT; 2002 Queen's Anniversary Prize; 2006 and 2017 Royal Aeronautical Society's Gold Award; 2013 RINA Medal of Distinction
- Scientific career
- Fields: Fire and evacuation modelling
- Workplaces: University of Greenwich
- Thesis: (1981)

Edwin Richard Galea is a British academic specialising in fire safety engineering and evacuation dynamics. He is the founding director of the Fire Safety Engineering Group (FSEG) at the University of Greenwich, where he has conducted research in fire modelling, human behaviour in emergencies, and evacuation simulation since 1986.

Galea has served in major public inquiries including the Paddington rail crash, Swissair Flight 111 disaster, Admiral Duncan bombing, and the Grenfell Tower fire. He is also on the editorial boards of Safety Science and The Aeronautical Journal.

== Early life and education ==
Born in Melbourne, Australia, Galea studied physics and mathematics at Monash University. There, he completed a Bachelor of Science in 1980 and a Diploma in Education in 1981. In 1984, he earned his PhD in astrophysics at the University of Newcastle, specialising in magnetohydrodynamics.

== Academic career ==
In 1986, Galea joined Thames Polytechnic (later the University of Greenwich), initially applying computational fluid dynamics (CFD) to study the 1985 Manchester Airport B737 fire. He became Senior Lecturer in 1988, Reader in 1991, and Professor in 1992. That same year, he founded the FSEG, a research unit focused on fire safety and evacuation modelling.

== Research contributions ==
Galea led the development of simulation software such as SMARTFIRE for CFD fire modelling and EXODUS for evacuation modelling. These tools are used to simulate evacuations in aircraft, ships, buildings, and urban environments, contributing to the global safety practices.

== Awards and honours ==
Galea has received several distinctions for his research:

- 2001 British Computer Society Gold Medal for IT (EXODUS development)
- 2002 Queen's Anniversary Prize
- 2006 and 2017 Royal Aeronautical Society Gold Awards (for Swissair Flight 111 and Manchester B737 fire)
- 2013 Royal Institution of Naval Architecture Medal of Distinction (for ship evacuation research)

== Publications and outreach ==
Galea has published over 350 peer-reviewed articles and contributed to documentaries and news media covering fire safety and evacuation.

== Professional involvement ==
Galea is a Chartered Fire Safety Engineer and Chartered Mathematician. He is a Fellow of the Institution of Fire Engineers and the Institute of Mathematics and its Applications.

== Personal life ==
Galea lives in London and has supervised over 35 PhD students. He is married and enjoys photography, astronomy, performance cars, and cinema.
