= Laurence Buckman =

British medical doctor

Laurence Buckman FRCGP (born 19 March 1954) is a British medical doctor who works as a general practitioner (GP). Buckman was chairman of the British Medical Association's General Practitioners' Committee between 2007 and 2013.

He was educated at the University College School in Hampstead, then studied at University College Hospital Medical School. He became a fellow of the Royal College of General Practitioners in 2001. As of 2018, he is the London President of the Jewish Medical Association.
