= Threshold price-point =

In economics, a threshold price point is the psychological fixing of prices to entice a buyer up to a certain threshold at which the buyer will be lost anyway. The most common example in the United States is the $??.99 phenomenon—e.g. setting the price for a good at $9.99. Though it is effectively ten dollars—especially when you add sales tax—it still appears to the potential buyer to be significantly cheaper than if the good was sold $10.00.

Economists and advertising analysts note that should a company need to increase the price of a product beyond the threshold price-point, it should only be done in small amounts. If a candy bar originally cost $1.99, then there is apparently little difference in making the new price $2.05 or even $2.25. The logic behind the move is that while some potential buyers will be lost by the increase in price beyond the threshold, those that stay will not notice the difference in prices between thresholds. Buyers do not make judgement calls on a per-cent basis, so will not differentiate between $2.05 and $2.06. However, they do differentiate at thresholds. So while you wouldn't necessarily lose a buyer jumping from $2.05 and $2.06, you could lose one going from $1.99 to $2.00. Therefore, companies can actually increase overall profit despite losing customers by increasing the revenue per buyer significantly.

== See also ==
- Price point
- Variable import levy
