= Amin (name) =

- Pronunciation: Arabic: [ʔæˈmiːn]
- Gender: Male
- Language: Arabic

Other gender
- Feminine: Amina

Origin
- Origin: Arabic
- Meaning: Truthful

Other names
- Alternative spelling: Amine, Ameen, Amien, ʾAmīn
- Variant form: Emin
- Derived: أ-م-ن (ʾ-m-n) (security)
- Related names: Iman
- Popularity: see popular names

Amin (Arabic: أمين, romanized: ʾāmīn), cognate to amen (Arabic: آمين, āmīn), is an Arabic masculine given name and surname, meaning "devoted, honest, straightforward, trusty, worthy of belief, loyal, faithful, obedient". The name has been loaned into a few other languages, namely ones spoken by Muslim populations. In Persian (امین‌, amīn) it has the same meaning. The Turkish written form of the name is Emin. Other spellings include the Turkic Tatar language Әмин (Ämin / Əmin). In the Balkans, Amin is popular among Bosniaks in the former Yugoslav nations. It is also popular among Albanians. The name is a modification to the name Emin. This region also has a female equivalent to the name: Amina (for example, Amina Kajtaz). Other spellings include Ameen and Amien. Notable people with the name include:

== Amin ==
=== Given name ===
- Amin (politician) (born 1953), Indonesian businessman and politician
- Amin (Qing dynasty) (1585–1640), Manchu noble and political leader
- Amin Abbosh, Iraqi-Australian electrical and biomedical engineer, academic, and scientist
- Amin Hassan Omar Abdullah (born 1951), Sudanese politician
- Amin Liew Abdullah (born 1962), Bruneian businessman and civil servant
- Amin Adamu (born 1997), British basketball player
- Amin Affane (born 1994), Swedish footballer
- Amin Aghaei (born 1982), Iranian painter, sculptor, and cartoonist
- Amin Ahmed (disambiguation), multiple people
- Amin Khan Aitigin, Indian politician
- Amin Alhassan, Ghanaian academic, journalist, and public servant
- Amin Jahan Alian (born 1991), Iranian footballer
- Amin Amer (born 1966), Egyptian swimmer
- Amin Amir (born 1959/60), Somali-Canadian cartoonist and painter
- Amin Asadi (born 1993), Iranian footballer
- Amin Asikainen (born 1976), Finnish boxer
- Amin Askar (born 1985), Ethiopian-Norwegian footballer
- Amin Azzam, American clinical professor
- Amin Bacu (1983–2017), Malaysian ISIS leader
- Amin Baloch (born 1943), Pakistani footballer
- Amin J. Barakat (born 1942), Lebanese-American physician
- Amin Bhatia (born 1961), British-Canadian recording artist, film, and television music score composer and producer
- Amin Bonsu (born 1959), Ghanaian Islamic cleric, scholar, and alternative medicine practitioner
- Amin Boudri (born 2004), Swedish footballer
- Amin Bukhari (born 1997), Saudi Arabian footballer
- Amin Cherni (born 2001), French-Tunisian footballer
- Amin Chiakha (born 2006), Danish-Algerian footballer
- Amin Yop Christopher (born 1993), Nigerian badminton player
- Amin Dakheli (1936–1966), Egyptian gymnast
- Amin Dhillon (born 1985), Canadian on-air host, producer, podcaster, and emcee
- Amin Dora (born 1980), Lebanese film director, visual artist, and professor
- Amin Doudah (born 2002), Belgian footballer
- Amin Durrani, Pakistani-Canadian terrorist
- Amin Erbati (born 1981), Moroccan footballer
- Amin Esmaeilnezhad (born 1996), Iranian volleyball player
- Amin El-Esnawi (1936–2006), Egyptian footballer
- Amin Faghiri (born 1943), Iranian researcher and writer
- Amin Farouk (born 2003), German footballer
- Amin Gazi (born 1988), Indian actor
- Amin Ghaseminejad (born 1986), Iranian footballer
- Amin Ghasemipour, Iranian boxer
- Amin Golestan (born 1988), American-Emirati DJ
- Amin Gulgee (born 1965), Pakistani visual artist and curator
- Amin Abd al-Hadi (1897–1967), Palestinian politician
- Amin El Hady (born 1983), Egyptian judoka
- Amin Hafeez, Pakistani freelance journalist, news reporter, and YouTuber
- Amin al-Hafez (Lebanon) (1926–2009), Lebanese politician
- Amin al-Hafiz (1921–2009), Syrian leader
- Amin Al-Hamawi (born 2003), Iraqi footballer
- Amin al-Haq (born 1960), Afghan terrorist
- Amin ul-Hasanat (1922–1960), Pakistani Islamic religious leader
- Amin Abel Hasbun (1942–1970), Dominican civil engineer, student leader, and political activist
- Amin Abu Hawwas (born 1994), Jordanian-American basketball player
- Amin Hayai (born 1970), Iranian actor
- Amin Hazbavi (born 2003), Iranian footballer
- Amin al-Hindi (1941–2010), Palestinian politician
- Amin Homaei (born 1984), Iranian musician
- Amin Hot (born 1992), Montenegrin basketball player
- Amin Howeidi (1921–2009), Egyptian military officer and politician
- Amin Husain, Palestinian-American activist
- Amin al-Husseini (1897–1974), Palestinian Arab nationalist and Islamic leader
- Amin Yunis al Husseini (1929–2016), Jordanian politician
- Amin Iqbal, Pakistani television/film director and writer
- Amin Iskander (1952–2022), Egyptian politician, writer, and activist
- Amin Ahsan Islahi (1904–1997), Pakistani Muslim scholar
- Amin Mohammad Jamali (born 1977), Iranian photojournalist and sports photographer
- Amin-Salim Jarjora (1886–1975), Israeli Arab politician
- Amin Farhan Jejo, Iraqi Yazidi politician and author
- Amin Jensen (born 1970), Danish actor and comedian
- Amin Joseph (born 1980), American actor, director, and producer
- Amin Kamil (1924–2014), Kashmiri poet, literary critic, researcher, and editor
- Amin Karim (born 1959), French-Afghan politician
- Amin Kavianinejad (born 1998), Iranian Greco-Roman wrestler
- Amin Kazemi (born 1988), Iranian handball player
- Amin Abu Khalifa (born 2006), Jordanian footballer
- Amin Khan (actor) (born 1972), Bangladeshi actor
- Amin Ullah Khan (born 1971), Pakistani businessman and politician
- Amin Khatibi (born 1997), Iranian footballer
- Amin Khoury, American businessman
- Amin al-Khuli (1895–1966), Egyptian academic, Quran scholar, and writer
- Amin Jahan Kohan (born 1993), Iranian footballer
- Amin Lakhani (born 1959), Pakistani cricketer
- Amin Maalouf (born 1949), Lebanese author
- Amin Madani (1911–1984), Saudi historian, writer, journalist, and researcher
- Amin Mahmoud (politician) (born 1940), Jordanian politician, educator, and author
- Amin al-Majaj (1921–1999), Palestinian politician
- Amin Manouchehri (born 1986), Iranian footballer
- Amin Mao (born 1962), Chinese singer
- Amin Massoudi (born 1988), Canadian political staffer
- Amin Mekki Medani (1939–2018), Sudanese human rights lawyer and political activist
- Amin Mirzazadeh (born 1998), Iranian Greco-Roman wrestler
- Amin Motevaselzadeh (born 1982), Iranian footballer
- Amin Nabizada (born 2007), British footballer
- Amin Nakhla (1901–1976), Lebanese lawyer, editor, poet, and writer
- Amin Nasir (1968–2017), Singaporean footballer
- Amin H. Nasser (born 1960), Saudi businessman
- Amin Nazari (born 1993), Filipino footballer
- Amin Niffouri (born 1971), Uruguayan politician
- Amin Nikfar (born 1981), Iranian-American shot putter
- Amin Niyazov (1903–1973), Soviet and Uzbek politician
- Amin Nouri (born 1990), Norwegian footballer
- Amin Omar (born 1985), Egyptian football referee
- Amin Osman (1898–1946), Egyptian politician
- Amin Patel (born 1963), Indian politician
- Amin Pourali (born 1988), Iranian footballer
- Amin Hossein Rahimi (born 1968), Iranian politician
- Amin Abdel Rahman (1941–2011), Egyptian water polo player
- Amin Ramadan (born 1981), Egyptian rower
- Amin Ramazanov (born 2003), Russian-Azerbaijani footballer
- Amin Abu Rashid (born 1966/67), Palestinian-Dutch activist
- Amin-ur-Rehman (born 1983), Pakistani cricketer
- Amin al-Rihani (1876–1940), Lebanese author
- Amin Said (1891–1967), Syrian historian and journalist
- Amin Saikal (born 1950), Afghan-Australian academic and professor
- Amin Salam (born 1979), Lebanese international corporate lawyer, economist, and politician
- Amin Saleh (born 1950), Bahraini author, scriptwriter, poet, journalist, and translator
- Amin Al-Sanini (born 1965), Yemeni footballer
- Amin Sarr (born 2001), Swedish footballer
- Amin Saryana (born 1977), Indonesian racing cyclist
- Amin Seydiyev (born 1998), Azerbaijani footballer
- Amin Shah (born 1979), Indian politician
- Amin al-Shami (died 2011), Yemeni Air Force colonel
- Amin Al-Shanaineh (born 2003), Jordanian footballer
- Amin Shaykho (born 1998), Syrian-American businessman, speaker, and social media influencer
- Amin Sherri, Lebanese Shia politician
- Amin Shojaeian (born 1988), Iranian footballer
- Amin Shokrollahi (born 1964), German-Iranian mathematician
- Amin Shouman (born 1954), Egyptian basketball player
- Amin Sidi-Boumédiène (born 1982), French–Algerian filmmaker
- Amin Sisa (born 1998), Bruneian footballer
- Amin Stevens (born 1990), American basketball player
- Amin Suhrawardy (1859–1894), Bengali judge, academic, and sorcerer
- Amin Amidu Sulemana (born 1955), Ghanaian diplomat and politician
- Amin Sweeney (1938–2010), Malay linguist of Anglo-Irish descent
- Amin Syam (1945–2023), Indonesian military officer and politician
- Amin Syarifudin (born 1982), Indonesian footballer
- Amin Tabatabaei (born 2001), Iranian chess grandmaster
- Amin Taghizadeh (born 1994), Iranian footballer
- Amin Taheri (born 1995), Iranian freestyle wrestler
- Amin Tarif (1898–1993), Israeli Druze leader
- Amin Tarokh (1953–2022), Iranian actor
- Amin Tarzi, Afghan-American journalist and academic
- Amin Tighazoui (born 1989), French footballer
- Amin Tojiyev (1947–2026), Uzbek politician
- Amin Torkashvand (born 1982), Iranian footballer
- Amin Vahdat, American computer scientist and business executive
- Amin al-Waeli (1962–2021), Yemeni military officer
- Amin Wahbi (born 1952), Lebanese Shia politician and cardiologist
- Amin Walji, Kenyan-Indian politician
- Amin Wardak (born 1951), Afghan mujahideen leader
- Amin ur Rashid Yasin (born 1958), Bangladeshi politician, businessman, and exporter
- Amin Younes (born 1993), German footballer
- Amin Yousefi (born 1996), Iranian image-based artist and researcher
- Amin Yousefinezhad (born 1996), Iranian handball player
- Amin Zahir (born 1970), British fencer
- Amin Zahzouh (born 2000), Moroccan footballer
- Amin Zaki (1941–2019), Sudanese footballer
- Amin Zaoui (born 1956), Algerian novelist
- Amin Zendegani (born 1972), Iranian actor
- Amin Saad Muhammad al-Zumari (born 1968), Yemeni criminal

=== Middle name ===
- Faisal Amin Abu-Rass (born 1957), Yemeni diplomat and politician
- Mohamed Amin Didi (1910–1954), president of the Maldives from 1953 to 1954
- Mohammad Amin al-Husayni (1897–1974), Mufti of Jerusalem
- Muhammad Amien Rais, Indonesian politician
- Sadeq Amin Abu Rass (born 1952), Yemeni politician
- Sami Amin Al-Arian (born 1958), Palestinian political activist convicted of aiding a terrorist organization

=== Surname ===
- Adam Amin (born 1986), American sportscaster
- Ahmad Amin (1954–1886), Egyptian historian and writer
- Ash Amin (born 1955), British geographer
- Ehab Amin (born 1995), Egyptian basketball player
- Esperidião Amin (born 1947), Brazilian politician
- Hafizullah Amin (1929–1979), 2nd General Secretary of the People's Democratic Party of Afghanistan
- Hájí Amín (1831–1928), one of the 19 Apostles of Bahá'u'lláh, of the Bahá'í Faith
- Haron Amin (1969–2015), Afghan diplomat
- Hassan Amin, several people
- Idi Amin (1928–2003), President of Uganda from 1971 to 1979
- Jabar Amin (born 1959), Swedish politician
- Khadija Amin, Bangladesh Nationalist Party politician and Member of Parliament
- Ma'ruf Amin, (born 1943), vice president of Indonesia from 2019 to 2024
- Massoud Amin (born 1961), American professor
- Mohamed Amin (1943–1996) (also known as 'Mo'), Kenyan photojournalist and entrepreneur
- Musa Nur Amin, Somali politician
- Riaz Amin (born 1998), English professional martial artist
- Samir Amin (1931–2018), Egyptian French economist and political scientist

== Amine ==
=== Mononym ===
- Amine (French singer) (born 1984), Moroccan-born French R&B singer, full name Amine Mounder

=== Given name ===
- Amine Aboulfath (born 1997), Moroccan footballer
- Amine Adli (born 2000), French footballer
- Amine Ahouda (born 1997), Moroccan tennis player
- Amine Aksas (born 1983), Algerian football player
- Amine Amamou (born 1987), Moroccan football player
- Amine Amiri (born 1994), Moroccan snooker player
- Amine Mabel Andresen (born 1976), Norwegian politician
- Amine Aoudia (born 1987), Algerian footballer
- Amine Aouichaoui (born 1982), Tunisian footballer
- Amine Atouchi (born 1992), Moroccan footballer
- Amine Bannour (born 1990), Tunisian handball player
- Amine Bassi (born 1997), French-Moroccan footballer
- Amine Belaïd (born 1988), Algerian football player
- Amine Belferar (born 1991), Algerian middle-distance runner
- Amine Benaddi (born 1993), Moroccan-Bahraini footballer
- Amine Benchaib (born 1998), Belgian footballer
- Amine Benfriha (born 2005), Belgian footballer
- Amine Bensaid (born 1968), Moroccan computer scientist and academic
- Amine Bermak, French academic
- Amine Bouanani (born 1997), Algerian track and field athlete
- Amine Bouhijbha (born 1996), Tunisian weightlifter
- Amine Boukhlouf (born 1984), Algerian football player
- Amine Boushaki (born 1982), Algerian judoka
- Amine Boutrah (born 2000), French footballer
- Amine Chabane (born 2003), French footballer
- Amine Chermiti (born 1987), Tunisian football player
- Amine Dinar (born 1995), Moroccan footballer
- Amine Echiguer (born 1988), Moroccan rally raid racer
- Amine Ennali (born 1997), Moroccan footballer
- Amine Farhane (born 1998), Moroccan footballer
- Amine Pierre Gemayel (born 1942), Lebanese politician
- Amine Ghazoini (born 2001), Italian-Moroccan footballer
- Amine Al Ghozzi (born 1980), Tunisian-French writer
- Amine Gouiri (born 2000), French footballer
- Amine Guennichi (born 1999), Tunisian Greco-Roman wrestler
- Amine Haboubi (born 2002), Tunisian footballer
- Amine Hamia (born 1989), Algerian footballer
- Amine Harit (born 1997), Moroccan footballer
- Amine Hemia (born 1998), French footballer
- Amine Hiver (born 1998), Chadian footballer
- Amine Kamoun (born 1982), Tunisian footballer
- Amine Karam (born 1984), French footballer
- Amine Kessaci (born 2003), French activist
- Amine Khadiri (born 1988), Moroccan-born Cypriot middle-distance runner
- Amine El Khalifi (born 1983), Moroccan convicted terrorist
- Amine Khammas (born 1999), Belgian footballer
- Amine Khazen (born 1941), Lebanese diplomat
- Amine Laâlou (born 1982), Moroccan middle-distance runner
- Amine Lecomte (born 1990), French-Moroccan football player
- Amine Linganzi (born 1989), Congolese football player
- Amine Ltaïef (born 1984), Tunisian football player
- Amine Ltifi (born 1984), Tunisian footballer
- Amine El Manaoui (born 1991), Moroccan middle-distance runner
- Amine Mazouzi (born 1965), Algerian engineer
- Amine Megateli (born 1987), Algerian footballer
- Amine Messoussa (born 2004), French footballer
- Amine Mezbar (also known as Adel Tobbicchi), Canadian convicted terrorist
- Amine M'raihi, part of the Tunisian oud/qanun musical duo Amine and Hamza
- Amine Naïfi (born 1999), French footballer
- Amine Noua (born 1997), French basketball player
- Amine El Ouazzani (born 2001), French-Moroccan footballer
- Amine Oudrhiri (born 1992), French footballer
- Amine Gülşe Özil (born 1993), Turkish-Swedish model
- Amine Rzig (born 1980), Tunisian basketball player
- Amine Salama (born 2000), French footballer
- Amine Sbaï (born 2000), Moroccan footballer
- Amine Souane (born 2001), Moroccan footballer
- Amine Et-Taïbi (born 2003), Belgian-Moroccan footballer
- Amine Takieddine (1884–1937), Lebanese writer, poet, lawyer, and political journalist
- Amine Talal (born 1996), Moroccan footballer
- Amine Touahri (born 1989), Algerian footballer

=== Middle name ===
- Mohamed Amine Aoudia (born 1987), Algerian football player
- Mohammed Amine El Bourkadi (born 1985), Moroccan football player
- Mohamed Amine Khamsi (born 1959), Moroccan mathematician
- Mohamed Amine Najmi (born 1981), Moroccan football player
- Mohamed Amine Ouadahi (born 1987), Algerian boxer
- Mohamed Amine Sbihi (born 1954), Moroccan politician
- Mohammed Amine Smaili (died 2025), Moroccan interfaith theologian
- Mohamed El-Amine Souef (born 1962), Comorian diplomat and government minister
- Pierre Amine Gemayel (1972–2006), Lebanese politician, MP and government minister
- Youssouf Amine Elalamy (born 1961), Moroccan writer

=== Surname ===
- Hussein Amine (born 1985), Lebanese football player
- Khalil Amine (born 1962), Moroccan scientist
- Myles Amine (born 1996), Sammarinese American freestyle wrestler
- Nazem Amine (1927–2017), Lebanese wrestler

== Compound names with Amin ==
- Aminul Haque (disambiguation), multiple people
- Nurul Amin (disambiguation), multiple people
- Ruhul Amin (disambiguation), multiple people

== See also ==
- Amin (disambiguation)
- Al-Amin (name)
- Amini (surname)
- Amin al-Dawla (disambiguation), an honorific title
- Iman (Islam)
