= International reactions to the killing of Muammar Gaddafi =

The international reactions to the killing of Muammar Gaddafi concern the responses of foreign governments and supranational organisations to the killing of former Libyan leader Muammar Gaddafi at the Battle of Sirte, the last major engagement of the 2011 Libyan civil war, on 20 October 2011.

== International role in Gaddafi's downfall ==
The United Nations Security Council voted to authorize a Libyan no-fly zone. Two days later, the French Air Force struck an armoured division and artillery pieces arrayed outside Benghazi, the de facto capital of the interim rebel governing authority, beginning international military operations in the Libyan theatre.

NATO forces involved in Operation Unified Protector, the codename for the military intervention in Libya, participated in the Battle of Sirte in which Gaddafi was captured and killed. French and U.S. aircraft struck the convoy in which Gaddafi was traveling, leaving him wounded and forcing him to abandon his attempted flight from the besieged city. In an official statement, NATO claimed it was unaware that Gaddafi was part of the convoy.

== Reactions ==
=== National representatives ===
==== Africa ====
- Côte d'Ivoire – Minister of State, Foreign Minister Daniel Kablan Duncan said that Côte d'Ivoire was "for dialogue and peace in Libya. But with regard to the death of Colonel Gaddafi must wait until all items before deciding".
- Ethiopia – The spokesperson of the Ministry of Foreign Affairs said: "Gaddafi has not been part of the solution for Libyan crisis. So his death was the only option for the Libyan people. It’s the Libyan people who already overthrew him, so Ethiopian government respects the move and demand of the Libyan people".
- Ghana – Former president John Agyekum Kufuor said that "Gaddafi’s death is a historic sad day in Africa" and "showed that oppressed people would surely rise one day to demand accountability from their leaders."
- Kenya – Prime Minister Raila Odinga commented on the end of the "reign and life of one of Africa's most flamboyant leaders and one of AU's biggest financiers in a hail of bullets" and criticized African Union for its "inaction and its solidarity with African leaders in the face of excesses committed against own people".
- Namibia – The Minister of Foreign Affairs Utoni Nujoma said that "we have witnessed was an extra-judicial killing of Gaddafi by the NTC [National Transitional Council] under the command of Nato." Also the ex-president of Namibia Sam Nujoma said that "foreign-sponsored killing of Libya’s Muammar Gaddafi must serve as a lesson to Africa that foreign aggressors are readying themselves to pounce on the continent."
- Nigeria – Statement of the Ministry of Foreign Affairs said: "Nigeria has taken cognisance of the death of Gaddafi. This happening vindicates our foresight and vision in taking the step to recognise the fledging NTC then."
- South Africa – President Jacob Zuma condemned the death of Gaddafi, he said "Given there was a warrant of arrest against Gaddafi, those who found him should have arrested him and handed him to the ICC, We expected him to be captured, given that everybody knew there was a warrant of arrest issued against him. There is a trend across the world where former leaders accused of injustice are not given an opportunity to stand trial in a court of justice. That is surprising. I think even those who accused him [Gaddafi] would have wanted to see him become answerable." The South African Department of International Relations and Cooperation said in a statement that it took notice of the death of Gaddafi and stated the South African government's view that "a lasting and sustainable peaceful solution is possible through an all inclusive political process that will culminate in the holding of the first ever democratic elections". According to the statement, the government hoped that "the latest events will lead to a cessation of hostilities and the restoration of peace."
- Sudan – Minister of State Amin Hassan Omar Abdullah said that "his (Gaddafi's) tragic death was expected and Sudan would be spared many problems."
- Swaziland – Many senators made condolences and agreed that country authorities should make condolences too. Some sources published informations that Swaziland's monarch, Mswati III, was upset hearing about the death of Muammar Gaddafi, his close friend.
- Tanzania – Foreign Minister Bernard Membe said that it is not Tanzanian culture to celebrate any death even of its enemies; and that Tanzania was 'shocked and saddened' by the manner of Gaddafi's death. "Although he is dead, our stance remains the same – that the fighting in Libya was wrong in the first place, and that it is going to be a big challenge to bring that country together."
- Uganda – President Yoweri Museveni described the death as a "cowardly act by the National Transitional Council (NTC) leaders".
- Zimbabwe – Cairo Mhandu, a member of the Zimbabwean Parliament with President Robert Mugabe's ruling Zimbabwe African National Union – Patriotic Front (ZANU-PF) party, expressed grief over Gaddafi's death. "This is a sad day for the people of Africa... Muammar Gaddafi won elections and was a true leader. It is foreigners who toppled him, not Libyans. Gaddafi died fighting. He is a true African hero." Mhandu called the former leader's downfall "the beginning of a new recolonisation of Africa".

==== Asia ====
- China – Foreign Ministry spokeswoman Jiang Yu, in a statement issued on the ministry's website, said that "At the moment, Libya's history has turned a new page" and expressed hope that the transition to an inclusive political process will start as soon as possible, (so as to) safeguard ethnic unity and national unity, restore social stability as soon as possible and rebuild the economy, so that citizens can lead happy and peaceful lives.
- India – While India refrained from reacting officially to the death of Muammar Gaddafi, a joint statement issued after his death by India's External Affairs minister S. M. Krishna and his French counterpart, Alain Juppé, in New Delhi, declared that the two countries support the efforts of the National Transition Council representing the Libyan people as a whole, to establish democratic institutions in a free Libya, to promote human rights, and to rebuild their country after the sufferings they have endured.
- Iran – Foreign Minister Ali Akbar Salehi said this divine promise and the fate of all dictators and tyrants in history and congratulated the Libyan people and National Transitional Council officials and said that Iran is ready to help to build a "new and democratic Libya". Conversely, President Mahmoud Ahmadinejad condemned the death of Muammar Gaddafi and said the nation will prevail everywhere must believe that justice, freedom and respect for the right of all nations, but of people killed or anyone not happy and I wish all to justice and respect for the rights of their nations. Ahmadinejad has raised the question why Gadhafi killed without trial? an answer to the question. Mahmoud Ahmadinejad said the trial would be to determine who has given money to the Libyan people. It was unclear what contracts have been closed and also said Western countries supported Muammar Gaddafi when it suited them but bombed the Libyan leader when he no longer served their purpose in order to "plunder" the North African country's oil wealth.
- Iraq – Prime Minister Nouri al-Maliki hailed the killing of Gaddafi, saying, "We congratulate our Libyan brothers and the [National] Transitional Council on the occasion of getting rid of the tyrant Gaddafi, who ran Libya for four decades filled with oppression." Maliki compared Gaddafi's death to that of Saddam Hussein, found in similar conditions during the Iraq War eight years earlier. "The similarity of the fate of tyrants in Iraq and Libya and elsewhere is proof of the potential of the people to defeat dictators, however long they have been in power," Maliki said.
- Israel – Undisclosed senior government officials were quoted as saying that "there is no reason for Israel to be sorry over the loss of Gaddafi" as Muammar Gaddafi "supported terror and advocated terror against Israelis all over the world".
- Kuwait – Minister of State for Cabinet Affairs, Acting Foreign Minister and the official spokesman of the Government, Ali Al-Rashed, expressed, in a statement, hope that the end of Gaddafi's regime would constitute start of a new chapter in the history of the Libyan people for realizing their aspirations for security, stability and prosperity. The government spokesman called on the Libyans to unite and back the Transitional Council in its efforts for establishing a new ruling system, based on justice, equality and respect for legitimate rights of the people. He affirmed Kuwait's support for the Libyan people.
- Lebanon – Speaker of the Lebanese Parliament Nabih Berri made no clear statement, mentioning indirectly perhaps Gaddafi when he stated that "God's justice will come, sooner or later" but the statement did not indicate whether he was speaking of Gaddafi. Former Prime Minister Saad Hariri also welcomed the demise of Gaddafi stating "The end of Muammar Gaddafi is the inevitable end of all tyrants who are facing their people's will for freedom and democracy with killing, repression and blood."
- Oman – On 27 October the Sultanate of Oman offered the Gaddafi family asylum.
- Pakistan – The politician Imran Khan called the death of Gaddafi an "injustice" and a "double standard" by the U.S.
- Philippines – The Department of Foreign Relations congratulated the Libyan people for "their latest victory and the total liberation of Libya."
- (Ba'athist Syria) Syria – President of Syria Bashar al-Assad condemned the killing of Gaddafi as a crime he said "Describing what happened to Al Gaddafi, this is savage, this is crime. Whatever he did, whatever he was, nobody in the world can accept what happened, to kill somebody like this."
- Sri Lanka – Ministry of External Affairs of Sri Lanka issued the statement "The Government of Sri Lanka is of the opinion that the circumstances surrounding the death of Colonel Muammar Gaddafi require an explanation" - calling for probe in case of Gaddafi's death.
- Turkey – Prime Minister Recep Tayyip Erdoğan said, "I was saddened by Gaddafi's fate being the way it was". Foreign Minister Ahmet Davutoglu said, "The fate of Gaddafi and his regime constitutes a bitter lesson that should be reviewed carefully regarding the movements of change and transformation in the region".
- Yemen – Abdul Janadi, deputy information minister and government's spokesman, told Xinhua news agency on Friday that the Yemeni government should not be busy with the death of Gaddafi at a time when it was trying to lift the country out of the current crisis.

==== Europe ====
- Albania – President Bamir Topi and Prime Minister Sali Berisha described Gaddafi's death as a beneficial event for the people of Libya that would mean the end of that country's conflict, although they would have preferred that he was captured alive and made to stand trial.
- Austria – Foreign Minister Michael Spindelegger said that he was relieved because the bloodshed would now come to an end.
- Belarus – President Alexander Lukashenko said "Aggression has been committed, and the country's leadership, not only Muammar Gaddafi, has been killed. And how was it killed? Well, if they had shot him in a battle, it's one thing, but they humiliated and tormented him, they shot at him, they violated him when he was wounded, they twisted his neck and arms, and then they tortured him to death. It's worse than the Nazis once did." And he added that "Everything will be even worse in Libya, because it has colossal deposits of resources, and everyone has rushed there to grab those riches."
- Bulgaria – Foreign Minister Nickolay Mladenov said that Gaddafi's death marks the beginning of a new era in Libya with her future in the hands of the Libyan people.
- Czech Republic – Prime Minister Petr Nečas told that the "death of toppled former long-standing Libyan leader Muammar Gaddafi proves that the crimes dictators commit in relation to their own nations do not go unpunished". Also the Ministry of Foreign Affairs expressed its "hope that by the death of Muammar Gaddafi the bloodshed in Libya is now finally coming to an end".
- Denmark – Prime Minister Helle Thorning-Schmidt said that it is a historic day in the Libyan people's struggle for freedom and democracy. She fully understands the happiness of the Libyan people, and says that Denmark is ready to support the Libyan people.
- France – President Nicolas Sarkozy called Gaddafi's death a milestone in the Libyan people's battle "to free themselves from the dictatorial and violent regime that was imposed on them for more than 40 years."
- Germany – Chancellor Angela Merkel said that this is an important day for Libya and a new peaceful beginning is possible. "With this, a bloody war comes to an end, which Gaddafi led against his own people. Libya must now quickly take further resolute steps towards democracy and make the achievements so far of the Arab Spring irreversible."
- Holy See – A statement was released by the Holy See Press Office, saying that Gaddafi's death "closes an overly long and tragic phase of the bloody fight for the overthrow of a hard and oppressive regime." It continues that it shows "the immense human suffering that accompanies the affirmation and the collapse of every system that is not based on the respect and dignity of the person, but on the prevailing assertion of power."
- Hungary – Foreign Minister János Martonyi said that Gaddafi's death means the end of decades of tyranny and opens a new chapter in the history of Libya. He also stated that Hungary was ready to play a key role in contributing to the creation of a democratic Libya.
- Italy – Prime Minister Silvio Berlusconi reacted to reports of Gaddafi's death by saying "Sic transit gloria mundi" (thus passes the glory of the world) and that now "the war is over."
- Malta – Prime Minister Lawrence Gonzi reacted to reports of Gaddafi's death by saying that, "Gaddafi's death marks a new beginning for Libya" and that "The Maltese will help according to our capabilities".
- Netherlands – Prime Minister of the Netherlands Mark Rutte said the people of Libya had opened themselves up to great personal danger by rebelling against Gaddafi's rule. "We would have rather saw that he had been called to account for his crimes in The Hague. In any case, let us hope the others who are being sought can be brought before the international criminal court."
- Norway – Prime Minister Jens Stoltenberg reacted to reports of Gaddafi's death by saying that, "this is a turning point for Libya" and that "Now it is all about making a democratic Libya. Although Gaddafi's death is not a guarantee for that, it is a good basis".
- Poland – In an announcement, the Polish Foreign Ministry expressed hope of upcoming peace and democracy in Libya and that "We regret that the falling dictator, to defend his power, plunged the country into a civil war, in which tens of thousands of Libyans died."
- Russia – Special envoy Mikhail Margelov warned that the war could continue in spite of Gaddafi's death. Foreign Minister Sergei Lavrov said the killing of Gaddafi violated the Geneva Conventions prohibiting summary execution of prisoners of war. Then-prime minister Vladimir Putin expressed his "disgust" at images being shown of Gaddafi's killing and later accused the United States of involvement in the matter. Igor Barinov, the vice-chairman of the State Duma Committee on Defense stated that methods of dealing with Gaddafi and the subsequent reaction of western leaders reminds of the darkest episodes of Middle Ages than contemporary operations of democracy development.
- Spain – Foreign Minister Trinidad Jiménez has appealed for reconciliation and offered Spain's assistance in the forthcoming peace process in Libya. She also called for those responsible for crimes to be made accountable.
- United Kingdom – British Prime Minister David Cameron said "we should also remember the many, many Libyans who died at the hands of this brutal dictator and his regime" and that "people in Libya today have an even greater chance, after this news, of building themselves a strong and democratic future." Foreign Secretary William Hague expressed regret that Gaddafi was killed before he could be brought to trial. Defence Secretary Philip Hammond said that Gaddafi's death left the reputation of the NTC "a little bit stained", adding, "It's certainly not the way we do things. We would have liked to see Gaddafi going on trial to answer for his misdeeds."

==== North America ====
- Canada – Prime Minister Stephen Harper heralded the day's developments, saying Gaddafi will "never again be in a position to support terrorism or to allow others to fire on his own citizens." "The people of Libya can finally turn the page after 42 years of a chapter of terrible oppression, and it can now seek a better future," he said from the foyer of the House of Commons."
- Costa Rica – The Ministry of Foreign Affairs expressed "hope that the death of former Libyan leader, Muammar Gaddafi, allow the reconciliation of that African nation."
- Cuba – On 23 October Fidel Castro condemned the assassination of Muammar Gaddafi, and the "genocidal role" of NATO. He added also that "Gaddafi's body has been kidnapped and displayed as a trophy of war, a conduct that violates the most elementary principles of Islamic rules and other religious beliefs prevailing in the world."
- Dominica – Prime Minister Roosevelt Skerrit on 23 September said "Like any civilised society we will never condone the manner in which a person is killed. We will never tolerate it, irrespective of who the person is, or what the person may have done, or alleged to have done. Extrajudicial killings should never be supported or promoted by any civilised nation."
- Grenada – Prime Minister Tillman Thomas referred to Gaddafi's death as "unfortunate".
- Mexico – The Foreign Ministry said in a statement that "in light of the events today in Libya and the death of Colonel Muammar Gaddafi, Mexico hopes to soon restore peace in that country, begin a process of national reconciliation and generate the conditions to build an inclusive government."
- Nicaragua – President Daniel Ortega condemned the death of Muammar Gaddafi. Foreign Minister Miguel d'Escoto Brockmann lamented the killing and slammed the U.S. by saying, "This is all part of the same imperial aggression that we see against Iraq and Afghanistan. It’s a very sad time in which we’re living."
- Panama – The Foreign Ministry through a statement said that the death of Muammar Gaddafi opens a "new era of dignity and democracy" in Libya and hoped that National Transitional Council will create a government - "product of elections free and fair."
- Saint Lucia – Foreign Minister Rufus Bousquet said that Gaddafi will be missed because of his "using his money for investment in Africa in the development of the African world and the Caribbean."
- United States – During a press conference, President Barack Obama said that "the shadow of tyranny over Libya has been lifted", but also added "we're under no delusions; Libya has a long and winding road ahead of it towards democracy." Secretary of State Hillary Clinton upon initially hearing of the death laughed and jubilantly stated "we came, we saw, he died" while appearing in a televised interview, later saying her government would have preferred to see Gaddafi tried and called for a joint UN–Libyan investigation into how he died in custody.

==== Oceania ====
- Australia – Prime Minister Julia Gillard said the fall of Sirte and the death of Gaddafi marked "a day of relief in Libya as the long war of liberation comes to an end". She expressed Australian support for Libya's NTC in the transitional phase. She said she was ready to help Libya's new leaders work towards peace and stability in the wake of the former leader's death. Foreign Minister Kevin Rudd called for the events to mark an end to violence in Libya.

==== South America ====
- Brazil – President Dilma Rousseff said "I think Libya is going through a process of democratic transformation. However, that does not mean we should celebrate the death of a leader. The fact that Libya is going through a democratic process ought not be 'celebrated', but rather supported and given incentive and, in fact, what we want is that [all] countries have the capacity, internally, to live in peace and with democracy."
- Chile – Minister of Foreign Affairs Alfredo Moreno Charme said that Gaddafi's death "creates an opportunity for peace" and progress in Libya. He added: "He had requested an arrest warrant, and it would have been better if he had been before the courts, but these are the things that happen when there is war".
- Colombia – President Juan Manuel Santos stated in a declaration from the Palace of Nariño that "With the death of Gaddafi, we hope Libya can return to normal as soon as possible, that democracy and freedom can finally prevail." The mandatary also trusted that "the Libyans are responsible for their own future and that they become aware of their own country and that they can prosper in peace."
- Ecuador – President Rafael Correa called Gaddafi's death "murder" and said he was "executed". Correa demanded that the UN investigate Gaddafi's death as well as the death of Mutassim Gaddafi and the earlier deaths of Saif al-Arab Gaddafi and two of Gaddafi's grandchildren in Tripoli.
- Uruguay – President Jose Mujica said that Gaddafi's death "seems that nation have no right to self-determination."
- Venezuela – President Hugo Chávez told the AFP, "We will remember Gaddafi our whole lives as a great fighter, a revolutionary and a martyr. They assassinated him. It is another outrage."

=== Intergovernmental organizations ===
==== Regional communities ====
- African Union – African Union officials said that it had lifted the suspension of Libya's membership and it would allow the NTC to fill the Libyan seat in the Union.
- Arab League – Arab League Secretary-General Nabil al-Arabi said that he hoped the death of ousted Libyan leader Muammar Gaddafi and all the other Arab leaders would "turn the page of tyranny."
- Caribbean Community – CARICOM Chairman Denzil L. Douglas said Gaddafi's death "marks the end of a painful and tumultuous chapter for the people of Libya who have endured a protracted conflict in that country over the past eight months". He called for the NTC, NATO, and the UN Security Council to oversee the establishment of a lasting peace and a democratic civil state. Douglas also expressed concern over "the widespread reports of violations of human rights against former members of the Libyan government and minority groups, including migrants from Sub-Saharan countries" on behalf of CARICOM.
- European Union – President of the European Council Herman Van Rompuy said, "The death of Gaddafi marks the end of an era of despotism. That Gaddafi died in a raid in Sirte means an end also to the repression from which the Libyan people have suffered for too long."

==== NATO ====
The top officer of the North Atlantic Treaty Organization, Admiral James G. Stavridis, Supreme Allied Commander Europe, announced that he will recommend that the alliance's Libya air campaign be brought to an end. Officials have said the alliance would likely continue its air patrols over Libya for several more days and then be gradually phased out.

NATO Secretary-General Anders Fogh Rasmussen said in a statement that "NATO and our partners have successfully implemented the historic mandate of the United Nations to protect the people of Libya. We will terminate our mission in coordination with the United Nations and the National Transitional Council. With the reported fall of Bani Walid and Sirte, that moment has now moved much closer." The North Atlantic Council, the governing body of NATO, will meet on 21 October to officially terminate the seven-month campaign.

NATO defense ministers, meeting in Brussels earlier in October, decided not to halt air operations. However, following Gaddafi's death and the NTC's taking of Sirt, the last city under Gaddafi's control, NATO is likely to officially end the campaign. And the inter-governmental military alliance is now expected to bring the campaign to an end. While only suspending airstrikes and beginning a monitoring period was considered, a NATO officer speaking to the Los Angeles Times on condition of anonymity stated that the sentiment within NATO is to end the campaign entirely, including the enforcement of the no-fly zone and the arms embargo enforced by naval ships.

The death of Gaddafi and the end of the campaign were viewed as a "rare clear-cut victory" for NATO after long operations in Afghanistan and anti-piracy patrols off Somalia. According to Michael Clarke, director of the London-based Royal United Services Institute think tank, "NATO can say unambiguously this was a military and political success. That's why today is a good day for NATO, and NATO has not had many good days in the last several years."

NATO announced that its mission in Libya would end on 31 October 2011.

==== United Nations ====
UN Secretary-General Ban Ki-moon stated that "This day marks a historic transition for Libya. In the coming days, we will witness scenes of celebration as well as grief for those who lost so much. Now is the time for all Libyans to come together. Libyans can only realise the promise of the future for national unity and reconciliation. Combatants on all sides must lay down their arms in peace. This is the time for healing and rebuilding, for generosity of spirit, not for revenge."

Rupert Colville, spokesperson for the UN High Commissioner for Human Rights, said in a briefing: "As you are aware, there are at least two cell-phone videos, one showing him alive and one showing him dead. Taken together, these videos are very disturbing. We believe there is a need for an investigation and more details are needed to ascertain whether he was killed in the fighting or after his capture". Christof Heyns, the United Nations Special Rapporteur on extrajudicial, summary or arbitrary executions, called for an international investigation into Gaddafi's death, stating that his killing may have been a war crime.

=== Non-governmental organizations ===
- Amnesty International – The London-based human rights group immediately called for "a full, independent and impartial inquiry" into Gaddafi's death and said other former regime members and fighters should be treated "humanely".
- Human Rights Watch – The group reviewed documentary materials of Gaddafi's capture and corpse and concluded that he and others "might have been executed after being detained". The organisation called for an investigation, with official Sarah Leah Whitson saying, "Finding out how they died matters."

== Regional ramifications ==
In its immediate aftermath, the killing of Gaddafi was thought to have significant implications in North Africa and the Middle East, as a critical event in the Arab Spring. Pundits speculated that it would intensify protests in Syria and Yemen, with French officials also stating that they were "watching the Algerian situation" for potential ramifications from Gaddafi's death.

== See also ==
- International reactions to the Libyan civil war
- International reactions to the 2011 military intervention in Libya
