= Homai, Iran =

Homai (Persian: همائي) in Iran may refer to:

== Geography ==
- Homai, Razavi Khorasan: a village in Khorasan Province, Iran

== People ==
- Jalaluddin Humai or Homaei, 20th-century Iranian scholar (died 1980)
- Amin Homaei or Homai, Iranian musician (born 1984)
