= Amin Ahmed =

Amin Ahmed may refer to:

== People ==
- Amin Ahmed (jurist, born 1899) (1899–1991), Pakistani jurist, chief justice of the Dacca High Court
- Qazi Muhammad Amin Ahmed (1957–2023), Pakistani jurist, judge of the Supreme Court of Pakistan
- Amin Ahmed Chowdhury (1946–2013), Bangladeshi army officer and diplomat
- Amin Ahmed Adel Youssef (born 1947), Egyptian swimmer
