= Amine Mezbar =

Amine Mezbar (also known as Adel Tobbicchi)) is a Canadian citizen who was arrested and wrongfully charged with terrorism, following an alleged plot conspiring to blow up the American embassy in Paris in June 2002. He was later found not guilty of the charge in a Dutch court.

== Life ==
Mezbar is alleged to have stolen several passports in 1997 and 1999 after his fingerprints were found on the scene. He lived in a Rotterdam apartment with Jerome Courtailler and Mohammed Berkous, although the latter was arrested two days after the September 11 attacks.

Mezbar came to Canada under the name "Adel Tobbichi", and earned permanent resident status in April 2000. He lived primarily in Montreal, where he was allegedly forging passports and similar documentation to help militants cross European borders.

== Arrest ==
In July 2002 he was arrested and extradited to face charges in the Netherlands. He did not challenge his extradition, noting he had more faith in a European justice system than a Canadian one, as he had grown "disillusioned" after Canadian officials repeatedly interrogated him and accused him of terrorism.

On 28 December 2002, Mezbar and his co-defendants, Frenchman Jerome Courtailler, Dutchman Saaid Ibrahim, and Algerian Abdelghani Rabia, were all found not guilty of terrorism by a Dutch court.
