= Nurul Amin (disambiguation) =

Nurul Amin (Arabic: نُور الأَمِين, romanized: Nūr al-Amīn, lit. 'Trustworthy Light'; transliterations vary) is a Muslim masculine given name. It may refer to:

== People ==
- Nurul Amin (1893–1974), Prime Minister of Pakistan for 13 days in December 1971
- Nurul Amin (Chittagong politician) (born 1968), Bangladeshi politician
- Nurul Amin (sports administrator) (1919–1991), Indian sports administrator, president of the All India Football Federation from 1975 to 1980
- Nurul Amin Khan Pathan (born 1942), Bangladeshi politician and former sub-minister of health
- Nurul Amin Talukdar (1946–2003), Bangladeshi politician and former MP of Netrokona-3
- Nurul Amin Ruhul (born 1959), Bangladeshi politician and former MP of Chandpur-2
- Md. Nurul Amin (born 1961), chairman of Bangladesh Energy Regulatory Commission
- Nurul Amin Bhuiyan, Bangladeshi politician and former MP of Lakshmipur-3
- Noor Ul Amin Wattoo, Pakistani politician and former MPA of Okara-VI, Punjab
- Noor-ul-Amin (born 1975), Pakistani cricketer
- Nurul Amin Hamid (born 1983), Malaysian politician and MP of Padang Terap
- Md Nurul Amin (Rangpur politician)

== Other uses ==
- Nurul Amin Stadium, a sports stadium in Nagaon, Assam named after the sports administrator

== See also ==
- Amin (name)
- Mohd Noor Amin, Malaysian businessman
- Musa Nur Amin, Somali politician
- Noor Amin Ahmad, Malaysian politician
