= List of people from Marrakesh =

A List of people from Marrakesh. See also Category:People from Marrakesh.

- Yusuf ibn Tashfin, prominent Almoravid king and founder of the city
- Amine Amamou, footballer
- Averroes, 12th-century Muslim philosopher
- Abd al-Mu'min, first Almohad caliph
- Qadi Ayyad, 12th-century Moroccan Maliki scholar
- Ibn al-Banna' al-Marrakushi, 13th-century Moroccan mathematician and astronomer
- Ibn Idhari, 13th-century Moroccan historian
- Abdelwahid al-Marrakushi, 13th-century Moroccan historian
- Ahmad al-Mansur, prominent Saadi dynasty king
- Abd el-Ouahed ben Messaoud, 16th-century Moroccan diplomat and ambassador to Elizabeth I of England; possible inspiration for Shakespeare's Othello character
- Ahmad ibn Qasim Al-Hajarī, prominent 16th-century Morisco who escaped the Spanish Inquisition and worked as an ambassador for Morocco
- Mohamed Abdelaziz, president of the Polisario Front
- Juan Goytisolo, Spanish novelist
- Yves Saint-Laurent, French designer and artist (1936–2008)
- Jean-Paul Gaultier, French fashion designer and grand couturier
- Elias Canetti, winner of the Nobel Prize in Literature in 1981 (1905–1994)
- Claude Auchinleck, British field marshal (1884–1981)
- Josephine Baker, American-French singer and dancer (1906–1975)
- Abdelali Mhamdi, professional goalkeeper
