= Kamel Daoudi =

Kamel Daoudi is a French-Algerian convicted for plotting to blow up a US embassy in Paris in June 2001. He pleaded guilty in a French court after being deported from the UK, and was sentenced to nine years in jail. He was stripped of French citizenship, and the French Government tried to deport him to Algeria, but this was refused by the European Court of Human Rights in 2012.

== Early life and education ==
Kamel Daoudi was born in Algeria. His father worked in France, and in 1979, the entire family emigrated to France to have a better life.

Daoudi grew up in a middle-class suburb apartment of Paris and was considered a good student in school. After the end of 1992, when the civil war erupted in Algeria, Daoudi began to help the French Government, as France wanted to prevent Algeria from becoming an Islamic country.

In the early 1990s, Daoudi's family suffered from income reductions and moved to a lower-class suburb, which made him very bitter about French society. He joined the Takfir wal-Hijra group led by Algerian Djamel Beghal.

Later, Daoudi graduated in Paris as a computer engineer and a computer expert and ran a French government-subsidized computer Internet cafe in a Paris suburb.

== Terrorism ==
In 2000 and 2001, Daoudi went through training in Al Qaeda's training camps in Afghanistan and was qualified in handling explosives to bomb.

Daoudi was arrested by British police on 29 September 2001 in connection with the US Paris Embassy plot, after he was deported from London, where he was detained, on 25 September 2001, following the arrest of Brahim Benmerzouga and Baghdad Meziane. According to the indictment, he used the Internet café in Paris to communicate with Al Qaeda and was supposed to assemble the car bomb for the US embassy attack.

He pleaded guilty in a French court and was sentenced to nine years in jail. He has been consequently stripped of French citizenship and the French government tried to deport him to Algeria, which was refused by the European Court of Human Rights in 2012.

Daoudi's trial, alongside five more defendants in the US Paris Embassy case, began on 4 January 2005 in Paris, France. On 15 March 2005 Daoudi was convicted on all charges against him in a Paris court and was sentenced to nine years in jail.
