= Amin Golestan =

Amin Golestan Parast
- Birth name: Amin Golestan Parast
- Born: 5 June 1988 (age 36)
- Origin: Dubai, UAE
- Genres: House, Deep House, Progressive, Tech House, Techno
- Occupation(s): DJ, Remixer, Record Label Owner
- Years active: 2007–present
- Labels: Ultra Records (2009) Spinnin' (2008), Audio Therapy (2009–2011), Relocate Records (2011–present)
- Website: www.amingolestan.com

Amin Golestan (Born as Amin Golestan Parast, 5 June 1988 in Dubai, UAE) is a New York based DJ, and music producer. He was voted the number one DJ in 2008 and 2009 in the Middle East and Asia, and was the featured artist on the 2010 DJ Magazine Middle East cover. Golestan also runs the label Relocate Records.

== Biography ==
Amin Golestan was born in Dubai and grew up surrounded by international DJs on the Dubai music scene. After apprenticing for some of the world's preeminent talent, Amin began to DJ in Dubai.

== Singles ==
- 2009 Amin Golestan, Marco G – Dagobert
- 2009 Amin Golestan, Xaver – Let's Do It Again
- 2010 Amin Golestan, Marco G – Sanctuary
- 2010 Amin Golestan, Marco G – Deadpool
- 2012 Nima Nesta featuring Mednas – Derby

== Remixes ==
- 2008 Terrabyte – Quadrophonia
- 2008 Steven Lee, Gaby Dershin – Flycatcher
- 2008 Funkagenda, Paul Thomas – Thrapp
- 2009 Muzikjunki – The Seashore
- 2009 Dave Seaman – Gobbledygook
- 2009 My Digital Enemy – Sunrise
- 2009 Starkillers, Austin Leeds – All The Way
- 2009 Austin Leeds, Steve Bertrand – Staring at the Sun
