= Amini (surname) =

Amini (Arabic: اميني, Persian: امینی) is a Muslim surname of Arabic origin, meaning a descendant of someone named Amin. It may refer to:

- Alexandra Amini, Canadian actress and costume designer
- Ali Amini (1905–1992), Prime Minister of Iran (1961–1962)
- Ebrahim Amini (1925–2020), Iranian Ayatollah and politician in the Assembly of Experts
- Mahsa Amini (1999–2022), Iranian woman whose death triggered international protests
- Mustafa Amini (born 1993), Australian association football player
- Max Amini, an Iranian-American comedian
- Moein Amini, an Economist and Ali Amini's grand-nephew
