= International reactions to the 2011 military intervention in Libya =

The international reactions to the 2011 military intervention in Libya were the responses to the military intervention in Libya by NATO and allied forces to impose a no-fly zone. The intervention was authorized by United Nations Security Council Resolution 1973, approved in New York on 17 March, in response to the Libyan Civil War, though some governments allege participants in the operation exceeded their mandate.

Overall response from governments was generally split between strong opposition and conditional support for the intervention.

== Supranational ==
- African Union – A committee of officials representing five member states — Mali, Mauritania, the Republic of the Congo, South Africa, and Uganda — was denied entry to Libya after the UN Security Council voted to establish a no-fly zone over the country. The ad hoc panel demanded an immediate end to the attacks on Libya.
- Arab League – The Secretary General of the Arab League, Amr Moussa, on 20 March said that the Arab League had wanted "the protection of civilians and not the shelling of more civilians", but on 21 March reiterated his support for the operation, something that is in accordance with what he said on 20 March, concerning the civilian casualties caused by the foreign intervention.
- Gulf Cooperation Council – The secretary-general of the GCC strongly endorsed the use of international force in Libya on 21 March, lauding coalition forces for "protecting the people from bloodshed". GCC member state Qatar is joining coalition efforts to enforce the no-fly zone.
- Intergovernmental Authority on Development - The Intergovernmental Authority on Development (IGAD) described the military intervention in Libya as an open invitation to terrorists. IGAD said, "Our fear is that what is happening now in Libya may motivate terrorist groups in Somalia, Afghanistan and Iraq to regroup on African soil.".

== Governments ==
=== Arab World ===
- Algeria – The Movement of Society for Peace, a Muslim Brotherhood-linked pro-government party in Algiers, called upon the coalition to halt military strikes against targets in Libya and urged the Arab League to affirm a "crystal clear and frank position on the side of the Libyan people". At a press conference after meeting with President Abdulaziz Bouteflika, Russian Foreign Minister Sergey Lavrov said that Russia and Algeria both oppose the international intervention in Libya on principle. On 21 March, Algerian Foreign Minister Mourad Medelci said his government believes "this intervention to be disproportionate in relation to the objective set out by the United Nations Security Council resolution" and demanded "an immediate cessation of hostilities and foreign intervention."
- Egypt – After the UN Security Council voted to establish a Libyan no-fly zone, Egypt declined to join in enforcement, despite having the largest military in the Arab League and voting with that body to endorse the no-fly zone's creation. Foreign Minister Nabil Elaraby said Egypt was choosing to stay out of the conflict due to the large number of Egyptian nationals in Libya. Presidential candidate Amr Moussa, the head of the Arab League, described airstrikes against Gaddafi's military in support of the UN mandate as "bombardment of civilians ... [that] led to the deaths and injuries of many Libyan civilians" and said he intended to call an emergency meeting of the Arab League, multiple members of which are now involved in enforcing the no-fly zone, to respond to the situation. Namibian press reported in early April that Egyptian embassy officials in Windhoek had indicated the Egyptian government's support for the resolution provided it led to the protection of civilians and the promotion of democracy.
- Iraq – A spokesman for the Iraqi government told Reuters on 21 March that Baghdad backs the military intervention that followed "to protect the Libyan people". Powerful Shia cleric Moqtada al-Sadr, however, criticized both the international action and the Gaddafi regime, saying the government in Tripoli should relinquish power but warning that airstrikes could cause civilian casualties.
- Jordan – The government was party to an international summit on 19 March in Paris to weigh military intervention in Libya after the UN Security Council voted to create a no-fly zone over the country, but a government spokesman said Jordan's armed forces would not be involved in enforcing the UN mandate. On 4 April, two Royal Jordanian Air Force fighter jets arrived at a military airbase in the European Union to support the coalition. Foreign Minister Nasser Judeh said they would provide "logistical support" and help escort Jordanian transports making use of the humanitarian corridor to deliver aid and supplies. Judeh also said his government was prepared to "pursue efforts at all levels" to help protect civilians and end the crisis.
- Kuwait – The government approved of the creation of the no-fly zone. UK Prime Minister David Cameron announced Kuwait would be making a "logistical contribution" to international military efforts in Libya.
- Lebanon – Lebanon introduced and voted for United Nations Security Council Resolution 1973, claiming to act on behalf of the Arab League.
- Mauritania – President Mohamed Ould Abdel Aziz condemned international intervention in Libya after France, the United States, and the United Kingdom spearheaded airstrikes against Gaddafi's forces in support of a UN mandate.
- Morocco – The government was party to international talks in Paris on 19 March to discuss how to implement the UN mandate in Libya after the UN Security Council voted for a no-fly zone. After meeting with an envoy from Gaddafi's government, Foreign Minister Taieb Fassi Fihri said on 18 April, "Morocco considers that ... the solution can not be military. It can only be political, forward-looking and allowing the Libyan people to democratically determine their future." Fihri also said that his government participated in recent conferences with members of the international coalition and allies, including the Paris summit, to help honor its "commitment to full respect for Libya's territorial integrity and national unity".
- Qatar – The government confirmed it was dispatching Qatar Emiri Air Force fighter jets to Libya on 20 March. "Qatar will take part in the military operation out of belief in the need for Arab states to contribute, for the situation has become unbearable in Libya", Emir Hamad bin Khalifa Al Thani said.
- Sudan – The government is reportedly allowing coalition airplanes to traverse Sudanese airspace during operations in Libya.
- Tunisia – The post-revolution government of Tunisia declined to join international military operations in Libya, with a spokesman saying it was "out of the question".
- United Arab Emirates – The United Arab Emirates Air Force was to be involved in enforcing the no-fly zone, but the government opted to narrow its mission to providing humanitarian aid before reversing itself and sending 12 fighter jets to the Mediterranean to support international efforts. On 20 April, Al Arabiya reported that the government called for more airstrikes, insisting that Gaddafi must leave Libya and would not do so peacefully.

=== Middle East ===
- Azerbaijan – An official in the office of President Ilham Aliyev recommended that the government formally approve of United Nations Security Council Resolution 1973, saying, "Ensuring the security of civilians in Libya is, of course, an important issue", though he complained that the UN was acting swiftly to stop Gaddafi's alleged crimes but was not making the same effort to enforce resolutions on Nagorno-Karabakh that the Azerbaijani government contends its neighbor Armenia has violated.
- Cyprus – The United Kingdom is making use of its military bases in Cyprus to support coalition forces enforcing the naval blockade and no-fly zone in the Libyan theater. President Dimitris Christofias said his government does not support the intervention and is unhappy over the UK making use of the bases, though he acknowledged the UK has the legal right to do so, as they lie within its overseas territory of Akrotiri and Dhekelia on the island. Christofias has previously expressed his desire to see the British military presence removed from Cyprus.
- Iran – On 21 March, Supreme Leader Ayatollah Ali Khamenei accused the West of having "come after Libyan oil". He also stressed that "Iran utterly condemns the behaviour of the Libyan government against its people, the killings and pressure on people, and the bombing of its cities... but it (also) condemns the military action in Libya". Khamenei stated that he support sending mediators rather than bombing the country.
- Israel – Prime Minister Binyamin Netanyahu said, "Western intervention in Libya will have a positive ripple effect in Iran and elsewhere in the region". Netanyahu also said "I would expect that the world put similar pressure on Iran. Iran is at least equal to Libya, and I believe that its importance is even greater." However, Foreign Minister Avigdor Lieberman suggested Israel should keep its distance from the Libyan opposition, while the Deputy Minister for the Development of Negev and the Galilee Ayoob Kara conducted talks with the Libyan government, represented by Saif al-Islam Gaddafi, for Israel to lobby the United States against intervention in exchange for the establishment of official relations and for Libyan assistance in the release of a Hamas captive. The negotiations continued until the opposition took control of Tripoli.
- Turkey – After initially opposing international intervention in Libya, on 20 March, the Foreign Ministry released a statement after the UN Security Council voted to impose a no-fly zone over the North African state saying "Turkey will make the necessary and appropriate national contribution on grounds that the operation will protect the interest of the Libyan people ... and provide them salvation". Kemal Kılıçdaroğlu, who leads the opposition Republican People's Party, endorsed international military action in Libya, saying, "If the United Nations has passed such a resolution, then this [operation] has gained international legitimacy", and praising Prime Minister Recep Tayyip Erdoğan's shift toward supporting the no-fly zone and other measures. On 21 March, Turkey's representative to NATO blocked the alliance, many members of which have already deployed forces to the Mediterranean for action in Libya, from formally joining enforcement of the Libyan no-fly zone, though Turkey voted along with the rest of NATO members for enforcement of a less controversial arms embargo. A deal was ultimately reached through intensive negotiations between Ankara, London, Paris, and Washington for NATO to assume responsibility for the no-fly zone as well.

=== Sub-Saharan Africa ===
- Angola - Angolan Foreign Affairs Minister, Georges Chikoti, said on 29 March 2011 in Luanda, that the Angolan Government defends dialogue for the resolution of the Libyan deadlock instead of a military intervention. Speaking to the press about the current international matters, the minister said that any military intervention may contribute to the worsening of the problem. According to him, this military intervention method may not be considered as a standard to solve problems in Africa. In addition, the official recalled that the situation started with demonstrations, which were repressed violently by Libyan authorities, a situation that must be slammed by the international community. He said that with the emergence of armed rebels the country dived in a kind of civil war.
- Botswana – President Ian Khama was strongly supportive of the resolution, saying all countries should support the "well-intended" international intervention. "The least we can hope for from this intervention is the intended protection from brutality, leading to death in many cases, of Libyan citizens opposed to Muammar Gaddafi and his dictatorship", said Khama.
- Cameroon – After meeting with President Paul Biya, the French ambassador to Cameroon said Biya concurs with the French position supporting the no-fly zone and the need for a ceasefire in Libya, the state-owned media outlet Cameroon Radio & Television reported on 28 March.
- Chad – President Idriss Déby Itno, who came to power with Libyan help, criticized the Western military intervention, warning it could have "heavy consequences" and worrying about the precedent it set. Chad's ambassador to the United Nations reportedly told journalists, "This has to finish fast." In a statement, the government asked for coalition forces to ensure the protection of Chadian nationals in Libya, whom it said rebels had "singled out", "paraded on television as mercenaries", and "executed".
- Ivory Coast – Deposed ex-President Laurent Gbagbo claimed that Gaddafi was the victim of a "neo-colonial" plan.
- The Gambia – President Yahya Jammeh urged Gaddafi to step down and criticized the African Union for its "unacceptable silence." the Gambian government arranged for the evacuation of over 300 citizens of ECOWAS countries on 19 March, state-owned media reported. The government of Gambia recognized the rebel National Transitional Council on 22 April.
- Gabon – Gabon voted for the UN resolution imposing a Libyan no-fly zone on 17 March in its capacity as a nonpermanent member of the United Nations Security Council.
- Ghana – Foreign Minister Alhaji Mohammed Mumuni said that the government supported the UN in its efforts to protect civilians, saying, "Right from the onset when the crisis broke, Ghana's position was that we want to stand by the people of Libya, and we want to defend their right to live in dignity and their right to be free from any violence." However, Mumuni said, the government does not appreciate the usage of the resolution to justify airstrikes in Libya.
- Guinea – The government refused to permit Guinean citizens to rally against the intervention and in support of Gaddafi on 25 March.
- Kenya – Vice President Kalonzo Musyoka expressed opposition to international intervention in Libya and said it was "the time for Africa" to negotiate a solution to the crisis in the AU member state. It was unclear whether he was voicing his personal views or representing the position of the Kenyan "unity government" in his comments.
- Liberia – President Ellen Johnson-Sirleaf called for an end to the airstrikes, saying her position is that "violence does not help the process whichever way it comes" and calling the situation "a tragedy on all sides as lives and properties are being destroyed", according to her press secretary.
- Namibia – President Hifikepunye Pohamba condemned the NATO intervention and described the intervention as "interference in internal affairs of Africa." In his official speech he said, "As we celebrate our 21st independence anniversary, our Libyan brothers and sisters are attacked by non-African forces. Namibia reiterates the decisions of the AU Peace Council and Namibia rejects in the strongest terms any interference in internal affairs of Africa." Several MPs and high-ranking ministers assented with Pohamba's position, with the deputy speaker of Parliament referring to the West as an "enemy ... planning day and night how to keep Africa in perpetual tutelage" and even attacking the International Criminal Court, from which she suggested Namibia should withdraw.
- Niger – The government prohibited a planned pro-Gaddafi, anti-intervention rally in late March.
- Nigeria – Nigeria voted for the UN resolution to establish a Libyan no-fly zone in its capacity as a nonpermanent member of the UN Security Council on 17 March. The Nigerian ambassador to Namibia said in early April that his government supported the resolution because it took a neutral stance and helped to advance peace while allowing humanitarian aid to continue flowing into Libya.
- Rwanda – On 22 March, President Paul Kagame told the BBC Africa Have Your Say programme: "It was the right thing to do. I fully support that. The fact that mistakes were made elsewhere in other instances doesn't make it right not to act in this particular case."
- Senegal – The government did not allow demonstrators protesting the airstrikes and expressing support for Gaddafi to march in Dakar, though it made no effort to prevent them from rallying in the Islamic Institute of Dakar on 30 March.
- South Africa – South Africa voted for the UN resolution to establish a Libyan no-fly zone in its capacity as a nonpermanent member of the UN Security Council on 17 March. On 21 March, President Jacob Zuma called "for an immediate ceasefire in Libya" and demanded that "operations aimed at enforcing the no-fly zone and protecting civilians should be limited to just that." He also demanded that "the UN Security Council Resolution should be implemented in letter and spirit by all members of the UN Security Council." Some unnamed government officials have voiced concern that three of the five African Union states on the five-nation ad hoc panel, of which South Africa is a member, intended to mediate the crisis are "financially reliant" upon Gaddafi and his regime. They reportedly questioned whether Pretoria should be party to the five-nation panel.
- Uganda – President Yoweri Museveni on 21 March accused Western nations of double standards, a thirst for more oil and declared, that he is "totally allergic to foreign, political and military involvement in sovereign countries, especially the African countries." He called upon the Libyan opposition groups, if they are patriots, to fight their war by themselves.
- Zambia – On 25 March, President Rupiah Banda said he backed UN Security Council Resolution 1973. "Zambia is a member of the African Union which supports the resolutions of the United Nations Security Council, and I am a member of the AU. I believe in it and I support it", said Banda.
- Zimbabwe – On 21 March, President Robert Mugabe sharply condemned international military action in Libya, claiming coalition nations are "vampires" trying to get their hands on the country's oil. The Movement for Democratic Change, led by Prime Minister Morgan Tsvangirai, took a milder tone, calling for a ceasefire.

=== Americas ===
- Argentina – The government opposed the NATO offensive and said that "all possible diplomatic resources had not been exhausted". President Cristina Kirchner has denounced coalition raids in Libya, saying, "When you consider that these so-called civilized countries are trying to solve problems by dropping bombs, it makes me proud to be South American."
- Bolivia – President Evo Morales demanded that U.S. President Barack Obama be stripped of his Nobel Peace Prize for authorizing the attack against Libya.
- Brazil – Brazil abstained from voting on United Nations Security Council Resolution 1973 and opposed the military intervention in Libya.
- Canada – Canada strongly supported both NATO and the UN with respect to military intervention in Libya under Operation Mobile. Canada committed six CF-188 fighter jets, two CP-140 Aurora maritime patrol aircraft, and two CC-130J Super Hercules tactical transports to the operation, as well as 435 military personnel. HMCS Charlottetown was also dispatched to the area and Lt.-Gen. Charles Bouchard of Canada took command of the NATO mission in Libya. JTF2 special operations teams are also reportedly working with British SAS and SBS teams.
- Colombia – Colombia, a nonpermanent member of the UN Security Council, voted to approve United Nations Security Council Resolution 1973.
- Costa Rica – In a written statement, the government backed the intervention. The statement read in part, "Costa Rica believes that governments have the responsibility of protecting civilians in case of conflicts. ... Attacks to human rights should never remain in impunity."
- Cuba – The government condemned the NATO military intervention in Libya. A statement issued by the Ministry of Foreign Affairs of Cuba said, "Conflicts should be resolved through dialogue and negotiation, and not by the use of military force".
- Ecuador – President Rafael Correa called the military intervention "unacceptable". A statement issued by the Ecuador's Foreign Ministry said the government "warned that the declaration of a no-fly zone by the Security Council of the United Nations on Libya could lead to broader intervention."
- Guyana – A government spokesman indicated support for the resolution, but the government has not yet made a formal statement.
- Mexico – A statement from the Ministry of Foreign Affairs on 20 March regarding the conflict in Libya said, "The terms of the UN Security Council resolution must be fulfilled."
- Nicaragua – The government condemned the intervention. Hundreds rallied in Managua against the international military efforts in several government-sanctioned demonstrations in the days following the passage of United Nations Security Council Resolution 1973. Miguel D'Escoto, an international relations adviser to President Daniel Ortega, strongly criticized the UN for passing the resolution, called it "a weapon of death at the hands of the empire". D'Escoto called the joint operation "a totally unjust war" and said it violated international law and the principle of self-determination.
- Panama – President Ricardo Martinelli compared Gaddafi to former Panamanian strongman Manuel Noriega and likened the coalition airstrikes on Gaddafi's forces to Operation Just Cause, the United States military intervention that removed Noriega from power in 1989. "What the Libyan regime has done ... deserves the punishment and condemnation of the entire international community", Martinelli said on 20 March.
- Paraguay – Foreign Affairs Secretary Jorge Lara Castro said the NATO bombing of Libya "reflects UN weakness, particularly at the Security Council".
- Peru – President Alan García expressed support for the NATO intervention. "[The intervention] is demonstrating that international law is fundamental to the coexistence of peoples", García said.
- United States – In June, 2011, Ohio Democratic Congressman Dennis Kucinich in a bipartisan Congressional effort filed a lawsuit against the Obama Administration for "violating the Constitution" and for taking the United States into war in Libya which was undeclared by Congress and ignoring the War Powers Act. The lawsuit also called for the immediate cease of appropriating all U.S. military funds in the Libyan war.
- Uruguay – President José Mujica opposed the Libya bombings by the NATO coalition, calling them an "inexplicable contradiction".
- Venezuela – President Hugo Chávez condemned the attacks, calling it an attempt by the West and the U.S. to control the oil in Libya. Chavez said about the NATO intervention, "They are throwing bombs, and those bombs fell down on any place such as a hospital or a house. That is something imperialistic, the indiscriminate bombings." After the death of Muammar Gaddafi, Chávez appeared to blame the United States, saying in reference to it, "Most regrettably, in their intent to rule over the world, the [Yankee] empire and its allies are setting fire to it."

=== Asia ===
- Bangladesh – Out of concern for Bangladeshis remaining in Libya, a statement from the government said asked for coalition forces in the Libyan theatre to interpret their UN mandate conservatively. The statement implored international forces to enact strikes "only when absolutely essential and solely for neutralising military targets". Dhaka also called for an internal solution to the emerging factionalism in Libya.
- China – President Hu Jintao said History has repeatedly shown that the use of force is not an answer to problems, but only makes them more complicated, "Dialogue and other peaceful means are the ultimate solutions to problems," and "If military action brings disaster to civilians and causes a humanitarian crisis, then it runs counter to the purpose of the UN resolution". On 17 March, the People's Republic of China abstained from voting on, rather than use its veto to block, the United Nations Security Council resolution to establish a Libyan no-fly zone. The Foreign Ministry said that it has "serious reservations" about a UN decision calling for a no-fly zone over Libya and regretted the military strike against Libya. Along with Russia, the PRC said the resolution's backers failed to explain adequately how the no-fly zone would work and what the rules of engagement would be.
- India – On 17 March, India abstained from voting on the United Nations Security Council resolution to establish a Libyan no-fly zone in its capacity as a nonpermanent member. The Ministry of External Affairs said, "India views with grave concern the continuing violence, strife and deteriorating humanitarian situation in Libya. It regrets the air strikes that are taking place. The measures adopted should mitigate — and not exacerbate — an already difficult situation for the people of the country". India called upon all parties to abjure use of or the threat of use of force and to resolve their differences through peaceful means and dialogue.
- Indonesia – Foreign Minister Marty Natalegawa called for a ceasefire and an end to airstrikes on 28 March and said his government condemned violence on all sides. On 5 April, President Susilo Bambang Yudhoyono said that after a ceasefire was agreed, Indonesia would gladly contribute to a UN peacekeeping effort in Libya.
- Laos – On 24 March, the Foreign Ministry expressed concern over international operations in Libya "which have caused the loss of lives and property of Libyan people and affected peace and stability in the region". It called for the end of military action and for all sides to seek a diplomatic end to the crisis. Also in August state owned Lao Airlines bought 2 Airbus A320 ordered by Afriqiyah Airways in which hit the United Nations Security Council Resolution 1970.
- Malaysia – The Foreign Ministry issued a statement on 19 March in which it "took note" of the resolution and expressed its hopes for a cessation of violence.
- North Korea – The government denounced the United States for the military intervention in Libya. In an interview with the Korean Central News Agency (KCNA), a Foreign Ministry spokesperson described the military intervention as "infringement on national sovereignty" and "inhumane crime against the people of Libya".
- Pakistan – The Ministry of Foreign Affairs issued a statement on 22 March, saying, "Peaceful political solution needs to be evolved by the Libyan people themselves in the spirit of mutual accommodation and national reconciliation." The statement also called Gaddafi's claims of civilian deaths resulting from coalition airstrikes "extremely distressing". On 28 March, Foreign Secretary Salman Bashir criticized the United Nations over the passage of the resolution and singled out the Australian government specifically for supporting it, saying, "It's one thing to pontificate from afar and quite another to actually understand a society you're trying to change. Pakistan will react very strongly against any attempt to intervene in the internal events of a sovereign nation." Bashir insisted that "the UN must respect the sovereignty of states and abide by the principle of non-interference and non-intervention" and called the no-fly zone "a mistake".
- Philippines – The Department of Foreign Affairs welcomed the resolution and said military operations were unlikely to affect Filipinos who have remained in Libya during the conflict. "This UN action is a humanitarian measure which is meant to safeguard the civilian population in Benghazi and other contested areas of said country", said a government spokesman on 19 March.
- Singapore – The Ministry of Foreign Affairs supported the resolution and endorsed its stated intent to protect civilians. The statement expressed hopes for a quick end to the conflict as so to avoid more loss of life on both sides.
- Sri Lanka – Foreign Affairs Minister G. L. Peiris said, "The government does not approve air strikes on Libya since they cause suffering to the people of that country."
- Thailand – Prime Minister Abhisit Vejjajiva said his government acknowledged and would comply with United Nations Security Council Resolution 1973, but expressed caution and said Bangkok would not likely determine its official stance on the intervention until a meeting of the Association of South-East Asian Nations.
- Vietnam – A Ministry of Foreign Affairs spokesperson said, "Vietnam is deeply concerned about the escalating tension and recent military activities in Libya with many consequences to the lives of Libyan people and regional peace and stability. Vietnam urges the parties concerned to exercise restraint, put an early end to military activities, promote dialogue and seek peaceful solutions in line with the United Nations Charter and the principles of international law and the respect of the independence and sovereignty of states."

=== Europe ===
- Albania – Prime Minister Sali Berisha supports the decision of the coalition to protect civilians from the Libyan regime of Gaddafi. In a press release of the Prime Ministry, these operations are considered entirely legitimate, having as main objective the protection of freedoms and universal rights that Libyans deserve. Berisha said his country is ready to help.
- Belarus – A statement issued by the Foreign Ministry said, "The missile strikes and bombings on the territory of Libya go beyond Resolution 1973 of the UN Security Council and are in breach of its principal goal, ensuring safety of civilian population. The Republic of Belarus calls on the states involved with the military operation to cease, with immediate effect, the military operations which lead to human casualties. The settlement of the conflict is an internal affair of Libya and should be carried out by the Libyan people alone without military intervention from outside."
- Belgium – The government committed several F-16 Fighting Falcon jets and at least one ship to aid in enforcing the UN mandate in Libya.
- Bosnia and Herzegovina – On 17 March, Bosnia and Herzegovina voted for a United Nations Security Council resolution to establish a Libyan no-fly zone in its capacity as a nonpermanent member.
- Bulgaria – Prime Minister Boyko Borisov made an official statement supporting the resolution and called for Gaddafi to step down, but told TV7 that the intervention was an "adventure" oil grab by the western powers. President Georgi Purvanov criticised the intervention, and said that NATO should have had a unanimous support for it. Foreign Minister Nikolai Mladenov dissented from Purvanov's position, calling the president's comments "absurd" and criticising him for airing his misgivings publicly.
- Croatia – President Ivo Josipović said that if it becomes necessary Croatia will honour its NATO membership and participate in the actions in Libya. He also stressed that while Croatia is ready for military participation according to its capabilities, it will mostly endeavor to help on the humanitarian side.
- Czech Republic – There was a considerable debate in the Czech Republic over its stance on Libya. Foreign Minister Karel Schwarzenberg appears to have flipflopped throughout the discussion. On 22 February, Schwarzenberg joined Georgian diplomat Grigol Vashadze in calling for the West to "punish" Gaddafi for his "violent actions. On 24 February, Schwarzenberg changed his stance to saying that the West should stay out of Libya. On 1 March, Schwarzenberg said that the West should intervene only if disaster threatened. On 20 March, Schwarzenberg said the EU should not "get involved too much", adding, "If Gaddafi falls, then there will be bigger catastrophes in the world. It's no use for anyone if we intervene there loudly, just to prove our own importance." On 21 March, Schwarzenberg appeared to backtrack after facing criticism for allegedly boosting Gaddafi saying, "At the moment, as long as the weapons are speaking, we can only hope and urge for this [conflict] to stop." The Czech Republic supports the EU's call for an "immediate end" to violence against civilians in Libya. On the same day, Schwarzenburg went further to say that the Czech Republic would join the operation if requested, suggesting that they could deploy their chemical unit if Gaddafi used chemical weapons; he also offered to take part in humanitarian aid. Schwarzenburg and Alexandr Vondra still expressed some doubts about the operation, they went further to slam Russian and Chinese obstruction as "hypocritical". They further said that NATO should lead the operation and that it would be inappropriate once that was the case for member nations to adopt separate stances. President Václav Klaus is against the no-fly zone over Libya, saying enforcing a no-fly zone effectively constitutes a war. The same day, former president Václav Havel released a statement criticizing Klaus' stance and saying that intervention was necessary as Gaddafi was an "insane dictator" and that by not intervening, the EU and NATO would be "risking lives". Havel further extrapolated Klaus' stance on Libya to the stances of those who "hesitated" with regard to Slobodan Milošević, and stated that views of that kind "had allowed many grave horrors to be committed". Klaus responded that he "opposed Havel's comments". The Czech Republic's Prime Minister, Petr Nečas, stated clearly on 18 March that the Czech Republic would not be involved in the implementation of the UN resolution, although he didn't rule out participation in humanitarian actions. A 30 March poll showed that Czechs were divided in whether they support the mission, with a near 50–50 split on support, but despite this, 70.1% opposed Czech involvement in the no-fly zone.
- Denmark – On 19 March, the Danish Parliament voted unanimously to send fighter jets to enforce the no-fly zone, marking the only time so far in the nation's history that military commitment was supported by full parliamentary unity.
- Estonia – Foreign Minister Urmas Paet told Estonian Public Broadcasting on 18 March that his government does not plan to participate in international military operations against Libya, but it would join them if requested to do so by NATO or the EU.
- Finland – Minister for Foreign Affairs Alexander Stubb said his government has "considered" participating in coalition efforts in Libya, but ruled out sending the Finnish Air Force's F/A-18 Hornets to enforce the no-fly zone and said he did not see a role for Finland in the coalition. President Tarja Halonen explained, "We are not, in this respect, a country that really specialises in air forces." She also warned, "Any use of force casts long shadows", opining that the international intervention could stretch on for "longer than we now believe".
- Germany – Foreign Minister Guido Westerwelle was skeptical of the no-fly zone and on 15 March called the idea "potentially dangerous" although he recommended greater political pressure be put on the Libyan leader. Accordingly, Germany, which was a non-permanent member of the UN security council, abstained from resolution 1973 on Libya. This decision was criticised from various political sides in Germany, including his CDU coalition partners, saying it was a "mistake of historical dimension".
- Hungary – Foreign Minister János Martonyi said that Hungary "is glad that this decree came to life, the UN made the right decision". He also noted that he wished such a decision would have been made sooner to save more civilian lives.
- Latvia – Foreign Minister Ģirts Valdis Kristovskis affirmed his government's support for the UN resolution, saying it was "unacceptable for the international community to remain in an observer's role" during the crisis. "The people of Libya ... should themselves decide their future, and therefore conditions should be put in place for them to do so freely", Kristovskis added. He also praised NATO's decision to take over international operations in the Libyan theater, saying it "raises hope that a sustainable solution will be achieved".
- Luxembourg – On 24 March, Prime Minister Jean-Claude Juncker said his government "generally welcomes" the resolution, to which he insisted on "strict adherence" on the part of coalition forces. Juncker added that he wanted NATO to take control of coalition military efforts in Libya as soon as possible.
- Macedonia – In a statement dated 21 March, the government in Skopje said it "supports and joins" efforts to enforce the UN mandate in Libya and called for a "peaceful and sustainable solution" to the political crisis in the country.
- Malta – President George Abela expressed strong support for the no-fly zone, telling The Australian on 27 March that "it has eliminated Gaddafi's air force", though he fretted the intervention might not have been "timely enough".
- Netherlands – On 22 March, the Netherlands agreed to aid military involvement. The government sent six F-16 Fighting Falcon, a naval ship, a refueling jet and about 200 personnel to Libya. They would not attack ground targets, but would be helping maintain the arms embargo.
- Norway – On 19 March, the government authorized the Royal Norwegian Air Force to head for Libya and prepare for missions there. Norway approved six General Dynamics F-16 Fighting Falcon fighters and necessary personnel.
- Poland – Prime Minister Donald Tusk announced that Polish soldiers would not take military action in Libya, although he voiced support for the UN Resolution and pledged to offer logistical support. Tusk stated in an interview that he was unenthusiastic about the operation.
- Russia – Russia abstained from voting on a UN Security Council resolution to create a no-fly zone over Libya rather than use its veto to block the resolution. Days later, the Foreign Ministry said that it noted "with regret this armed action, taken in conjunction with the hastily passed U.N. Security Council Resolution 1973". On 21 March, Prime Minister Vladimir Putin described the resolution as "defective and flawed" stating that it "resembles medieval calls for crusades", comments that were later called "unacceptable" by President Dmitry Medvedev. On the same day Russian Foreign Minister Sergei Lavrov commented after a meeting with the Secretary-General of the Arab League, Amr Moussa, that Moscow supported the Arab League resolution which had called for a no-fly zone over Libya.
- Serbia – The government issued a statement saying that Serbia is deeply concerned about the situation in Libya, especially the risks to the lives of civilians. The statement said that Serbia calls for the respect of UN Security Council Resolution 1973 and international humanitarian law in order to immediately stop civilian deaths and further demolition of the country and that Serbia fully endorses Libya's territorial integrity and wholeness. Foreign Minister Vuk Jeremić called on all three sides to immediately put an end to all military operations for the sake of protecting civilian lives. The ruling party representative MP in the National Assembly stated that while Serbia has a clear position to advocate for the respect of human rights it has a reason to believe that bombing a country is not the happiest way to reach the realization of human rights.
- Slovenia – The government "welcomed" the adoption of the resolution, which neighboring Bosnia and Herzegovina voted to approve, by the United Nations Security Council.
- Sweden – Foreign Minister Carl Bildt announced that his government would consider military action in support of a no-fly zone if it is requested by NATO. On 29 March, the government approved the deployment of JAS 39 Gripen multirole jet fighters to Libya to enforce the no-fly zone, though it included the stipulation that they will not be used to carry out airstrikes unless they are targeted by surface-to-air missiles or anti-aircraft artillery.
- Switzerland – The government "recognized" the UN Security Council's decision to mandate action on 18 March. Defence Minister Ueli Maurer said he didn't think the no-fly zone or airstrikes would be sufficient to stop Gaddafi. Maurer said he supported the resolution but wanted Switzerland to remain neutral in the conflict. Foreign Minister Micheline Calmy-Rey said that the Swiss policy of neutrality extended to the conflict, though she suggested that allowing coalition aircraft to use Swiss airspace for conducting operations over Libya was not a violation of that policy.
- Ukraine – In a statement on 21 March, President Viktor Yanukovych acknowledged the resolution and said Ukraine would comply with its provisions, but expressed caution and reiterated Kyiv's opposition to any effort by a foreign power to occupy Libya. Ukraine, he added, would continue to focus on efforts to evacuate civilians and nationals of Ukraine and its allies from Libya. "It is fundamentally important for us that even despite the establishment of a no-fly zone over the territory of Libya, all the possibilities of providing humanitarian aid and evacuation of civilians were preserved", Yanukovych said.
- United Kingdom – On 21 March, Parliament voted 557 to 13 in favour of the military involvement. A ComRes/ITN survey found that only one in three British citizens agree with the decision to take military action in Libya although the Londoners polled in the survey "agreed they would like to see Gaddafi removed, but not through bombing." A poll by YouGov a few days later showed that more of the British public supported the no-fly zone than not.

=== Oceania ===
- Australia – After the creation of a no-fly zone, which Foreign Minister Kevin Rudd vocally supported, Prime Minister Julia Gillard voiced strong support for international military action in the skies above Libya, though Defense Minister Stephen Smith said he does not expect Australia will send military assets to the theatre beyond possibly supplying humanitarian efforts with Royal Australian Air Force transport planes like the C-17 Globemaster.
- New Zealand – Foreign Minister Murray McCully praised the United Nations Security Council's vote to create of a no-fly zone over Libya, but added that he worried "it will be a case of too little too late". Prime Minister John Key also lauded the vote and international efforts in Libya, noting that New Zealand is adopting sanctions against Gaddafi's regime, but said he doesn't think New Zealand has much to offer in military assets for the no-fly zone. Although Key said he would not commit military support, he said, "It's quite clear that Gaddafi has been undertaking violence against his people, it's abhorrent, we want to see that end, and we do want to see a smooth and peaceful transition to a new leader." Labour Party leader Phil Goff echoed the government's support for intervention and said a solution should be sought as so not to leave the conflict at an "impasse".
- Solomon Islands – On 27 March, Foreign Affairs Minister Peter Shanel Agovaka said his government supports the resolution. "Solomon Islands will always support any resolution that aims to protect human rights and in this situation Resolution 1973 is fully supported", said Agovaka.

=== Non-UN member governments ===
- Abkhazia – The Ministry of Foreign Affairs published a letter from the "Association of Youth Organizations in Abkhazia" decrying the intervention and calling upon Foreign Affairs Minister Maksim Gundjia to communicate the opposition of "Abkhazian Youth" to "the war and violence of any kind" in both English and Russian on its website.
- Kosovo- According to a report by SE Times, Kosovo Albanians, likening Gaddafi's actions against the opposition to those of Milosevic twelve years earlier, widely sympathized with the rebels and were avid supporters of the idea of a no-fly zone. Secondary reasons that were told to reporters included the autocracy in Libya under Gaddafi, as well as Gaddafi's support for Milosevic and opposition to Kosovo's independence. Likewise, the Kosovar government supported the air strikes, with Hashim Thaci saying that ""Kosovo understands the importance of such interventions from 1999, and supports the efforts of the Libyan people for freedom and democracy, in becoming an important country of the Arab world".
- Republic of China – MOFA spokesman James Chang said government ministries were monitoring the conflict but did not believe the oil supply to the ROC's main island of Taiwan would be disrupted. The government also warned Gaddafi to comply with United Nations Security Council Resolution 1973 and stand down his forces.
- Vatican City – Pope Benedict XVI called for an immediate ceasefire by all sides. "I appeal to international organisations and those with political and military responsibilities to immediately launch a dialogue to suspend the use of arms", the pope said in the Vatican.

== NGOs ==
- The International Federation for Human Rights stated that it welcomed the resolution which finally offers protection to civilians in Libya, who are the targets of crimes which can be considered crimes against humanity.
- Kenneth Roth, executive director of the Human Rights Watch, stated that the Security Council at last lived up to its duty to prevent mass atrocities. He further commented the Arab League's role, stating that "the league had watched silently as Sudan's Omar al-Bashir committed crimes against humanity in Darfur -- or, less recently, as Iraq's Saddam Hussein massacred Shia and Kurds, and Syria's Hafez al-Assad destroyed the town of Hama. But the league apparently sensed the winds of change wafting through the Middle East and North Africa, and felt compelled to respond."
- In January 2012, independent human rights groups published a report describing the human rights violations committed by NATO during the conflict and accusing NATO of war crimes.

== Individuals ==
Muslim Brotherhood-linked Egyptian scholar Yusuf al-Qaradawi expressed his support for the no-fly zone put in place by the United Nations over Libya, saying, "The operation in Libya is to protect the civilians from Gaddafi's tyranny." Qaradawi also slammed Arab League leader and likely presidential candidate Amr Moussa for remarks criticizing the international intervention.

In the United States, the U.S. role in the intervention was criticized by prominent leaders of the U.S. Tea Party movement. On April 4, 2011, for instance, Tea Party leader Michael Johns, a former Heritage Foundation policy expert on global affairs, criticized Obama's Libyan intervention, saying "this mess of a policy is what it looks like to have a community organizer running American foreign policy."

Former Mozambican President Joaquim Chissano expressed "uncertainty" toward the no-fly zone imposed by the UN Security Council. "The military measures should not damage the people more than the regime", Chissano said.

The leader of the Muslim general council in Tanzania called international military intervention in support of United Nations Security Council Resolution 1973 an attack on Islam and described it as "barbaric" and a "massacre". The council called for an immediate ceasefire.

A French MEP and president of the National Front, Marine Le Pen claimed that the transfer of the US command towards NATO increased the submissiveness of the French Armed Forces. Denouncing "the US supremacy" in the military intervention, she "refused the idea that France slavishly followed the USA in this new stalemate". One month after the launching of hostilities, she claimed that France sank into Sarkozy's vote-catching war in Libya. She noticed that "the United Nations' mandate had largely been overstepped" and that "the deaths of civilians increased". Denouncing the planned dispatch of British, French and Italian military advisers to Libya and "Sarkozy's lies" about the war, she lamented the decision of the French authorities to compromise further France in "a new Afghanistan".

Noam Chomsky has criticized the intervention, saying that "[t]here was no effort to institute a no-fly zone. The triumvirate at once interpreted the resolution as authorizing direct participation on the side of the rebels. A ceasefire was imposed by force on Gaddafi's forces, but not on the rebels. On the contrary, they were given military support as they advanced to the West, soon securing the major sources of Libya's oil production, and poised to move on." He has questioned the motives of overthrowing Gaddafi, saying, "the vast territory of Libya is mostly unexplored, and oil specialists believe it may have rich untapped resources, which a more dependable government might open to Western exploitation."
