= Aminul Haque =

Aminul Haque (Bengali: আমিনুল হক) is a male Muslim given name, meaning "trustee of the truth". It may refer to:

- Aminul Haque (actor) (1921–2011), Bangladeshi film actor
- Aminul Haque (Attorney General) (1931–1995), Bangladeshi lawyer
- Aminul Haque (politician) (1942/1943–2019), Bangladeshi minister
- Aminul Haque (footballer) (born 1980), Bangladeshi football player
- Aminul Haque Laskar (born 1966), Indian politician from Assam
- Aminul Hoque (born 1970s), Bangladeshi-born British writer
- Aminul Huq Moni (1949–2015), Bangladeshi sports organiser
- A. J. M. Aminul Haque (1944–2011), Bangladesh Army officer
- A. K. M. Aminul Haque (1929–2022), Bangladeshi marine biologist
- A. K. M. Aminul Haque (general) (born 1968), Bangladesh Army officer
- Chowdhury A K M Aminul Haque (born 1934), Bangladeshi finance secretary
- K. M. Aminul Haque or Rajab Ali (died 2018), Bangladeshi war criminal
- Md Aminul Haque Bhuyan (born 1952), Bangladeshi academic and Vice-chancellor
- Sikdar Aminul Haq (1942–2003), Bangladeshi poet
- Syed Aminul Haque (born 1962), Pakistani politician

== See also ==
- Aminul
- Amin (name)
- Haqq (surname)
