= Youssouf Amine Elalamy =

Moroccan writer and visual artist

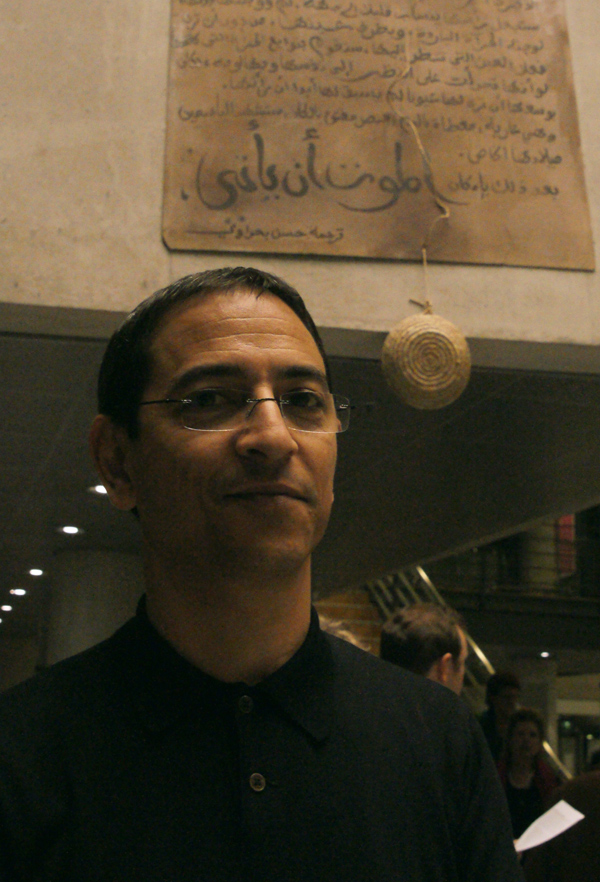
Youssouf Amine Elalamy in front of the finishing part of his last novel Nomade (2009), a literary installation, during exhibition in Copenhagen, December 2009

Youssouf Amine Elalamy (Arabic: يوسف أمين العلمي, born 20 November 1961 in Larache, Morocco) is a Moroccan writer, visual artist and professor of Media Studies and Communication at Ibn Tofail University. He has published his works mainly in French and occasionally in Moroccan Darija.

== Life and career ==
Elalamy attended the French Lycée Descartes in the Moroccan capital Rabat and then studied at New York University in the USA. There he received a Fulbright grant to research the representation of women in Moroccan magazines for his PhD thesis. At the same time, he studied advertising design at the Fashion Institute of Technology and the Parsons School of Design in New York City, graduating in 1991.

After a three-year stay in New York, he returned to Morocco, where he published his first novel Un marocain à New York (A Moroccan in New York) in 1998. For this novel he received the British Council International Award for best travel story and the 2001 Moroccan Prix Grand Atlas. In 2010 his novel Les clandestins (Eng. Stranded) was awarded the "Le Plaisir de Lire" prize. In September 2003 he published Le journal de YAE, a collection of essays inspired by the terrorist attacks of May 16 in Casablanca.

In 2006 he published the collection of short stories Tqarqib Ennab (Gossip) in his native language Darija (Moroccan-Arabic). For this, he also created posters inspired by the tarot cards of Moroccan clairvoyants. In an interview, Elalamy explained that with his rhyming texts he wanted to give literary status to the colloquial language. This work was subsequently performed in several cities in public squares in the tradition of ḥalqa, a traditional form of street theatre, by the Théâtre Nomade.

His 2015 novel Drôle de Printemps consists of 330 very short texts intended to correspond to the dynamics of the so-called Arab Spring as a chain reaction of events in several North African countries. As a tribute to Arab youth, the book's brief passages resemble posts on Facebook and other social media.

In addition to literary texts, Elalamy created graphic works for his book Miniatures, a series of fifty short portraits and collages depicting a cross-section of modern Moroccan society, that was presented in an exhibition. As a visual artist and curator, he has been a guest at international events, including the Berlin International Literature Festival,Soundscapes at the House of World Cultures, Berlin, the Winternachten Festival in Copenhagen and the Avignon Festival with a production of Stranded.

Elalamy is a founding member and past president of the Moroccan Pen Club. His books have been translated into Arabic, English, Spanish, German, Greek and Dutch, and some have resulted in artistic projects such as exhibitions or the presentation of literature in public spaces. These include the musical adaptation of Paris mon bled, the exhibitions of his work Miniatures, and the project Un roman dans la ville, which he presented under the title Nomade in the form of an urban literary installation in Marrakech, Rotterdam, Cologne, Copenhagen and Rabat. The goal was to publish his texts on large-format posters, inspired by the location, instead of just in book form.

Elalamy teaches Media Studies and Communication in the English Department at Ibn Tofail University in Kénitra. He lives in Rabat.

== Awards and honours ==
Elalamy received the prize of best travel account from the British Council International for his book Un Marocain à New York and the Moroccan Grand Prix Atlas 2001 for his novel Les Clandestins. In 2020, he was awarded the French Prix Orange du Livre en Afrique for his novel C’est beau, la guerre.

== Works ==
- Un Marocain à New York [A Moroccan in New York]. Eddif. 1998. ISBN 978-9981-09-013-2.
- Les clandestins [Stranded]. Eddif. 2000. ISBN 978-9981-09-013-2.
- Paris, mon bled, Eddif, 2002, 176 pages. ISBN 9981-09-081-6
- Miniatures, Hors Champs, 2004, 120 pages. ISBN 2-914164-05-X
- Oussama mon amour, La Croisée des Chemins, 2011, 187 pages.
- Amour nomade, La Croisée des Chemins, 2013,155 pages.
- Drôle de Printemps, La Croisée des Chemins, 2015.
- Même pas mort, Casablanca: Le Fennec, 2018.
- C'est beau, la guerre, Le Fennec, 2019.
- J'ai fait un dream, Le Fennec, 2022.
- Big le Grand, Le Fennec, 2022.
- Drôles de révolutions, graphic novel, Illustrated by Yassine Hejjamy, Le Fennec, 2023.
