= Amin Yousefi =

Iranian photographer

- Born: 1996 (age 29–30); Abadan, Iran
- Education: University of Westminster
- Website: aminyousefi.com

Amin Yousefi, (Persian: امین یوسفی) born in 1996, is an Iranian image-based artist and curator. His practice engages with photography, archival material, and image based research. He was selected for Foam Talent in 2024 for Eyes Dazzle as They Search for the Truth and received the C/O Berlin Award in 2026 for his project, Defensive Readiness: Revised Edition.

== Life and work ==
Yousefi was born and raised in Abadan, Iran. He completed his graduate studies in Documentary Photography at the University of Westminster in London in 2022. In 2026, his photobook Eyes Dazzle as They Search for the Truth was published by Luhz Press, with an essay by David Campany. The work revisits photographs of the 1979 Iranian Revolution through a process of rephotography.

== Awards ==
- 2024 RPS Award for Achievement in the Art of Photography (under 30yrs)
- 2024 Foam Talent Award
- 2026 C/O Berlin Talent Award, Artist category
