= Amin Ahmed Adel Youssef =

Egyptian swimmer

Personal information
- Born: 14 August 1947 (age 78)

Sport
- Sport: Swimming

Amin Ahmed Adel Youssef (born 14 August 1947) is an Egyptian former swimmer. He competed in two events at the 1972 Summer Olympics.
