= Amin Said =

Syrian journalist and historian (1891–1967)

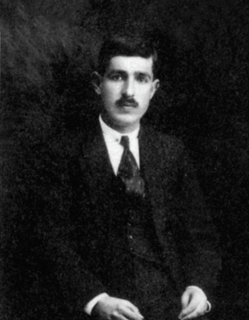

Amin Said (Arabic: أمين سعيد; 1891–1967) was a Syrian historian and journalist. He is the author of works on the history of the Arab national liberation movement.

== Biography ==
He was born on 28 November 1891, in Latakia, Syria. His father, Sheikh Muhammad Said Hassan Atari, was one of the luminaries in the field of literature and poetry. Amin Said was sent to the canonical school of Sheikh Mustafa Wazzan. His father, due to the need for qualified personnel in his printing house, sent his son to study printing in Beirut. Here he also learned French and studied journalism. From 1914 to 1918, he served in the Ottoman army.

After returning to his homeland, he studied journalism. He was the founder of the satirical newspaper Al-Urdun. After the discontent of the authorities, the newspaper stopped publishing, and Amin Said moved to Cairo in 1922. He continued his journalistic work in the newspapers Al-Mukkatam, the Middle East and the Arab Commonwealth. Since 1924, Amin Said, along with his journalistic activities, contributed to historical science by writing books about historical events. In 1965, Amin Said settled in Saudi Arabia. On 21 July 1967, he died in Lebanon where he was spending his vacation with his family.

== Publications ==
- "Modern Muslim kings and their states." – Cairo, 1933.
- "The Great Arab Revolution" – Cairo, 1933–1934
- "The History of Political Islam: the wars of Muslims against the Persians. The Conquest of Arabia, Iraq, and Persia" – Cairo, 1938.
- "The History of Political Islam. The Muslim wars against Rome, the conquest of the countries of Greater Syria and the states of North Africa" – Cairo, 1938.
- "The political history of Egypt from the French aggression of 1798 to the destruction of the monarchy in 1952" – Cairo, 1959.
- "Revolution. From July 23, 1952 to October 29, 1956." – Cairo, 1959.
- "Aggression. October 29, 1956 – February 1, 1958." – Cairo, 1959.
- "The United Arab Republic". – In 2 tt. – Cairo, 1959–1960.
