= Hassan Amin =

Hassan Amin may refer to:

- Sayed Hassan Amin (born 1948), Iranian lawyer, scholar and author
- Hassan Amin (footballer) (born 1991), Afghan-German footballer
