= Amin Mohammad Jamali =

Iranian photojournalist (born 1977)

- Born: 25 January 1977 (age 48); Tehran, Iran
- Occupation: Photojournalist

Amin Mohammad Jamali (born 25 January 1977) is an Iranian photojournalist and sports photographer. He is a contributor for Getty Images, and contributing with Vogue, The New York Times, The Times, The Guardian and ESPN.

The organizers have announced he has been among the finalists of the first edition of the AIPS Sport Media Awards from Asia and Oceania. In 2019, he joined ATP Images Co. founded by Arthur Thill in 1983 in Munich, Germany.

In 2025, Amin Mohammad Jamali was named in media reports concerning a leaked list of individuals alleged to have access to so-called “white SIM cards” in Iran, a category of telecommunications service described by Iran International as providing preferential or less-restricted internet connectivity to the Islamic regime's loyalists and officials in Iran.

== Major events covered ==
- 2010 FIFA World Cup – South Africa
- AFC Asian Cup 2011 – Qatar
- AFC Asian Cup 2019 - UAE
- 2014 FIFA World Cup – Brazil
- 2018 FIFA World Cup – Russia
- 2012 Summer Olympic Games – London
- 2016 Summer Olympic Games – Rio de Janeiro
- 2018 Winter Olympic Games – PyeongChang
- 2011 FIFA Women World Cup – Germany
- UEFA Euro 2012 – Ukraine & Netherlands
- UEFA Euro 2016 – France
- Vogue Fashion 2015 – Dubai
- Vogue Event 2016 – Turin
