= Amin Yunis al Husseini =

Jordanian politician (1929–2016)

Amin Yunis al Husseini (Arabic: أمين يونيس الحسين; 17 December 1929 – 19 September 2016) was a Jordanian politician.

Husseini was born in Jerusalem. He studied at the American University of Beirut and subsequently in St. Louis, Missouri, United States. Husseini obtained a BA in Economic Science and later an MA in Administration.

From 1951 to 1953 Husseini worked as a cooperative consultant in Sudan. In 1963 he was a member of the Parliament of Jordan for Jerusalem. From 1963 to 1965 Husseini was Minister of Foreign Affairs and Social Welfare. Between 1967 and 1970 he was Minister of Transport. Husseini served in the cabinets of Hussein ibn Nasser, Bahjat Talhouni and Abdelmunim al-Rifai.

He was a recipient of the Order of the Star of Jordan.
