= Amin Aghaei =

Iranian painter and sculptor (born 1982)

- Born: Amin Aghaei; 24 April 1982; Isfahan, Iran
- Known for: Painter, sculptor, Cartoonist

Amin Aghaei (born 24 April 1982 in Isfahan, Iran) is an Iranian painter, sculptor, and cartoonist.

== Biography ==
Aghaei was born on 24 April 1982 in Isfahan, Iran. He was supposed to be born in Khorramshahr, but the beginning of the war and occupation of the city forced him to be born in a center for Internally Displaced Persons (IDPs) in Isfahan.

He studied art at the Art University of Tehran and after several years of work in the field of cartooning, he is currently a painter and sculptor.

== Bibliography ==
=== Notable works ===
==== Solo exhibitions ====
- "Tajrobeh (Experience)", 01.2018–02.2018, Naranj Gallery, Shiraz, Fars, Iran
- “I Am Looking At You Through The Crack Of Door (Az Posht-E Shekaf-E Dar Be To Negah Mikonam)", 05.2015, Aun Gallery, Tehran, Iran
- "Labe Karoun (At The Karun’s Bank)", 02. 2013 – 03.2013, Aun Gallery, Tehran, Iran
- Solo Cartoon Exhibition, 12.2011, Pabianika Gallery, Pabianika, Poland
- Solo Illustration Exhibition, 01.2010, Ideh Gallery, Tehran, Iran

==== Group exhibitions ====
- "Iranian Artists And Their Preception Of Mexico Exhibition", 12.2018, Cultural Section Of Mexico Embassy, Tehran, Iran
- Tehran Animation Walk, "Animation Experiment" Collective in Collaboration With Asifa – Iran And New Media Society, 11.2018, Tehran, Iran
- Drawing Exhibition, 05.2018, Haft Samar Gallery, Tehran, Iran
- "7.3 Richter" Group Painting Exhibition, 12.2017, White Line Art Gallery, Tehran, Iran
- "1001 Under Glaze Plates (1001 Plates), 11.2016, Shirin Gallery, Tehran, Iran
- "In Khaneh (This House)" 09.2016, Iranshahr Gallery, Tehran, Iran
- "Characteristic", 12.2015, Vista Art Gallery, Tehran, Iran
- "The Great Game 56th International Venice Biennial", 05.2015, Venice, Italy
- "Paper" Group Exhibition, 04.2015, Dubai, UAE
- "Beyond Boundaries (Animation In New Art)" 9th Tehran Animation Biannual Group Exhibition, 03.2015, Tehran, Iran
- Nowrouz (Persian New Year), 03.2015, Aun Gallery, Tehran, Iran
- "The Joint Project Of Iran And Rio" Exhibition, 09.2014, Largo Gallery, Rio De Janeiro, Brazil

=== See also ===
- List of Iranian painters
