= Mednas =

Moroccan electronic musician (born 1978)

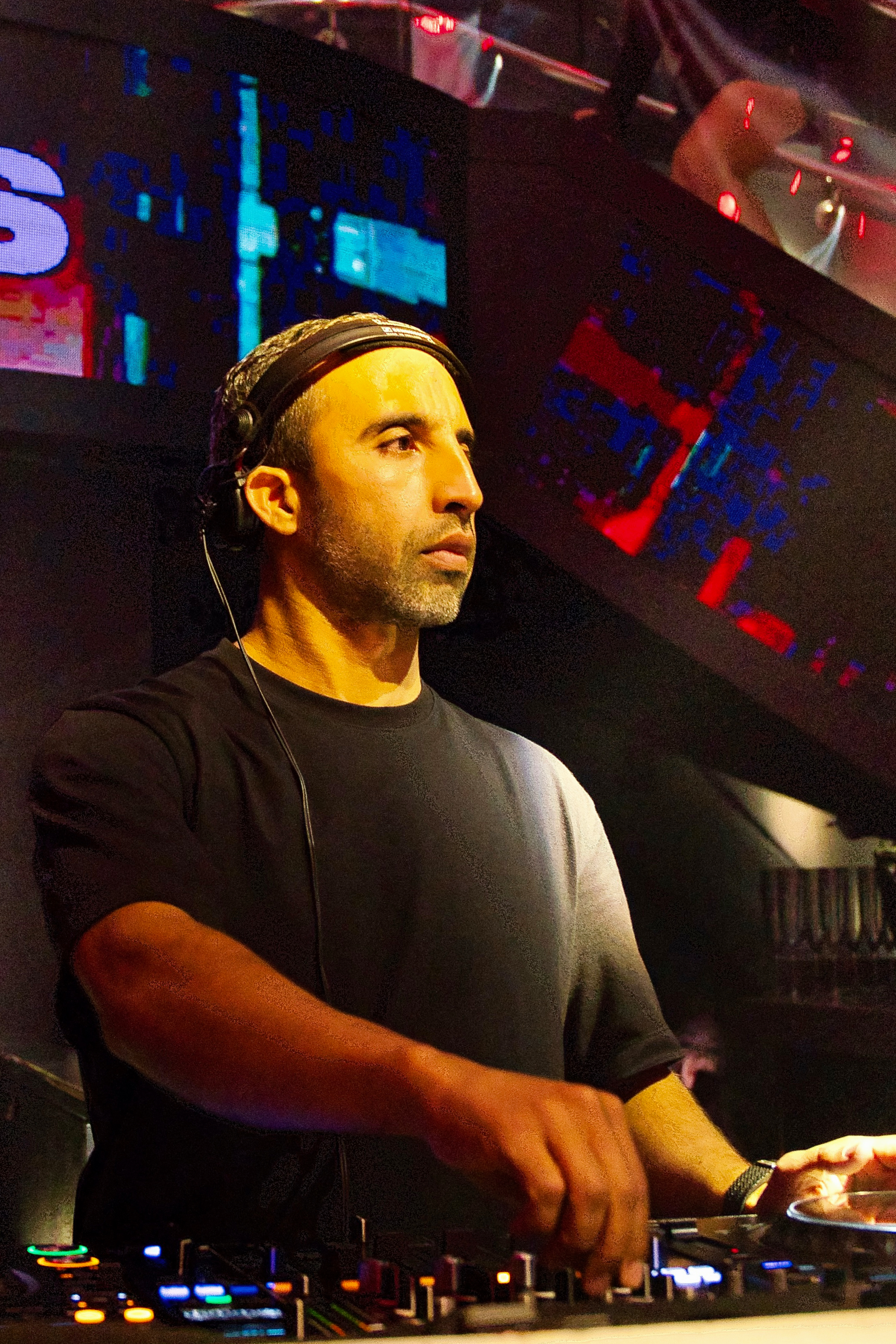
- Mednas at LIV Miami

Background information
- Born: Mehdi Nassiri; June 25, 1978 (age 47); Casablanca, Morocco
- Genres: Tech house, house
- Occupations: Musician, DJ, Record Producer
- Years active: 1996–present
- Labels: Size Records; Axtone; Spinnin'; Armada
- Website: www.djmednas.com www.mednasmusic.com

Mehdi Nassiri (born June 25, 1978), known professionally as Mednas, is a Moroccan DJ and producer from Casablanca. Mednas currently holds his residency at LIV, a nightclub located at the Fontainebleau Miami Beach.

== Life and musical career ==
=== Early life and career ===
Nassiri derives his moniker "Mednas" from a mix-up of his given name, Mehdi Nassiri. He was born in Casablanca and raised in Marrakesh and Tangier, Morocco.

To complete his degree in international business, Nassiri transferred to Saint Louis University Main Campus in St. Louis, Missouri. In 2008, he moved to Miami, Florida to pursue his career in music.

=== Musical influences ===
Nassiri has always enjoyed listening to different genres of music. He incorporates these various music styles into his DJ sets. When he DJ's, he adapts his song choices to the crowd's energy and preferences.

"With electronic [dance music], I can finally combine all kinds of music into one."

— Mednas

Nassiri lists his influences as Depeche Mode, Chaka Khan, Aretha Franklin, New Order, and Pearl Jam, among others.

=== Performances ===
Throughout his world travels, Nassiri has held residencies and spun at various venues. Living in Spain exposed Nassiri to the professional side of DJing, where he spun at clubs such as Pacha, Arena, Cool Ballroom and more. In Morocco, he spun at Pacha, Nikki Beach and Morocco's International Festival of Essaouira, which gathered more than 30,000 people.

A couple years after moving to Miami, Nassiri received a call from Erick Morillo asking him play at Arkadia for his Subliminal Sessions parties. Morillo was on the look out for a fresh new DJ, and Mednas fit the bill. He readily accepted the offer.

=== Radio shows ===
In addition to being solicited for club gigs, Nassiri has participated in international radio shows, such as the Radio FG USA monthly residency.

== Discography ==
Singles

- 2013: Carlos Cid and Mednas – "Argan"
- 2013: Dean Cohen & Mednas – "Apex"
- 2014: CID & Mednas – "iLL Behavior", Size Records

Remixes

- 2014: Cedric Gervais featuring Coco – "Through the Night", Robbins Entertainment LLC
- 2017: Sunnery James & Ryan Marciano featuring Clara Mae – "The One That Got Away", SONO Music
- 2017: Sunnery James & Ryan Marciano featuring KEPLER – "Nobody Told Me", SONO Music
- 2017: CID featuring CeeLo Green – "Believer", Atlantic Records / Big Beat
- 2018: Moquai & AKA AKA – "Home" (Mednas & Nikola Remix), Axtone
- 2018: Sunnery James & Ryan Marciano featuring KEPLER – "Coffee Shop" (Mednas & Nikola Remix), SONO Music
- 2020: Mednas – "All I need", Heldeep
- 2022: Öwnboss, Sevek - Move Your Body (Mednas Remix), Musical Freedom
