= Amin Karim =

Mohammad Amin Karim (Dari: محمد امین کریم; born 1 March 1959) is a Senior Political Board Member of Afghanistan's Hezb-e Islami Party under the leadership of Gulbuddin Hekmatyar .

== Early life and political activity ==
Born in Kabul, Amin Karim attended the Franco-Afghan Esteqlal High School (Lycée Esteqlal) before studying Sociology and Architecture in Strasbourg (France). In 1979, he founded the Afghan Muslim Student Organisation as well as the representation of Hezb-e Islami Afghanistan in France He was also one of the founding members of the Union des Musulmans de France, which was established in 1982. Throughout his youth and his studies, he travelled through the Mujahideen fronts in Afghanistan, fought against the Soviet occupation and gave conferences in universities and mosques across the world to raise awareness of the Soviet occupation in Afghanistan and collect donations for its victims. He guided many French doctors and journalists through his native country in order to provide assistance as well as audio and video evidence of the situation to the western media. Among them he took the Franco-German journalist and publicist Peter Scholl-Latour. Scholl-Latour made the report Allah ist mit den Standhaften on YouTube along his travels, showing exclusive audio-visual material of the Soviet occupation in Afghanistan. Karim also helped establishing the Hezb-e Islami representatives in Europe.

== Peace-talks with the Karzai-Government 2010 ==
In 2010, Amin Karim was part of a senior, five-member delegation which was sent by Hekmatyar to Kabul to hold negotiations with the Afghan Government. The meetings included many Afghan and foreign officials and the delegation proposed 17 articles as a platform to the Kabul regime and also to the ‘foreign governments’ in Afghanistan. According to Karim "this proposal was asking for the withdrawal of foreign forces from Afghanistan which would be followed by free and fair elections in the country in order to prevent the so-called civil war in Afghanistan". The delegation included Qutbuddin Hilal, Dr. Ghairat Baheer (Gulbuddin Hekmatyar's son-in-law), Qaribur-Rahman Saeed, Daoud Abedi and Amin Karim.

== Afghan Presidential Election 2014 ==
In the context of the 2014 presidential elections of Afghanistan, Amin Karim was invited to Kabul alongside other European-based Members of the HIA Political Council to support the independent candidate and former Hezb-e-Islami member Qutbuddin Hilal. The Hezb-e Islami Party did not participate in the elections but decided to support a like-minded runner if the respective candidate would accept the Party's conditions. The conditions consisted of "not signing the Bilateral Security Agreement with America and expelling foreign troops from Afghanistan".

== Political Peace Deal with the Ghani-Government 2016 ==
The deal signed with Hezb-e Islami in September 2016 was the Afghanistan government's first major success at negotiating a peace agreement with an insurgent group. In return for Hezb's renunciation of violence, the government promised to free Hezb prisoners, incorporate former insurgents into the security services, and resettle thousands of Afghan refugees living in Hezb-affiliated camps inside Pakistan. Most prominently, the agreement paved the way for Hezb-e Islami leader Gulbuddin Hekmatyar to return to Kabul after twenty years in exile<>.
