= Amin Taghizadeh =

Iranian footballer

Personal information
- Full name: Amin Taghizadeh
- Date of birth: 1994 (age 31–32)
- Place of birth: Tabriz, Iran
- Position: Defender

Team information
- Current team: Gostaresh Foolad
- Number: 24

Youth career
- 2011–2014: Gostaresh Foolad

Senior career*
Years	Team	Apps	(Gls)
2014–2017	Gostaresh Foolad	1	(0)
- * Club domestic league appearances and goals ‡ National team caps and goals as of 30 May 2016

Amin Taghizadeh (Persian: امين تقي زاده, born 1994) is an Iranian football defender who last played for Gostaresh Foolad in the Persian Gulf Pro League. Taghizadeh retired from football in 2017.

== Career statistics ==
Club performance			League		Cup		Continental		Total	
Season	Club	League	Apps	Goals	Apps	Goals	Apps	Goals	Apps	Goals
Iran			League		Hazfi Cup		Asia		Total	
2015–16	Gostaresh	Persian Gulf Cup	1	0	0	0	–	–	1	0
Total	Iran		1	0	0	0	0	0	1	0
Career total			1	0	0	0	0	0	1	0
