= Amin Amir =

Somali-Canadian cartoonist and painter

Amin Amir أمين عامر
- Amiin Caamir
- Born: 1959 or 1960 (age 65–66); Somalia
- Occupations: cartoonist, painter
- Website: http://aminarts.com/

Amin Amir (Somali: Amiin Caamir, Arabic: أمين عامر) is a Somali-Canadian cartoonist and painter.

== Personal life ==
Amir was born between 1959 and 1960 in Somalia. After the start of the civil war in the early 1990s, he moved abroad, living in various countries. In 2000, Amir emigrated to Canada. His family later settled in Edmonton in 2006.

== Career ==
Amir is a prominent visual artist within the Somali community. He works in a variety of genres, with his political cartoons being especially popular. Amir uses the Somali language in his texts, as Somalis comprise his principal audience. His drawings and paintings typically employ satire and caricature to champion socio-political change in Somalia. They tap into a deep reservoir of personal knowledge and insight. Amir's art also often features nostalgic, hopeful scenes based on his formative years in the nation.

Amir publishes his work under the professional sobriquet Amin Arts. His official website earns over a million hits a month. Additionally, Amir's political cartoons regularly appear in a number of major Somali media outlets, including Hiiraan Online.

In 2010, Amir launched his first Canadian art exhibition at the Edmonton City Hall. The five paintings depicted key, personal moments in his life. Among these are his early forays drawing with charcoal, a time his wife saved his life, and reunification with his family at a local airport.

Besides his own visual art, Amir also serves as a mentor for other cartoonists and painters. He plans to start a program for aspiring young artists in Edmonton, helping them to illustrate their emotions and ideas.

== Awards ==
Amir has won various awards and recognition for his art. In 2004, Hiiraan Online named him its Person of the Year. He was also presented with an Award of Excellence and Lifetime Achievement by the Subiye Development Volunteers Organization and other NGOs. Additionally, Amir was a runner-up in the 2011 Hadaf Somalia International Cartoon Competition.
