= Amine Bermak =

French researcher

Amine Bermak from the Hong Kong University of Science and Technology, Clear Water Bay, Kowloon, Hong Kong was named Fellow of the Institute of Electrical and Electronics Engineers (IEEE) in 2013 for contributions to sensing and processing of vision and olfactory circuits and systems.
