= Amin Madani =

Saudi historian and writer (1911–1984)

- Born: 1911; Saudi Arabia
- Died: 1984 (aged 72–73); Saudi Arabia
- Resting place: Saudi Arabia
- Occupations: Writer and historian
- Writing career
- Language: Arabic
- Genre: History

Amin Abd Allah Madani (Arabic: أمين عبد الله مدني; 1911-1984) was a leading historian, writer, journalist, and researcher in historical, social, and political studies. He was also the first editor-in-chief of Al-Madinah Al-Munawwarah newspaper when it was published in 1937, and he is the father of the minister Iyad bin Amin Madani.

== Early life ==
Madani was born in Al-Madinah Al-Munawwarah in 1329H and had five children. He studied high school in Al-Madinah Al-Munawwarah school and continued his studies in Al-Masjid an-Nabawi and was taught by distinguished professors among them: Sheikh Muhammad Al-Tayyib Al-Ansari, Ahmed Faydabadi, and Sheikh Ibrahim Berri. After that, he went in the direction of reading and researching and travel, and self-education, like the generation of the founding pioneers of the cultural renaissance in the Arabian Peninsula in the modern era.

== Publications ==
=== Printed books ===
- Arab history and its beginnings.
- Arab history and its sources.
- Arab history and geography
- Investment banking and joint stock companies in Islamic legislation.
- Islamic culture and its metropolis.

=== Books made to be printed ===
- Arab history and its peoples.
- Arab history and countries.
- The events of Medina in sixty years.
- India trip.
- Tihama trip.
- Morphological studies.

== Education and research ==
Madani conducted a large number of studies and historical, social, and political research over a period of fifty years or more, and was published in magazines and Saudi newspapers: Medina, Okaz, Riyadh, Al-Bilad, Al-Manhal, Al-Majalla Al-Arabiya, Caravan Al-Zeit, in addition to a number of Egyptian and Lebanese newspapers and magazines and his writing style mainly revolved around analysis, accuracy, investigation, and courage in expressing opinions, even if it contradicts the prevailing opinions.

== Lectures ==
Madani gave multiple lectures in various fields, local and international forums, and public and private events and forums, such as literary forums in Madinah, including the Association of Lectures, and the Literary Concert. Some of the lectures and opening words given by him include:

- The opening speech of the ceremony honoring Amin Al-Husseini, Riad Al-Solh, and their group in Madinah in 1355H.
- A lecture in the Muslim World League on Islam and racism in 1385H and was published in the book of lectures issued by the League.
- Another lecture in the Muslim World League entitled: Islam is a religion of reason and action in 1386H.

== Participation in councils and committees ==
- Head of the aid agency in Jizan.
- Head of the Financial Regulatory and Reform Authority.
- Represented Medina in several official delegations to represent Medina in various political and social events.

== Awards ==
The Amin Madani award for research in the history of the Arabian Peninsula was established in 1414H, and a documentary recording of the first award ceremony was issued by the Madinah Literary Club in 1416H in 155 pages.
