= Amin Shouman =

Egyptian basketball player

Personal information
- Nationality: Egyptian
- Born: 14 December 1954 (age 70)

Sport
- Sport: Basketball

Amin Shouman (born 14 December 1954) is an Egyptian basketball player. He competed in the men's tournament at the 1984 Summer Olympics.
