= Khalil Amine =

Moroccan scientist

- Born: December 1, 1962 (age 63); Morocco
- Education: University of Bordeaux
- Organization(s): Argonne National Laboratory, Stanford University, Imam Abdulrahman Bin Faisal University, University of Chicago
- Known for: development of advanced battery materials
- Website: https://www.anl.gov/profile/khalil-amine

Khalil Amine (born 1962) is a materials scientist at Argonne National Laboratory, an Argonne distinguished fellow, and group leader of the Battery Technology group. His research team is focused on the development of advanced battery systems for transportation applications. In addition to his Argonne position, he has appointments at Stanford University, Imam Abdulrahman Bin Faisal University, and the University of Chicago.

For his contributions in the field of electrochemical materials development, Amine was awarded the Global Energy Prize in 2019, and Scientific American's Top Worldwide 50 Research Leader Award in 2003. In 2017, Amine was chosen as a Fellow of the Electrochemical Society. He is the founder and chairman of the Advanced Lithium Battery for Automotive Application (ABAA) global conference.

== Early career and education ==
Amine received his Ph.D. in materials science in 1989 from the University of Bordeaux in France. After completing his doctorate, Amine did postdoctoral studies at Katholieke Universiteit Leuven in Belgium. Moving to Japan in the early 1990s, Amine held various positions at Japan Storage Battery Company, the Osaka National Research Institute, and Kyoto University, before moving to Argonne National Laboratory in 1998.

== Research ==
=== Lithium-Ion battery cathode materials ===
● In 1996, Amine reported the synthesis and electrochemistry of the ordered spinel cathode material LiNi_{0.5}Mn_{1.5}O_{4} (1996), often called "5V spinel" known for its cycling stability and high voltage compared to other lithium-ion oxide cathodes.

● in 2005, Amine co-developed the lithium-ion cathode materials termed NMC (patent issued 2005). NMC is widely used in consumer electronics and electric vehicles including the GM Chevy Volt and Bolt. Later improvements by Amine and Yang Kook Sun from Hanyang University, improved the standard NMC cathode performance by creating a gradient composition that increases the surface stability of the material.

● In 2007, Amine's group advanced Lithium-air technology through development of a closed oxygen system that reversibly stores energy in the system superoxide (O_{2}^{−}) anion to the peroxide (O_{2}^{−2}) anion. The net reaction is (LiO_{2} +Li –-> Li_{2}O_{2}).

== Honors and awards ==
- National Academy of Engineering, 2025
- National Academy of Inventors, 2021
- Global Energy Prize, 2019
- Electrochemical Society Battery Research Award, 2019
- International coalition for energy storage and innovation award, 2019
- Elsevier Energy Storage Material Journal Award, Shenzhen, October 2018
- Named Highly-Cited Researcher in 2017, 2018 and 2019 by Clarivate Analytics
- Named one of the most cited authors in energy storage between 1998 and 2008 by ScienceWatch
- NAATBatt Lifetime Achievement Award, 2017
- US Department of Energy Outstanding Scientist Award, 2013
- International Battery Association Award (2010)
- Electrochemical Society Battery Technology Award, 2010
- US Federal Laboratory Award for Excellence in Technology Transfer (2009)
- University of Chicago's Board of Governors’ Distinguished Performance Award, 2008
- Scientific American Top Worldwide 50 Research Leader Award, 2003

== Memberships and service ==
- Fellow of the Electrochemical Society, 2017
- Fellow of the Hong Kong Hong Kong Institute of Advanced Studies
- Member of the American Ceramic Society
- Member of the Material Research Society
- Member of the American Chemical Society
- Chair of the International Meeting on Lithium Batteries
- Associate Editor of Nano Energy Journal
- Founded the International Conference on Advanced Lithium Batteries for Automotive Applications (ABAA) and chaired the conference from 2009 through 2012
- President of IMLB association

== Selected patents ==
- US patent US6420069B2, positive electrode for lithium battery
- US patent US7468223B2, lithium metal oxide electrodes for lithium cells and batteries
- US8591774B2, Methods for preparing materials for lithium-ion batteries
- US patent US9593413B2, Composite materials for battery applications
