= Amin al-Shami =

- Died: 11 October 2011
- Allegiance: Yemen
- Service / branch: Yemeni Air Force
- Rank: Colonel

Amin al-Shami was a Yemeni Air Force colonel. He died in a car bombing on 11 October 2011.
