= Amin Tarzi =

Amin Tarzi is the director of Middle East studies at the Marine Corps University in Quantico, Virginia.

Tarzi has been an analyst for Radio Free Europe, Radio Liberty, and senior fellow with the Center for Advanced Defense Studies. He has been a senior research associate for the Middle East at the Center for Nonproliferation Studies of the Monterey Institute of International Studies, where he taught graduate seminars on Middle East security policies and threat perceptions. Tarzi has also served as Political Advisor to the Saudi Arabian Mission at the United Nations and as Researcher/Analyst at the Emirates Center for Strategic Studies and Research in Abu Dhabi, United Arab Emirates

== Career ==
Tarzi's areas of research include the history, politics and state-building process in Afghanistan, U.S. policy in Iraq and the proliferation of weapons of mass destruction in the Middle East, and Iranian security and threat perceptions including its missile and nuclear programs.

He has also served as a member of the United States Marine Corps. Tarzi earned his Ph.D. and MA from New York University, and holds a BA from Queens College in New York City. He is part of the historic Tarzi family from Afghanistan.

== Works cited ==
- Crews, Robert D., and Amin Tarzi, eds. The Taliban and the Crisis of Afghanistan. Hardcover ed. Boston: Harvard Univ. Pr., 2008.
- Tarzi, Amin, and Kimberly McCloud. "Taliban". Encyclopedia of Islam and the Muslim World. 2004. MacMillan Reference U.S. 30 May 20072.
