= Amin Khatibi =

Iranian footballer

Personal information
- Full name: Mohammad Amin Bana Khatibi
- Date of birth: 15 June 1997 (age 29)
- Place of birth: Tabriz, Iran
- Position: Midfielder

Team information
- Current team: Gostaresh Foolad
- Number: 17

Youth career
- 2011–2014: Gostaresh Foolad

Senior career*
Years	Team	Apps	(Gls)
2014–	Gostaresh Foolad	2	(0)
- * Club domestic league appearances and goals as of 19 June 2016

Amin Khatibi (Persian: امين خطيبي, born June 15, 1997, in Tabriz, Iran) is an Iranian footballer who currently plays for Gostaresh Foolad in the Iran Pro League.
