= Amin Dakheli =

Egyptian gymnast (born 1936)

- احمد امين داخلي
- Full name: Ahmed Amin Dakheli
- Born: 1936 Cairo, Kingdom of Egypt
- Died: 29 April 1966 (aged 29–30)

Gymnastics career
- Discipline: Men's artistic gymnastics
- Country represented: United Arab Republic
Medal record
Men's artistic gymnastics
Representing United Arab Republic
Mediterranean Games
Gold medal – first place	1959 Beirut	Team
Bronze medal – third place	1959 Beirut	Vault

Ahmed Amin Dakheli (1936 – 29 April 1966) was an Egyptian gymnast. He competed in eight events at the 1960 Summer Olympics. He died from an injury while performing a gymnastics routine.
