= Amine Karam =

French footballer (born 1984)

Personal information
- Date of birth: 3 January 1984 (age 42)
- Place of birth: France
- Positions: Forward; winger; midfielder

Senior career*
Years	Team	Apps	(Gls)
2002/2003	Sochaux		
2004-2005	Oxford United	2	(0)
2006-2007	Saint-Pauloise		
2007/2008	Vannes OC	3	(0)
2010	Saint-Pauloise		
2010	AS Ornans	4	(0)
2011	Chabab Rif Al Hoceima		
2012	Aviron Bayonnais	2	(0)
2012-2013	FC Serrières		
2013-2014	Yverdon Sport		
2014-2015	FC Orbe		
2015/2016	Besançon Football	2	(0)
- FC La Sarraz-Eclépens
- * Club domestic league appearances and goals

Amine Karam (born 3 January 1984) is a French former footballer.

== Career ==
=== England ===
Cleared to compete for Oxford United on the last day of the 2005 clearance deadline, Karam debuted in the Oxfordshire Senior Cup quarter-final with the reserves, showing good touches as they knocked out Carterton Town 2–0. However, despite settling on a one-month contract, he had limited first team opportunities and was gone that summer.

At Oxford United, Karam made two appearances in the Football League Two, against Notts County and Swansea City, and scored zero goals.

=== Reunion ===
Arriving at Saint-Pauloise over the month of February 2006, the Frenchman debuted during a defeat to AS Excelsior, supplying an assist to Romain Tossem to brush past Seychelles' St Michel United 1–0.

=== Morocco ===
An addition to CR Al Hoceima in January 2011, the winger stated that recent good results portended a better showing for the club during the second half of 2010/11, but they ended up finished 12th. He also claimed that the Moroccan top division had potential and was good for individual skills.
