= Mohammed Amine Smaili =

Mohammed Amine Smaili (محمد أمين الإسماعيلي) is a Muslim theologian and specialist in international Muslim dogma and comparative religion. Smaili was made professor at Mohammed V University in Morocco and has held several positions, including Director of the Office of the Minister of Endowments and Islamic Affairs.

Since 1994, his research and its relevance to peace and inter-religious dialogue has led to meeting officials of the Apostolic Nunciature to Morocco. Smaili's work has enabled him to attend and be involved in international meetings organized by the lay Catholic association, Community of Sant'Egidio. In 2008 in Cyprus, Smaili was a panel member for the audience event, Peace in the Mediterranean: Faiths, Conflicts and the Challenge of Coexistence. And in 2010 Smaili was a guest at The Islamic-Christian dialogue today, a Conference held at the Auditori del Palau Falguera in Barcelona.

Smaili has written five books, including Imam Malik and Imam Ahmed Hanbal Bnou.

He departed this life on Sunday, June 1, 2025
