= Jorge Lara Castro =

Paraguayan lawyer, sociologist, and diplomat

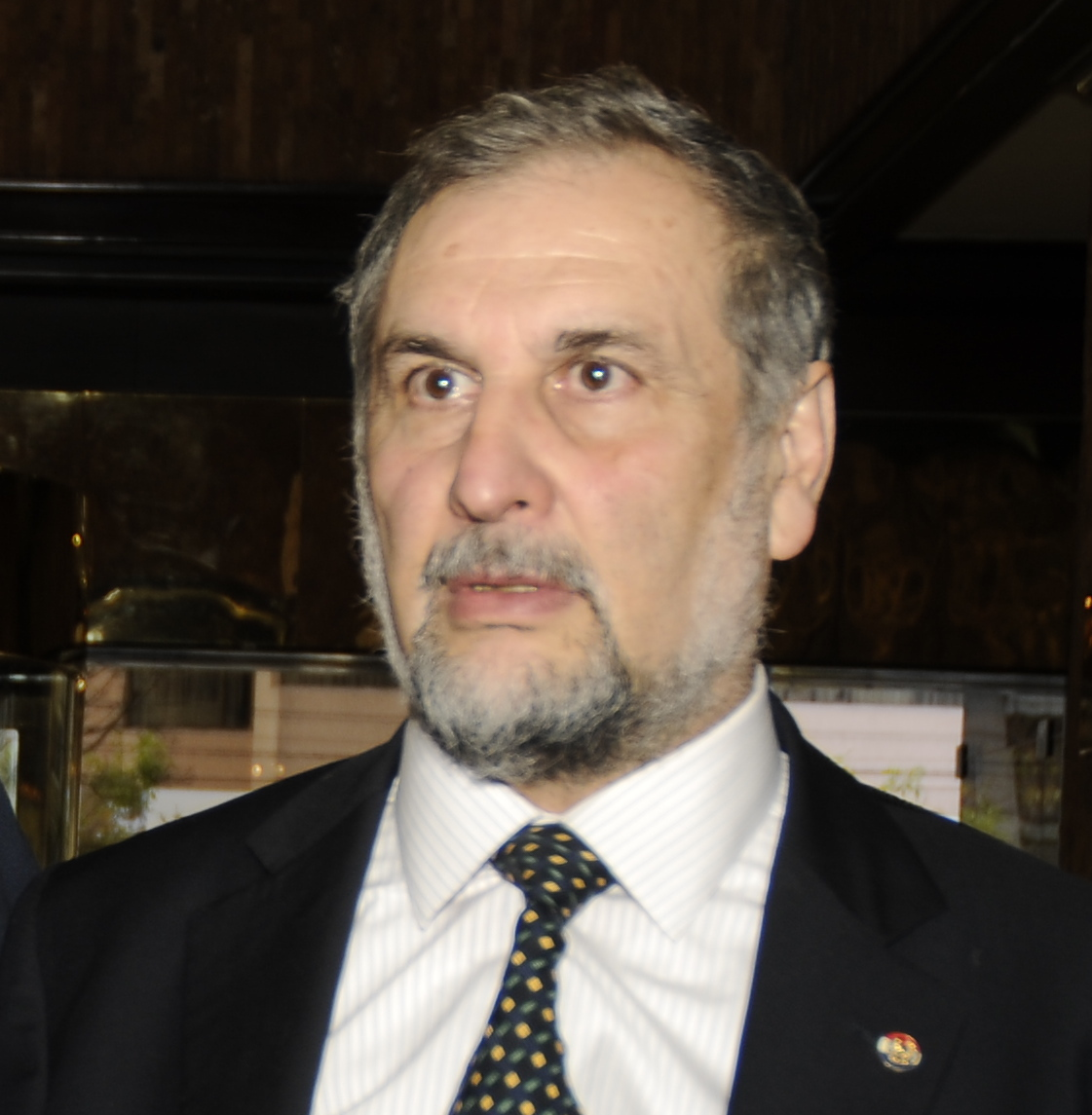
Jorge Lara Castro.

Jorge Lara Castro (born 5 August 1945 in Asunción) is a Paraguayan lawyer, sociologist, and diplomat.

He served as the Paraguayan Minister of Foreign Affairs in the cabinet of Fernando Lugo (2011-2012).
