= 2001 bomb plot in Europe =

Planned terror attacks around Europe

In 2001, a network of interconnected terrorist cells in France, Belgium, and the Netherlands was uncovered by law enforcement. The network had connections to al-Qaeda and was planning to commit one or more bombings.

== Plot ==
Three cells were involved: one in Rotterdam, one in Brussels, and one in a suburb of Paris. According to Djamel Beghal, a French-Algerian national arrested for attempting to enter France with a fake passport, Nizar Trabelsi planned to strap a bomb onto himself, cover it up with a business suit, and then detonate the bomb along with himself in the U.S. Embassy in Paris. Concurrently, a van packed with explosives would be detonated outside a U.S. cultural centre at the nearby Place de la Madeleine. Trabelsi denied this, but admitted that he had planned to commit a suicide bombing by detonating a car bomb next to the canteen at Kleine Brogel Air Base in Belgium. Trabelsi also said that he had met Osama bin Laden and personally requested to become a suicide bomber.

== Investigation ==
Beghal was arrested on 28 July 2001 in Dubai as he was attempting to travel back to Europe on a false French passport after visiting an al-Qaeda camp in Afghanistan. During interrogation, Beghal said that there was a plan to attack the U.S. Embassy in Paris and told investigators of terrorist cells in Rotterdam and Paris. He also said that Abu Zubaydah, a close associate of Osama bin Laden, had ordered the attack. After being extradited from the United Arab Emirates to France on 1 October 2001, Beghal retracted his confession, saying that it had been extracted using torture.

Surveillance of a suspected terrorist cell led by Kamel Daoudi in Corbeil-Essonnes near Paris started on 10 September. Following surveillance officers overhearing discussion of destroying evidence, French police moved in and arrested seven men on 21 September. Daoudi was not among the arrested, but he was shortly thereafter arrested in Leicester and extradited from the United Kingdom to France on 29 September 2001.

Dutch police started surveilling the Rotterdam cell in August. The four members of the cell were arrested on 13 September.

Police became aware of a connection between the Rotterdam cell and one led by Trabelsi in Brussels. Trabelsi and a Belgian Moroccan were arrested in two different areas of the Brussels metropolitan area on 13 September in an operation coordinated with the arrests in the Netherlands on the same day. At Trabelsi's apartment, police found machine pistols, chemical formulas for bomb-making, detailed maps of the U.S. embassy in Paris, and a business suit. In a restaurant run by one of Trabelsi's associates, police found materials that could have been used to make a bomb capable of blowing up a building.

== Legal proceedings ==
In December 2002, four men were found not guilty of charges relating to the plot by a Dutch court, citing insufficient and improperly obtained evidence. Two of them, Jérôme Courtailler and Abdelghani Rabia, were convicted in absentia of belonging to a terrorist organization by an appellate court on 21 June 2004, and Courtailler turned himself in on 24 June.

Nizar Trabelsi was sentenced to ten years in prison by a Belgian court on 30 September 2003 for the attempted destruction of public property, illegal arms possession, and membership in a private militia, reflecting Belgium's lack of specific anti-terrorism laws at the time. It was the largest terrorism trial the country had held up to that point; seventeen others were convicted of lesser offences and another five were acquitted. Trabelsi was extradited to the United States in 2013.

Six men were convicted of criminal association in relation with a terrorist enterprise by a French court on 15 March 2005; Djamel Beghal and Kamel Daoudi were sentenced to ten and nine years in prison, respectively, and the other four received sentences ranging from one to six years in prison. Beghal was released in 2010. Daoudi was released from prison in 2008, whereupon he was to be deported to Algeria. However, the European Court of Human Rights blocked the order, and he was instead placed under house arrest.
