= Amin Bonsu =

Ghanaian Muslim cleric

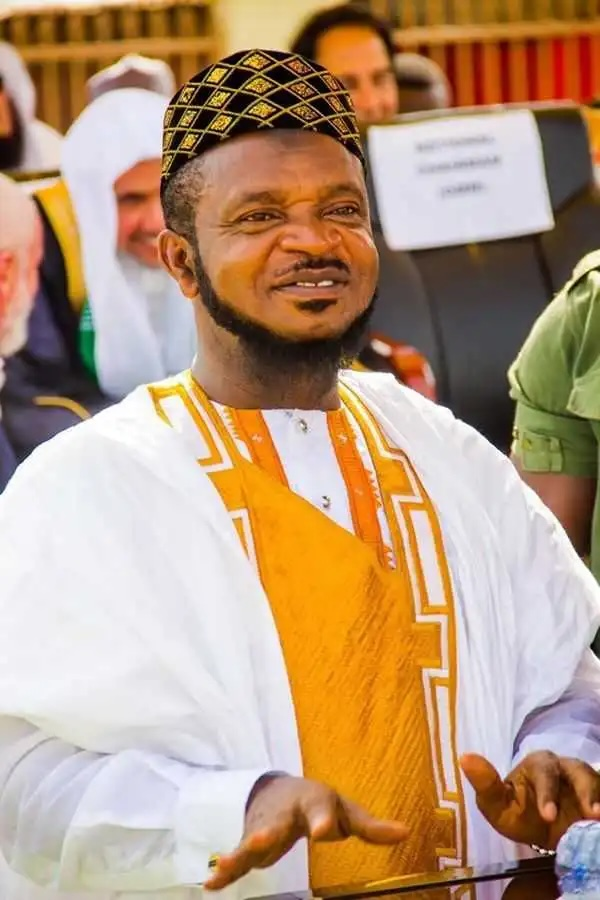
- Sheikh Dr. Amin Bonsu

Personal life
- Born: Amin Mohammed Osei Bonsu; 1959 (age 66–67) Ghana
- Known for: Religious leadership Advocacy for Islamic education Promotion of interfaith harmony
- Occupation: Islamic cleric National Chairman, Ghana Muslim Mission; CEO, Amen Scientific Herbal and Alternative Medical Hospital

Religious life
- Religion: Islam

Amin Bonsu is a Ghanaian Islamic cleric, scholar, and alternative medicine practitioner. He serves as the National Chairman of the Ghana Muslim Mission, where he has been active in promoting Islamic education, interfaith harmony, and community development. He is also the founder of Amen Scientific Herbal and Alternative Medical Hospital, an institution operating within Ghana's alternative healthcare sector.

== Religious leadership ==
=== Advocacy and interfaith harmony ===
In February 2015, during a national debate on the hijab in schools, Sheikh Bonsu emphasized the Quranic principle that there should be "no compulsion in religion," calling for tolerance and respect for the rights of Muslim students.

=== Community development initiatives ===
Under his chairmanship, the Ghana Muslim Mission has expanded educational and social infrastructure, including schools, mosques, health facilities, and boreholes.

=== Environmental advocacy ===
Bonsu has been vocal about environmental protection, particularly regarding the dangers posed by illegal mining (galamsey). In 2017, he warned that Ghana risked severe water scarcity if galamsey activities were not stopped. At the Mission's 2024 national conference, he proposed integrating academic institutions into the national effort to combat illegal mining, advocating research-based approaches to environmental sustainability.

=== Moral guidance and civic responsibility ===
In the lead-up to Ghana's 2020 general elections, he appealed for peace before, during, and after the polls, urging citizens, especially the youth, to refrain from acts that could destabilise national harmony.

== Amen Scientific Herbal and Alternative Medical Hospital ==
In 1996, Bonsu established the Amen Scientific Herbal and Alternative Medical Hospital, a facility specializing in herbal and alternative therapies. The hospital offers treatments based on African traditional medicine alongside modern medical approaches, and operates multiple branches across Ghana.

=== COVID-19 Pandemic ===
During the COVID-19 pandemic in Ghana, Bonsu called on the government to act decisively in its public-health response and encouraged citizens to follow hygiene measures.

== Recognition ==
- African Traditional Medicine Award, 2017.
- Business Leader in Herbal Medicine, China-Africa Chamber of Commerce, 2019.

== Controversy ==
In 2023, Bonsu faced public criticism after stating in an interview that music was a waste of time and that business-minded individuals do not listen to music. His comments drew backlash from entertainment executive Ernest Kwesi Ennin, who described the statements as disrespectful to Ghanaian musicians and called on him to apologize.
