= Qazi Muhammad Amin Ahmed =

Pakistani judge of the Supreme Court (1957–2023)

Justice Qazi Muhammad Amin Ahmed

Judge of the Supreme Court of Pakistan
- In office 24 April 2019 – 25 March 2022
- Appointed by: Arif Alvi

Judge of the Lahore High Court
- In office 7 November 2014 – 24 April 2019

Personal details
- Born: 26 March 1957 Chakwal, Punjab, Pakistan
- Died: 21 June 2023 (aged 66) Rawalpindi, Punjab, Pakistan
- Education: University Law College, Lahore; University of Amsterdam; Institute of Social Studies, The Hague

Qazi Muhammad Amin Ahmed (26 March 1957 – 21 June 2023) was a Pakistani jurist who served as a judge of the Supreme Court of Pakistan from 2019 to 2022. He had earlier served on the Lahore High Court and held various legal and academic positions throughout his career.

== Early life and education ==
Qazi Muhammad Amin Ahmed was born in Chakwal, Punjab, on 26 March 1957. He received his law degree from the University Law College, Lahore in 1980.

== Career ==
Qazi Muhammad Amin Ahmed began practicing law in 1986 and was enrolled as an advocate of the Supreme Court of Pakistan in 1997. He taught law at the International Islamic University, Islamabad from 1986 to 1991 and served as a member of the Punjab Bar Council between 2000 and 2004. In 2007, he was appointed as the Additional Advocate General for Punjab.

He was elevated to the Lahore High Court as a judge in November 2014. On 24 April 2019, he was appointed as a judge of the Supreme Court of Pakistan, where he served until his retirement on 25 March 2022.

== Death ==
Qazi Muhammad Amin Ahmed died of a heart attack on 21 June 2023 in Rawalpindi at the age of 66. His funeral was held in Bahria Town.
