= Jérôme Courtailler =

French Islamist

Jérôme Courtailler is a French radical Islamic activist convicted of belonging to a terrorist organization.

== Travel ==
Courtailler later traveled first to Peshawar, Pakistan, and later attended an Afghan training camp, and is believed to have played a role in supplying the forged documents to the two men who assassinated Ahmed Shah Massoud in September 2001.

Upon returning to France, he was placed on the CIA terrorist watchlist. The French police were alerted of this after he was arrested for shoplifting a pair of shoes in Calvados, France.

== Life ==
Courtailler grew up in an Alpine town. His father was a butcher who went bankrupt, divorced his mother, and moved to work in a meatpacking plant far away. He was raised Roman Catholic, and when to a Catholic school. He became addicted to drugs before converting to Islam at a Brighton mosque in 1996. Shortly thereafter he stayed in Zacarias Moussaoui's apartment, and afterwards travelled to an Al Qaeda's Khalden training camp in Afghanistan.

== Conviction for militant links and embassy plot ==
Courtailler was held in the Netherlands, suspected of attempting to blow up the U.S. Embassy in France. In 2002 the case was dismissed since information was obtained from illegally obtained wiretaps, however in 2004 following an appeal he was convicted in absentia of belonging to a terrorist organization and sentenced to six years in prison. He turned himself in shortly thereafter.
