= Amin Homaei =

Amin Homaei (Persian: امین همایی) was born in Sirjan, Kerman, and is an Iranian musician. He started playing the piano at the age of 17. Trial and error was the path he chose to learn music, a path that continues to this day for him. Traditional Iranian music had a profound influence on him, an influence that is still evident in his works. He considers himself more of a tanbur player than a pianist. Amin worked on his organs. Spring Blossoms is his first recorded album, released on May 1, 2019. He has collaborated with Vahid Taj and Salar Aghili...

== Early life ==
After graduating from Farabi High School, Homaei became a railway worker. He started playing music when he was 18 years old. His first instrument was the piano. He worked mainly in his father's factories until 2017, and subsequently became a musical composer.

== Career ==
Homaei recorded and released the album Spring Blossoms on January 3, 2019. He recorded the album in collaboration with the National Symphony Orchestra of Ukraine (Volodymyr Sirenko) and the Kurdo Choir.

Homaei released his second album, Dance on the Moon, with the same orchestra on May 1, 2019. He collaborated with traditional Iranian musician Vahid in the souvenir piece. The composition was released in April 2022.

Homaei's album Before Autumn After Autumn with Omid Nemati was released in November 2020. Other recorded albums of his include Rafteri with Salar Aghili (January 2021), and Ey Sanam with Mohammad Reza Niazi on his poems was recorded in January 2021.

Another one of his albums is Symphony in C Minor.

Homaei has been a participant in the Fajr International Music Festival.
