= Musa Nur Amin =

Somali politician

Musa Nur Amin is a Somali politician who served in the Transitional Federal Parliament during the 2000s. On 5 January 2008, he was appointed Somalia's Minister of Internal Affairs, placing him in command of the Somali Police Force. In the 1980s, Amin was the director-general/permanent secretary of the Ministry of Marine Transport and Ports. In the late 1990s and early 2000s, he was the secretary-general of the United Somali Congress, a prominent rebel group.

In 2008, Amin and his convoy were attacked by forces of the Islamic Courts Union on the road between Wanlaweyn and Burhakaba.
