= Amine Amamou =

Moroccan footballer

Personal information
- Date of birth: April 20, 1987 (age 39)
- Place of birth: Marrakesh, Morocco
- Height: 1.83 m (6 ft 0 in)
- Position: Forward

Team information
- Current team: Kawkab Marrakech

Youth career
- ?–2007: Kawkab Marrakech

Senior career*
Years	Team	Apps	(Gls)
2007–	Kawkab Marrakech	14	(1)
- * Club domestic league appearances and goals as of April 16, 2009

Amine Amamou is a Moroccan footballer who plays as a forward. Amamou is currently attached to Kawkab Marrakech.
