= Amin Hassan Omar Abdullah =

Sudanese politician (born 1951)

- أمين حسن عمر عبد الله

Minister for Culture, Youth and Sports
- In office 2009–2011

Personal details
- Born: November 6, 1951 (age 74) Al-Ubayyid, Kurdufan, Anglo-Egyptian Sudan
- Education: University of Khartoum; University of Missouri

Amin Hassan Omar Abdullah (born 6 November 1951) (Arabic: أمين حسن عمر عبد الله) was the Minister of State at the Ministry of Culture, Youth and Sports in Sudan. Whilst serving in this post, Abdullah served as the Government of Sudan's Chief negotiator for the Doha Document for Peace in Darfur (DDPD).

== Early life ==
Amin Hassan Omar Abdullah was born on 6 November 1951, in White City in western Sudan and received his university education at the University of Khartoum from 1971 to 1975 School of Political Sciences. He earned a Ph.D. in political science from the University of Missouri in the United States.

== Career ==
He was a public relations officer for a private company, director of the Office of the Attorney General, Journal of Arabia (press release), deputy editor – the managing editor (Banner), director of Research Center for Social Studies – Khartoum, the secretary general of Ministry of Culture and Information, press counselor to the president of the Republic, at the same time chairman of the board, in the era of National Rescue work and Minister of State, Ministry of Culture and Information, chairman of the board and chairman of the editorial board Casablanca national flags, chairman, National Authority for Television, chairman of the board of directors of communication technology, chairman of the board of directors of telephones to call automation, director general of the Sudanese Radio and Television.
