= Sultan Muhammad =

Sultan Muhammad may refer to:

== People ==
- Sultan Muhammad II ibn Mahmud (1128–1159), sultan of the Seljuq Empire, 1153–1159
- Prince Sultan Muhammad, governor of Derbent under Shirvanshah Keykubad I
- Sultan Muhammad Shah Tughluq, ruler of the Muslim Tughlaq dynasty, 1390–1394
- Sultan Muhammad (Badakhshan), 15th-century ruler of Badakhshan
- Sultan Muhammad (died c. 1451), Timurid ruler of Persia and Fars, c. 1447 – c. 1451
- Sultan Muhammad Jiwa Zainal Adilin I, 9th sultan of Kedah, 1472–1506
- Sultan Muhammad Thakurufaanu Al Auzam (died 1585), sultan of the Maldives, 1573–1585
- Sultan Muhammad Hassan, 10th sultan of Brunei, 1582–1598
- Sultan Muhammad Qutb Shah, ruled Golconda under the Qutb Shahi dynasty, 1611–1625
- Sultan Muhammad Kudarat (1581–1671), sultan of Maguindanao in the Philippines, 1619–1671
- Sultan Muhammad Ali (Brunei), 13th sultan of Brunei, 1660
- Sultan Muhammad Akbar (1657–1706), son of the Mughal emperor Aurangzeb
- Sultan Muhammad Jiwa Zainal Adilin II, 19th sultan of Kedah, 1710–1778
- Sultan Muhammad Shamsuddeen II, sultan of the Maldives, 1773–1774
- Sultan Muhammad Mu'iz ud-din, sultan of the Maldives, 1774–1779
- Sultan Muhammad Mueenuddeen I, sultan of the Maldives, 1798–1835
- Sultan Mohammad Khan (1795–1861), governor of Peshawar, 1828–1834
- Sultan Muhammad Imaaduddeen IV, sultan of the Maldives, 1835–1882
- Aga Sir Sultan Muhammad Shah (1877–1957), 48th Imam of the Nizari Ismaili community
- Sultan Muhammad Shamsuddeen Iskander III, CMG (1879–1945), sultan of the Maldives, 1893 and 1902–1934
- Sultan Muhammad Jamalul Alam II (1889–1924), 26th sultan of Brunei Darussalam, 1906–1924
- Sultan Muhammad Khan Golden, Pakistani car and motorcycle stuntman
- Sultan Muhammad Faris Petra (born 1969), sultan of Kelantan, Malaysia
- Sultan Muhammad Kaharuddin III (1902–1975), sultan of Sumbawa

=== Ottoman sultans ===
- Sultan Muhammad I (1381–1421), Mehmed I, reigned 1413–1421
- Sultan Muhammad II (1432–1481), Mehmed the Conqueror, reigned 1444–1446 and 1451–1481
- Sultan Muhammad III (1566–1603), Mehmed III, reigned 1595–1603
- Sultan Muhammad IV (1642–1693), Mehmed IV, reigned 1648–1687
- Sultan Muhammad V (1844–1918), Mehmed V, reigned 1909–1918
- Sultan Muhammad VI (1861–1926), Mehmed VI, reigned 1918–1922

== Places ==
- Sultan Muhammad IV Stadium, stadium in Kota Bharu, Kelantan, Malaysia
- Sultan Muhammad Kaharuddin III Airport, in Sumbawa Besar, West Nusa Tenggara, Indonesia
- Sultan Muhammad Salahudin Airport, on Sumbawa Island, West Nusa Tenggara, Indonesia

== Other ==
- Sultan Mohammed, 16th-century artist of Persian miniatures.
- Fatih Sultan Muhammad, 1983 Turkish animated film about the fall of Constantinople to Sultan Muhammad II

== See also ==
- Muhammad Shah (disambiguation)
- Sultan Mahmud (disambiguation)
- Sultan Muhammad Shah (disambiguation)
- Mohammed I (disambiguation)
- Mohammed II (disambiguation)
