= Guranabad (disambiguation) =

Guranabad is a village in West Azerbaijan Province, Iran.

Guranabad (Persian: گوران اباد) may also refer to:

- Guranabad-e Pashai
- Guranabad-e Qazi
- Guranabad-e Qazzaq
