= Kani Bardeh =

Kani Bardeh كاني برده
- Village
- Country: Iran
- Province: West Azerbaijan
- County: Naqadeh
- Bakhsh: Central
- Rural District: Beygom Qaleh

Population (2006)
  - Total: 39
- Time zone: UTC+3:30 (IRST)
  - Summer (DST): UTC+4:30 (IRDT)

Kani Bardeh (Persian: كاني برده, also Romanized as Kānī Bardeh; also known as Ḩoseyn Āvā) is a village in Beygom Qaleh Rural District, in the Central District of Naqadeh County, West Azerbaijan Province, Iran. At the 2006 census, its population was 39, in 7 families.
