= Kani Mam Seyyed =

Kani Mam Seyyed كاني مام سيد
- Village
- Country: Iran
- Province: West Azerbaijan
- County: Naqadeh
- Bakhsh: Central
- Rural District: Beygom Qaleh

Population (2006)
  - Total: 236
- Time zone: UTC+3:30 (IRST)
  - Summer (DST): UTC+4:30 (IRDT)

Kani Mam Seyyed (Persian: كاني مام سيد, also Romanized as Kānī Mām Seyyed; also known as Kapaklū) is a village in Beygom Qaleh Rural District, in the Central District of Naqadeh County, West Azerbaijan Province, Iran. At the 2006 census, its population was 236, in 42 families.
