= Alaguz-e Olya =

Alaguz-e Olya الاگوزعليا
- Village
- Location within Iran
- Coordinates: 36°59′50″N 45°18′34″E
- Country: Iran
- Province: West Azerbaijan
- County: Naqadeh
- Bakhsh: Central
- Rural District: Solduz

Population (2006)
  - Total: 178
- Time zone: UTC+3:30 (IRST)
  - Summer (DST): UTC+4:30 (IRDT)

Alaguz-e Olya (Persian: الاگوزعليا, also Romanized as Ālāgūz-e ‘Olyā; also known as Ālāgūz) is a village in Solduz Rural District, in the Central District of Naqadeh County, West Azerbaijan Province, Iran. At the 2006 census, its population was 178, in 43 families.
