= Bachanlu =

Bachanlu بچنلو
- Village
- Location within Iran
- Coordinates: 36°59′13″N 45°21′30″E
- Country: Iran
- Province: West Azerbaijan
- County: Naqadeh
- Bakhsh: Central
- Rural District: Solduz

Population (2006)
  - Total: 21
- Time zone: UTC+3:30 (IRST)
  - Summer (DST): UTC+4:30 (IRDT)

Bachanlu (Persian: بچنلو, also Romanized as Bachanlū) is a village in Solduz Rural District, in the Central District of Naqadeh County, West Azerbaijan Province, Iran. At the 2006 census, its population was 21, in 4 families.
