= Chaqal-e Mostafa =

Chaqal-e Mostafa چقال مصطفي
- Village
- Location within Iran
- Coordinates: 36°54′50″N 45°33′51″E
- Country: Iran
- Province: West Azerbaijan
- County: Naqadeh
- Bakhsh: Central
- Rural District: Beygom Qaleh

Population (2006)
  - Total: 379
- Time zone: UTC+3:30 (IRST)
  - Summer (DST): UTC+4:30 (IRDT)

Chaqal-e Mostafa (Persian: چقال مصطفي, also Romanized as Chaqāl-e Moşţafá) is a village in Beygom Qaleh Rural District, in the Central District of Naqadeh County, West Azerbaijan Province, Iran. At the 2006 census, its population was 379, in 71 families.
