= Sakhasi Tappeh =

Sakhasi Tappeh ساخسی‌تپه
- Village
- Location within Iran
- Coordinates: 36°56′14″N 45°30′29″E
- Country: Iran
- Province: West Azerbaijan
- County: Naqadeh
- Bakhsh: Central
- Rural District: Beygom Qaleh

Population (2006)
  - Total: 259
- Time zone: UTC+3:30 (IRST)
  - Summer (DST): UTC+4:30 (IRDT)

Sakhasi Tappeh (Persian: ساخسی‌تپه, also Romanized as Sākhasī Tappeh) is a village in Beygom Qaleh Rural District, in the Central District of Naqadeh County, West Azerbaijan Province, Iran. At the 2006 census, its population was 259, in 57 families.
