= Ali Malek =

Ali Malek علي ملك
- Village
- Location within Iran
- Coordinates: 36°58′22″N 45°21′25″E
- Country: Iran
- Province: West Azerbaijan
- County: Naqadeh
- Bakhsh: Central
- Rural District: Solduz

Population (2006)
  - Total: 231
- Time zone: UTC+3:30 (IRST)
  - Summer (DST): UTC+4:30 (IRDT)

Ali Malek (Persian: علي ملك, also Romanized as ‘Ālī Malek; Alīmalek, and ‘Alī Molk) is a village in Solduz Rural District, in the Central District of Naqadeh County, West Azerbaijan Province, Iran. At the 2006 census, its population was 231, in 55 families.
