= Zelilan =

Zelilan ذليلان
- Village
- Location within Iran
- Coordinates: 36°59′43″N 45°16′27″E
- Country: Iran
- Province: West Azerbaijan
- County: Naqadeh
- Bakhsh: Central
- Rural District: Solduz

Population (2006)
  - Total: 224
- Time zone: UTC+3:30 (IRST)
  - Summer (DST): UTC+4:30 (IRDT)

Zelilan (Persian: ذليلان, also Romanized as Z̄elīlān; also known as Zelīān) is a village in Solduz Rural District, in the Central District of Naqadeh County, West Azerbaijan Province, Iran. At the 2006 census, its population was 224, in 40 families.
