= Rah Daneh =

Village in West Azerbaijan province, Iran

Rah Daneh Persian: راهدانه
- Village
- Location within Iran
- Coordinates: 36°58′22″N 45°28′56″E
- Country: Iran
- Province: West Azerbaijan
- County: Naqadeh
- District: Central
- Rural District: Beygom Qaleh

Population (2016)
  - Total: 619
- Time zone: UTC+3:30 (IRST)

Rah Daneh (Persian: راهدانه) (Note: Also romanized as Rāh Dāneh; also known as Rāh Dahaneh; in Armenian: Ռահդանա or Րախտանէ) is a village in Beygom Qaleh Rural District of the Central District in Naqadeh County, West Azerbaijan province, Iran.

== History ==
During the Qajar and Pahlavi period, Ahmad Ali Zeynali (Ahmed Bey) from the Heydar Khan family was the owner and ruler in this region. Ahmad Bey Zeynali, one of the Turks of Qara-Papakh, was the biggest Big Sulduz.

== Demographics ==
=== Population ===
At the time of the 2006 National Census, the village's population was 681 in 177 households. The following census in 2011 counted 590 people in 177 households. The 2016 census measured the population of the village as 619 people in 198 households.

== Notable people ==
Morteza Razavi, Iranian cleric
