= Sheykh Maruf =

Sheykh Maruf شيخ معروف
- Village
- Location within Iran
- Coordinates: 36°55′19″N 45°35′29″E
- Country: Iran
- Province: West Azerbaijan
- County: Naqadeh
- Bakhsh: Central
- Rural District: Beygom Qaleh

Population (2006)
  - Total: 238
- Time zone: UTC+3:30 (IRST)
  - Summer (DST): UTC+4:30 (IRDT)

Sheykh Maruf (Persian: شيخ معروف, also Romanized as Sheykh Ma‘rūf) is a village in Beygom Qaleh Rural District, in the Central District of Naqadeh County, West Azerbaijan Province, Iran. At the 2006 census, its population was 238, in 48 families.
