= Tupuzabad =

Tupuzabad (Persian: توپوزاباد) may refer to:

- Tupuzabad, Naqadeh
- Tupuzabad, Urmia
- Tupuzabad, Silvaneh, Urmia County
