= Shah Muhammad =

Shah Muhammad or Shah Mohammad may refer to:

== People ==
- Shah Muhammad Sagir, Muslim Bengali poet during the reign of Ghiyasuddin Azam Shah, 1390–1411
- Shah Mohammad (1780–1862), Punjabi poet best known for Jangnama
- Shah Muhammad Sulaiman (1886–1941), Chief Justice of the Allahabad High Court, 1932–1937
- Shah Muhammad Rais (born 1954), subject of Åsne Seierstad's book The Bookseller of Kabul
- Sha Mohammed Alikhel (born 1981), Pakistani baker held in Guantanamo Bay 2001–2003
- Shah Muhammad Khan, Pakistani politician
- Shah Muhammad Kara Koyunlu - Kara Koyunlu prince, governor of Baghdad

== Places ==
- Shah Mohammad Qasemi, village in Hirmand County, Sistan and Baluchestan Province, Iran
- Shāh Moḩammad or Shirdel Sadak, village in Hirmand County, Sistan and Baluchestan Province, Iran

== See also ==
- Muhammad Shah (disambiguation)
- Sultan Muhammad Shah (disambiguation)
