= Sharif ol Din =

Sharif ol Din شريف الدين
- Village
- Location within Iran
- Coordinates: 36°56′58″N 45°28′39″E
- Country: Iran
- Province: West Azerbaijan
- County: Naqadeh
- Bakhsh: Central
- Rural District: Beygom Qaleh

Population (2006)
  - Total: 90
- Time zone: UTC+3:30 (IRST)
  - Summer (DST): UTC+4:30 (IRDT)

Sharif ol Din (Persian: شريف الدين, also Romanized as Sharīf ol Dīn and Sharīf od Dīn) is a village in Beygom Qaleh Rural District. It is located in the Central District of the Naqadeh County, West Azerbaijan Province, Iran. At the 2006 census, its population was 90, in 20 families.
