= Daymav =

Daymav دايماو
- Village
- Location within Iran
- Coordinates: 36°50′00″N 45°33′40″E
- Country: Iran
- Province: West Azerbaijan
- County: Naqadeh
- Bakhsh: Central
- Rural District: Beygom Qaleh

Population (2006)
  - Total: 457
- Time zone: UTC+3:30 (IRST)
  - Summer (DST): UTC+4:30 (IRDT)

Daymav (Persian: دايماو, also Romanized as Dāymāv; also known as Da’em Ab and Dāymāb) is a village in Beygom Qaleh Rural District, in the Central District of Naqadeh County, West Azerbaijan Province, Iran. At the 2006 census, its population was 457, in 75 families.
