= Lavashlu =

Lavashlu لواشلو
- Village
- Location within Iran
- Coordinates: 36°59′36″N 45°21′33″E
- Country: Iran
- Province: West Azerbaijan
- County: Naqadeh
- Bakhsh: Central
- Rural District: Solduz

Population (2006)
  - Total: 96
- Time zone: UTC+3:30 (IRST)
  - Summer (DST): UTC+4:30 (IRDT)

Lavashlu (Persian: لواشلو, also Romanized as Lavāshlū) is a village in Solduz Rural District, in the Central District of Naqadeh County, West Azerbaijan Province, Iran. At the 2006 census, its population was 96, in 23 families.
