= Pih Jik =

Pih Jik پيه جيك
- Village
- Location within Iran
- Coordinates: 36°58′48″N 45°16′58″E
- Country: Iran
- Province: West Azerbaijan
- County: Naqadeh
- Bakhsh: Central
- Rural District: Solduz

Population (2006)
  - Total: 24
- Time zone: UTC+3:30 (IRST)
  - Summer (DST): UTC+4:30 (IRDT)

Pih Jik (Persian: پيه جيك, also Romanized as Pīh Jīk; also known as Pīh Chīk) is a village in Solduz Rural District, in the Central District of Naqadeh County, West Azerbaijan Province, Iran. At the 2006 census, its population was 24, in 7 families.
