= Masueh =

Village in West Azerbaijan province, Iran

Masueh Persian: ماسوه
- Village
- Location within Iran
- Coordinates: 36°48′17″N 45°33′47″E
- Country: Iran
- Province: West Azerbaijan
- County: Naqadeh
- District: Central
- Rural District: Beygom Qaleh

Population (2016)
  - Total: 609
- Time zone: UTC+3:30 (IRST)

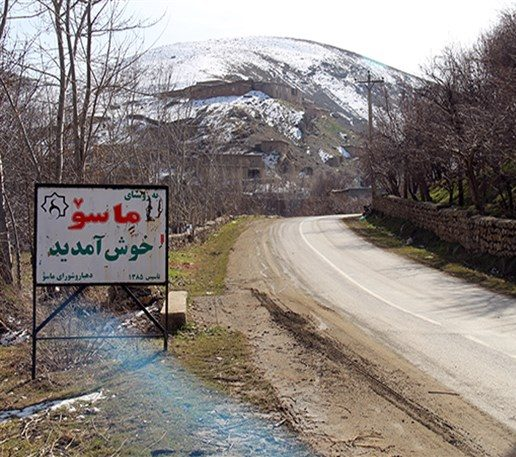

Masueh (Persian: ماسوه) (Note: Also romanized as Māsūeh; also known as Māsū) is a village in Beygom Qaleh Rural District of the Central District in Naqadeh County, West Azerbaijan province, Iran.

== Demographics ==
=== Population ===
At the time of the 2006 National Census, the village's population was 682 in 102 households. The following census in 2011 counted 750 people in 171 households. The 2016 census measured the population of the village as 609 people in 147 households.
