= Ja Shiran =

Village in West Azerbaijan province, Iran

Ja Shiran Persian: جاشيران
- Village
- Location within Iran
- Coordinates: 36°59′28″N 45°15′10″E
- Country: Iran
- Province: West Azerbaijan
- County: Naqadeh
- District: Central
- Rural District: Solduz

Population (2016)
  - Total: 306
- Time zone: UTC+3:30 (IRST)

Ja Shiran (Persian: جاشيران) (Note: Also romanized as Ja Shīrān) is a village in Solduz Rural District of the Central District in Naqadeh County, West Azerbaijan province, Iran.

== Demographics ==
=== Ethnicity ===
The village is populated by Sunni Kurds and Shia Azerbaijanis.

=== Population ===
At the time of the 2006 National Census, the village's population was 350 in 58 households. The following census in 2011 counted 334 people in 92 households. The 2016 census measured the population of the village as 306 people in 90 households.
