= Guranabad-e Qazi =

Guranabad-e Qazi گوران ابادقاضي
- Village
- Location within Iran
- Coordinates: 36°58′12″N 45°19′48″E
- Country: Iran
- Province: West Azerbaijan
- County: Naqadeh
- Bakhsh: Central
- Rural District: Solduz

Population (2006)
  - Total: 114
- Time zone: UTC+3:30 (IRST)
  - Summer (DST): UTC+4:30 (IRDT)

Guranabad-e Qazi (Persian: گوران ابادقاضي, also Romanized as Gūrānābād-e Qāẕī) is a village in Solduz Rural District, in the Central District of Naqadeh County, West Azerbaijan Province, Iran. At the 2006 census, its population was 114, in 28 families.
