= Mirabad, Naqadeh =

Village in West Azerbaijan province, Iran

Mirabad Persian: ميراباد
- Village
- Location within Iran
- Coordinates: 36°59′10″N 45°18′48″E
- Country: Iran
- Province: West Azerbaijan
- County: Naqadeh
- District: Central
- Rural District: Solduz

Population (2016)
  - Total: 258
- Time zone: UTC+3:30 (IRST)

Mirabad (Persian: ميراباد) (Note: Also romanized as Mīrābād) is a village in, and the capital of, Solduz Rural District in the Central District of Naqadeh County, West Azerbaijan province, Iran.

== Demographics ==
=== Population ===
At the time of the 2006 National Census, the village's population was 345 in 72 households. The following census in 2011 counted 336 people in 107 households. The 2016 census measured the population of the village as 258 people in 79 households.
