= Shahid Mohammad Rauf =

Shahid Mohammad Rauf شهيدمحمدرئوف
- Village
- Location within Iran
- Coordinates: 36°52′00″N 45°34′00″E
- Country: Iran
- Province: West Azerbaijan
- County: Naqadeh
- Bakhsh: Central
- Rural District: Beygom Qaleh

Population (2006)
  - Total: 410
- Time zone: UTC+3:30 (IRST)
  - Summer (DST): UTC+4:30 (IRDT)

Shahid Mohammad Rauf (Persian: شهيدمحمدرئوف, also Romanized as Shahīd Moḩammad Ra’ūf; also known as Moḩammad Shāh-e ‘Olyā) is a village in Beygom Qaleh Rural District, in the Central District of Naqadeh County, West Azerbaijan Province, Iran. At the 2006 census, its population was 410, in 71 families.
