= Khalifehlu, West Azerbaijan =

Village in West Azerbaijan province, Iran

Khalifehlu Persian: خليفه لو
- Village
- Location within Iran
- Coordinates: 36°55′54″N 45°34′17″E
- Country: Iran
- Province: West Azerbaijan
- County: Naqadeh
- District: Central
- Rural District: Beygom Qaleh

Population (2016)
  - Total: 800
- Time zone: UTC+3:30 (IRST)

Khalifehlu (Persian: خليفه لو) (Note: Also romanized as Khalīfehlū) is a village in Beygom Qaleh Rural District of the Central District in Naqadeh County, West Azerbaijan province, Iran.

== Demographics ==
=== Population ===
At the time of the 2006 National Census, the village's population was 741 in 131 households. The following census in 2011 counted 820 people in 234 households. The 2016 census measured the population of the village as 800 people in 236 households.
