= Kuzehgaran, West Azerbaijan =

Village in West Azerbaijan province, Iran

Kuzehgaran Persian: كوزه گران
- Village
- Location within Iran
- Coordinates: 36°56′28″N 45°24′24″E
- Country: Iran
- Province: West Azerbaijan
- County: Naqadeh
- District: Central
- Rural District: Beygom Qaleh

Population (2016)
  - Total: 736
- Time zone: UTC+3:30 (IRST)

Kuzehgaran (Persian: كوزه گران) (Note: Also romanized as Kūzehgarān) is a village in Beygom Qaleh Rural District of the Central District in Naqadeh County, West Azerbaijan province, Iran.

== Demographics ==
=== Population ===
At the time of the 2006 National Census, the village's population was 603 in 142 households. The following census in 2011 counted 615 people in 179 households. The 2016 census measured the population of the village as 736 people in 208 households.
