= Gurkhaneh, West Azerbaijan =

Gurkhaneh گورخانه
- Village
- Location within Iran
- Coordinates: 36°55′26″N 45°34′29″E
- Country: Iran
- Province: West Azerbaijan
- County: Naqadeh
- Bakhsh: Central
- Rural District: Beygom Qaleh

Population (2006)
  - Total: 51
- Time zone: UTC+3:30 (IRST)
  - Summer (DST): UTC+4:30 (IRDT)

Gurkhaneh (Persian: گورخانه, also Romanized as Gūrkhāneh; also known as Kūrkhāneh) is a village in Beygom Qaleh Rural District, in the Central District of Naqadeh County, West Azerbaijan Province, Iran. At the 2006 census, its population was 51, in 15 families.
