= Shaveleh =

Village in West Azerbaijan province, Iran

Shaveleh Persian: شاوله
- Village
- Location within Iran
- Coordinates: 36°51′09″N 45°22′52″E
- Country: Iran
- Province: West Azerbaijan
- County: Naqadeh
- District: Central
- Rural District: Beygom Qaleh

Population (2016)
  - Total: 618
- Time zone: UTC+3:30 (IRST)

Shaveleh (Persian: شاوله) (Note: Also romanized as Shāvaleh, Shāveleh, and Shavleh) is a village in Beygom Qaleh Rural District of the Central District in Naqadeh County, West Azerbaijan province, Iran.

== Demographics ==
=== Population ===
At the time of the 2006 National Census, the village's population was 785 in 129 households. The following census in 2011 counted 674 people in 177 households. The 2016 census measured the population of the village as 618 people in 157 households.
