= Guranabad-e Qazzaq =

Guranabad-e Qazzaq گوران ابادقزاق
- Village
- Location within Iran
- Coordinates: 36°57′54″N 45°19′17″E
- Country: Iran
- Province: West Azerbaijan
- County: Naqadeh
- Bakhsh: Central
- Rural District: Solduz

Population (2006)
  - Total: 127
- Time zone: UTC+3:30 (IRST)
  - Summer (DST): UTC+4:30 (IRDT)

Guranabad-e Qazzaq (Persian: گوران ابادقزاق, also Romanized as Gūrānābād-e Qazzāq) is a village in Solduz Rural District, in the Central District of Naqadeh County, West Azerbaijan Province, Iran. At the 2006 census, its population was 127, in 26 families.
