= Khalkhaneh =

Village in West Azerbaijan province, Iran

Khalkhaneh Persian: خلخانه
- Village
- Location within Iran
- Coordinates: 37°00′01″N 45°20′24″E
- Country: Iran
- Province: West Azerbaijan
- County: Naqadeh
- District: Central
- Rural District: Solduz

Population (2016)
  - Total: 371
- Time zone: UTC+3:30 (IRST)

Khalkhaneh (Persian: خلخانه) (Note: Also romanized as Khal Khāneh, Khalkhāneh, and Khel Khāneh; formerly known as Khankhaneh (خنخنه)) is a village in Solduz Rural District of the Central District in Naqadeh County, West Azerbaijan province, Iran.

== Demographics ==
=== Population ===
At the time of the 2006 National Census, the village's population, as Khankhaneh, was 399 in 82 households. The following census in 2011 counted 393 people in 99 households, by which time the village's name was listed as Khalkhaneh. The 2016 census measured the population of the village as 371 people in 95 households.
