= Bayezava =

Bayezava بايزاوا
- Village
- Location within Iran
- Coordinates: 36°52′20″N 45°20′19″E
- Country: Iran
- Province: West Azerbaijan
- County: Naqadeh
- Bakhsh: Central
- Rural District: Beygom Qaleh

Population (2006)
  - Total: 58
- Time zone: UTC+3:30 (IRST)
  - Summer (DST): UTC+4:30 (IRDT)

Bayezava (Persian: بايزاوا, also Romanized as Bāyezāvā; also known as Bāyezīdābād and Beyẕābād) is a village in Beygom Qaleh Rural District, in the Central District of Naqadeh County, West Azerbaijan Province, Iran. At the 2006 census, its population was 58, in 11 families.
