= Beygom Qaleh =

Village in West Azerbaijan province, Iran

Beygom Qaleh Persian: بيگمقلعه
- Village
- Location within Iran
- Coordinates: 36°55′52″N 45°28′15″E
- Country: Iran
- Province: West Azerbaijan
- County: Naqadeh
- District: Central
- Rural District: Beygom Qaleh

Population (2016)
  - Total: 1,727
- Time zone: UTC+3:30 (IRST)

Beygom Qaleh (Persian: بيگمقلعه) (Note: Also romanized as Beygom Qal‘eh; also known as Bāim Qal‘eh, Beygūm Qal‘eh, and Bīm Qal‘eh) is a village in, and the capital of, Beygom Qaleh Rural District in the Central District of Naqadeh County, West Azerbaijan province, Iran.

== Demographics ==
=== Population ===
At the time of the 2006 National Census, the village's population was 1,661 in 384 households. The following census in 2011 counted 1,680 people in 495 households. The 2016 census measured the population of the village as 1,727 people in 497 households. It was the most populous village in its rural district.
