= Dasht-e Qureh =

Village in West Azerbaijan province, Iran

Dasht-e Qureh Persian: دشت قوره
- Village
- Location within Iran
- Coordinates: 36°50′45″N 45°26′15″E
- Country: Iran
- Province: West Azerbaijan
- County: Naqadeh
- District: Central
- Rural District: Beygom Qaleh

Population (2016)
  - Total: 528
- Time zone: UTC+3:30 (IRST)

Dasht-e Qureh (Persian: دشت قوره) (Note: Also romanized as Dasht-e Qūreh; also known as Dasht Qūrī and Dasht-e Qūrī) is a village in Beygom Qaleh Rural District of the Central District in Naqadeh County, West Azerbaijan province, Iran.

== Demographics ==
=== Population ===
At the time of the 2006 National Census, the village's population was 610 in 93 households. The following census in 2011 counted 691 people in 180 households. The 2016 census measured the population of the village as 528 people in 158 households.
