= Karvansara, Naqadeh =

Village in West Azerbaijan province, Iran

Karvansara Persian: كاروانسرا
- Village
- Location within Iran
- Coordinates: 36°57′55″N 45°25′09″E
- Country: Iran
- Province: West Azerbaijan
- County: Naqadeh
- District: Central
- Rural District: Beygom Qaleh

Population (2016)
  - Total: 895
- Time zone: UTC+3:30 (IRST)

Karvansara (Persian: كاروانسرا) (Note: Also romanized as Kārevānsarā and Kārvānserā; in Armenian: Քարվանսառայ) is a village in Beygom Qaleh Rural District of the Central District in Naqadeh County, West Azerbaijan province, Iran.

== Demographics ==
=== Population ===
At the time of the 2006 National Census, the village's population was 741 in 187 households. The following census in 2011 counted 812 people in 228 households. The 2016 census measured the population of the village as 895 people in 261 households.
