= Dilanchi Arkhi =

Dilanchi Arkhi (Persian: ديلان چي ارخي) may refer to:

- Dilanchi Arkhi-ye Olya
- Dilanchi Arkhi-ye Sofla
- Dilanchi-ye Arkhi
