= Guranabad-e Pashai =

Guranabad-e Pashai گوران ابادپاشائي
- Village
- Location within Iran
- Coordinates: 36°58′51″N 45°18′35″E
- Country: Iran
- Province: West Azerbaijan
- County: Naqadeh
- Bakhsh: Central
- Rural District: Solduz

Population (2006)
  - Total: 60
- Time zone: UTC+3:30 (IRST)
  - Summer (DST): UTC+4:30 (IRDT)

Guranabad-e Pashai (Persian: گوران ابادپاشائي, also Romanized as Gūrānābād-e Pāshā'ī; in Armenian: Կէօրնավայ) is a village in Solduz Rural District, in the Central District of Naqadeh County, West Azerbaijan Province, Iran. At the 2006 census, its population was 60, in 17 families.
