= Tazeh Qaleh, Naqadeh =

Village in West Azerbaijan province, Iran

Tazeh Qaleh Persian: تازه قلعه
- Village
- Location within Iran
- Coordinates: 36°57′54″N 45°27′33″E
- Country: Iran
- Province: West Azerbaijan
- County: Naqadeh
- District: Central
- Rural District: Beygom Qaleh

Population (2016)
  - Total: 677
- Time zone: UTC+3:30 (IRST)

Tazeh Qaleh (Persian: تازه قلعه) (Note: Also romanized as Tāzeh Qal‘eh) is a village in Beygom Qaleh Rural District of the Central District in Naqadeh County, West Azerbaijan province, Iran.

== Demographics ==
=== Population ===
At the time of the 2006 National Census, the village's population was 725 in 143 households. The following census in 2011 counted 752 people in 210 households. The 2016 census measured the population of the village as 677 people in 194 households.
