= Gurkhaneh =

Gurkhaneh or Kyurakhane or Qurkhaneh (Persian: گورخانه) may refer to:

- Gurkhaneh, Qazvin
- Gurkhaneh, West Azerbaijan
