= Baliqchi, Iran =

Village in West Azerbaijan province, Iran

Baliqchi Persian: بالیقچی
- Village
- Location within Iran
- Coordinates: 36°55′44″N 45°22′04″E
- Country: Iran
- Province: West Azerbaijan
- County: Naqadeh
- District: Central
- Rural District: Beygom Qaleh

Population (2016)
  - Total: 959
- Time zone: UTC+3:30 (IRST)

Baliqchi (Persian: بالیقچی) (Note: Also romanized as Bālīqchī; also known as Bāleqchī) is a village in Beygom Qaleh Rural District of the Central District in Naqadeh County, West Azerbaijan province, Iran.

== Demographics ==
=== Population ===
At the time of the 2006 National Census, the village's population was 758 in 166 households. The following census in 2011 counted 850 people in 209 households. The 2016 census measured the population of the village as 959 people in 264 households.
