= Beyzabad =

Beyzabad or Bizabad (Persian: بهزاباد) may refer to:

- Beyzabad, Lorestan
- Beyzabad, West Azerbaijan
