= Aliabad, Naqadeh =

Village in West Azerbaijan province, Iran

Aliabad Persian: علي اباد
- Village
- Location within Iran
- Coordinates: 36°57′25″N 45°16′54″E
- Country: Iran
- Province: West Azerbaijan
- County: Naqadeh
- District: Central
- Rural District: Solduz

Population (2016)
  - Total: 421
- Time zone: UTC+3:30 (IRST)

Aliabad (Persian: علي اباد) (Note: Also romanized as ‘Alīābād) is a village in Solduz Rural District of the Central District in Naqadeh County, West Azerbaijan province, Iran.

== Demographics ==
=== Population ===
At the time of the 2006 National Census, the village's population was 411 in 89 households. The following census in 2011 counted 399 people in 108 households. The 2016 census measured the population of the village as 421 people in 117 households.
