= Halabi, Iran =

Village in West Azerbaijan province, Iran

Halabi Persian: حلبي
- Village
- Location within Iran
- Coordinates: 37°04′10″N 45°16′59″E
- Country: Iran
- Province: West Azerbaijan
- County: Naqadeh
- District: Central
- Rural District: Solduz

Population (2016)
  - Total: 432
- Time zone: UTC+3:30 (IRST)

Halabi (Persian: حلبي) (Note: Also romanized as Ḩalabī) is a village in Solduz Rural District of the Central District in Naqadeh County, West Azerbaijan province, Iran.

== Demographics ==
=== Population ===
At the time of the 2006 National Census, the village's population was 454 in 81 households. The following census in 2011 counted 419 people in 122 households. The 2016 census measured the population of the village as 432 people in 109 households.
