= Dizaj-e Bozorg =

Village in West Azerbaijan province, Iran

Dizaj-e Bozorg Persian: ديزج بزرگ
- Village
- Location within Iran
- Coordinates: 36°56′09″N 45°26′11″E
- Country: Iran
- Province: West Azerbaijan
- County: Naqadeh
- District: Central
- Rural District: Beygom Qaleh

Population (2016)
  - Total: 687
- Time zone: UTC+3:30 (IRST)

Dizaj-e Bozorg (Persian: ديزج بزرگ) (Note: Also romanized as Dīzaj-e Bozorg; also known as Dīzaj, Dīzeh, Dīzei, and Dīzej) is a village in Beygom Qaleh Rural District of the Central District in Naqadeh County, West Azerbaijan province, Iran.

== Demographics ==
=== Population ===
At the time of the 2006 National Census, the village's population was 526 in 104 households. The following census in 2011 counted 557 people in 161 households. The 2016 census measured the population of the village as 687 people in 197 households.
