= Mehmandar, West Azerbaijan =

Village in West Azerbaijan province, Iran

Mehmandar Persian: مهماندار
- Village
- Location within Iran
- Coordinates: 36°57′14″N 45°25′54″E
- Country: Iran
- Province: West Azerbaijan
- County: Naqadeh
- District: Central
- Rural District: Beygom Qaleh

Population (2016)
  - Total: 628
- Time zone: UTC+3:30 (IRST)

Mehmandar (Persian: مهماندار) (Note: Also romanized as Mehmāndār) is a village in Beygom Qaleh Rural District of the Central District in Naqadeh County, West Azerbaijan province, Iran.

== Demographics ==
=== Population ===
At the time of the 2006 National Census, the village's population was 592 in 119 households. The following census in 2011 counted 612 people in 162 households. The 2016 census measured the population of the village as 628 people in 174 households.
