= Kuik, West Azerbaijan =

Village in West Azerbaijan province, Iran

Kuik Persian: كويك
- Village
- Location within Iran
- Coordinates: 37°04′57″N 45°17′47″E
- Country: Iran
- Province: West Azerbaijan
- County: Naqadeh
- District: Central
- Rural District: Solduz

Population (2016)
  - Total: 488
- Time zone: UTC+3:30 (IRST)

Kuik (Persian: كويك) (Note: Also romanized as Kū’īk; formerly known as Guik (گوييك), also romanized as Gū’īk) is a village in Solduz Rural District of the Central District in Naqadeh County, West Azerbaijan province, Iran.

== Demographics ==
=== Population ===
At the time of the 2006 National Census, the village's population, as Guik, was 550 in 102 households. The following census in 2011 counted 521 people in 152 households, by which time the village was listed as Kuik. The 2016 census measured the population of the village as 488 people in 129 households.
