= Tupuzabad, Naqadeh =

Village in West Azerbaijan province, Iran

Tupuzabad Persian: توپوز اباد
- Village
- Location within Iran
- Coordinates: 36°57′46″N 45°25′46″E
- Country: Iran
- Province: West Azerbaijan
- County: Naqadeh
- District: Central
- Rural District: Beygom Qaleh

Population (2016)
  - Total: 557
- Time zone: UTC+3:30 (IRST)

Tupuzabad (Persian: توپوز اباد) (Note: Also romanized as Tūpūzābād; also known as Toppozābād; in Armenian: Թօփուզաւա or Թօփչավայ) is a village in Beygom Qaleh Rural District of the Central District in Naqadeh County, West Azerbaijan province, Iran.

== Demographics ==
=== Population ===
At the time of the 2006 National Census, the village's population was 549 in 142 households. The following census in 2011 counted 617 people in 183 households. The 2016 census measured the population of the village as 557 people in 166 households.
