= Qarna =

Village in West Azerbaijan province, Iran

Qarna Persian: قارنا
- Village
- Location within Iran
- Coordinates: 36°55′31″N 45°18′34″E
- Country: Iran
- Province: West Azerbaijan
- County: Naqadeh
- District: Central
- Rural District: Beygom Qaleh

Population (2016)
  - Total: 816
- Time zone: UTC+3:30 (IRST)

Qarna (Persian: قارنا) (Note: Also romanized as Qārnā; also known as Karna and Qārneh) is a village in Beygom Qaleh Rural District of the Central District in Naqadeh County, West Azerbaijan province, Iran.

== Demographics ==
=== Population ===
At the time of the 2006 National Census, the village's population was 813 in 128 households. The following census in 2011 counted 853 people in 195 households. The 2016 census measured the population of the village as 816 people in 240 households.

On 2 September 1979, Kurds of the village were reported to have been massacred by the recruits of the Islamic Revolutionary Guard Corps. The Qarna massacre led to a shock among the Kurdish population. In an attempt to calm the situation, Ayatollah Khomeini announced the perpetrators of the massacre shall be brought to justice.
