= Galvan, Iran =

Village in West Azerbaijan province, Iran

Galvan Persian: گلوان
- Village
- Location within Iran
- Coordinates: 36°54′38″N 45°19′25″E
- Country: Iran
- Province: West Azerbaijan
- County: Naqadeh
- District: Central
- Rural District: Beygom Qaleh

Population (2016)
  - Total: 557
- Time zone: UTC+3:30 (IRST)

Galvan (Persian: گلوان) (Note: Also romanized as Galvān and Gelvān) is a village in Beygom Qaleh Rural District of the Central District in Naqadeh County, West Azerbaijan province, Iran.

== Demographics ==
=== Ethnicity ===
The village is populated by Kurds.

=== Population ===
At the time of the 2006 National Census, the village's population was 633 in 98 households. The following census in 2011 counted 632 people in 134 households. The 2016 census measured the population of the village as 557 people in 162 households.
