= Khalifan =

Khalifan (خەلیفان) may refer to:

- Khalifan, Mahabad
- Khalifan, Erbil
- Khalifan, Naqadeh
- Khalifan District, in Mahabad County
