= Mount Sultan Yaqub =

Mountain in Iran

Coordinates: 36°32′28″N 44°59′46″E

Kuhe Soltan Yaqob کوه سلطان یعقوب
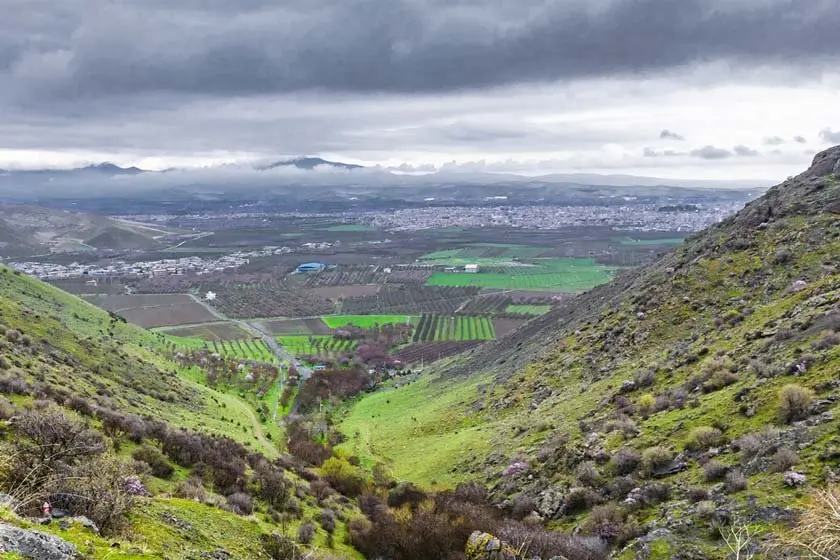

Highest point
- Elevation: 2,000 m (6,600 ft)
- Prominence: 947 m (3,107 ft)
- Listing: Ultra

Geography
- Location: Iran; Naqadeh
- Parent range: Zagros Mountains

Mount Sultan Yaqub (Persian: کوه سلطان یعقوب) is situated 5 kilometers south of the city of Naqadeh, in West Azerbaijan Province, and rises to and rises to an elevation of 2,000 meters above sea level.

== Sultan Yaqub Tourist Attraction ==
The plains surrounding Mount Sultan Yaqub are lush and covered with colorful wildflowers. Additionally, the mineral springs in the area are rich in minerals and are recommended for treating certain ailments, especially skin conditions.
