= Mahabad Dam =

Dam in West Azerbaijan, Iran

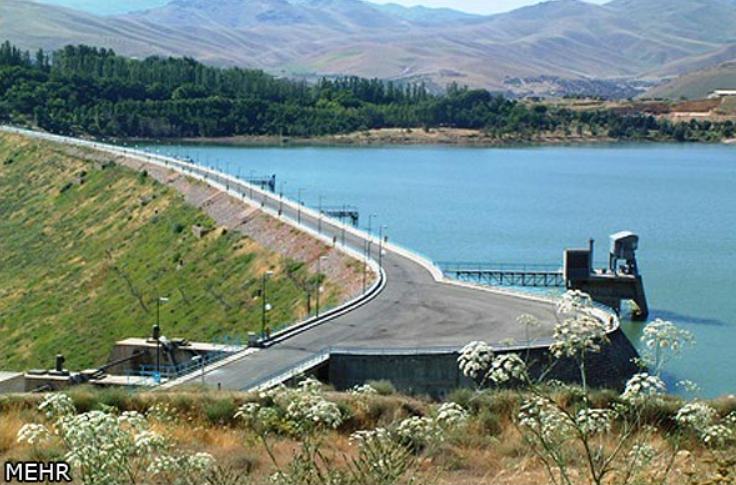
- The dam at a sunny day

- Location within Iran
- Interactive map of Mahabad Dam
- Country: Iran
- Location: Mahabad, West Azerbaijan province
- Coordinates: 36°46′03″N 45°42′06″E
- Purpose: Flood control, Irrigation, Power
- Status: Operational
- Construction began: 1968
- Opening date: 1970; 56 years ago
- Owner: Regional Company of West Azerbaijan

Dam and spillways
- Type of dam: Embankment, earth and rock-fill
- Impounds: Mahabad River
- Height: 45 m (148 ft)
- Height (foundation): 47 m (154 ft)
- Length: 700 m (2,300 ft)
- Width (crest): 8 m (26 ft)
- Width (base): 221.5 m (727 ft)
- Dam volume: 1,500,000 m^{3} (2,000,000 cu yd)

Reservoir
- Total capacity: 230,000,000 m^{3} (190,000 acre⋅ft)
- Active capacity: 190,000,000 m^{3} (150,000 acre⋅ft)
- Catchment area: 808 km2
- Normal elevation: 1,358.5 m (4,457 ft)

Power Station
- Operator: Regional Company of West Azerbaijan
- Commission date: 1972
- Turbines: 2 x 3 MW
- Installed capacity: 6 MW

Mahabad Dam (Persian: سد مهاباد) is an embankment dam on the Mahabad River near the city of Mahabad, West Azerbaijan province, Iran. It was built before the Islamic revolution by Yugoslavian engineers and is one of the ten largest dams in Iran. On average, the total volume of annual water input is equal to 339.304 million cubic meters. The Mahabad Dam provides water for agriculture (71%), industry (11%), drinking (7%), and other miscellaneous purposes (11%). The dam also has a hydroelectric power station. Construction began in 1968 and the dam was completed in 1970.

Mahabad–Sardasht Road and Mahabad-Piranshahr Road pass along the lake.

== Geographical and climatic location ==
This dam is located near Mahabad city. Mahabad is limited to Urmia lake and Miandoab city in the north, Bukan city in the east, Saqqez and Sardasht cities in the south, and Piranshahr and Naqadeh cities in the west.

Mahabad city is located between 45 degrees and 43 minutes east longitude and 36 degrees and 58 minutes to 36 degrees and 32 minutes north latitude And its height is 1,385 meters above sea level.

== amount of rainfall ==
In the Mahabad region, the amount of rainfall in higher altitudes is more than in places with lower altitudes.

Rainfall in the high places of Mahabad region is 750 mm per year, but with the decrease in altitude, the amount of rainfall decreases, so that this amount reaches 300 mm per year at the end of the northern part of Mahabad plain. During ten years, the average amount of annual rainfall is about 350 mm, which is the highest at the beginning of spring, equal to 24.79 mm, and the lowest amount of rainfall is equal to 3 mm in August.The maximum daily rainfall at the beginning of winter is 38 mm.

== See also ==
- Dams in Iran
- List of power stations in Iran
