= Dilanchi Arkhi-ye Olya =

Village in West Azerbaijan province, Iran

Dilanchi Arkhi-ye Olya Persian: ديلان چي ارخي عليا
- Village
- Location within Iran
- Country: Iran
- Province: West Azerbaijan
- County: Naqadeh
- District: Central
- Rural District: Solduz

Population (2016)
  - Total: 474
- Time zone: UTC+3:30 (IRST)

Dilanchi Arkhi-ye Olya (Persian: ديلان چي ارخي عليا) (Note: Also romanized as Dīlānchī Arkhī-ye ‘Olyā and Dīlanchī Arkhī-ye‘Olyā) is a village in Solduz Rural District of the Central District in Naqadeh County, West Azerbaijan province, Iran.

== Demographics ==
=== Population ===
At the time of the 2006 National Census, the village's population was 344 in 67 households. The following census in 2011 counted 418 people in 90 households. The 2016 census measured the population of the village as 457 people in 117 households.
