= Toba Kakri =

Town located within the Pishin District of Pakistan

Toba Kakri is a small town northwest of Quetta, Balochistan, Pakistan. It part of Pishin District lying near to the town of Pishin. Most of the residents belong to the Kakar Tribe. In 2005, like much of Balochistan, the area was badly affected by flooding caused by torrential rainfall and had to receive international aid. In winter nomads from Afghanistan migrate into Pishin through the highlands of Toba Kakri.
