= Malikyar =

Village in Pishin, Pakistan

Coordinates: 30°42′N 67°06′E

Malikyar is a village in Pishin, Pakistan, located 14 km north of Pishin.
