= Pishin Airport =

Pishin Airport (RAF Camp Pishin) (آر اے ایف کیمپ پشین) پشین ہوائی اڈا
- IATA: none; ICAO: OPPN

Summary
- Airport type: Defunct
- Owner/Operator: British Royal Air Force
- Serves: Pishin, Pakistan
- Location: Pishin, Pakistan
- Time zone: PKT (+5)
- Elevation AMSL: 5,075 ft (1,547 m)
- Coordinates: 30.5561°N 66.9853°E
- Interactive map of Pishin Airport (RAF Camp Pishin)

Runways
Direction	Length		Surface
Direction	ft	m	Surface
06/24 16/34	N/A N/A	N/A N/A	N/A N/A

Pishin Airport (ICAO: OPPN) is an abandoned airport in Pishin, Pakistan. The airport was a former airbase for the British Royal Air Force which was built in the 1920s until the end of World War II. The airport had two runways (06/24, 16/34) which are now decommissioned and no longer in use.
