= Chianeh, Naqadeh =

Village in West Azerbaijan province, Iran

Chianeh Persian: چيانه
- Village
- Location within Iran
- Coordinates: 36°57′20″N 45°21′21″E
- Country: Iran
- Province: West Azerbaijan
- County: Naqadeh
- District: Central
- Rural District: Solduz

Population (2016)
  - Total: 3,878
- Time zone: UTC+3:30 (IRST)

Chianeh (Persian: چيانه) (Note: Also known as Chīāna and Chiyana) is a village in Solduz Rural District of the Central District in Naqadeh County, West Azerbaijan province, Iran.

== Demographics ==
=== Ethnicity ===
The village is populated by Azerbaijanis and Kurds.

=== Population ===
At the time of the 2006 National Census, the village's population was 2,283 in 551 households. The following census in 2011 counted 3,155 people in 906 households. The 2016 census measured the population of the village as 3,878 people in 1,152 households. It was the most populous village in its rural district.
