= Dilanchi Arkhi-ye Sofla =

Village in West Azerbaijan province, Iran

Dilanchi Arkhi-ye Sofla Persian: ديلان چي ارخي سفلي
- Village
- Location within Iran
- Coordinates: 37°01′28″N 45°18′13″E
- Country: Iran
- Province: West Azerbaijan
- County: Naqadeh
- District: Central
- Rural District: Solduz

Population (2016)
  - Total: 474
- Time zone: UTC+3:30 (IRST)

Dilanchi Arkhi-ye Sofla (Persian: ديلان چي ارخي سفلي) (Note: Also romanized as Dīlānchī Arkhī-ye Soflá) is a village in Solduz Rural District of the Central District in Naqadeh County, West Azerbaijan province, Iran.

== Demographics ==
=== Population ===
At the time of the 2006 National Census, the village's population was 455 in 85 households. The following census in 2011 counted 462 people in 105 households. The 2016 census measured the population of the village as 474 people in 110 households.
