= Muhammad Shah (disambiguation) =

Muhammad Shah Rangīla (1702–1748) was Mughal emperor from 1719 to 1748.

Muhammad Shah or Mohammad Shah may also refer to:

== People ==
- Muhammad Shah Yusaf Gardezi (fl. 1088), Islamic saint who restored Multan, Pakistan
- Muhammad-Shah ibn Bahram-Shah, last Seljuq amir of Kerman (Persia), 1183–1186
- Muhammad Shah of Kedah, 3rd sultan of Kedah (Malay Peninsula), 1201–1236
- Mohammed Shah I, 2nd ruler of the Bahmani Sultanate (India), 1358–1375
- Muhammad Shah of Brunei (died 1402), first sultan of Brunei (Borneo), 1368–1402
- Muhammad Shah of Selangor
- Muhammad Shah I, Gujarat Sultanate, India, 1403–1404
- Muhammad Shah III Lashkari, 13th sultan of the Bahmani Sultanate, 1463–1482
- Muhammad Shah Mir fifteenth-century Sultan of Kashmir.
- Muhammad Shah of Malacca, 3rd sultan of Malacca (Malay Peninsula), 1424–1444
- Muhammad Shah (Sayyid dynasty), Delhi Sultanate, 1434–1445
- Muhammad Shah II, Muzaffarid Sultan of Gujarat 1442–1451
- Muhammad Shah, ruler of the Jaunpur Sultanate (India), 1457–1458
- Muhammad Shah or Ba Saw Nyo (1435–1494), king of Arakan (Burma), 1492–1494
- Muhammad Shah of Pahang (1450–1475), first sultan of Pahang (Malay Peninsula), 1470–1475
- Muhammad Shah Adil, 4th ruler of the Sur dynasty (Afghan India), 1554–1555
- Mohammad Shah Qajar (1808–1848), king of Persia, 1834–1848
- Muhammed Shah or Jan-Fishan Khan (died 1864), Afghan warlord
- Mohammad Ali Shah Qajar (1872–1925), Shah of Persia, 1907–1909
- Muhammad Shah Rukh (born 1926), former Pakistani field hockey player and cyclist
- Syed Muhammad Shah Noorani (born 1951), spiritual leader of the Noorbakshi Order of Sufism
- Ghulam Mohammad Shah, former Chief Minister of Jammu and Kashmir, India

== Places ==
- Mohammad Shah-e Olya, village in Naqadeh County, West Azerbaijan Province, Iran
- Mohammad Shah-e Sofla, village in Naqadeh County, West Azerbaijan Province, Iran

== See also ==
- Shah Muhammad (disambiguation)
- Sultan Muhammad Shah (disambiguation)
