= Khalifan, Naqadeh =

Village in West Azerbaijan province, Iran

Khalifan Persian: خلیفان
- Village
- Location within Iran
- Coordinates: 36°54′48″N 45°25′54″E
- Country: Iran
- Province: West Azerbaijan
- County: Naqadeh
- District: Central
- Rural District: Beygom Qaleh

Population (2016)
  - Total: 591
- Time zone: UTC+3:30 (IRST)

Khalifan (Persian: خلیفان) (Note: Also romanized as Khalīfān) is a village in Beygom Qaleh Rural District of the Central District in Naqadeh County, West Azerbaijan province, Iran.

== Demographics ==
=== Population ===
At the time of the 2006 National Census, the village's population was 564 in 121 households. The following census in 2011 counted 573 people in 131 households. The 2016 census measured the population of the village as 591 people in 172 households.
