= Qalatan =

Qalatan (Persian: قلاتان) may refer to:

- Qalatan, Naqadeh
- Qalatan, Mohammadyar, Naqadeh County
