= Qaleh Lar, West Azerbaijan =

Village in West Azerbaijan province, Iran

Qaleh Lar Persian: قلعه لر
- Village
- Location within Iran
- Coordinates: 37°00′29″N 45°17′10″E
- Country: Iran
- Province: West Azerbaijan
- County: Naqadeh
- District: Central
- Rural District: Solduz

Population (2016)
  - Total: 420
- Time zone: UTC+3:30 (IRST)

Qaleh Lar (Persian: قلعه لر,) (Note: Also romanized as Qal‘eh Lar; also known as Qalātan) is a village in Solduz Rural District of the Central District in Naqadeh County, West Azerbaijan province, Iran.

== Demographics ==
=== Population ===
At the time of the 2006 National Census, the village's population was 455 in 87 households. The following census in 2011 counted 413 people in 87 households. The 2016 census measured the population of the village as 420 people in 115 households.
