= LGBTQ rights in Goa =

Overview of LGBTQ rights in the Indian state of Goa

- Goa
- Legal status: Legal since 2018
- Gender identity: Third gender recognised; transgender people may change legal gender (with restrictions)
- Discrimination protections: Gender identity protected under federal law (Transgender Persons Act); no state-level protections for sexual orientation

Family rights
- Recognition of relationships: No recognition of same-sex relationships (cohabitation protected)
- Restrictions: Defined as opposite-sex under Goa Civil Code
- Adoption: No

Lesbian, gay, bisexual, transgender, and queer (LGBTQ) rights in Goa are governed primarily by federal Indian law, such as the 2018 decriminalisation of same‑sex activity (Navtej Singh Johar v. Union of India) and the 2014 legal recognition of transgender identity (NALSA v. Union of India), while state-level protections remain limited. Despite this, Goa is portrayed in the media as one of India's more tolerant regions for LGBTQ people.

== Historical context ==
The Goa Inquisition in the 16th century criminalised same-sex activity in then Goa with death penalty. The first person to be criminalised under it was a Muslim man in 1528. The judiciary of Goa ruled him to be burned to ashes and his properties be confiscated to the Crown. Another notable person to be criminalised was a 16 year old Portuguese army soldier Alberto Homem. He was also burnt alive and his properties confiscated.

Though gay activity was criminalised under sodomy law, whether lesbian activity (sodomia foeminarum) can be criminalised became ambiguous. In 1644, the Tribunal of Goa sought clarification reharding this from the General Council of the Holy Office. The majority concluded that female same-sex acts generally did not constitute sodomy and other sexual acts between women were considered as sexual immorality rather than the crime of sodomy.

The Constitutions of the Archbishopric of Goa (1568) classified same-sex activity as a serious sin. It states if the person who committed it is a clergyman, then he shall be deposed of his office and be placed in a religious institution for lifelong penance. And if he is a layman, he would be excommunicated from the Church until he repents and performed whatever penance the Church required.

In 1989, Dominic D'Souza was forcibly quarantined under Goa's Public Health Act after testing HIV-positive. His legal fight became the first documented case of HIV rights activism in Goa. Although D'Souza never claimed to be gay, gay rights activists across India then used his cause to promote queer activism.

In January 2015, Sports and Youth Affairs Minister Ramesh Tawadkar proposed setting up treatment centres to "cure" LGBT youth, drawing severe criticism nationwide. The Chief Minister at the time, Laxmikant Parsekar, later clarified that homosexuality was a "natural quality" and distanced the government from Tawadkar's comments.

In 2023, following the Supreme Court's decision not to legalise same-sex marriage, Indian activists based in Goa urged the state government to take legislative steps but no bills have yet been introduced. In 2025, the Goa government formed the Model Transgender Welfare Board under the provisons of Transgender Persons (Protection of Rights) Act, 2019 to facilitate welfare schemes for transgender people.

== Recognition of relationships ==
Goa applies the Goa Civil Code, which defines marriage as between a man and a woman. There is no legal recognition for same-sex marriages or civil unions. However, in 2023, the Supreme Court noted that same-sex couples have the right to cohabit and enjoy some protections under law.

== Discrimination protections ==
There are currently no state-level anti-discrimination laws protecting sexual orientation or gender identity in Goa. Federal law under the Transgender Persons Act prohibits discrimination based on gender identity, but not sexual orientation.

== Demographics ==
According to the Humsaath Trust Goa in 2013, there are more than 10,000 people belonging to the LGBT community in Goa, with around 4,500 registered with the Trust. According to the 2011 census, there are 398 transgender people in Goa. However, as of 2024, only 12 transgender people were registered in the electoral rolls with the first set of transgender people registered to the electoral roll in 2022.

== Societal attitudes ==
According to a 2018 study by the Goa Livelihoods Forum, 63% of LGBTQ individuals reported workplace verbal abuse, and 87% of transgender respondents dropped out of school due to harassment.

However, Goa is perceived as more tolerant than many other Indian states, especially in tourist areas, with many LGBTQ individuals reporting neutral to positive experiences compared to other states of India. There has also been an increase in the number of gay marriages performed in the State, although these ceremonies have no legal validity.

== Activism and community ==
- The Goa Rainbow Trust, established in 2018, provides mental health support, advocacy, and community outreach.
- Rainbow Pride- Pride De Goa walks have been held in Panaji from 2017 to 2019.
- The Humsaath Trust, as of 2023, supports over 10,000 LGBTQ individuals in the state and has advocated for legal protections and employment rights.

== See also ==
- LGBT rights in India
- LGBT rights in Tamil Nadu
- LGBTQ rights in Karnataka
- LGBTQ rights in Gujarat
- Recognition of same-sex unions in India
