= Pride De Goa =

LGBTQ event in Goa, India

Pride De Goa was the official pride parade walk in the state of Goa, India. It was organised by the NGO Goa Rainbow Trust.

== History ==
=== 2017 ===
The first pride walk in Goa was organised on October 28, 2017. The walk took place from Old Secretariat to Miramar Beach, an approximate distance of five kilometres. One of the organisers Alexander Fernandes said, "We hope this walk will get rid of homophobia in some way. We want people to know that we are not harmful or ‘bad people’. We deserve respect like anyone else, and that we too have human rights." The event included LGBTQ+ parties, a film festival, and a pride walk.

Another organiser, Diana Dias, talks about taking tips and suggestions from other Indian cities who have previously held pride walks. She said, "We have a large LGBT community in Goa, but most prefer to stay under the scanner since it is a very small place and everyone knows each other. However, we are trying to create more awareness now."

Chris Fernandes (chief executive office and founder of Goa Rainbow Trust), who came out in the open about her sexuality and is proud of it, founded Adhikar to help girls dealing with similar issues in the state. “Among the LGBT, lesbians are the most closeted. Parents force them to get married and when there’s a child involved it gets more complicated,” she said, adding that she comes across a number of school and college going youth who are looking for someone to talk to.

The participants were encouraged to wear masks if they wanted to keep their identities private and steer away from religious and political posters.

=== 2018 ===
In 2018, the second iteration of Pride De Goa was organised on October 27, 2018, by Goa Rainbow Trust. The pride walk started from Deltin Royale Jetty on the Panjim side of Mandovi river and marched towards Miramar Beach. Marchers were seen holding a 10-metre-long rainbow flag and posters like ‘Mog Kar Dwesh Nai’ and ‘Pyar Ke Sab Rang Hai’, etc.

=== 2019 ===
In 2019, the third iteration of Pride De Goa was organised on November 9, 2019, by Goa Rainbow Trust. The Pride week commenced with a flashmob at Kadamba Bus Stand, Panjim, on November 4, 2019, followed by a flashmob at Mall de Goa on November 5, 2019, Porvorim and a Pre-Pride party at The Park Hotel, Calangute on November 6, 2019. The Pride parade on November 9 was officially opened by Wendell Rodricks and Apurva Asrani, and also had allies in the staff of The Lalit Hotel. The participants assembled at Panjim Promenade and made their way to Miramar Beach. The Pride week concluded with the Post-Pride party at Rudy's Bar & Grill, Chapora on November 9, 2019. Some of the sponsors and partners that helped Goa Rainbow Trust achieve the successful Pride march include The Lalit Hotel, Keshav Suri Foundation, It Gets Better India, The Park Hotel, Rudy's Bar & Grill, Sofar Sounds Goa, Stranger & Sons, White Owl and Woodburns Whiskey.

== See also ==
- LGBTQ rights in Goa
