= Mahabad River =

River in Iran

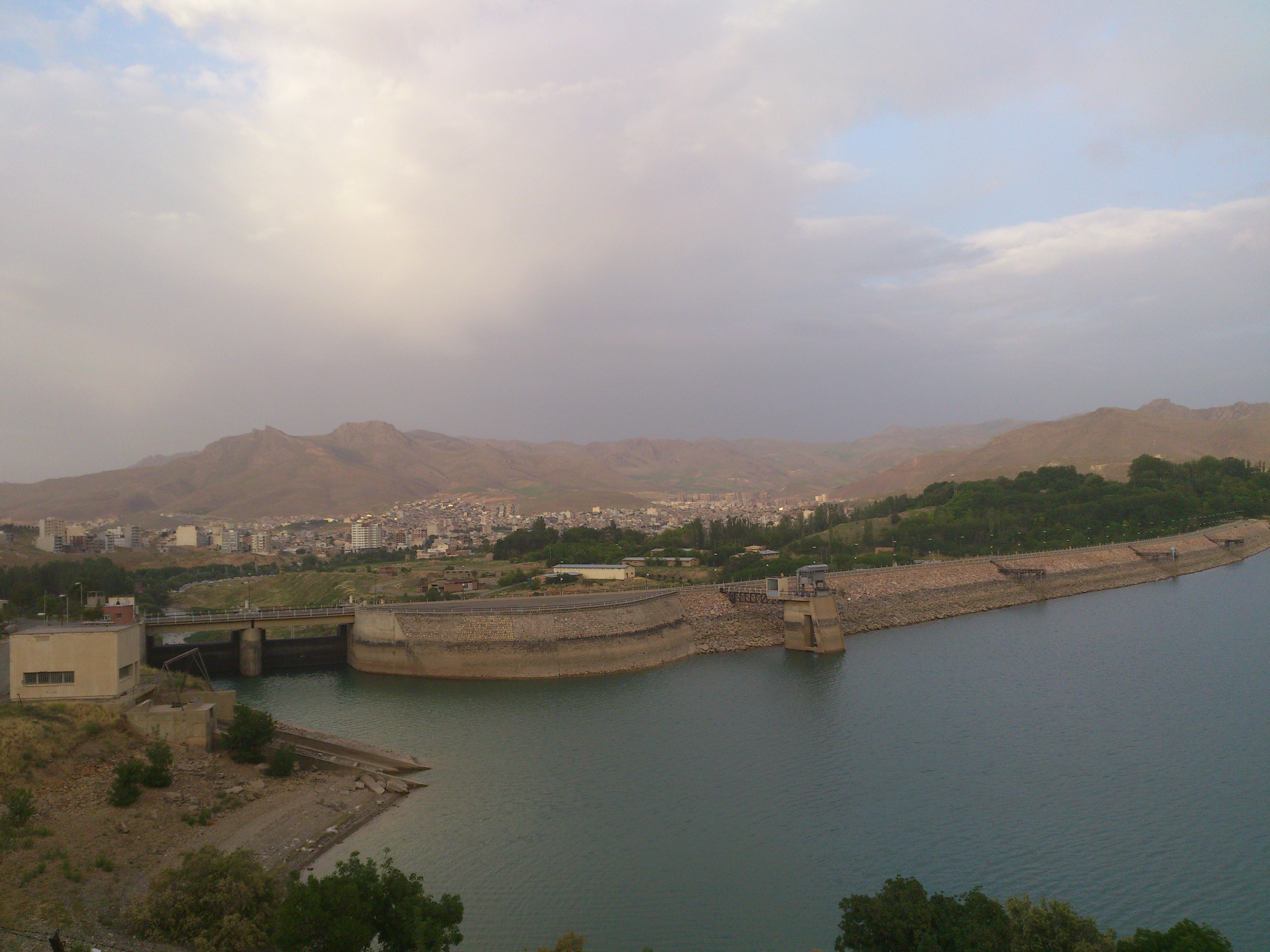
Mahabad River

The Mahabad (Persian: مهابادرود, Sorani Kurdish: چۆمی مەهابادێ, Kurdish: çomî Mehabadê) is an endorheic river in Mahabad county Iran, located at 36°46′03″N 45°42′06″E and which flows into the southern end of Lake Urmia. The Kauter and Beytas Rivers originate from the southern heights of the plain and run to the north in parallel. They join and create the Mahabad Dam reservoir and continue running as the Mahabad River.

The river has been crossed by the Mahabad Dam near the city of Mahabad, West Azerbaijan province.

== Gallery ==
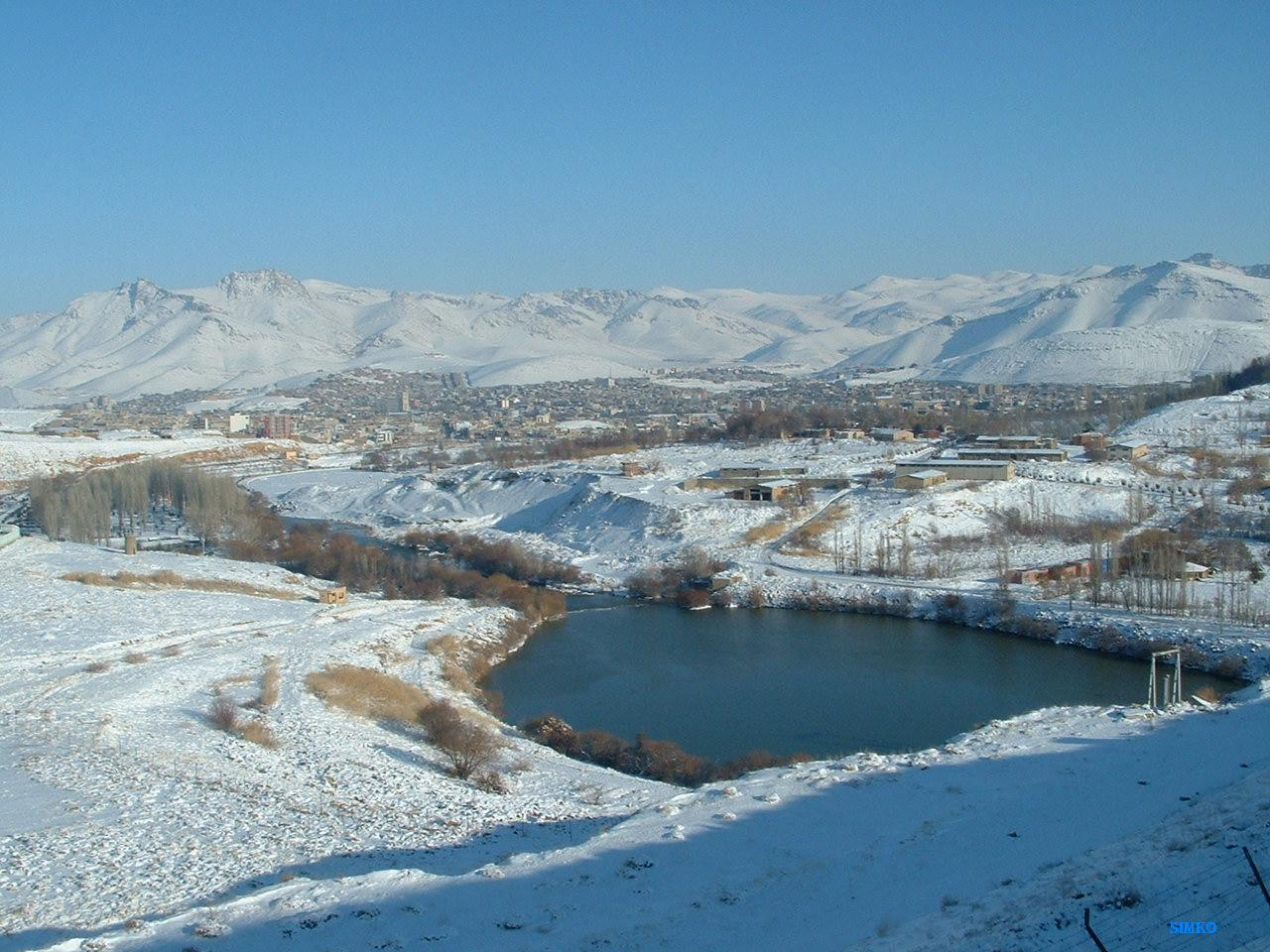
Mahabad in December 2006

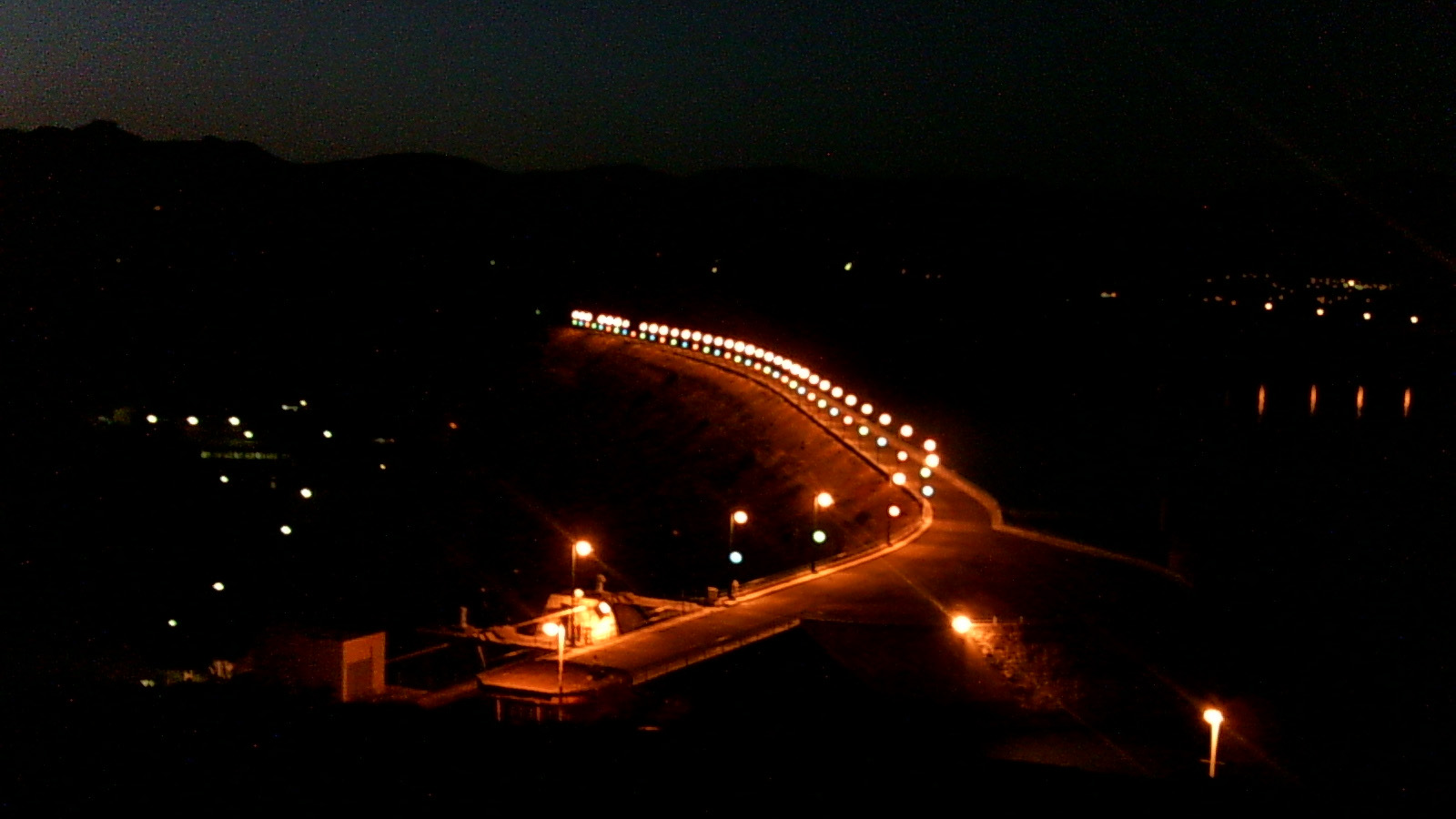
Mahabad Dam at night

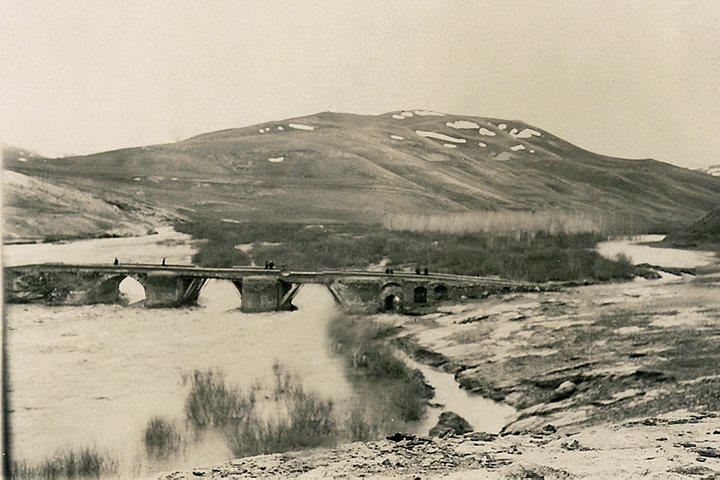
Soor Bridge, 1920s

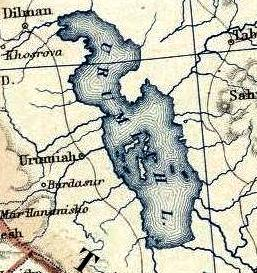
Mahabad river at southern Lake Urmia, from an 1861 map

== See also ==
- Mahabad Dam
