= LGBTQ rights in Gujarat =

Overview of LGBTQ rights in the Indian state of Gujarat

- Gujarat
- Legal status: Legal since 2018
- Gender identity: Third gender recognised; transgender people may change legal gender
- Discrimination protections: Anti-discrimination protections under Supreme Court rulings Navtej Singh Johar (2018) and NALSA (2014)

Family rights
- Recognition of relationships: No legal recognition of same-sex marriage; live-in relationships allowed; Maitri karar for Lesbian Couples
- Adoption: No

LGBTQ rights in Gujarat refer to the legal status, protections, challenges, and activism related to LGBTQ+ people in the Indian state of Gujarat. The 2018 Supreme Court ruling decriminalised consensual same-sex relations across India, including Gujarat. Despite this legal change, LGBTQ individuals in Gujarat continue to face social stigma and discrimination.

== History ==
Bahuchara Mata has been widely worshipped by the Hijras or transgender people. According to legend, she is believed to have undergone self-sacrifice involving her own breasts, an act that symbolizes renunciation and spiritual power. The legend is she was a girl and was travelling through the forest in Gujarat with other travellers. They were attacked by thieves. Fearing that her modesty will be outraged, she cut off her breast using dagger. Consequently, she died. In other versions, Bahuchara is seen as a male who transformed into a woman before cutting her breasts. In another story, she is said to curse her husband after discovering him going into the forest to engage in homoerotic acts, causing his genitals to fall off and compelling him to dress as a woman. Other narratives connect Bahuchara Mata with gender variance following her deification. In one tale, a king prays to Bahuchara Mata for a son, and she grants his wish; however, the prince grows up impotent. Later, Bahuchara appears to him in a dream and instructs him to remove his genitals, wear women's clothing, and become her devotee. It is believed that she continues to identify impotent men and commands them to follow the same path, with refusal resulting in punishment across multiple future incarnations. These stories are often cited as part of the origin of her devotional tradition, where followers are associated with castration and strict celibacy.

The province of Gujarat was also administered by Khwajasara who was sent there by the noble Abdullah Khan during Jahangir's reign. Iitimad Khan, a eunuch deeply trusted by Sultan Mahmud of Gujarat and was also the governor of Gujarat. He is known for undertaking a pilgrimage to Mecca, where he obtained a revered stone believed to bear the Prophet's footprint. He was also the military commander with 4000 soldiers under him. Malik Kafur, regarded as one of the most influential eunuchs in Indian history, was from Gujarat. He was of descent and was bought up in Cambay in Gujarat. Following Alauddin Khalji's conquest of Cambay around 1299, he was captured by the general Nusrat Khan. He was then castrated, and converted to Islam and renamed Malik Kafur, which is a common practice for slaves destined for court service. He was also in a homosexual relationship with Alauddin Khilji. Another figure, Khusrau Khan, a Hindu from Gujarat, was taken during Khalji's campaign in Malwa in 1305. He was also castrated and converted to Islam. He later ascended to the throne as Sultan of Delhi, ruling briefly for about two months in 1320.

In 2011, the Gujarat government banned the book Great Soul; Mahatma Gandhi and His Struggle with India by Pulitzer-winning author Joseph Lelyveld, as the book hints at Gandhiji being bisexual. The then Chief minister Narendra Modi also demanded the Indian government to ban the book nationwide.

== Legal status ==
Same-sex sexual activity has been legal in Gujarat since 2018, following the Supreme Court ruling in Navtej Singh Johar v. Union of India. Along with the National Legal Services Authority v. Union of India (2014) ensure that LGBTQ persons are protected from discrimination in employment, housing, and access to services, which apply in Gujarat.

In February 2019, the Transgender Welfare Board was constituted by the Gujarat government under the Department of Social Justice and Empowerment for the welfare of transgender people. The chairman of the board will be the State Social justice and empowerment minister, and the board will have 16 members, including 2 Trans woman, 2 Tran Male, 2 Eunuch and 2 representatives of NGOs. However, by November 2019, not a single transgender representative had been appointed to the Board. The board became fully constituted only on July 22, 2021. During the time only 50 lakhs were allocated for the board with no meetings. Its first meeting happened in 2024.

== Recognition of same-sex unions in Gujarat ==
The Gujarat Registration of Marriages Act, 2006 does not explicitly ban same-sex marriages, but it uses the terms "bride" and "bridegroom" for married spouses. However, many same-sex marriages have happened in the state, a notable one including Prince Manvendra Singh Gohil with his partner DeAndre Richardson. In April 2026, Gujarat Uniform Civil Code (UCC) Bill was passed by the state which also doesn't recognise same-sex marriage.

The maitri karar (friendship agreement), is a contractual practice originating in the 1970s among upper-caste Hindus to legitimize relationships outside marriage. Traditionally, it allowed married men to formalize ties with partners through a notarized agreement circumventing the Hindu marriage act which prohibits bigamy. Since this is a legal agreement, lesbian couples in the state been using it to register their cohabitation. The first maitri karar happened in the state in 1988. In 2016, such an inter-faith maitri karar also happened. In June 2020, a lesbian couple in maitri karar petitioned the Gujarat High Court seeking recognition of their right to live together and protection from harassment by their families. The Court upheld the plea and ordered police to give protection to the couple.

== Social attitudes ==
Gujarat is a very socially conservative state. The largest city in the state Ahmedabad also is reported as very conservative. The LGBTQ community face stigma and fear. In June 2018 lesbian couple in Ahmedabad committed suicide. In 2023, a queer student student was sexually harassed in the Gujarat National Law University (GNLU). Their along with the rape of a female student was anonymously posted on Instagram. The institute didn't take any action. So, the Gujarat high court took suo motu cognisance of the case and asked institute to submit affidavit. In 2024, the affidavit filed by the university's registrar claimed nothing had happened and urged the closure of the case. The court remarked “He had the audacity to make such a statement before us while the matter was under judicial consideration,”.

== Transgender Community ==
In Gujarati language, transgender people are called Pavaiyaa (પાવૈયા). The state has 11,544 transgender people according to the 2011 Census. In 2022, there are 1,417 transgender people registered with the Election agency. However, in 2022 only about 32% of them voted in state election.

In 2019, Jaysawal Naresh Babulal became the first transgender to contest in an election in Gujarat. She contested from Ahmedabad East Lok Sabha constituency. However, she had to register as a male, as her legal documents had her male name. In 2021, Alisha Patel, became the first transgender person was issued identity card by the state. In 2025, the state police also announced to recruit transgender people as traffic marshal.

== Activism and organizations ==
The first LGBT pride march happened in the state in Surat on 6 October 2013. In the following years, pride march has happened in major cities like Ahmedabad, Vadodara and in the Capital city Gandhinagar.

Notable LGBTQIA+ organisations in the state includes:

- Vikalp Women's Group, founded in 1996 by Maya Sharma to support lesbian and women's issues.
- Lakshya Trust, established in 2000 in Vadodara to empower sexual minorities and provide HIV/AIDS prevention services.
- QueerAbad, established by Anahita Sarabhai and Shamini Kothari, to create a queer space in the Ahmedabad city.
- Gandhinagar Queer Pride Foundation in Gandhinagar city.

== Art ==
Bhupen Khakhar, famous painter and Gujarati fiction writer is a gay person. In 2001, first Gujarati gay magazine Lakshyaa was published.

=== Film ===
In 2013, Gujarat state government denied entertainment tax exemption under state's entertainment tax policy to the Gujarati film Meghdhanushya — The Colour of Life citing concerns that it promotes homosexuality. It was the only film to be refused tax exemption in 16 years since the policy came into effect. This was challenged in the in 2014 in the Gujarat High Court which ordered tax exemption. This decision was challenged by the state government in Supreme court. In 2015, the Supreme Court halted the release of the film itself citing homosexuality is seen as a “social evil” by some.

In 2024, second Gujarati film based on gay relationships Katla Curry was debut on a film festival in Mumbai and later released on OTT platform.

== See also ==
- LGBTQ rights in Kerala
