= Mohammad Oraz =

Iranian mountain climber (1969–2003)

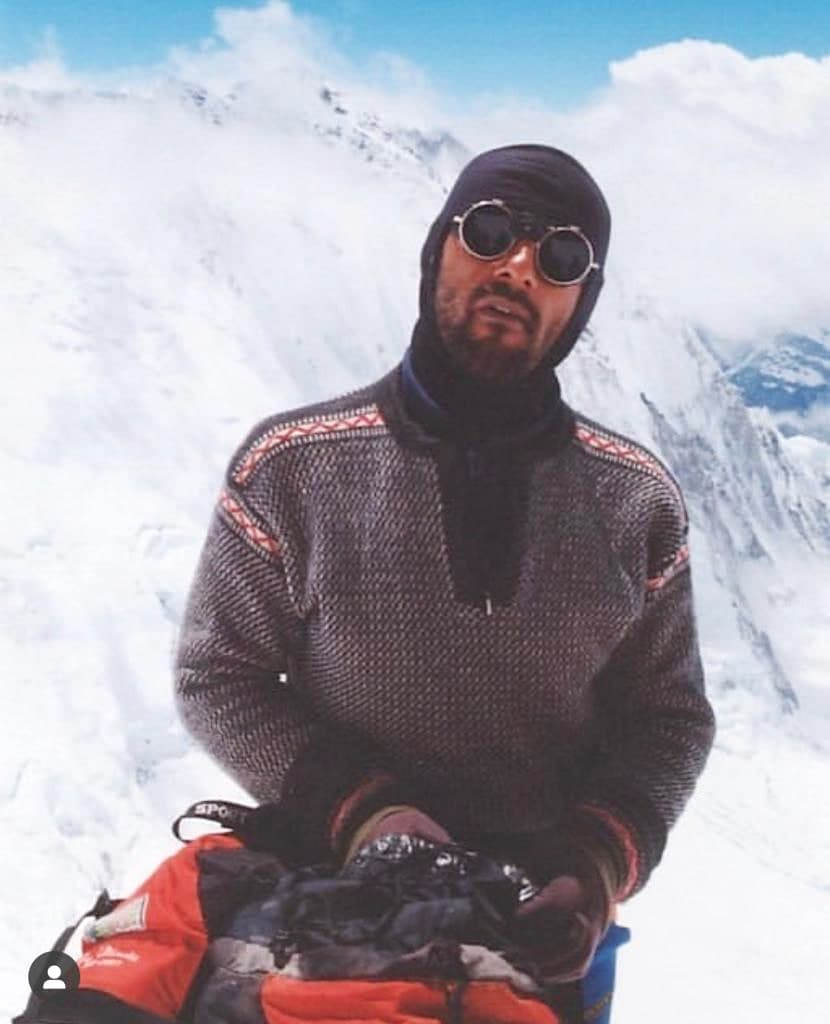
- Born: 1969; Naqadeh, West Azerbaijan province, Imperial Iran
- Died: 7 September 2003 (aged 33–34); Islamabad, Pakistan
- Occupation: Mountaineer

Mohammad Oraz (Mihemed Ewraz, Persian: محمد اوراز; 1969 in Naghadeh, Iran – 7 September 2003 in Islamabad, Pakistan) was an Iranian mountaineer. He was the second Iranian climber after Hooman Aprin to conquer Mount Everest, reaching the summit in 1998.

== Biography ==
Oraz was born in September 1969, in Naqadeh, West Azerbaijan.

Oraz accompanied the writer Rory Stewart for three months during his walk across Iran.

In 2003, while descending from the summit of Gasherbrum I, Oraz and his colleague, Moqbel Honarpajouh, were hit by an avalanche. The pair were transferred to Shifa Hospital in Islamabad, Honarpajouh survived but Oraz died 20 days later on 7 September.
