= Behzadabad =

Behzadabad بهزاداباد
- Village
- Location within Iran
- Coordinates: 33°40′49″N 48°53′12″E
- Country: Iran
- Province: Lorestan
- County: Dorud
- Bakhsh: Silakhor
- Rural District: Chalanchulan

Population (2006)
  - Total: 276
- Time zone: UTC+3:30 (IRST)
  - Summer (DST): UTC+4:30 (IRDT)

Behzadabad (Persian: بهزاداباد, also Romanized as Behzādābād; also known as Beyzābād, Bezābād, and Bīzābād) is a village in Chalanchulan Rural District, Silakhor District, Dorud County, Lorestan Province, Iran. At the 2006 census, its population was 276, in 63 families.
