= Shirdel Sadak =

Shirdel Sadak شيردل سادك
- Village
- Location within Iran
- Coordinates: 31°12′40″N 61°43′08″E
- Country: Iran
- Province: Sistan and Baluchestan
- County: Hirmand
- Bakhsh: Central
- Rural District: Margan

Population (2006)
  - Total: 130
- Time zone: UTC+3:30 (IRST)
  - Summer (DST): UTC+4:30 (IRDT)

Shirdel Sadak (Persian: شيردل سادك, also Romanized as Shīrdel Sādak; also known as Deh-e Shīrdel, Shāh Moḩammad, and Shīrdel) is a village in Margan Rural District, in the Central District of Hirmand County, Sistan and Baluchestan Province, Iran. At the 2006 census, its population was 130, in 32 families.
