= Sultan Mahmud =

Sultan Mahmud or Sultan Mahmoud may refer to:

- Mahmud I (1696–1754), Sultan of the Ottoman Empire
- Mahmud II (1785–1839), Sultan of the Ottoman Empire
- Sultan Mahmud (minister), Burmese politician and Rohingya leader
- Mahmud of Ghazni (971–1030), Sultan of Persia in the 11th century
- Sultan Mahmud (Chagatai) (died 1402), Khan of the Western Chagatai Khanate
- Sultan Mahmud (Shirvanshah), the 39th shah of Shirvan 1501–1502
- Sultan Mahmud Iskandar of Perak, 11th Sultan of Perak
- Sultan Mahmud Iskandar (1932–2010), 8th Yang di-Pertuan Agong of Malaysia the 24th Sultan of Johor
- Mahmud Shah of Malacca (died 1528), Sultan of Malacca
- Sultan Mahmud (air officer), former chief of Bangladesh Air Force
- Sultan Mahmood (boxer), Pakistani boxer
- Sultan Mehmood, Pakistani politician

== See also ==
- Sultan Muhammad (disambiguation)
