= Shah Mohammad Qasemi =

Shah Mohammad Qasemi شاه محمدقاسمي
- Village
- Location within Iran
- Coordinates: 31°05′17″N 61°43′05″E
- Country: Iran
- Province: Sistan and Baluchestan
- County: Hirmand
- Bakhsh: Central
- Rural District: Margan

Population (2006)
  - Total: 136
- Time zone: UTC+3:30 (IRST)
  - Summer (DST): UTC+4:30 (IRDT)

Shah Mohammad Qasemi (Persian: شاه محمدقاسمي, also Romanized as Shāh Moḩammad Qāsemī; also known as Deh-e Shāh Moḩammad Qāsemī, Deh-e Shāh Moḩammad, Ḩājjī Shāh Moḩammad, and Shāh Moḩammad) is a village in Margan Rural District, in the Central District of Hirmand County, Sistan and Baluchestan Province, Iran. At the 2006 census, its population was 136, in 31 families.
