= Mohammed I =

Mohammed I may refer to:

- Muhammad I of Córdoba, Umayyad Emir of Cordoba in 9th century Islamic Iberia
- Muhammad I Tapar, Sultan of the Seljuk dynasty (1105–1118)
- Muhammad I of Alamut (1138–1162)
- Muhammad I of Granada (1195-1273), the founder of the Emirate of Granada
- Mohammed I of Kanem, of the Sayfawa dynasty
- Mehmed I (1389–1421), Sultan of the Ottoman Empire
- Askia Muhammad I (c. 1442–1538), King of the Songhai Empire in West Africa
- Mohammed I Saadi (1554–1557), Moroccan sultan, see Askia Ishaq I
- Sultan Muhammad I of Kelantan, first Sultan of Kelantan
- Shah Muhammad I of Kerman from the Kerman Seljuk Sultanate
- Muhammad I of the Eretnids, the second Bey of the Eretnid Beylik.
- Muhammad I of Khwarazm, the first Shah of the Khwarazmian Empire.
- Muhammad I of Shirvan, the second Shah of Shirvan.
