= Mohammed II =

Mohammed II may refer to:

- Muhammad II of Córdoba (fl. 852–866), fourth Caliph of Cordoba, of the Umayyad dynasty in the Al-Andalus (Moorish Iberia)
- Muhammad II of Ifriqiya (d. 875), eighth Emir of Ifriqiya from Aghlabid house (864–875)
- Mahmud II of Great Seljuk (died 1131), proclaimed himself the Seljuk sultan of Baghdad
- Muhammad II of Great Seljuq (died 1159)
- Muhammad II of Khwarezm, ruler of the Khwarezmid Empire from 1200 to 1220
- Muhammad II of Granada, second Nasrid ruler of the Emirate of Granada in Al-Andalus on the Iberian Peninsula (r. 22 January 1273 – 8 April 1302)
- Mehmed II "the Conqueror" (1432–1481), Sultan of the Ottoman Empire
- Mohamed II of the Maldives, Sultan of Maldives from 1467 to 1481
- Abu Abdallah Mohammed II Saadi (died 1578), Sultan of Morocco 1574–1576
- Muhammad II ibn al-Husayn (1811–1859), eleventh leader of the Husainid Dynasty and ruler of Tunisia
- Muhammad bin Tughluq (1290–1351, r. 1325–1351) or Muhammad II, eighteenth Sultan of Delhi.
- Muhammad-Shah II of the Kerman Seljuk Sultanate
- Muhammad II of Alamut
