= Tupuzabad, Urmia =

Tupuzabad, Iran توپوزاباد
- Village
- Location within Iran
- Coordinates: 37°23′57″N 45°08′41″E
- Country: Iran
- Province: West Azerbaijan
- County: Urmia
- Bakhsh: Central
- Rural District: Baranduzchay-ye Jonubi

Population (2006)
  - Total: 171
- Time zone: UTC+3:30 (IRST)
  - Summer (DST): UTC+4:30 (IRDT)

Tupuzabad (Persian: توپوزاباد, romanized: Tūpūzābād; Syriac: Ṭūpzābād) (Note: Also known as Topūzābād or Topouzawa.) is a village in Baranduzchay-ye Jonubi Rural District, in the Central District of Urmia County, West Azerbaijan Province, Iran. At the 2006 census, its population was 171, in 43 families.

== History ==
Ṭūpzābād was inhabited by 7 Church of the East Christian families with no priest or church in 1877, as per Edward Lewes Cutts. Prior to the First World War, there were 40 Assyrian houses in the village, as per the list presented by Agha Petros to the Lausanne Peace Conference in 1922. It was located in the Baranduz District.

== Bibliography ==
- Gaunt, David (2006). Massacres, Resistance, Protectors: Muslim-Christian Relations in Eastern Anatolia during World War I. Gorgias Press.
- Wilmshurst, David (2000). The Ecclesiastical Organisation of the Church of the East, 1318–1913 (PDF). Peeters Publishers.
