= Pishin, Pakistan =

Pishin پشین
- City
- Location within Balochistan, Pakistan Location within Pakistan
- Coordinates: 30°35′05″N 66°59′41″E
- Country: Pakistan
- Province: (Balochistan, Pakistan) Balochistan
- District: Pishin

Government
  - Type: Municipal Corporation
  - Mayor: Seat Vacant
  - Deputy Mayor: Seat Vacant
  - Deputy Commissioner: Dr. Yasir Khan Bazai
- Elevation: 1,555 m (5,102 ft)
- Highest elevation: 1,700 m (5,500 ft)
- Lowest elevation: 1,400 m (4,500 ft)

Population (2023)
  - City: 107,646
  - Rank: 117th in Pakistan
- Time zone: UTC+5 (PST)
- Postal code: 86700
- Calling code: 826
- HDI (2024): 0.573 (medium)

Pishin (Pashto: پښين) is a city in Balochistan that serves as the administrative headquarters of Pishin District in Pakistan's Balochistan province.

== History ==
Formerly part of the Afghan Durrani Empire, Pishin was established by the British Empire as a military and civil station in 1883. It played a role in the three Anglo-Afghan Wars (1838-1919). Local tribes from the area assisted the Afghans in fighting the British by attacking British military convoys en route to Afghanistan. During World War II, the British built two airbases in the district; one near the town of Pishin and the other in Saranan.

== Geography ==
Pishin is located in the northwest of Balochistan, near the border with Afghanistan. Tremors from the 2008 Ziarat earthquake were felt in the town.

== Climate ==
In the summer, temperatures can reach 40 °C (104 °F). In the winter, temperatures can decrease to below freezing.

== Agriculture ==
The region is known in Balochistan for fruit production. It supplies a variety of fruits, such as apples.

== Demographics ==
=== Population ===
Historical population
Year	Pop.	±% p.a.
1951	3,106	—
1961	2,906	−0.66%
1972	10,068	+11.96%
1981	14,715	+4.31%
1998	22,955	+2.65%
2017	35,577	+2.33%
2023	107,646	+20.26%

According to 2023 census, Pishin had a population of 107,646.

Languages

Languages of Pishin (2023 Census)
1. Pashto (98.4%)
2. Punjabi (0.84%)
3. Urdu (0.31%)
4. Others (0.45%)

=== Religion ===
Religious groups in Pishin City (1941 & 2017)
Religious group	1941		2017	
Religious group	Pop.	%	Pop.	%
Islam	1,245	65.87%	35,067	98.65%
Christianity	15	0.79%	473	1.33%
Hinduism	447	23.65%	3	0.01%
Sikhism	183	9.68%	—N/a	—N/a
Ahmadiyya	—N/a	—N/a	4	0.01%
Total population	1,890	100%	35,547	100%

== Transport ==
Transport is mostly by car or bus. The town connects with Quetta, Khanozai, Barshore, and Saranan. In 1883, a major railway and road were constructed to connect towns in Pakistan.

- Ghazi faiz mohammad tareen the hero how fight against the British Empire
- Qazi Muhammad Essa, senior leader of the Pakistan Movement and a close associate of Quaid-e-Azam
- Jennifer Musa, politician and lady social worker
- Jehangir Ashraf Qazi, diplomat, former Pakistani ambassador to the United States
- Qazi Faez Isa, Chief Justice of the Supreme Court of Pakistan
- Sultan Golden, motorcycle stuntman
- Haseebullah Khan, cricketer
