= Sultan Golden =

Pakistani stuntman

Sultan Muhammad Khan Golden
- سلطان محمد خان گولڈن
- Born: Sultan Muhammad Khan; Pishin District, Balochistan, Pakistan
- Occupations: Motorcar and motorcycle stuntman
- Known for: Reverse motorcar jumping, stunt driving records

Sultan Muhammad Khan "Golden" (Urdu: سلطان محمد خان گولڈن), commonly known as Sultan Golden, is a Pakistani motorcar and motorcycle stuntman and jumping specialist. He is known for introducing the sport of reverse motorcar jumping and for setting multiple national and international stunt-driving records.

== Early life ==
Sultan Muhammad Khan Golden belongs to the district of Pishin, near Quetta, in Pakistan’s Balochistan province.

== Career ==
Sultan Golden began his career as a stunt performer specializing in high-risk motorcar and motorcycle jumps. He is credited with introducing reverse motorcar jumping, a stunt discipline involving vehicles being driven and launched in reverse over long distances and obstacles.

=== Jumping records ===
In 1987, Sultan Golden set a world record by jumping over 22 cars, covering a distance of 249 feet, surpassing the previous record held by an American stuntman who had jumped 246 feet over cars.

He later set another world record by reverse jumping 150 feet over 15 cars.

== Reverse driving records ==
On 13 December 2025, Sultan Golden broke the world record for the fastest reverse car drive by completing a one-mile reverse drive in 57 seconds.

On the same day, he also set a new world record for the longest-distance reverse ramp jump, covering 121.72 feet (37.1 m).

He has also announced plans to attempt the motorcar reverse distance world record, aiming to travel 800 kilometres in 13 hours and 48 minutes.

== Recognition ==
Sultan Golden’s achievements have been widely reported by Pakistani and international media outlets. He has performed at public events and exhibitions and is regarded as a prominent figure in Pakistan’s stunt-performance community.

== See also ==
- Stunt performer
- Motorcycle stunt riding
- World records
