= Naqadeh =

City in West Azerbaijan province, Iran

Naqadeh Persian: نقده
- City
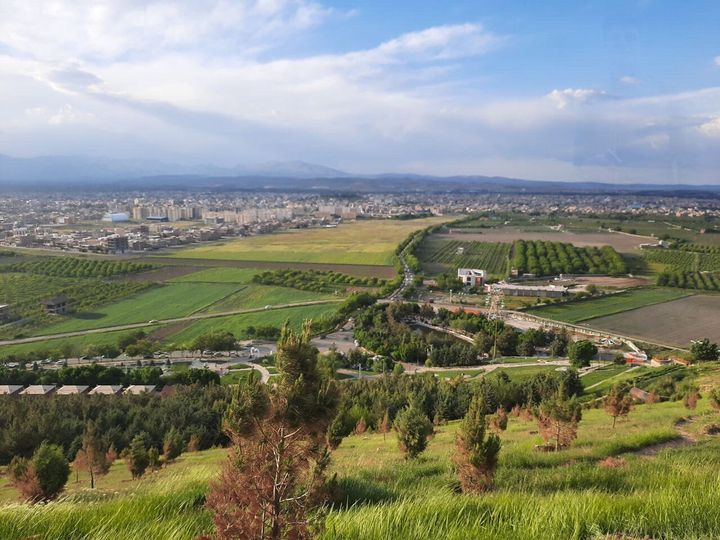

- Location within Iran
- Coordinates: 36°57′17″N 45°23′17″E
- Country: Iran
- Province: West Azerbaijan
- County: Naqadeh
- District: Central

Population (2016)
  - Total: 81,598
- Time zone: UTC+3:30 (IRST)

Naqadeh (Persian: نقده) (Note: Formerly known as Sulduz; Azerbaijani: سۇلدۇز; and Kurdish: نه‌غه‌ده‌, romanized as Nexede) is a city in the Central District of Naqadeh County, West Azerbaijan province, Iran, serving as capital of both the county and the district. The city has at least one Armenian church.

== Etymology ==
Naqadeh is the current name of the town (and county). The former name, known as Solduz (also spelled Sulduz, or Suldouze), in reference to the Mongol Sulduz tribe, may have replaced an older name (now lost) during the reign of the Ilkhanid ruler Ghazan in 1303.

== History ==
In 1303, during the reign of Ilkhanid ruler Ghazan, the area comprising Naqadeh County was distributed in fiefs. According to the orientalist Vladimir Minorsky (died 1966), citing the 16th-century Kurdish prince and writer Sharafkhan Bidlisi, during the rule of the Turkoman Aq Qoyunlu and Qara Qoyunlu (in about the 15th century), the Kurds of the Mukri occupied the county of Naqadeh, and its old inhabitants were most likely "reduced to servitude". Minorsky, citing a mutilated and undated part of Bidlisi's work, narrates that a certain Budak of the Kurdish Baban tribe captured the county in which Naqadeh is located from the Qizilbash. This event may refer to one of the abrupt outbursts of skirmishes which occurred on the Safavid frontier.

In 1828, following the Treaty of Turkmenchay, Iranian crown prince Abbas Mirza handed over the district in which Naqadeh is situated as a fief to 800 Turkic Karapapakh families and these new settlers, in return, had to have 400 horsemen ready for disposal for the government. Just prior to their arrival, the district had a population of 4–5,000 families of both Kurds and Muqaddam Shia Turks. The district would gradually fall into the hands of the Karapapakh newcomers. The state-supported Karapapakh consolidated their power quickly by attacking the Kurdish Mangur and Zerza tribes.

In 1914, 80 Assyrian families were left in the town, and 120 Jewish families of which most have since then migrated to Israel. The Jews of Naqadeh County were "probably the oldest element in the present population" of the county. In 1917, there were 598 Assyrians in 108 families at Sulduz; 35 were elderly, 60 were orphans, and 84 were able-bodied.

During the Ottoman occupation from 1908 to 1912, the Karapapakh population suffered considerably as they were seen as Iranian agents. The Ottomans attempted to destroy the tribal structure and free the rayah of the town. The town would change hands between the Ottomans and the Russians in this period, until the Iranians took control in 1919.

Ethnic relations were friendlier despite clashes during the 1940s when the town was part of the short-lived Republic of Mahabad.

The local Azerbaijanis were favored by the state and dominated the town politically and socially, which added to the ethnic violence in the town. Kurdish separatism and the political demands by Kurds were a source of concern for the Azerbaijanis, fearing the loss of influence in the region. In April 1979, after the Iranian Revolution, the two ethnic groups clashed in the town and about 100 to 300 people were killed. The reason for the clashes was the relatively liberal political atmosphere in the country which pushed the Kurds to openly aspire for self-governance. The new government furthermore recruited local Shia Azerbaijanis to the Islamic Revolutionary Guard Corps which went on to massacre the Kurds of nearby Qarna, Qalat and Egriqash.

In recent years, nationalist Azerbaijani events have been repressed by the state, while Kurdish nationalism has become more radical as seen with the attraction among the youth towards the Kurdistan Free Life Party.

== Demographics ==
=== Ethnicity and religion ===
The town has a Shia (Karapapakh) majority, with a Sunni Kurdish minority. The main Kurdish tribes are the Mamash and Zerza, while the Mangur and Mamachi tribe have had a historical presence in the town. Assyrians and Jews formerly populated the town as well. The Lazarist missionary movement led by Augustin-Pierre Cluzel was moreover active in the town in the 1840s. In the early 19th century, Naqadeh had 4 to 5 thousand Kurdish and Mukaddam Turkic families. In 1828, Prince Abbas Mirza resettled 800 Karapapakh families in Naqadeh. In the 1930s, Shahsevans from Hashtrud arrived to the town as well.

In 1979, it was estimated that Azerbaijanis constituted 65% of the population, while the remaining portion was Kurdish. In 1985, according to Richard Tapper, there were "Kurdicized Turks" in Naqadeh, some of whom were Sunni.

=== Population ===
At the time of the 2006 National Census, the city's population was 72,975 in 18,320 households. The following census in 2011 counted 75,550 people in 21,283 households. The 2016 census measured the population of the city as 81,598 people in 24,482 households.

== Geography ==
Naqadeh is situated on the bank of the Bayzawa river, encompassing an old artificial mound. The county in which Naqadeh is located is to the south-west of Lake Urmia on the lower course of the Gadar river.

Naqadeh is in the midst of the counties of Orumieh, Piranshahr, Mahabad and Oshnavieh, and is the axis of communications due to its position.

== Notable people ==
- Mohammad Oraz, alpinist
- Mustafa Hijri, politician

== See also ==
- Teppe Hasanlu

== Bibliography ==
- Amurian, Andre; Kasheff, Manouchehr (1986). "ARMENIANS OF MODERN IRAN". In Yarshater, Ehsan (ed.). Encyclopædia Iranica (Online ed.). Encyclopædia Iranica Foundation.
- Ishaya, Arianne (2010), Familiar Faces in Unfamiliar Places: Assyrians in the California Heartland 1911 - 2010
- Minorsky (2014), "Suldūz", Encyclopedia of Islam, Second Edition, doi:10.1163/1573-3912_islam_SIM_7169
- Mohséni, Chirine (2018), Dorronsoro, Gilles; Grojean, Olivier (eds.), The Instrumentalization of Ethnic Conflict by the State The Azeri-Kurdish Conflict in Iran, Oxford University Press, doi:10.1093/oso/9780190845780.001.0001, ISBN 9780190845780
