= Sultan Muhammad Shah =

Sultan Muhammad Shah may refer to:

- Sultan Muhammad Shah of Brunei (reigned 1368–1402)
- Sultan Muhammad Shah of Malacca (1424–1444)
- Sultan Muhammad Shah of Selangor (1804–1857)
- Sultan Aga Khan III (Muhammed Shah Aga Khan) (1877–1957), 48th Imam of the Nizari Ismaili community

== See also ==
- Muhammad Shah (disambiguation)
