= Solduz Rural District =

Rural district in West Azerbaijan province, Iran

Solduz Rural District Persian: دهستان سلدوز
- Rural District
- Location within Iran
- Coordinates: 37°02′N 45°20′E
- Country: Iran
- Province: West Azerbaijan
- County: Naqadeh
- District: Central
- Established: 1987
- Capital: Mirabad

Population (2016)
  - Total: 9,182
- Time zone: UTC+3:30 (IRST)

Solduz Rural District (Persian: دهستان سلدوز) is in the Central District of Naqadeh County, West Azerbaijan province, Iran. Its capital is the village of Mirabad.

== Demographics ==
=== Population ===
At the time of the 2006 National Census, the rural district's population was 8,282 in 1,759 households. There were 8,742 inhabitants in 2,396 households at the following census of 2011. The 2016 census measured the population of the rural district as 9,182 in 2,585 households. The most populous of its 37 villages was Chianeh, with 3,878 people.

=== Other villages in the rural district ===
- Aliabad
- Dilanchi Arkhi-ye Olya
- Dilanchi Arkhi-ye Sofla
- Halabi
- Ja Shiran
- Khalkhaneh
- Kuik
- Qaleh Lar
