= Beygom Qaleh Rural District =

Rural district in West Azerbaijan province, Iran

Beygom Qaleh Rural District Persian: دهستان بيگم قلعه
- Rural District
- Location within Iran
- Coordinates: 36°52′N 45°27′E
- Country: Iran
- Province: West Azerbaijan
- County: Naqadeh
- District: Central
- Established: 1987
- Capital: Beygom Qaleh

Population (2016)
  - Total: 15,744
- Time zone: UTC+3:30 (IRST)

Beygom Qaleh Rural District (Persian: دهستان بيگم قلعه) is in the Central District of Naqadeh County, West Azerbaijan province, Iran. Its capital is the village of Beygom Qaleh.

== Demographics ==
=== Population ===
At the time of the 2006 National Census, the rural district's population was 14,830 in 2,977 households. There were 15,992 inhabitants in 4,060 households at the following census of 2011. The 2016 census measured the population of the rural district as 15,744 in 4,291 households. The most populous of its 34 villages was Beygom Qaleh, with 1,727 people.

=== Other villages in the rural district ===
- Baliqchi
- Dasht-e Qureh
- Dizaj-e Bozorg
- Galvan
- Karvansara
- Khalifan
- Khalifehlu
- Kuzehgaran
- Masueh
- Mehmandar
- Qarna
- Rah Daneh
- Shaveleh
- Tazeh Qaleh
- Tupuzabad
