= Naqadeh County =

County in West Azerbaijan province, Iran

Naqadeh County Persian: شهرستان نقده
- County
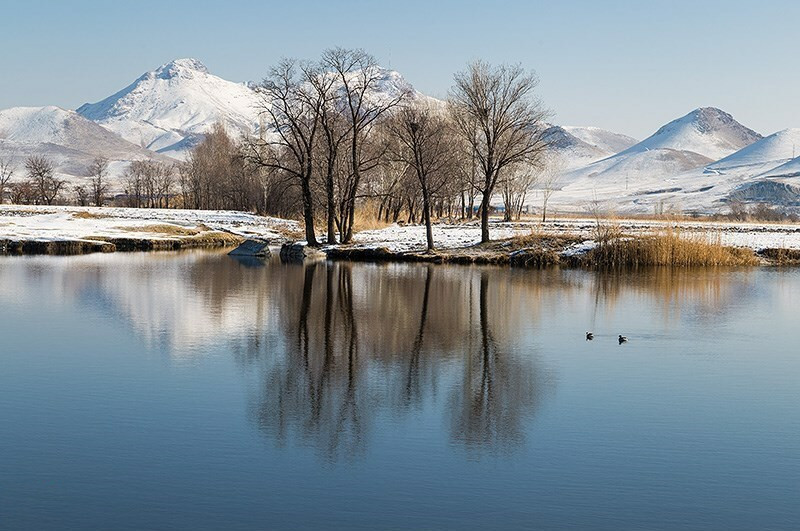
- Hasanlu Wetland in Naqadeh County

- Location of Naqadeh County in West Azerbaijan province (center left, pink)

- Location of West Azerbaijan province in Iran
- Coordinates: 37°03′N 45°27′E
- Country: Iran
- Province: West Azerbaijan
- Capital: Naqadeh
- Districts: Central, Mohammadyar

Population (2016)
  - Total: 127,671
- Time zone: UTC+3:30 (IRST)

Naqadeh County (Persian: شهرستان نقده) is in West Azerbaijan province, Iran. Its capital is the city of Naqadeh.

== Etymology ==
Naqadeh is the current name of the county (and its main city). The former name, Solduz (also spelled Sulduz [Kurdish: Sundus]), is in reference to the Mongol Sulduz tribe, and may have replaced an older name (now lost) during the reign of the Ilkhanid ruler Ghazan in 1303.

== History ==
In 1303, during the reign of Ilkhanid ruler Ghazan, the area comprising Naqadeh County was distributed in fiefs. According to the orientalist Vladimir Minorsky (died 1966), citing the 16th-century Kurdish prince and writer Sharafkhan Bidlisi, during the rule of the Turkoman Aq Qoyunlu and Qara Qoyunlu (in about the 15th century), "i.e. Jong after the Čōbānīs had disappeared", the Kurds of the Mukri (Mokri) tribe occupied the county of Naqadeh, and its old inhabitants were most likely "reduced to servitude". Minorsky, citing a mutilated and undated part of Bidlisi's work, narrates that a certain Budak of the Kurdish Baban tribe captured the county from the Qizilbash. This event may refer to one of the abrupt outbursts of skirmishes which occurred on the Safavid frontier.

In 1828, following the Treaty of Turkmenchay, Iranian crown prince Abbas Mirza handed over the territory of the county as a fief to 800 Turkic Qarapapaq families and these new settlers, in return, had to have 400 horsemen ready for disposal for the government. In this period, the county had a population of 4–5,000 of both Kurds and Muqaddam Shia Azerbaijanis. The town would gradually fall into the hands of the Azerbaijanis. The state-supported Qarapapaq consolidated their power quickly by attacking the Mangur and Zerza tribes.

By the early 20th century, the county consisted of 123 villages and small towns, which altogether numbered 8,000 families. The canton of Mamad-Shah is located in the southeastern-most corner of the county, the name of which is mentioned in the Sharafnama of Sharafkhan Bidlisi. In the early 20th century, the inhabitants of this canton were members of the Turkic Shamsaddihlu tribe. Members of the tribe had arrived in Qajar Iran with their chief Masi Beg, and were given 3 villages inhabited by 100 families of Kurdish peasants (raʿiyyat) by Abbas Mirza.

In the early 20th century, Sunni Kurds belonging to the Mamash, Zarza and Mukri tribes numbered 2,000 families within the county, comprising a quarter of the counties' total population. Ten villages within the county were entirely inhabited by these tribes (including Galvan, Vazneh, etc.) whereas eleven other villages (Chianeh, Naqadeh, Mameyand, etc.) were shared with the Qarapapaq.

The county, like that of Oshnavieh, is recorded as a Nestorian bishopric, but by 1914, there were only 80 Christian families left in its main town of Naqadeh. The Jews of the Naqadeh County, of which 120 families were located in the town of Naqadeh, were "probably the oldest element in the present population" of the county; virtually all have now emigrated to Israel.

During the Ottoman occupation from 1908 to 1912, the Azerbaijani population suffered considerably as they were seen as Iranian agents. The Ottomans attempted to destroy the tribal structure and free the rayah of the town. During World War I, the village of Haydarabad at Lake Urmia was turned into a Russian naval base, and a light railway was built through the county of Naqadeh. The territory that comprises the county would change hands between the Ottomans and the Russians in this period, until the Iranians took control in 1919.

== Demographics ==
=== Population ===
At the time of the 2006 National Census, the county's population was 117,831 in 27,937 households. The following census in 2011 counted 121,602 people in 33,684 households. The 2016 census measured the population of the county as 127,671 in 37,481 households.

=== Administrative divisions ===
Naqadeh County's population history and administrative structure over three consecutive censuses are shown in the following table.

Naqadeh County Population
Administrative Divisions	2006	2011	2016
Central District	96,087	100,284	106,524
Beygom Qaleh RD	14,830	15,992	15,744
Solduz RD	8,282	8,742	9,182
Naqadeh (city)	72,975	75,550	81,598
Mohammadyar District	21,744	21,318	21,147
Almahdi RD	8,542	8,278	7,959
Hasanlu RD	5,184	4,436	3,875
Mohammadyar (city)	8,018	8,604	9,313
Total	117,831	121,602	127,671
RD = Rural District

== Geography ==
Naqadeh County is located to the southwest of Lake Urmia on the lower course of the Gadir Chay River. The county is bordered to the west by Oshnavieh County, to the north by Dul Rural District of Urmia County, and to the south and east by Mahabad County.

== See also ==
Media related to Naqadeh County at Wikimedia Commons

== Sources ==
- Minorsky, "Suldūz", Encyclopedia of Islam, Second Edition, doi:10.1163/1573-3912_islam_SIM_7169
- Mohséni, Chirine (2018), Dorronsoro, Gilles; Grojean, Olivier (eds.), The Instrumentalization of Ethnic Conflict by the State The Azeri-Kurdish Conflict in Iran, Oxford University Press, doi:10.1093/oso/9780190845780.001.0001, ISBN 9780190845780
