= Central District (Naqadeh County) =

District in West Azerbaijan province, Iran

Central District (Naqadeh County) Persian: بخش مرکزی شهرستان نقده
- District
- Location within Iran
- Coordinates: 36°57′N 45°26′E
- Country: Iran
- Province: West Azerbaijan
- County: Naqadeh
- Capital: Naqadeh

Population (2016)
  - Total: 106,524
- Time zone: UTC+3:30 (IRST)

The Central District of Naqadeh County (Persian: بخش مرکزی شهرستان نقده) is in West Azerbaijan province, Iran. Its capital is the city of Naqadeh.

== Demographics ==
=== Population ===
At the time of the 2006 National Census, the district's population was 96,087 in 23,056 households. The following census in 2011 counted 100,284 people in 27,739 households. The 2016 census measured the population of the district as 106,524 inhabitants in 31,358 households.

=== Administrative divisions ===
Central District (Naqadeh County) Population
Administrative Divisions	2006	2011	2016
Beygom Qaleh RD	14,830	15,992	15,744
Solduz RD	8,282	8,742	9,182
Naqadeh (city)	72,975	75,550	81,598
Total	96,087	100,284	106,524
RD = Rural District
