= Dargah, Iran =

Dargah or Darageh or Dargeh or Dergah (Persian: درگه or درگاه), also rendered as Darkeh and Derkah, may refer to:

- Dargah, Astaneh-ye Ashrafiyeh, Gilan Province (درگاه - Dargāh)
- Dargah, Rudsar, Gilan Province (درگاه - Dargāh)
- Dargah, Hormozgan (درگاه - Dargāh)
- Darageh, Malekshahi, Ilam Province
- Dargeh, Dalahu, Kermanshah Province (درگه - Dargeh)
- Dargah, Gilan-e Gharb, Kermanshah Province (درگه - Dargah)
- Dergah, Ravansar, Kermanshah Province (درگه - Dergah)
- Dargeh-ye Cheshmeh Said, Kermanshah Province
- Dargeh-ye Gholam Ali, Kermanshah Province
- Dargeh-ye Khalifeh Qoli, Kermanshah Province
- Darageh-ye Molla Ali Karam, Kermanshah Province
- Dargah-e Sheykhan (disambiguation), places in Kurdistan Province
- Dargah-e Soleyman, Kurdistan Province
- Dergah, West Azerbaijan
- Darageh-ye Oros Khan, West Azerbaijan Province
- Darageh-ye Lotfollah, West Azerbaijan Province

== See also ==
- Darakeh (disambiguation)
