= Aminul =

Aminul (Bengali: আমিনুল) is a given name. Notable people with the name include:

- Aminul Haque Badsha (1944–2015), Bangladesh journalist, deputy secretary of the President of Bangladesh
- Aminul Islam Badsha (1929–1998), Bangladeshi language movement activist and freedom fighter
- Md Aminul Haque Bhuyan (born 1952), Bangladeshi academic, Vice-chancellor of Bangladesh Islami University
- Aminul Islam Chowdhury (born 1921), Bangladeshi politician and businessman
- Aminul Haque (Attorney General) (1931–1995), Bangladeshi lawyer
- Sikdar Aminul Haq (1942–2003), Bangladeshi poet
- A. K. M. Aminul Haque (1929–2022), Bangladeshi marine biologist
- AKM Aminul Haque (officer), major general of the Bangladesh Army
- Aminul Haque (actor) (1921–2011), Bangladeshi actor
- Aminul Haque (footballer) (born 1980), former Bangladeshi professional footballer
- Aminul Haque (politician) (1942–2019), Bangladesh Nationalist Party politician
- Syed Aminul Haque, Pakistani politician, member of the National Assembly of Pakistan
- Aminul Hoque (writer), MBE, Bangladeshi-born British lecturer and writer
- Aminul Islam (academic) (1935–2017), Bangladeshi academic
- Aminul Islam (artist) (1931–2011), Bangladeshi artist
- Aminul Islam (Assam politician), Indian politician
- Aminul Islam (Bangladeshi politician) (born 1969), Bangladesh Nationalist Party politician
- Aminul Islam (cricketer, born 1968) (born 1968), Bangladeshi cricketer and captain
- Aminul Islam (cricketer, born 1975) (born 1975), Bangladeshi cricketer
- Aminul Islam (cricketer, born 1999) (born 1999), Bangladeshi cricketer
- Aminul Islam (Indian politician, born 1971) (born 1972), All India United Democratic Front politician from Assam
- Aminul Islam (Indian politician, born 1975) (born 1975), Indian politician and advocate
- Aminul Islam (poet) (born 1963), poet and essayist from Bangladesh
- Aminul Islam (trade unionist) (1973–2012), Bangladeshi trade unionist murdered in 2012
- K.M. Aminul Islam, former Jatiya Party member of parliament
- M. Aminul Islam, former Bangladeshi career diplomat
- Md. Aminul Islam (judge), Justice of the High Court Division of the Bangladesh Supreme Court
- Md. Aminul Islam (politician), politician and member of parliament
- Syed Aminul Hasan Jafri, Indian journalist and Member of Legislative Council
- Aminul Karim (born 1955), retired lieutenant general of the Bangladesh Army
- Aminul Haque Laskar (born 1966), Indian politician of Indian National Congress from Assam
- Aminul Islam Danesh Mia (1919–2006), Bangladesh Awami League politician and member of parliament
- Aminul Islam Mintu (1939–2020), Bangladeshi film editor
- Aminul Huq Moni (1949–2015), sports organiser and media executive of Bangladesh
- Aminul Islam Sarker, Jatiya Party politician, former member of parliament

== See also ==
- Aminul Haque (name), male Muslim given name, meaning "trustee of the truth"
- Aminul Islam (disambiguation)
- Aminal
- Aminlu (disambiguation)
- Aminullah
