= Sheykh Ahmad =

Sheykh Ahmad or Sheykhahmad (Persian: شيخ احمد) may refer to:

== Places ==
- Sheykh Ahmad, Ardabil
- Sheykh Ahmad, East Azerbaijan
- Sheykh Ahmad, Meyaneh, East Azerbaijan Province
- Sheykh Ahmad, Khuzestan
- Sheykh Ahmad, Shush, Khuzestan Province
- Sheykh Ahmad, West Azerbaijan

== People ==
- Dhondia Wagh, who was given the name "Shaikh Ahmad" after his conversion to Islam
