= Barani =

Barani may refer to:

== Places ==
- Barani, Golestan, a village in Golestan Province, Iran
- Barani, Hormozgan, a village in Hormozgan Province, Iran
- Barani, Lorestan, a village in Lorestan Province, Iran
- Barani, Sistan and Baluchestan, a village in Sistan and Baluchestan Province, Iran
- Barani Department, in Burkina Faso
- Barani-ye Ajam, a village in West Azerbaijan Province, Iran
- Barani-ye Kord, a village in West Azerbaijan Province, Iran

== Other uses ==
- A Muslim surname derived from either the natives of the Baran district during Delhi Sultanate. They were amongst the earliest converts to Islam in Indian subcontinent. They were well known and respected for their valor and intelligence and occupied most of the high positions in the early Delhi Sultanate, although many fell in favour in later centuries.
- Barani (website), website devoted to the history of Aboriginal people in the City of Sydney area
- Barani land, a term used for the rain-fed agricultural land in India
- Vipera barani, a venomous snake endemic to Turkey
- Ziauddin Barani (1285–1358 CE), a Muslim political thinker of the Delhi Sultanate in northern India
- Barani flip, an acrobatic flip used in gymnastics and martial arts
