= Darakeh (disambiguation) =

Darakeh is a neighbourhood of Tehran.

Darakeh or Derkeh or Derkah (Persian: دركه) may also refer to:

- Darakeh, Chaharmahal and Bakhtiari
- Derkeh, Kermanshah
- Darakeh, Gilan-e Gharb, Kermanshah Province
- Darakeh-ye Oros Khan, West Azerbaijan Province
- Darakeh-ye Lotfollah, West Azerbaijan Province
- Dargah, Iran (disambiguation)
