= Hasanlu (disambiguation) =

Hasanlu is an archaeological site near Lake Urmia, Iran.

Hasanlu (Persian: حسنلو) may also refer to various places in Iran:

- Hasanlu, Ardabil
- Hasanlu, East Azerbaijan
- Hasanlu, Naqadeh, West Azerbaijan Province
- Hasanlu, Oshnavieh, West Azerbaijan Province
- Hasanlu, Shahin Dezh, West Azerbaijan Province
- Hasanlu, Urmia, West Azerbaijan Province
- Hasanlu, Zanjan
- Hasanlu Rural District, in West Azerbaijan Province
