= Shirin Bolagh =

Shirin Bolagh (Persian: شيرين بلاغ), also rendered as Shirinbolaq, may refer to various places in Iran:

- Shirin Bolagh, Ardabil
- Shirin Bolagh, East Azerbaijan
- Shirin Bolagh, Bostanabad, East Azerbaijan Province
- Shirin Bolagh, Kurdistan
- Shirin Bolagh, Markazi
- Shirin Bolagh, Chaypareh, West Azerbaijan Province
- Shirin Bolagh, Naqadeh, West Azerbaijan Province

== See also ==
- Şirinbulaq, Azerbaijan
