= Hajji Baghlu =

Hajji Baghlu حاجي باغلو
- Village
- Location within Iran
- Coordinates: 37°00′20″N 45°26′39″E
- Country: Iran
- Province: West Azerbaijan
- County: Naqadeh
- Bakhsh: Mohammadyar
- Rural District: Hasanlu

Population (2006)
  - Total: 61
- Time zone: UTC+3:30 (IRST)
  - Summer (DST): UTC+4:30 (IRDT)

Hajji Baghlu (Persian: حاجي باغلو, also Romanized as Ḩājjī Bāghlū and Ḩājjībāghlū) is a village in Hasanlu Rural District, Mohammadyar District, Naqadeh County, West Azerbaijan Province, Iran. At the 2006 census, its population was 61, in 15 families.
