= Aminul Islam =

Aminul Islam (Bengali: আমিনুল ইসলাম) may refer to:

- Aminul Islam (artist) (1931–2011), Bangladeshi artist
- Aminul Islam (academic) (1935–2017), Bangladeshi soil scientist
- Aminul Islam (Bangladeshi politician), politician born in 1969
- Aminul Islam (cricketer, born 1975), Bangladeshi cricketer
- Aminul Islam (cricketer, born 1999), Bangladeshi cricketer
- Aminul Islam (Indian politician, born 1972), member of the Assam Legislative Assembly
- Aminul Islam (Indian politician, born 1975), All India United Democratic Front politician
- Aminul Islam (poet) (born 1963), Bangladeshi poet
- Aminul Islam (trade unionist) (1972–2012), Bangladeshi trade unionist
- Aminul Islam Bulbul, Bangladeshi cricketer and cricket administrator
- Aminul Islam Chowdhury (born 1921), Bangladeshi politician and businessman
- M. Aminul Islam, Bangladeshi diplomat
- Md. Aminul Islam (politician), Bangladeshi politician
