= Saral =

Saral may refer to:

Places

- Saral, Bhiwani, a village in the Bhiwani district of the Indian state of Haryana
- Saral, Chakwal, a village in the Chakwal district of the Pakistani province of Punjab
- Saral, Banas Kantha a village in the Banas Kantha District of the Indian state of Gujarat
- Saral, Iran (disambiguation), a number of Iranian villages
- Saral, Mewat, a village in the Nuh district of the Indian state of Haryana
- Saral, Raigarh, a village in the Raigarh district of the Indian state of Maharashtra
- Saral, the former name of the town of Nor Khachakap in Armenia
- Saral Lake, a lake in KPK province of Pakistan

Other

- SARAL, a cooperative technology mission of the Indian Space Research Organisation (ISRO) and CNES (Space Agency of France)
