= Shunqar =

Shunqar شونقار
- Village
- Location within Iran
- Coordinates: 36°59′41″N 45°28′58″E
- Country: Iran
- Province: West Azerbaijan
- County: Naqadeh
- Bakhsh: Mohammadyar
- Rural District: Hasanlu

Population (2006)
  - Total: 134
- Time zone: UTC+3:30 (IRST)
  - Summer (DST): UTC+4:30 (IRDT)

Shunqar (Persian: شونقار, also Romanized as Shūnqār) is a village in Hasanlu Rural District, Mohammadyar District, Naqadeh County, West Azerbaijan Province, Iran. At the 2006 census, its population was 134, in 34 families.
