= Tabieh =

Tabieh تابيه
- Village
- Location within Iran
- Coordinates: 36°59′29″N 45°27′27″E
- Country: Iran
- Province: West Azerbaijan
- County: Naqadeh
- Bakhsh: Mohammadyar
- Rural District: Hasanlu

Population (2006)
  - Total: 73
- Time zone: UTC+3:30 (IRST)
  - Summer (DST): UTC+4:30 (IRDT)

Tabieh (Persian: تابيه, also Romanized as Tābīeh) is a village in Hasanlu Rural District, Mohammadyar District, Naqadeh County, West Azerbaijan Province, Iran. At the 2006 census, its population was 73, in 17 families.
