= Ajamlu =

Ajamlu عجملو
- Village
- Location within Iran
- Coordinates: 36°58′19″N 45°27′06″E
- Country: Iran
- Province: West Azerbaijan
- County: Naqadeh
- Bakhsh: Mohammadyar
- Rural District: Hasanlu

Population (2006)
  - Total: 128
- Time zone: UTC+3:30 (IRST)
  - Summer (DST): UTC+4:30 (IRDT)

Ajamlu (Persian: عجملو, also Romanized as ‘Ajamlū) is a village in Hasanlu Rural District, Mohammadyar District, Naqadeh County, West Azerbaijan Province, Iran. At the 2006 census, its population was 128, in 34 families.
