= Hajji Firuz, Iran =

Hajji Firuz حاجي فيروز
- Village
- Location within Iran
- Coordinates: 36°59′39″N 45°28′10″E
- Country: Iran
- Province: West Azerbaijan
- County: Naqadeh
- Bakhsh: Mohammadyar
- Rural District: Hasanlu

Population (2006)
  - Total: 119
- Time zone: UTC+3:30 (IRST)
  - Summer (DST): UTC+4:30 (IRDT)

Hajji Firuz or Ḩājjī Fīrūz (Persian: حاجي فيروز) is a village in the Hasanlu Rural District of the Mohammadyar District of Naqadeh County in Iran's West Azerbaijan Province. At the 2006 census, its population was 119, living in 28 families.

It is the site of the discovery of pots dating to c. 5000 BC containing remnants of a retsina, the earliest-known evidence of wine cultivation outside Georgia.
