= Qarah Qassab =

Village in West Azerbaijan province, Iran

Qarah Qassab Persian: قره قصاب
- Village
- Location within Iran
- Coordinates: 36°57′09″N 45°33′11″E
- Country: Iran
- Province: West Azerbaijan
- County: Naqadeh
- District: Mohammadyar
- Rural District: Almahdi

Population (2016)
  - Total: 733
- Time zone: UTC+3:30 (IRST)

Qarah Qassab (Persian: قره قصاب) (Note: Also romanized as Qarah Qaşşāb and Qareh Qaşşāb) is a village in Almahdi Rural District of Mohammadyar District in Naqadeh County, West Azerbaijan province, Iran.

== Demographics ==
=== Population ===
At the time of the 2006 National Census, the village's population was 731 in 157 households. The following census in 2011 counted 705 people in 178 households. The 2016 census measured the population of the village as 733 people in 162 households.
