= Qalat, Naqadeh =

Village in West Azerbaijan province, Iran

Qalat Persian: قلات
- Village
- Location within Iran
- Coordinates: 36°59′05″N 45°36′52″E
- Country: Iran
- Province: West Azerbaijan
- County: Naqadeh
- District: Mohammadyar
- Rural District: Almahdi

Population (2016)
  - Total: 144
- Time zone: UTC+3:30 (IRST)

Qalat (Persian: قلات) (Note: Also romanized as Qalāt; also known as Qalātān) is a village in Almahdi Rural District of Mohammadyar District in Naqadeh County, West Azerbaijan province, Iran.

== Demographics ==
=== Population ===
At the time of the 2006 National Census, the village's population was 171 in 30 households. The following census in 2011 counted 165 people in 40 households. The 2016 census measured the population of the village as 144 people in 31 households.
