= Gol, Naqadeh =

Village in West Azerbaijan province, Iran

Gol Persian: گل
- Village
- Location within Iran
- Coordinates: 37°00′27″N 45°32′21″E
- Country: Iran
- Province: West Azerbaijan
- County: Naqadeh
- District: Mohammadyar
- Rural District: Almahdi

Population (2016)
  - Total: 810
- Time zone: UTC+3:30 (IRST)

Gol (Persian: گل) (Note: Also known as Gūl; in Armenian: Քիօհլ) is a village in Almahdi Rural District of Mohammadyar District in Naqadeh County, West Azerbaijan province, Iran.

== Demographics ==
=== Population ===
At the time of the 2006 National Census, the village's population was 827 in 146 households. The following census in 2011 counted 805 people in 226 households. The 2016 census measured the population of the village as 810 people in 248 households.
