= Dash-e Darageh =

Village in West Azerbaijan province, Iran

Dash-e Darageh Persian: داش درگه
- Village
- Location within Iran
- Coordinates: 36°58′38″N 45°33′39″E
- Country: Iran
- Province: West Azerbaijan
- County: Naqadeh
- District: Mohammadyar
- Rural District: Almahdi

Population (2016)
  - Total: 737
- Time zone: UTC+3:30 (IRST)

Dash-e Darageh (Persian: داش درگه) (Note: Also romanized as Dāsh-e Darageh) is a village in Almahdi Rural District of Mohammadyar District in Naqadeh County, West Azerbaijan province, Iran.

== Demographics ==
=== Population ===
At the time of the 2006 National Census, the village's population was 715 in 140 households. The following census in 2011 counted 645 people in 193 households. The 2016 census measured the population of the village as 737 people in 186 households.
