= Shirin Bolagh, Naqadeh =

Shirin Bolagh شيرين بلاغ
- Village
- Location within Iran
- Coordinates: 37°08′13″N 45°25′51″E
- Country: Iran
- Province: West Azerbaijan
- County: Naqadeh
- Bakhsh: Mohammadyar
- Rural District: Hasanlu

Population (2006)
  - Total: 92
- Time zone: UTC+3:30 (IRST)
  - Summer (DST): UTC+4:30 (IRDT)

Shirin Bolagh (Persian: شيرين بلاغ, also Romanized as Shīrīn Bolāgh) is a village in Hasanlu Rural District, Mohammadyar District, Naqadeh County, West Azerbaijan Province, Iran. At the 2006 census, its population was 92, in 23 families.
