= Shahrak-e Mehdi =

Village in West Azerbaijan province, Iran

Shahrak-e Mehdi Persian: شهرك مهدي
- Village
- Location within Iran
- Coordinates: 36°57′59″N 45°34′56″E
- Country: Iran
- Province: West Azerbaijan
- County: Naqadeh
- District: Mohammadyar
- Rural District: Almahdi

Population (2016)
  - Total: 659
- Time zone: UTC+3:30 (IRST)

Shahrak-e Mehdi (Persian: شهرك مهدي) (Note: Also romanized as Shahrak-e Mehdī) is a village in, and the capital of, Almahdi Rural District in Mohammadyar District of Naqadeh County, West Azerbaijan province, Iran.

== Demographics ==
=== Population ===
At the time of the 2006 National Census, the village's population was 689 in 168 households. The following census in 2011 counted 715 people in 183 households. The 2016 census measured the population of the village as 659 people in 190 households.
