= Azim Khanlu =

Village in West Azerbaijan province, Iran

Azim Khanlu Persian: عظيم خانلو
- Village
- Location within Iran
- Coordinates: 37°00′15″N 45°26′12″E
- Country: Iran
- Province: West Azerbaijan
- County: Naqadeh
- District: Mohammadyar
- Rural District: Hasanlu

Population (2016)
  - Total: 148
- Time zone: UTC+3:30 (IRST)

Azim Khanlu (Persian: عظيم خانلو) (Note: Also romanized as ‘Az̧īm Khānlū and ‘Az̧īmkhānlū) is a village in Hasanlu Rural District of Mohammadyar District in Naqadeh County, West Azerbaijan province, Iran.

== Demographics ==
=== Population ===
At the time of the 2006 National Census, the village's population was 163 in 34 households. The following census in 2011 counted 143 people in 45 households. The 2016 census measured the population of the village as 148 people in 48 households.
