= Aqa Beyglu, West Azerbaijan =

Village in West Azerbaijan province, Iran

Aqa Beyglu Persian: اقابيگلو
- Village
- Location within Iran
- Coordinates: 36°58′31″N 45°28′47″E
- Country: Iran
- Province: West Azerbaijan
- County: Naqadeh
- District: Mohammadyar
- Rural District: Hasanlu

Population (2016)
  - Total: 290
- Time zone: UTC+3:30 (IRST)

Aqa Beyglu (Persian: اقابيگلو, romanized: Āqā Beyglū) (Note: Also known as Āqā Beglū and Aḡbeglū.) is a village in Hasanlu Rural District of Mohammadyar District in Naqadeh County, West Azerbaijan province, Iran. The village has at least one Armenian church.

== Demographics ==
=== Population ===
At the time of the 2006 National Census, the village's population was 384 in 97 households. The following census in 2011 counted 315 people in 93 households. The 2016 census measured the population of the village as 290 people in 101 households.

== Bibliography ==
- Amurian, Andre; Kasheff, Manouchehr (1986). "ARMENIANS OF MODERN IRAN". In Yarshater, Ehsan (ed.). Encyclopædia Iranica (Online ed.). Encyclopædia Iranica Foundation.
