= Gerdeh Qit =

Village in West Azerbaijan province, Iran

Gerdeh Qit Persian: گرده قيط
- Village
- Location within Iran
- Coordinates: 37°00′08″N 45°37′52″E
- Country: Iran
- Province: West Azerbaijan
- County: Naqadeh
- District: Mohammadyar
- Rural District: Almahdi

Population (2016)
  - Total: 756
- Time zone: UTC+3:30 (IRST)

Gerdeh Qit (Persian: گرده قيط) (Note: Also romanized as Gerdeh Qīţ and Gerdeh Qīt) is a village in Almahdi Rural District of Mohammadyar District in Naqadeh County, West Azerbaijan province, Iran.

== Demographics ==
=== Population ===
At the time of the 2006 National Census, the village's population was 752 in 119 households. The following census in 2011 counted 763 people in 193 households. The 2016 census measured the population of the village as 756 people in 176 households.
