= Saral, Iran =

Saral (Kurdish: ساراڵ) (Persian: سارال) in Kurdistan Iran may refer to:

- Saral-e Olya, West Azerbaijan Province
- Saral-e Sofla, West Azerbaijan Province
- Saral District, in Kurdistan Province
- Saral Rural District, in Kurdistan Province
