= Yadegarlu =

Village in West Azerbaijan province, Iran

Yadegarlu Persian: يادگارلو
- Village
- Location within Iran
- Coordinates: 37°02′23″N 45°31′40″E
- Country: Iran
- Province: West Azerbaijan
- County: Naqadeh
- District: Mohammadyar
- Rural District: Almahdi

Population (2016)
  - Total: 452
- Time zone: UTC+3:30 (IRST)

Yadegarlu (Persian: يادگارلو) (Note: Also romanized as Yādegārlū) is a village in Almahdi Rural District of Mohammadyar District in Naqadeh County, West Azerbaijan province, Iran.

== Demographics ==
=== Population ===
At the time of the 2006 National Census, the village's population was 607 in 137 households. The following census in 2011 counted 532 people in 155 households. The 2016 census measured the population of the village as 452 people in 151 households.
