= Tazeh Kand-e Jabal =

Village in West Azerbaijan province, Iran

Tazeh Kand-e Jabal Persian: تازه كندجبل
- Village
- Location within Iran
- Country: Iran
- Province: West Azerbaijan
- County: Naqadeh
- District: Mohammadyar
- Rural District: Almahdi

Population (2016)
  - Total: 306
- Time zone: UTC+3:30 (IRST)

Tazeh Kand-e Jabal (Persian: تازه كندجبل) (Note: Also romanized as Tāzeh Kand-e Jabal; also known as Tāzeh Kand-e Bolbol) is a village in Almahdi Rural District of Mohammadyar District in Naqadeh County, West Azerbaijan province, Iran.

== Demographics ==
=== Population ===
At the time of the 2006 National Census, the village's population was 377 in 90 households. The following census in 2011 counted 329 people in 90 households. The 2016 census measured the population of the village as 306 people in 80 households.
