= Farrokhzad, West Azerbaijan =

Village in West Azerbaijan province, Iran

Farrokhzad Persian: فرخ زاد
- Village
- Location within Iran
- Coordinates: 36°57′40″N 45°29′42″E
- Country: Iran
- Province: West Azerbaijan
- County: Naqadeh
- District: Mohammadyar
- Rural District: Almahdi

Population (2016)
  - Total: 887
- Time zone: UTC+3:30 (IRST)

Farrokhzad (Persian: فرخ زاد) (Note: Also romanized as Farokhzād and Farrokhzād) is a village in Almahdi Rural District of Mohammadyar District in Naqadeh County, West Azerbaijan province, Iran.

== Demographics ==
=== Population ===
At the time of the 2006 National Census, the village's population was 1,077 in 264 households. The following census in 2011 counted 995 people in 284 households. The 2016 census measured the population of the village as 887 people in 275 households. It was the most populous village in its rural district.
