= Nezamabad, Naqadeh =

Village in West Azerbaijan province, Iran

Nezamabad Persian: نظاماباد
- Village
- Location within Iran
- Coordinates: 36°57′09″N 45°31′35″E
- Country: Iran
- Province: West Azerbaijan
- County: Naqadeh
- District: Mohammadyar
- Rural District: Almahdi

Population (2016)
  - Total: 395
- Time zone: UTC+3:30 (IRST)

Nezamabad (Persian: نظاماباد) (Note: Also romanized as Nez̧āmābād) is a village in Almahdi Rural District of Mohammadyar District in Naqadeh County, West Azerbaijan province, Iran.

== Demographics ==
=== Population ===
At the time of the 2006 National Census, the village's population was 484 in 117 households. The following census in 2011 counted 327 people in 88 households. The 2016 census measured the population of the village as 395 people in 104 households.
