= Vazneh =

Village in West Azerbaijan province, Iran

Vazneh Persian: وزنه
- Village
- Location within Iran
- Coordinates: 37°05′10″N 45°21′12″E
- Country: Iran
- Province: West Azerbaijan
- County: Naqadeh
- District: Mohammadyar
- Rural District: Hasanlu

Population (2016)
  - Total: 272
- Time zone: UTC+3:30 (IRST)

Vazneh (Persian: وزنه) is a village in Hasanlu Rural District of Mohammadyar District in Naqadeh County, West Azerbaijan province, Iran.

== Demographics ==
=== Ethnicity ===
The village is populated by Kurds.

=== Population ===
At the time of the 2006 National Census, the village's population was 460 in 85 households. The following census in 2011 counted 329 people in 94 households. The 2016 census measured the population of the village as 272 people in 83 households.
