= Amanullah =

Amanullah or Amanallah is a male Muslim given name (Arabic: أمان الله) meaning the trust or protection of God. It may refer to:

- Amānullāh Khān (1892–1960), ruler of Afghanistan from 1919 to 1929
- Amanullah Khan (disambiguation), several other people called Amanullah Khan
- Amanullah Jahanbani (1895–1974), Iranian senior general of Reza Shah Pahlavi
- Amanullah Sailaab Sapi (1933–1979), Afghan poet and writer
- Amanullah Asaduzzaman (1942–1969), Bengali student activist killed by police
- Amanallah Alimoradi, Iranian Cleric
- Azzedine Amanallah (born 1956), Moroccan footballer
- Amanullah (Bagram detainee), Afghan, captured in early 2004, and held in extrajudicial detention in the United States Bagram detention facility
- Amanullah Zadran, former Taliban leader, Pashtun, Afghan government minister
- Amanullah Khan Niazi, the deputy superintendent of Central Prison Karachi
- Amanullah Khan Jadoon, former MPA and Federal Minister of Khyber Pakhtunkhwa

== See also ==
- Aminullah
- List of Arabic theophoric names
