= Shirvan Shahlu-ye Olya =

Village in West Azerbaijan province, Iran

Shirvan Shahlu-ye Olya Persian: شيروان شاهلوي عليا
- Village
- Location within Iran
- Coordinates: 37°07′24″N 45°24′53″E
- Country: Iran
- Province: West Azerbaijan
- County: Naqadeh
- District: Mohammadyar
- Rural District: Hasanlu

Population (2016)
  - Total: 169
- Time zone: UTC+3:30 (IRST)

Shirvan Shahlu-ye Olya (Persian: شيروان شاهلوي عليا) (Note: Also romanized as Shīrvān Shāhlū-ye ‘Olyā; formerly known as Shura Kandi (شوراكندي), also romanized as Shūrā Kandī and Shūrākandī; and Shirvan Shahlu (شيروان شاملو), also romanized as Shīrvānshāhlū; also known as Shiranshalio) is a village in Hasanlu Rural District of Mohammadyar District in Naqadeh County, West Azerbaijan province, Iran.

== Demographics ==
=== Population ===
At the time of the 2006 National Census, the village's population, as Shura Kandi, was 173 in 33 households. The following census in 2011 counted 173 people in 49 households, by which time the village was listed as Shirvan Shahlu. The 2016 census measured the population of the village as 169 people in 52 households, when it was listed as Shirvan Shahlu-ye Olya.
