= Eslamabad, Naqadeh =

Village in West Azerbaijan province, Iran

Eslamabad Persian: اسلام اباد
- Village
- Location within Iran
- Coordinates: 36°58′49″N 45°25′31″E
- Country: Iran
- Province: West Azerbaijan
- County: Naqadeh
- District: Mohammadyar
- Rural District: Hasanlu

Population (2016)
  - Total: 113
- Time zone: UTC+3:30 (IRST)

Eslamabad (Persian: اسلام اباد) (Note: Also romanized as Eslāmābād; also known as Dalmeh) is a village in Hasanlu Rural District of Mohammadyar District in Naqadeh County, West Azerbaijan province, Iran.

== Demographics ==
=== Population ===
At the time of the 2006 National Census, the village's population was 238 in 60 households. The following census in 2011 counted 161 people in 45 households. The 2016 census measured the population of the village as 113 people in 37 households.
