= Adeh, Naqadeh =

Village in West Azerbaijan province, Iran

Adeh Persian: اده
- Village
- Location within Iran
- Coordinates: 36°58′09″N 45°36′24″E
- Country: Iran
- Province: West Azerbaijan
- County: Naqadeh
- District: Mohammadyar
- Rural District: Almahdi

Population (2016)
  - Total: 150
- Time zone: UTC+3:30 (IRST)

Adeh (Persian: اده) (Note: Also romanized as Ādeh) is a village in Almahdi Rural District of Mohammadyar District in Naqadeh County, West Azerbaijan province, Iran.

== Demographics ==
=== Population ===
At the time of the 2006 National Census, the village's population was 218 in 36 households. The following census in 2011 counted 199 people in 52 households. The 2016 census measured the population of the village as 150 people in 37 households.
