= Aminlu, West Azerbaijan =

Aminlu امينلو
- Village
- Location within Iran
- Coordinates: 37°00′08″N 45°27′21″E
- Country: Iran
- Province: West Azerbaijan
- County: Naqadeh
- Bakhsh: Mohammadyar
- Rural District: Hasanlu

Population (2006)
  - Total: 99
- Time zone: UTC+3:30 (IRST)
  - Summer (DST): UTC+4:30 (IRDT)

Aminlu (Persian: امينلو, also Romanized as Amīnlū) is a village in Hasanlu Rural District, Mohammadyar District, Naqadeh County, West Azerbaijan Province, Iran. At the 2006 census, its population was 99, in 25 families.
