= Kahriz-e Ajam =

Village in West Azerbaijan province, Iran

Kahriz-e Ajam Persian: كهريزعجم
- Village
- Location within Iran
- Coordinates: 37°03′23″N 45°23′33″E
- Country: Iran
- Province: West Azerbaijan
- County: Naqadeh
- District: Mohammadyar
- Rural District: Hasanlu

Population (2016)
  - Total: 234
- Time zone: UTC+3:30 (IRST)

Kahriz-e Ajam (Persian: كهريزعجم) (Note: Also romanized as Kahrīz-e ‘Ajam; also known as Kahrīzeh-ye ‘Ajam) is a village in Hasanlu Rural District of Mohammadyar District in Naqadeh County, West Azerbaijan province, Iran.

== Demographics ==
=== Population ===
At the time of the 2006 National Census, the village's population was 441 in 109 households. The following census in 2011 counted 351 people in 104 households. The 2016 census measured the population of the village as 234 people in 84 households.
