= Dargah-e Sheykhan =

Dargah-e Sheykhan or Dargah-e Shaykhan or Dargah-i-Shaikhan (Persian: درگاه شيخان) may refer to:

- Dargah-e Sheykhan, Baneh
- Dargah-e Sheykhan, Marivan
