= Mameyand =

Village in West Azerbaijan province, Iran

Mameyand Persian: مميند
- Village
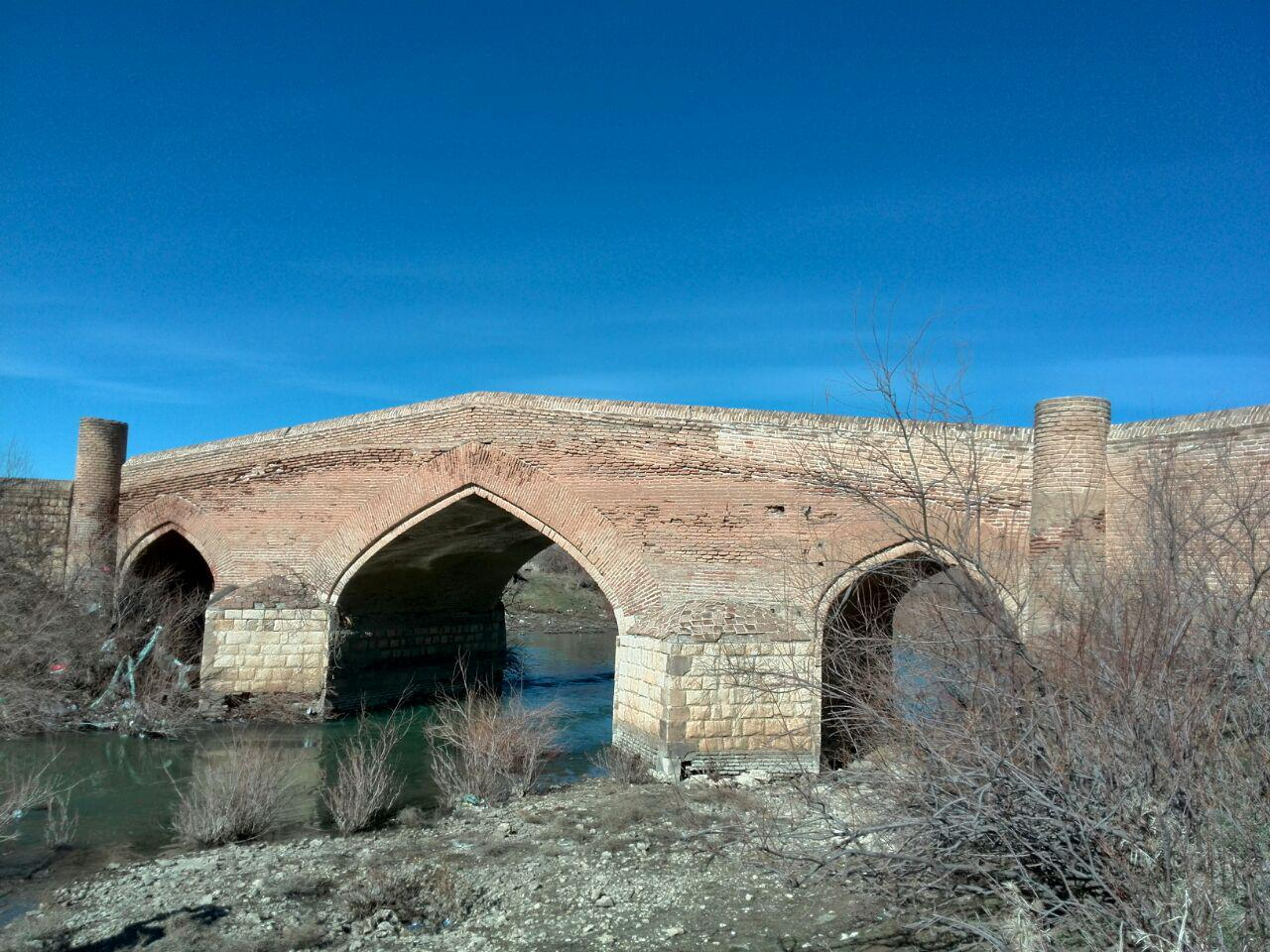
- Bridge in the village of Mameyand

- Location within Iran
- Coordinates: 36°59′30″N 45°39′13″E
- Country: Iran
- Province: West Azerbaijan
- County: Naqadeh
- District: Mohammadyar
- Rural District: Almahdi

Population (2016)
  - Total: 788
- Time zone: UTC+3:30 (IRST)

Mameyand (Persian: مميند) (Note: Also known as Ma‘īnad, Mamevand, and Mamīneh (Kurdish: مەمێند)) is a village in Almahdi Rural District of Mohammadyar District in Naqadeh County, West Azerbaijan province, Iran.

== Demographics ==
=== Ethnicity ===
The village is populated by Azerbaijanis and Kurds.

=== Population ===
At the time of the 2006 National Census, the village's population was 788 in 136 households. The following census in 2011 counted 812 people in 229 households. The 2016 census measured the population of the village as 788 people in 196 households.
