= Sheykh Ahmad, West Azerbaijan =

Village in West Azerbaijan province, Iran

Sheykh Ahmad Persian: شيخ احمد
- Village
- Location within Iran
- Coordinates: 37°01′21″N 45°30′02″E
- Country: Iran
- Province: West Azerbaijan
- County: Naqadeh
- District: Mohammadyar
- Rural District: Hasanlu

Population (2016)
  - Total: 370
- Time zone: UTC+3:30 (IRST)

Sheykh Ahmad (Persian: شيخ احمد) (Note: Also romanized as Sheykh Aḩmad) is a village in Hasanlu Rural District of Mohammadyar District in Naqadeh County, West Azerbaijan province, Iran.

== Demographics ==
=== Population ===
At the time of the 2006 National Census, the village's population was 468 in 105 households. The following census in 2011 counted 413 people in 112 households. The 2016 census measured the population of the village as 370 people in 109 households.
