= Aminlu =

Aminlu (Persian: امينلو) may refer to:

- Aminlu, Ardabil
- Aminlu, West Azerbaijan
