= Hasanlu, Naqadeh =

Village in West Azerbaijan province, Iran

Hasanlu Hasanli Persian: حسنلو Azerbaijani: حسنلی‌
- Village
- Location within Iran
- Coordinates: 37°00′15″N 45°27′48″E
- Country: Iran
- Province: West Azerbaijan
- County: Naqadeh
- District: Mohammadyar
- Rural District: Hasanlu

Population (2016)
  - Total: 1,277
- Time zone: UTC+3:30 (IRST)

Hasanlu (Persian: حسنلو) (Note: Also romanized as Hasanlū) or Hasanli (Azerbaijani: حسنلی‌, romanized: Həsənli) is a village in, and the capital of, Hasanlu Rural District in Mohammadyar District of Naqadeh County, West Azerbaijan province, Iran.

== Demographics ==
=== Population ===
At the time of the 2006 National Census, the village's population was 1,264 in 289 households. The following census in 2011 counted 1,273 people in 364 households. The 2016 census measured the population of the village as 1,277 people in 381 households. It was the most populous village in its rural district.
