= Mohammadyar =

City in West Azerbaijan province, Iran

Mohammadyar Persian: محمديار
- City
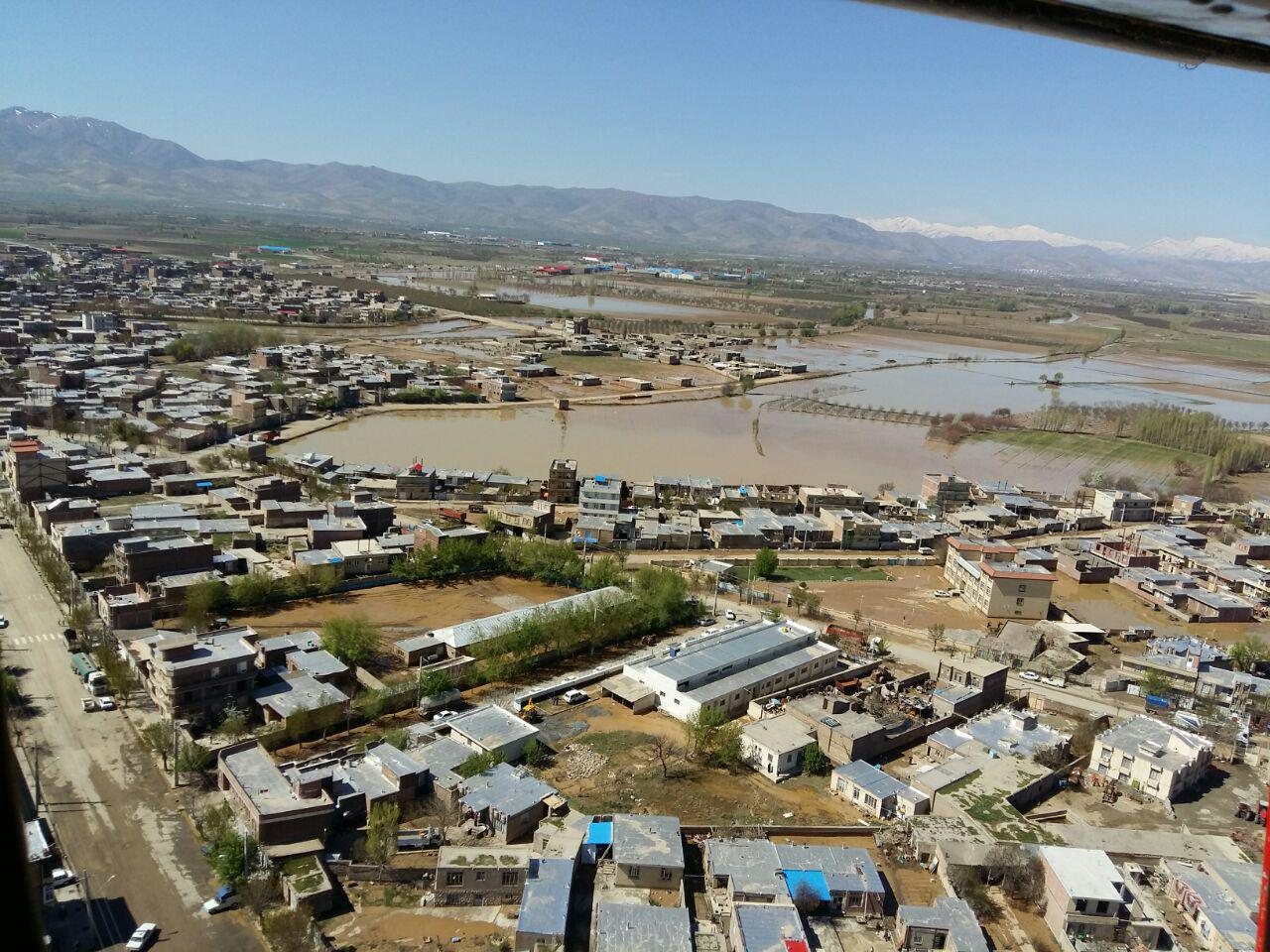
- Aerial view of the city of Mohammadyar

- Location within Iran
- Coordinates: 36°58′55″N 45°31′20″E
- Country: Iran
- Province: West Azerbaijan
- County: Naqadeh
- District: Mohammadyar

Population (2016)
  - Total: 9,313
- Time zone: UTC+3:30 (IRST)

Mohammadyar (Persian: محمديار) (Note: Also romanized as Moḩammad Yār and Moḩammadyār; also known as Muhammadiar. Armenian: Մամադեար or Մէհմէդեառ.) is a city in, and the capital of, Mohammadyar District of Naqadeh County, West Azerbaijan province, Iran. The city has at least one Armenian church.

== Demographics ==
=== Population ===
At the time of the 2006 National Census, the city's population was 8,018 in 1,953 households. The following census in 2011 counted 8,604 people in 2,423 households. The 2016 census measured the population of the city as 9,313 people in 2,775 households.

== Bibliography ==
- Amurian, Andre; Kasheff, Manouchehr (1986). "ARMENIANS OF MODERN IRAN". In Yarshater, Ehsan (ed.). Encyclopædia Iranica (Online ed.). Encyclopædia Iranica Foundation.
