= Barani-ye Ajam =

Village in West Azerbaijan province, Iran

Barani-ye Ajam Persian: باراني عجم
- Village
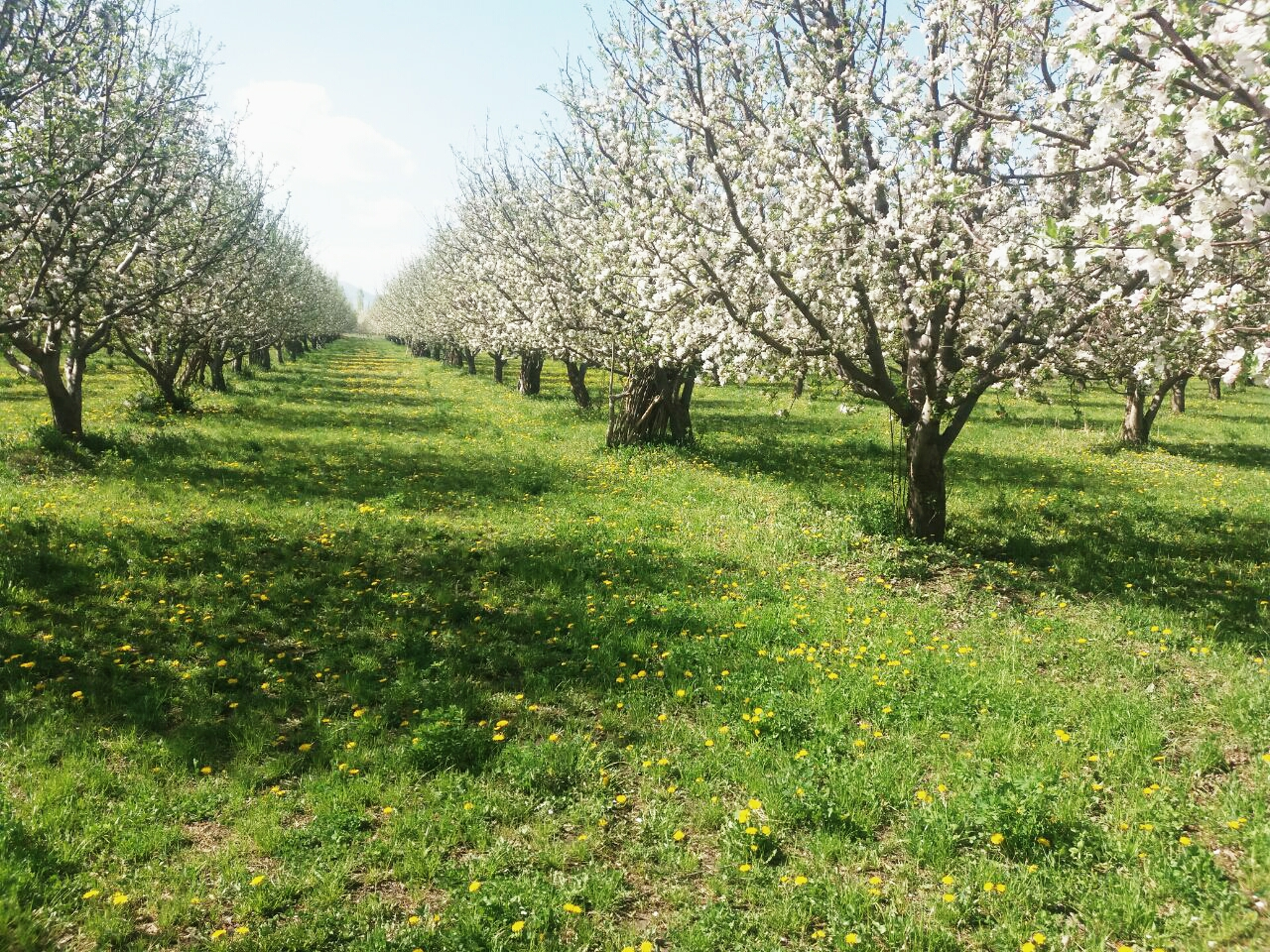
- The village of Barani-ye Ajam

- Location within Iran
- Coordinates: 37°00′43″N 45°29′56″E
- Country: Iran
- Province: West Azerbaijan
- County: Naqadeh
- District: Mohammadyar
- Rural District: Hasanlu

Population (2016)
  - Total: 263
- Time zone: UTC+3:30 (IRST)

Barani-ye Ajam (Persian: باراني عجم) (Note: Also romanized as Bārānī-ye ‘Ajam) is a village in Hasanlu Rural District of Mohammadyar District in Naqadeh County, West Azerbaijan province, Iran.

== Demographics ==
=== Population ===
At the time of the 2006 National Census, the village's population was 331 in 67 households. The following census in 2011 counted 306 people in 83 households. The 2016 census measured the population of the village as 263 people in 83 households.
