= Saral-e Olya =

Village in West Azerbaijan province, Iran

Saral-e Olya Persian: سارال عليا
- Village
- Location within Iran
- Coordinates: 36°59′03″N 45°35′35″E
- Country: Iran
- Province: West Azerbaijan
- County: Naqadeh
- District: Mohammadyar
- Rural District: Almahdi

Population (2016)
  - Total: 221
- Time zone: UTC+3:30 (IRST)

Saral-e Olya (Persian: سارال عليا) (Note: Also romanized as Sārāl-e ‘Olyā; also known as Sārāl-e Bālā) is a village in Almahdi Rural District of Mohammadyar District in Naqadeh County, West Azerbaijan province, Iran.

== Demographics ==
=== Population ===
At the time of the 2006 National Census, the village's population was 186 in 39 households. The following census in 2011 counted 212 people in 59 households. The 2016 census measured the population of the village as 221 people in 50 households.
