= Barani-ye Kord =

Village in West Azerbaijan province, Iran

Barani-ye Kord Persian: باراني كرد
- Village
- Location within Iran
- Coordinates: 37°00′53″N 45°30′22″E
- Country: Iran
- Province: West Azerbaijan
- County: Naqadeh
- District: Mohammadyar
- Rural District: Hasanlu

Population (2016)
  - Total: 247
- Time zone: UTC+3:30 (IRST)

Barani-ye Kord (Persian: باراني كرد) (Note: Also romanized as Bārānī-ye Kord) is a village in Hasanlu Rural District of Mohammadyar District in Naqadeh County, West Azerbaijan province, Iran.

== Demographics ==
=== Population ===
At the time of the 2006 National Census, the village's population was 364 in 61 households. The following census in 2011 counted 286 people in 63 households. The 2016 census measured the population of the village as 247 people in 81 households.
