= Aminullah =

Aminullah, also spelled Aminallah, Aminollah or Ameenullah (Arabic: امين الله) is a male Muslim given name composed from the elements Amin and Allah. It may refer to

- Aminoullah Husseinoff, later known as André Hossein (1905–1983), Iranian/French composer
- Aminullah Amin, Pakistani held in Guantanamo

== See also ==
- Amanullah
- Aminul
