= Saral-e Sofla =

Village in West Azerbaijan province, Iran

Saral-e Sofla Persian: سارال سفلي
- Village
- Location within Iran
- Coordinates: 36°58′52″N 45°36′00″E
- Country: Iran
- Province: West Azerbaijan
- County: Naqadeh
- District: Mohammadyar
- Rural District: Almahdi

Population (2016)
  - Total: 142
- Time zone: UTC+3:30 (IRST)

Saral-e Sofla (Persian: سارال سفلي) (Note: Also romanized as Sārāl-e Soflá; also known as Sārāl-e Pā’īn) is a village in Almahdi Rural District of Mohammadyar District in Naqadeh County, West Azerbaijan province, Iran.

== Demographics ==
=== Population ===
At the time of the 2006 National Census, the village's population was 118 in 20 households. The following census in 2011 counted 137 people in 37 households. The 2016 census measured the population of the village as 142 people in 43 households.
