= Almahdi Rural District (Naqadeh County) =

Rural district in West Azerbaijan province, Iran

Almahdi Rural District Persian: دهستان المهدئ
- Rural District
- Location within Iran
- Coordinates: 37°07′N 45°35′E
- Country: Iran
- Province: West Azerbaijan
- County: Naqadeh
- District: Mohammadyar
- Established: 1996
- Capital: Shahrak-e Mehdi

Population (2016)
  - Total: 7,959
- Time zone: UTC+3:30 (IRST)

Almahdi Rural District (Persian: دهستان المهدئ) is in Mohammadyar District of Naqadeh County, West Azerbaijan province, Iran. Its capital is the village of Shahrak-e Mehdi.

== Demographics ==
=== Population ===
At the time of the 2006 National Census, the rural district's population was 8,542 in 1,763 households. There were 8,278 inhabitants in 2,278 households at the following census of 2011. The 2016 census measured the population of the rural district as 7,959 in 2,119 households. The most populous of its 22 villages was Farrokhzad, with 887 people.

=== Other villages in the rural district ===
- Adeh
- Darageh-ye Lotfollah
- Darageh-ye Oros Khan
- Dash-e Darageh
- Gerdeh Qit
- Gol
- Mameyand
- Nezamabad
- Qalat
- Qarah Qassab
- Saral-e Olya
- Saral-e Sofla
- Tazeh Kand-e Jabal
- Yadegarlu
