= Darageh-ye Oros Khan =

Village in West Azerbaijan province, Iran

Darageh-ye Oros Khan Persian: درگه ارسخان
- Village
- Location within Iran
- Coordinates: 36°58′22″N 45°34′43″E
- Country: Iran
- Province: West Azerbaijan
- County: Naqadeh
- District: Mohammadyar
- Rural District: Almahdi

Population (2016)
  - Total: 276
- Time zone: UTC+3:30 (IRST)

Darageh-ye Oros Khan (Persian: درگه ارسخان) (Note: Also romanized as Darageh-ye Oros Khān; also known as Darakeh-ye Oros Khān and Durageh-ye Aras Khan) is a village in Almahdi Rural District of Mohammadyar District in Naqadeh County, West Azerbaijan province, Iran.

== Demographics ==
=== Population ===
At the time of the 2006 National Census, the village's population was 319 in 83 households. The following census in 2011 counted 310 people in 91 households. The 2016 census measured the population of the village as 276 people in 69 households.
