= Dargah, Hormozgan =

Dargah درگاه
- Village
- Location within Iran
- Coordinates: 26°48′43″N 58°02′20″E
- Country: Iran
- Province: Hormozgan
- County: Bashagard
- Bakhsh: Gowharan
- Rural District: Gowharan

Population (2006)
  - Total: 332
- Time zone: UTC+3:30 (IRST)
  - Summer (DST): UTC+4:30 (IRDT)

Dargah (Persian: درگاه, also Romanized as Dargāh; also known as Darkāh) is a village in Gowharan Rural District, Gowharan District, Bashagard County, Hormozgan Province, Iran. At the 2006 census, its population was 332, in 64 families.
