= Dargah-e Soleyman =

Dargah-e Soleyman درگاه سليمان
- Village
- Location within Iran
- Coordinates: 36°10′34″N 46°24′16″E
- Country: Iran
- Province: Kurdistan
- County: Saqqez
- Bakhsh: Ziviyeh
- Rural District: Saheb

Population (2006)
  - Total: 337
- Time zone: UTC+3:30 (IRST)
  - Summer (DST): UTC+4:30 (IRDT)

Dargah-e Soleyman (Persian: درگاه سليمان, also Romanized as Dargāh-e Soleymān and Dargāh Soleymān) is a village in Saheb Rural District, Ziviyeh District, Saqqez County, Kurdistan Province, Iran. At the 2006 census, its population was 337, in 72 families. The village is populated by Kurds.
