= Sheykh Ahmad, Khuzestan =

Sheykh Ahmad شيخ احمد
- Village
- Location within Iran
- Coordinates: 32°05′59″N 49°34′22″E
- Country: Iran
- Province: Khuzestan
- County: Andika
- Bakhsh: Abezhdan
- Rural District: Kushk

Population (2006)
  - Total: 46
- Time zone: UTC+3:30 (IRST)
  - Summer (DST): UTC+4:30 (IRDT)

Sheykh Ahmad (Persian: شيخ احمد, also Romanized as Sheykh Aḩmad; also known as Sheykhaḩmad) is a village in Kushk Rural District, Abezhdan District, Andika County, Khuzestan Province, Iran. At the 2006 census, its population was 46, in 9 families.
