= Şirinbulaq =

- Municipality
- Location within Azerbaijan Location within Shaki-Zagatala Economic Region
- Coordinates: 40°57′57″N 47°13′45″E
- Country: Azerbaijan
- Rayon: Shaki

Population
  - Total: 748
- Time zone: UTC+4 (AZT)
  - Summer (DST): UTC+5 (AZT)

Şirinbulaq (also, Alikhanly-Shirin-Bulag) is a village and municipality in the Shaki Rayon of Azerbaijan. It has a population of 748.
