= Barani, Sistan and Baluchestan =

Barani باراني
- Village
- Location within Iran
- Coordinates: 31°06′18″N 61°40′36″E
- Country: Iran
- Province: Sistan and Baluchestan
- County: Hirmand
- Bakhsh: Central
- Rural District: Margan

Population (2006)
  - Total: 346
- Time zone: UTC+3:30 (IRST)
  - Summer (DST): UTC+4:30 (IRDT)

Barani (Persian: باراني, also Romanized as Bārānī) is a village in Margan Rural District, in the Central District of Hirmand County, Sistan and Baluchestan Province, Iran. At the 2006 census, its population was 346, in 64 families.
