= Dargah-e Sheykhan, Baneh =

Dargah-e Sheykhan درگاه شيخان
- Village
- Location within Iran
- Coordinates: 35°55′22″N 45°55′16″E
- Country: Iran
- Province: Kurdistan
- County: Baneh
- Bakhsh: Nanur
- Rural District: Buin

Population (2006)
  - Total: 111
- Time zone: UTC+3:30 (IRST)
  - Summer (DST): UTC+4:30 (IRDT)

Dargah-e Sheykhan (Persian: درگاه شيخان, also Romanized as Dargāh-e Sheykhān and Dargāh-e Shaykhān) is a village in Buin Rural District, Nanur District, Baneh County, Kurdistan Province, Iran. At the 2006 census, its population was 111, in 22 families. The village is populated by Kurds.
