= Sheykh Ahmad, East Azerbaijan =

Sheykh Ahmad شيخ احمد
- Village
- Location within Iran
- Coordinates: 38°42′34″N 46°49′28″E
- Country: Iran
- Province: East Azerbaijan
- County: Ahar
- Bakhsh: Central
- Rural District: Azghan

Population (2006)
  - Total: 52
- Time zone: UTC+3:30 (IRST)
  - Summer (DST): UTC+4:30 (IRDT)

Sheykh Ahmad (Persian: شيخ احمد, also Romanized as Sheykh Aḩmad and Shaikh Ahmad; also known as Sheykh Aḩmadlū and Shikhakhmety) is a village in Azghan Rural District, in the Central District of Ahar County, East Azerbaijan Province, Iran. At the 2006 census, its population was 52, in 10 families.
