= Hasanlu, Urmia =

Hasanlu حسنلو
- Village
- Location within Iran
- Coordinates: 37°51′18″N 44°27′03″E
- Country: Iran
- Province: West Azerbaijan
- County: Urmia
- Bakhsh: Sumay-ye Beradust
- Rural District: Sumay-ye Jonubi

Population (2006)
  - Total: 574
- Time zone: UTC+3:30 (IRST)
  - Summer (DST): UTC+4:30 (IRDT)

Hasanlu (Persian: حسنلو, also Romanized as Ḩasanlū) is a village in Sumay-ye Jonubi Rural District, Sumay-ye Beradust District, Urmia County, West Azerbaijan Province, Iran. At the 2006 census, its population was 574, in 106 families.
