= Darageh-ye Molla Ali Karam =

Darageh-ye Molla Ali Karam درگه ملاعلي كرم
- Village
- Location within Iran
- Coordinates: 34°19′35″N 46°54′14″E
- Country: Iran
- Province: Kermanshah
- County: Kermanshah
- Bakhsh: Mahidasht
- Rural District: Mahidasht

Population (2006)
  - Total: 111
- Time zone: UTC+3:30 (IRST)
  - Summer (DST): UTC+4:30 (IRDT)

Darageh-ye Molla Ali Karam (Persian: درگه ملاعلي كرم, also Romanized as Darageh-ye Mollā ʿAlī Karam; also known as Darakeh-ye Mollaalīkaram) is a village in Mahidasht Rural District, Mahidasht District, Kermanshah County, Kermanshah Province, Iran. At the 2006 census, its population was 111, in 26 families.
