= Darageh-ye Lotfollah =

Village in West Azerbaijan province, Iran

Darageh-ye Lotfollah Persian: درگه لطف الله
- Village
- Location within Iran
- Coordinates: 36°58′34″N 45°37′38″E
- Country: Iran
- Province: West Azerbaijan
- County: Naqadeh
- District: Mohammadyar
- Rural District: Almahdi

Population (2016)
  - Total: 479
- Time zone: UTC+3:30 (IRST)

Darageh-ye Lotfollah (Persian: درگه لطف الله) (Note: Also romanized as Darageh-ye Loţfollāh; also known as Darakeh-ye Loţfollāh) is a village in Almahdi Rural District of Mohammadyar District in Naqadeh County, West Azerbaijan province, Iran.

== Demographics ==
=== Population ===
At the time of the 2006 National Census, the village's population was 461 in 76 households. The following census in 2011 counted 468 people in 133 households. The 2016 census measured the population of the village as 479 people in 116 households.
