= Dargah-e Sheykhan, Marivan =

Dargah-e Sheykhan درگاه شيخان
- Village
- Location within Iran
- Coordinates: 35°24′38″N 46°11′39″E
- Country: Iran
- Province: Kurdistan
- County: Marivan
- Bakhsh: Central
- Rural District: Sarkal

Population (2006)
  - Total: 498
- Time zone: UTC+3:30 (IRST)
  - Summer (DST): UTC+4:30 (IRDT)

Dargah-e Sheykhan (Persian: درگاه شيخان, also Romanized as Dargāh-e Sheykhān and Dargāh-i-Shaikhān; also known as Degā Sheykhān and Deh Shaikhan) is a village in Sarkal Rural District, in the Central District of Marivan County, Kurdistan Province, Iran. At the 2006 census, its population was 498, in 108 families. The village is populated by Kurds.
