= Sheykh Ahmadlu =

Sheykh Ahmadlu شيخ احمدلو
- Village
- Location within Iran
- Coordinates: 37°34′36″N 47°18′40″E
- Country: Iran
- Province: East Azerbaijan
- County: Meyaneh
- Bakhsh: Torkamanchay
- Rural District: Barvanan-e Gharbi

Population (2006)
  - Total: 114
- Time zone: UTC+3:30 (IRST)
  - Summer (DST): UTC+4:30 (IRDT)

Sheykh Ahmadlu (Persian: شيخ احمدلو, also Romanized as Sheykh Aḩmadlū; also known as Sheykh Aḩmad) is a village in Barvanan-e Gharbi Rural District, Torkamanchay District, Meyaneh County, East Azerbaijan Province, Iran. At the 2006 census, its population was 114, in 27 families.
