= Dergah, West Azerbaijan =

Dergah درگه
- Village
- Location within Iran
- Coordinates: 38°06′35″N 44°26′48″E
- Country: Iran
- Province: West Azerbaijan
- County: Salmas
- Bakhsh: Kuhsar
- Rural District: Shenetal

Population (2006)
  - Total: 210
- Time zone: UTC+3:30 (IRST)
  - Summer (DST): UTC+4:30 (IRDT)

Dergah (Persian: درگه) is a village in Shenetal Rural District, Kuhsar District, Salmas County, West Azerbaijan Province, Iran. At the 2006 census, its population was 210, in 36 families.
