= Dargeh, Dalahu =

Dargeh درگه
- Village
- Location within Iran
- Coordinates: 34°24′52″N 46°18′20″E
- Country: Iran
- Province: Kermanshah
- County: Dalahu
- Bakhsh: Gahvareh
- Rural District: Gurani

Population (2006)
  - Total: 195
- Time zone: UTC+3:30 (IRST)
  - Summer (DST): UTC+4:30 (IRDT)

Dargeh (Persian: درگه; also known as Darkeh) is a village in Gurani Rural District, Gahvareh District, Dalahu County, Kermanshah Province, Iran. At the 2006 census, its population was 195, in 43 families.
