= Dergah, Ravansar =

Dergah درگه
- Village
- Location within Iran
- Coordinates: 34°40′33″N 46°30′36″E
- Country: Iran
- Province: Kermanshah
- County: Ravansar
- Bakhsh: Central
- Rural District: Dowlatabad

Population (2006)
  - Total: 67
- Time zone: UTC+3:30 (IRST)
  - Summer (DST): UTC+4:30 (IRDT)

Dergah (Persian: درگه; also known as Darkeh and Derkah) is a village in Dowlatabad Rural District, in the Central District of Ravansar County, Kermanshah Province, Iran. At the 2006 census, its population was 67, in 13 families.
