= Md. Aminul Islam (judge) =

Bangladeshi judge

Justice of the High Court Division of Bangladesh

Personal details
- Born: 2 December 1963 (age 62)
- Profession: Judge

Md. Aminul Islam is a Justice of the High Court Division of the Bangladesh Supreme Court. He is a former Deputy Attorney General of Bangladesh.

== Early life ==
Aminul Islam was born on 2 December 1963. He got his bachelor's in law and another bachelor's in social sciences from the University of Dhaka. He also has a Master of Social Science from the University of Dhaka.

== Career ==
Aminul Islam became a member of the Bangladesh Bar Council on 15 September 1992, and the Dhaka Bar Association on 22 October 1992. Aminul Islam became a lawyer in the High Court Division on 20 April 2005.

In 2017, Aminul Islam was appointed the Deputy Attorney General of Bangladesh.

In 2020, Aminul Islam was the prosecutor of the 2012 Laxmipur schoolgirl rape and murder case in which the High Court Division confirmed the death sentences of eight accused and commuted two to life sentences.

In February 2021, Aminul Islam represented the state at the trial of journalist Akib Hridoy, who had been sued under the Digital Security Act by the Kishoreganj District Deputy Commissioner Md Sarwar Murshed Chowdhury. Aminul Islam did not oppose the journalist's bail.

In April, Aminul Islam was the prosecutor in the Major Sinha Md Rashed Khan murder case. Aminul Islam worked as the Deputy Attorney General until 2022.

He was appointed an additional judge of the High Court Division on 31 July 2022. He and the ten newly appointed judges visited the mausoleum of Sheikh Mujibur Rahman after their appointment.

In April 2023, Aminul Islam and Justice Mustafa Zaman Islam granted anticipatory bail to Matiur Rahman, editor of Prothom Alo, in the Digital Security Act case. In June, Aminul Islam and Justice Mustafa Zaman Islam expressed surprise at the custodial torture of a businessman by officer-charge of Padma South Bridge police station Mustafizur Rahman and Additional Superintendent of Police Md Rasel Monir to extort 7.2 million BDT, despite the businessman securing bail from the High Court Division. The court also expressed dissatisfaction with the officer being withdrawn, as it was not an adequate punishment. In August 2023, Aminul Islam and Justice Mustafa Zaman Islam asked the Anti-Corruption Commission why it had not filed an appeal against a High Court Division verdict on 11 March 2010, which scrapped the Niko corruption case against Prime Minister Sheikh Hasina. Defense lawyers argued that the Niko corruption case should not continue against former Prime Minister Khaleda Zia since it had been scrapped against Sheikh Hasina. Aminul Islam and Justice Mustafa Zaman Islam granted anticipatory bail to Bangladesh Nationalist Party politician Nipun Roy Chowdhury following clashes between police and Bangladesh Nationalist Party activists in Dholaikhal on 29 July.
