= Amanullah Khan Niazi =

Pakistani police officer

- امان اللہ خان نیازی
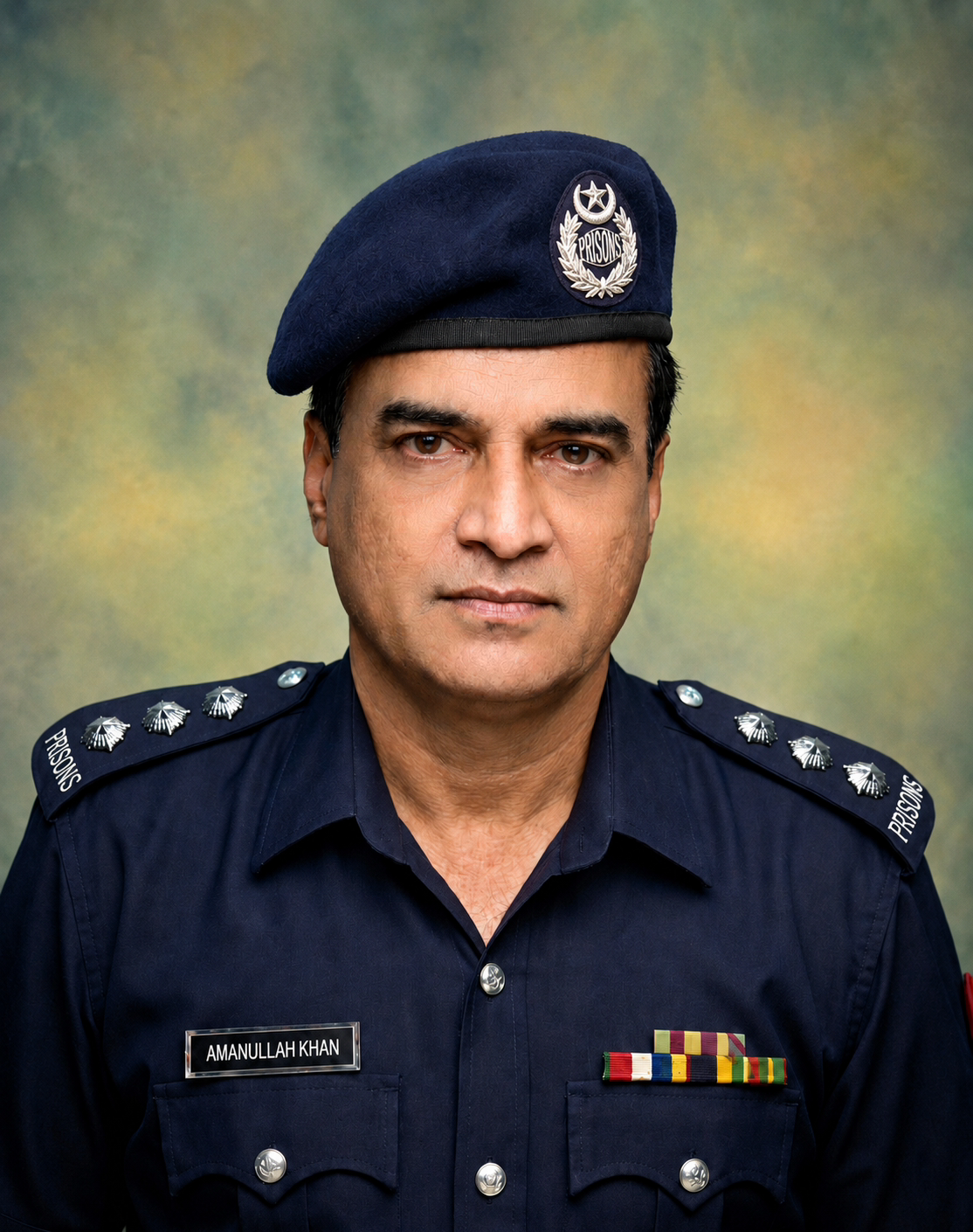
- Born: 14 March 1959; Karachi, Pakistan
- Died: 15 June 2006 (aged 47); Saddar Town
- Occupation: Superintendent
- Years active: 1983-2006
- Children: 3

Amanullah Khan Niazi (14 March 1959 – 15 June 2006) was a senior jail officer (Superintendent) of Central Prison Karachi, in Karachi, Pakistan. He served in the prison department for more than 20 years.

On 15 June 2006, Niazi was ambushed along with six of his associates in Saddar, allegedly by Ubaid Khursheed alias K2. He was killed as martyrs, over his refusal to facilitate inmates belonging to a political party (by not allowing women visiting them in jail to stay beyond visiting hours), including death row inmate Saulat Mirza, Nadir Shah and MQM leader Saeed Bharam. Saeed was angry about Niazi not cooperating. As soon as he was released from jail, he started plotting against him. It was alleged that he ordered the killing of Niazi over his refusal to provide illegal facilities to Saulat Mirza during his incarceration at Central Prison Karachi.

In 2015 Ubaid was arrested during a Rangers’ raid at Muttahida Qaumi Movement's (MQM'S) headquarters Nine Zero. During the interrogation, Ubaid claimed that he was given the task by Saeed Bharam along with at least a dozen other men. The plan was set in motion on June 15, 2006 Ubaid was being instructed by Saeed over the phone. Amanullah Niazi, his brother Inspector Habibullah Niazi, head constable Akhtar Hussain, police constable Sabir Sultan, and Shafiullah were killed, while several others were injured in the attack near Electronics Market.
