= Dargeh-ye Khalifeh Qoli =

Village in Kermanshah, Iran

Dargeh-ye Khalifeh Qoli درگه خليفه قلي
- Village
- Location within Iran
- Coordinates: 34°18′33″N 46°55′39″E
- Country: Iran
- Province: Kermanshah
- County: Kermanshah
- Bakhsh: Mahidasht
- Rural District: Mahidasht

Population (2006)
  - Total: 46
- Time zone: UTC+3:30 (IRST)
  - Summer (DST): UTC+4:30 (IRDT)

Dargeh-ye Khalifeh Qoli (Persian: درگه خليفه قلي, also Romanized as Dargeh-ye Khalīfeh Qolī; also known as Darkeh-ye Khalīfeh Qolī) is a village in Mahidasht Rural District, Mahidasht District, Kermanshah County, Kermanshah Province, Iran. At the 2006 census, its population was 46, in 14 families.
