= Dargeh-ye Cheshmeh Said =

Dargeh-ye Cheshmeh Said درگه چشمه سعيد
- Village
- Country: Iran
- Province: Kermanshah
- County: Kermanshah
- Bakhsh: Mahidasht
- Rural District: Mahidasht

Population (2006)
  - Total: 55
- Time zone: UTC+3:30 (IRST)
  - Summer (DST): UTC+4:30 (IRDT)

Dargeh-ye Cheshmeh Said (Persian: درگه چشمه سعيد, also Romanized as Dargeh-ye Cheshmeh Saʿīd) is a village in Mahidasht Rural District, Mahidasht District, Kermanshah County, Kermanshah Province, Iran. At the 2006 census, its population was 55, in 15 families.
