= Aminul Huq Moni =

- আমিনুল হক মনি
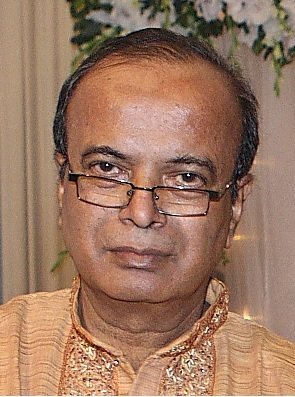
- Aminul Huq Moni
- Born: March 1, 1949; Shiliguri, Darjeeling, India
- Died: June 1, 2015 (aged 66); Dhaka, Bangladesh
- Other name: Moni
- Employer(s): Bangladesh Cricket Board, Bangla Vision, Mohammedan Sporting Club
- Known for: Cricket Administrator and Sports Organiser

Aminul Huq Moni (Bengali: আমিনুল হক মনি; March 1, 1949 – June 1, 2015) was a sports organiser and media executive of Bangladesh. He had made significant contributions to the development of cricket in Bangladesh and was the managing director of Bangla Vision.

== Early life ==
Moni was born to Muzaffar Ali (a divisional forest officer) and Jamila Khatun (a housewife). After attaining his BSc (Hons) and MSc in physics from the University of Dhaka with first class, Moni joined as a lecturer of theoretical physics at the same institution.

== Career ==
=== Sports ===
Moni did not continue his teaching profession for long and soon became deeply involved in sports at multiple levels in the mid-1970s. Moni had played cricket for local teams. He started contributing to the management and organisation of various sports like cricket, football, badminton, hockey, judo, table tennis and others. Being a supporter of the Mohammedan Sporting Club, he became a part of the club's management committee where he held different positions including the role of the vice-president.

Moni and his fellow sports organisers in the 1970s and 1980s modernised the sports industry of Bangladesh. He along with others translated international rules, regulations and bylaws for the local context. This helped to build the foundations of Bangladesh cricket.

Moni became a member of Bangladesh Cricket Board where he initially served as a joint secretary. He, with the help of a few other members of the board, started the annual Nirman School Cricket tournament. It was a success and has produced many star cricketers. Moni had served as the General Secretary of the Bangladesh Cricket Board during 1991–1997.

As described by Bangladesh Cricket Board Director Ahmed Sajjadul Alam Bobby in his memorial article in The Daily Star, "There were a number of things that he did for Bangladesh's cricket but to me his landmark achievement was when he managed to install two Astroturfs for the Dhaka Cricket League. One was at the Abahani ground, while the other was at the Bangabandhu National Stadium."

"The sole intention behind that was that the 1997 ICC Trophy was going to be played on AstroTurf in Malaysia. So our players got two full seasons on those turfs and the result was phenomenal. We won the 1997 ICC Trophy from where our cricket never looked back. It's a legendary story now."

Also echoed in the ESPN Cricinfo website, "He was the board's general secretary from 1991 to 1996 and is one of the chief planners of Bangladesh's 1997 ICC Trophy campaign which they eventually won and by virtue qualified for their first World Cup appearance in 1999."

Moni was appointed as the convener of Bangladesh Cricket Board's Domestic Cricket Structure Review Body in 2007. He was later appointed as a Director of BCB during 2009–2012 and chaired the Local Game Development committee.

== Death ==
Moni was diagnosed with cancer and other health issues towards the end of his life. He remained in the ICU of United Hospital in Dhaka in the last few weeks leading to his death on June 1, 2015 (as reported by his brother-in-law Zahiruddin Ahmed).

A large number of sports and media personalities attended his funeral in Mohammedan Sporting Club. Memorial events were organised by Bangla Vision and other organisations where Minister of Information Hasanul Haq Inu, Minister of Planning Mustafa Kamal, along with other important personalities presented their eulogies.

The news of Aminul Huq Moni's death was widely covered in Bangladeshi media.
