= Dargeh-ye Gholam Ali =

Dargeh-ye Gholam Ali درگه غلامعلي
- Village
- Location within Iran
- Coordinates: 34°19′10″N 46°58′05″E
- Country: Iran
- Province: Kermanshah
- County: Kermanshah
- Bakhsh: Mahidasht
- Rural District: Mahidasht

Population (2006)
  - Total: 115
- Time zone: UTC+3:30 (IRST)
  - Summer (DST): UTC+4:30 (IRDT)

Dargeh-ye Gholam Ali (Persian: درگه غلامعلي, also Romanized as Dargeh-ye Gholām 'Alī; also known as Darkeh-ye Gholām 'Alī) is a village in Mahidasht Rural District, Mahidasht District, Kermanshah County, Kermanshah province, Iran. At the 2006 census, its population was 115, in 27 families.
