= Ahmad Mowla =

Ahmad Mowla احمدمولا
- Village
- Location within Iran
- Coordinates: 32°05′04″N 48°15′27″E
- Country: Iran
- Province: Khuzestan
- County: Shush
- Bakhsh: Central
- Rural District: Hoseynabad

Population (2006)
  - Total: 1,641
- Time zone: UTC+3:30 (IRST)
  - Summer (DST): UTC+4:30 (IRDT)

Ahmad Mowla (Persian: احمدمولا, also Romanized as Aḩmad Mowlā; also known as Sheykh Aḩmad) is a village in Hoseynabad Rural District, in the Central District of Shush County, Khuzestan Province, Iran. At the 2006 census, its population was 1,641, in 194 families.
