= Saral, Raigarh =

Village in Maharashtra

Saral सारळ
- village
- Nickname: सारळ
- Location in Maharashtra, India Saral (India)
- Coordinates: 18.7868°N 72.9136°E
- Country: India
- State: Maharashtra
- District: Raigad (or Raigarh)
- Taluka: Alibag
- Elevation: 3 m (9.8 ft)

Population (2011)
  - Total: 1,551

Languages
  - Official: Marathi
- Time zone: UTC+5:30 (IST)
- Nearest city: Alibag

Saaral (सारळ) is a small village in Maharashtra, India. It is situated in the Alibag taluka of Raigad district.

== Transport ==
The village is located on Alibag-Rewas road. An alternate route to reach here is Alibag-Rewas Via Hashiware. Both the routes meet at Saral Pul (Bridge). The village is at walking distance from the bridge. The village is also accessible from Mumbai by Boat via Mandwa or Rewas Port.

== Demographics ==
According to the 2011 census of India, Saral had a population of 1,551.

Saral has mixed population of different cast's residents dominantly Mali, Agree, Koli.

== Landmarks ==
The village has a well known temple of "Bapuji Dev". There is also a historic temple of Shiva. The architecture of the Shiva temple is based on Hindu architecture.
