= Aminul Islam (trade unionist) =

Bangladeshi trade unionist

Aminul Islam (1973 – 4 April 2012) was a Bangladeshi trade unionist who was murdered in 2012 and gained international attention.

== Biographical details ==
Islam was married and had two sons and one daughter.

== Work ==
Islam, a former garment worker, was president of the Ashulia and Savar chapters of the Bangladesh Garment and Industrial Workers Federation and a leader of the Bangladesh Center for Workers' Solidarity, which has advocated for improved working conditions and higher wages. In 2010, the organization led protests to push for a larger increase in the minimum wage for garment workers in the Bangladesh textile industry. Islam, as well as other labor leaders, had been arrested in connection with these protests. During his arrest in 2010, he was physically tortured by officers of the National Security Intelligence.

Islam had recently been working to organize workers in factories belonging to the Shanta Group, which produces clothing for multiple American companies, including Tommy Hilfiger, Nike, and Ralph Lauren. He had also assisted ABC News in setting up interviews with survivors of a recent factory fire in Bangladesh.

== Murder ==
The 6 April 2012 issue of the Bangali-language newspaper Amar Desh carried a photograph of a man whose identity was unknown at the time and whose dead body had been found by the Tangail police. From the photo in Amar Desh, Islam's family was able to recognize him.

Islam's body was found on 5 April 2012 next to a road near Ghatail, Bangladesh, sixty-one miles north of Dhaka. His body bore marks of torture. He had last been seen alive in Ashulia, a center of the garment industry near Dhaka. It is suspected that he was murdered because he was involved in seeking justice for the general worker of the garment sector of Bangladesh.

Islam's murder is still unsolved, but his case gained international attention from the AFL–CIO and the US State Department.
