= Dargah, Gilan-e Gharb =

Dargah درگه
- village
- Location within Iran
- Coordinates: 34°07′36″N 46°16′02″E
- Country: Iran
- Province: Kermanshah
- County: Gilan-e Gharb
- Bakhsh: Govar
- Rural District: Gowavar

Population (2006)
  - Total: 253
- Time zone: UTC+3:30 (IRST)
  - Summer (DST): UTC+4:30 (IRDT)

Dargah (Persian: درگه; also known as Darakeh, Darreh Gah, and Darrehkeh) is a village in Gowavar Rural District, Govar District, Gilan-e Gharb County, Kermanshah Province, Iran. At the 2006 census, its population was 253, distributed among 59 families.
