= Aminul Islam (artist) =

- Born: 7 November 1931; Tetia village, Bengal Presidency, British India
- Died: 8 July 2011 (aged 79)
- Education: University of Dhaka
- Awards: full list

Aminul Islam (7 November 1931 – 8 July 2011) was a Bangladeshi artist. He was a part of Bangladesh modern art movement in 1950s. He was awarded Ekushey Padak in 1981 and Independence Day Award in 1988 by the Government of Bangladesh.

== Education and career ==
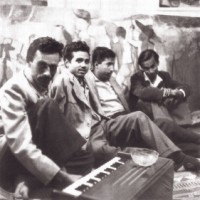
(from left) Mohammad Kibria, Islam, Rashid Choudhury and Qayyum Chowdhury (1959)

Islam studied in Mahuttuli Primary School in Dhaka. During his study at Armanitola High School, he started copying Japanese and Chinese art. He passed his matriculation in 1947. Then he went to Calcutta Art College for admission but he decided to get admitted as the first batch student to a newly established Dhaka Art School (now Faculty of Fine Arts, University of Dhaka), founded by Zainul Abedin in 1948. He graduated in 1953 and then, with an Italian government scholarship, he completed advanced studies in Accademia di Belle Arti di Firenze in Florence during 1953–1956. Several solo exhibitions of his works were held in Rome and Florence. After moving back to Dhaka in 1956, his first solo exhibition was held at the Press Club.

Islam then joined as a faculty member in the Institute of Fine Arts in Dhaka. He became the principal of the institute in 1978. He retired in 1983.

== Works ==
Ten murals designed by Islam are set in Dhaka including the following:

- The interior of old Bangladesh Bank building (1968)
- The mosaic mural on the front wall of Osmani Hall (1984),
- the 20 X 20 feet mural at the entrance of the Janata Bank Head Office in Motijheel (1986)
- 84 X 15.1 feet mural at the terrace of the 32 storied Bangladesh Bank building (1996)
- The mosaic mural on the wall of Holy Cross College

== Awards ==
- Ekushey Padak (1981)
- Independence Day Award (1988)
