= Aminul Islam (poet) =

Bangladeshi poet and essayist

Poet Aminul Islam
- আমিনুল ইসলাম
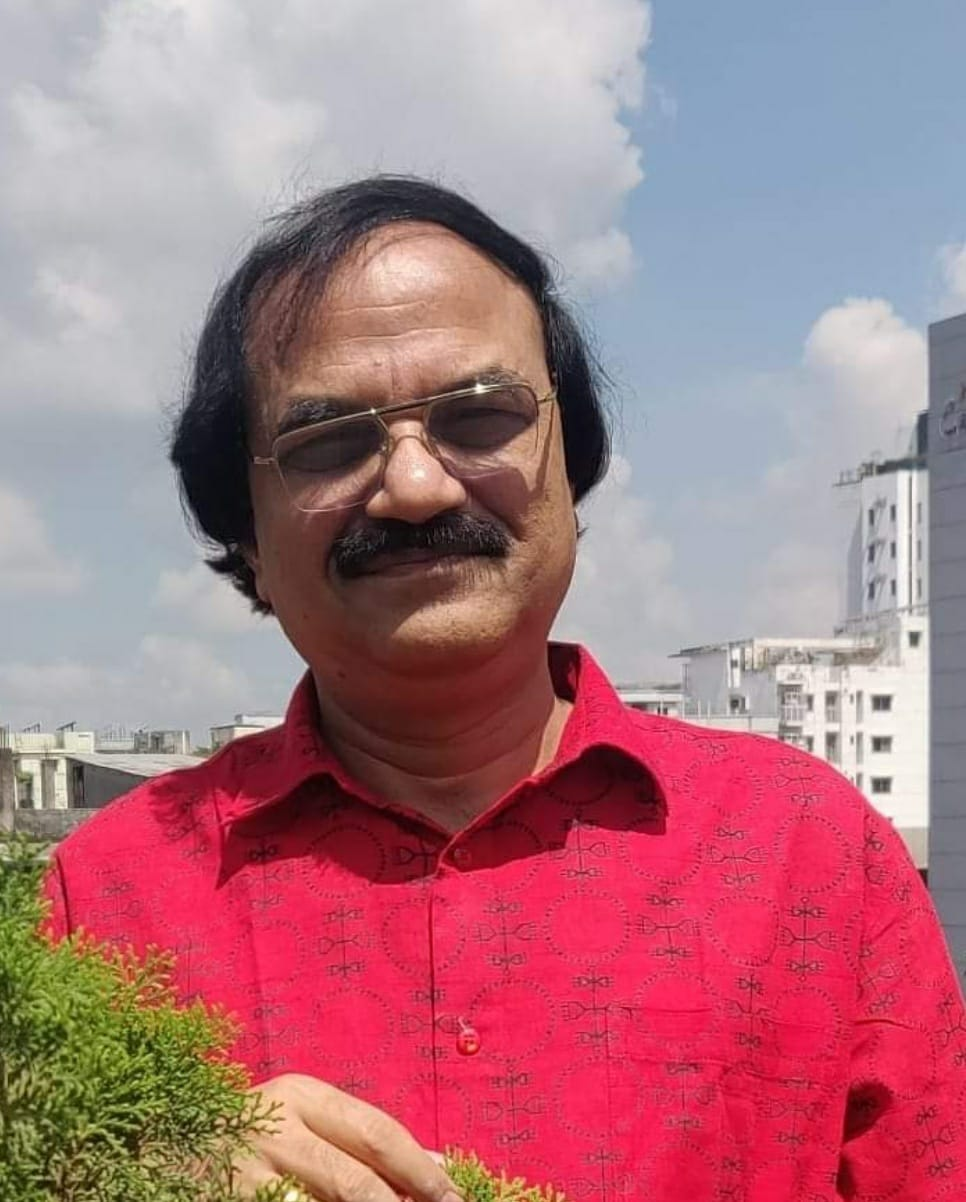
- Poet Aminul Islam
- Born: December 29, 1963 (age 62)
- Occupation: Poet
- Spouse: Rokshana Parvin
- Children: 2

Aminul Islam (born 29 December 1963) is a poet and essayist from Bangladesh. He has written 28 books including 23 books of poetry. He has been involved in creative writing for some 25 years.

== Early life and education ==
Aminul Islam was born on December 29, 1963, in the Chapai Nawabganj District, Bangladesh. He obtained his Higher Secondary School Certificate (HSC) from Rajshahi College. He took his bachelor's degree in social work from the University of Rajshahi and his Master of Arts from the same intuition. He obtained a Master of Social Science Degree from the Northern University of Bangladesh. He joined the Bangladesh Civil Service in 1988. He traveled and toured India, Italy, Indonesia, Malaysia, Philippines, Myanmar, Turkey, Australia, Spain, Portugal, Saudi Arabia, and the United Arab Emirates.

== Literary life ==
Aminul Islam, a Bangladeshi poet, has exhibited a deep appreciation for literature, particularly poetry, since his childhood. His love for music and songs is equally noteworthy. Islam commenced his journey as a poet during his university years, and although there was a hiatus in his poetry writing, he returned with his first book, "Tantra Theke Doore," published in 2002. Subsequent works include "Mahananda Ek Sonali Nodir Naam" (The Name of a River) in 2004, "Shes Hemonter Jochona" in 2008, and "Kuashar Barnamala" in 2009, all of which received acclaim from readers and critics alike. In 2010, he was honored with the Bogra Lekhok Chakra Swikriti Award.

Aminul Islam's literary repertoire extends beyond poetry, encompassing child rhymes, literary prose, and research-oriented articles. His prolific output has garnered consistent admiration and critical acclaim. By 2024, he had authored 23 books of poetry, 3 books of child rhymes, 1 essay collections and 1 research book. Notably, he received the IFIC Bank Literary Award in 2021 for his research work on the songs of Kazi Nazrul Islam.

Renowned Bengali novelist and critic Hasnat Abdul Hye characterized Aminul Islam as an original poet (মৌলিক কবি) who has crafted a distinct language for urban and realistic poetry in the digital age. Poet and critic Khyam Quader highlighted Islam's unique linguistic style, using diverse sources to create rich and unique elements in his works. Anjan Kumar Sarkar, a critic and Principal of Bangladesh Co-operative Academy, praised Islam's ability to personify subjects and objects, making romantic poems accessible through dialogues and soliloquies. Shujayet Ullah, Director (Rtd), National Archives of Bangladesh, commended Islam's archaeological overtone and the fusion of history, tradition and social legacy in his poetry.

The assessment of Aminul Islam's poetic style continues with Mashiur Rahman, a former student of English Literature, poet, and researcher, emphasizing the profound intensity and distinctive word choice that sets Islam apart in contemporary Bangla poetry. Rahman also commended Islam's skillful use of seemingly un-poetic words, turning them into poetic gems through deliberate placement and context building. Renowned Bengali poet and Professor of English Literature Sayeed Abubakar has called Aminul Islam a brilliant modern poet of time. Overall, Aminul Islam emerges as one of the most discussed and influential poets in Bangladesh, earning acclaim for his unique style and literary contributions.

== Publication on Aminul Islam's Poetry ==
Aminul Islam is one of the most prolific and discussed poets of his time in Bangladesh. Dozens of senior poets, critics and literary scholars have written articles on his poetry and described him as one of the powerful poet with distinctive style.

Bengali novelist and critic Hasnat Abdul Hye in one of his Bengali article described "....Such a poet can be described as 'born poet', 'devoted soul', 'recluse'. But reading his poems, it is understood that he is an original poet. He has created his own language for writing poetry which is both urban and realistic. The experience of everyday life is not only the subject of many of his poems, but he has also used many new words effortlessly and artistically. I don't hesitate to call him 'modern' for this feature. It is no exaggeration to say that he is the first poet of the digital age {এমন একজন কাব্যপ্রেমিককে ‘জাতকবি’, ‘নিবেদিতপ্রাণ’, ‘নিভৃতচারী’, এসব অভিধায় বর্ণনা করা যায়। কিন্তু তাঁর কবিতা পাঠ করলে বোঝা যায় তিনি একজন মৌলিক কবি। তিনি কবিতা লেখার জন্য নিজস্ব ভাষা নির্মাণ করেছেন যা একইসঙ্গে নাগরিক এবং বাস্তবতামন্ডিত। দৈনন্দিন জীবনের অভিজ্ঞতা শুধু তাঁর অনেক কবিতার বিষয় হয়নি, সেখানে ব্যবহৃত অনেক নতুন শব্দ তিনি অনায়াসে এবং শিল্পিত ভঙ্গিতে ব্যবহার করেছেন। এ বৈশিষ্ট্যের জন্য তাঁকে ‘আধুনিক’ বলতে দ্বিধা হয় না। তিনিই ডিজিটাল যুগের প্রথম কবিতা রচয়িতা, একথা বলা হলে অত্যুক্তি হবে না।}."

Poet and critic Khyam Quader said "Poet Aminul Islam, in persuasion of the above-said points and tenets of poetry, I think, has fashioned a potential orb of poetic diction of his own. In this connection, Shafiuddin Ahmed, in his essay `Aminul Islam: The poet of Root Opulence', says- Making a cloister in his own world of speech and language sequence, he rises up to a brilliant splendor of his self-radiance. (Dristy, Aminul Islam Issue by Biren Mukherjee; February, 2020, page-21). His manner of word-collection, pattern of word-stuffing, style of lingual presentation and seemliness, lexicographic dignity and sublimity, thought-releasing simplicity and the form of thematic reflections-- all are substantially and ornately special and different from his contemporaries. He picks and acquires his language from almost all the spheres of human situations, and bestows and endows them with multifarious essences of prevailing realism.

For this wide variety and diversity of sources of his philological fervours his similies, metaphors, conceits, alliterations, allusions, pictography, imagery and all other rhetorical and prosodic ingredients are found significantly rich and unique."

Evaluating and Appreciating poetic style of Aminul Islam critic and Principal of Bangladesh Co-operative Academy Anjan Kumar Sarkar in one of his articles said "He has personified all his subjects or objects. It is his speciality to make the object the subject. He has shown a great artistic capacity to make the romantic poems very simple easily enjoyable through dialogues and soliloquies and ventriloquism. His words come like the tide of the river very silently but completely, like the frost that covers the face of the earth, or the like the photoperiodic energy that makes the flower bloom.

After the great Bengali poet Jibananada Das, nowhere except in Aminul Islam’s so many rivers, markets and bazars, fields and meadows, boatmen and boats, mythology and archeology, hills and plains, birds and flowers are found. He is indebted to his ancestral birthplace, the rivers flowing by his village, soil and nature of his village, He very innocently admitted this debt he bears in mind with gratitude. The Padma, the Shitalaxma, the Mohananda, the Pagla-Pangashmari and many other rivers are still fresh in his memory, and they move swiftly and smoothly in his dreams."

Shujayet Ullah, Director (Rtd), National Archives of Bangladesh pointed out, "Aminul Islam’s poetic style, his diction and expressions smack of archaeological overtone. History, tradition, social legacy & myth found novel meaning, new expression, in his poetry. Poets like Eliot, Jibonanda Das emphasized blending of tradition and individual talent for creative works. A poet is not a historian, but he does recreate history for the generation and while doing it his individual talent adds novelty to it. This he does by gathering experience from his day-to-day life, from his interactions with the society and by effective fusions with tradition and history. Thus we see how terms and terminologies used in officialdom crept into his poetry without much difficulty. Satiric tone, oblique comments and corrosive observation often find expression in sugar-coated language. And all this in no way impedes spontaneity of his poetry. And here, perhaps, lies Aminul Islam’s greatness.

It is a common knowledge that every successful poet enriches the language in which he writes poetry. Shakespeare’s and his contemporary’s contribution to the development of English language is known to the English speaking world. Aminul Islam gives new meaning or adds new dimension to the ordinary words which was hitherto unknown to the readers of Bengali language."

The poetic craftsmanship of Aminul Islam lies not only in what words he chooses for writing poems, but also how he places them to build the context and makes them highly meaningful in his poems; so clearly un-poetic, unmusical and even harsh words, by dint of his poetic handling, attain deeper meaning and create intense poetic essence".

== Publications of Poet Aminul Islam ==
=== Book of poetry ===
- Tantra Theke Doore (poetry)
- Mahananda Ek Sonali Nodir Naam (poetry)
- Shes Hemonter Jochona (poetry)
- Kuashar Barnamala (poetry)
- Path Bendhe Dilo Bondhonhin Gronthi (poetry)
- Swapner Halkhata (poetry)
- Jaul Chithi Neel Swapner Duar (poetry)
- Shoroter Train Shraboner Luggage (poetry)
- Kabitasamagra (poetry)
- Jochonar Raat Bedonar Behala (poetry)
- Amar Valobasa Tomar Savings Account (poetry)
- Pronoyee Nodir kache (poetry)
- Nirbachita Kabita (poetry)
- Valobasar Vugole (poetry)
- Ovibasi Valobasa (poetry)
- Joler Akkhore Lekha Prempato (poetry)
- Bachhai Kabita (poetry)

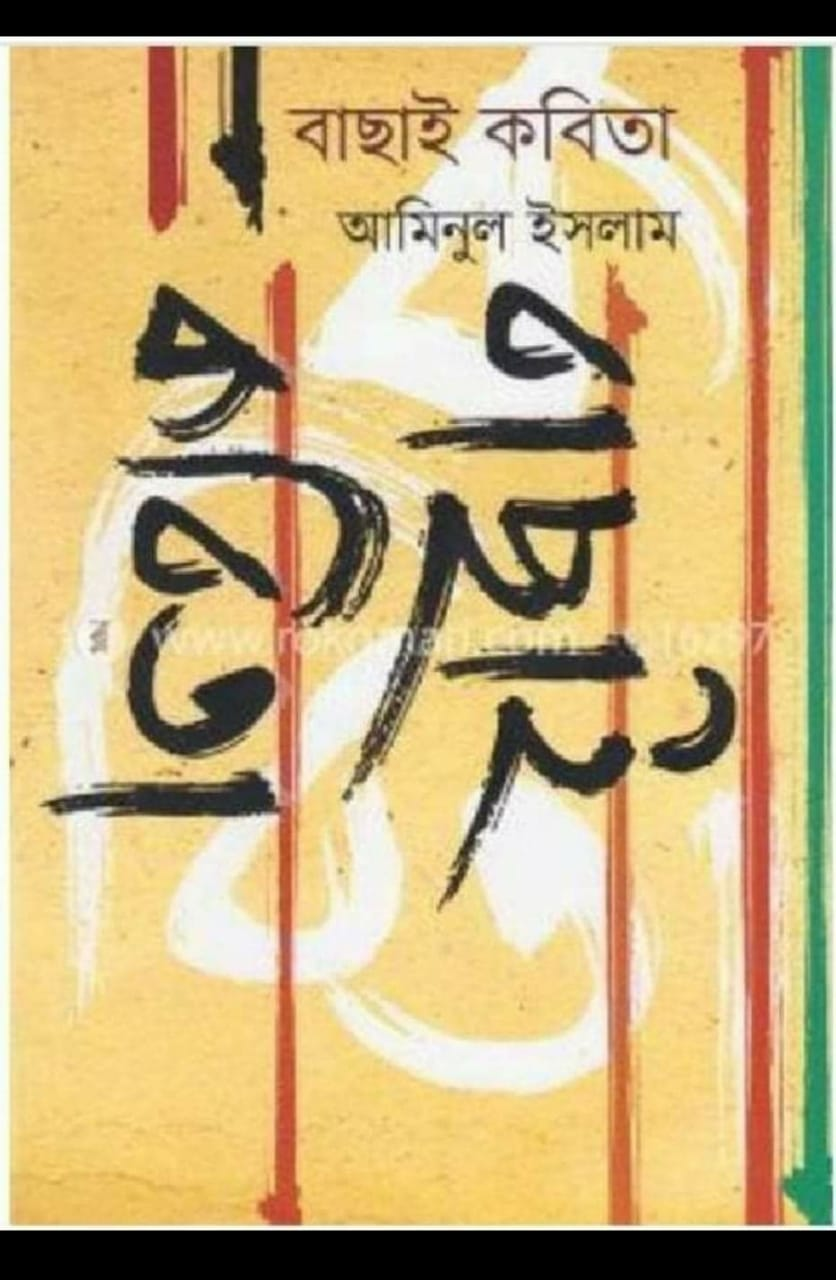

- Premikar Jonyo Saar-Sangkkhep (poetry)
- Hijoler Circuit House (poetry)
- Ramnar Kokil (poetry)
- Premsamagra (poetry)
- Mahanada Theke Madhumati (poetry)
- Motihari Bhalobasa (poetry)
- Porodashi Megh (poetry)

==== Articles Book ====
- Bishwayan, Bangla Kabita O Onnyannyo Probandha (collection of essays)

==== Research Book ====
- Nazrul Sangeet : Banir Baivab (research book on songs of Kazi Nazrul Islam)

==== Rhymes Books ====
- Dadur Bari (child rhymes)
- Fagun Elo shohorey (rhymes)
- Railer Gari Lichur Desh (rhymes)

== Awards and honours ==
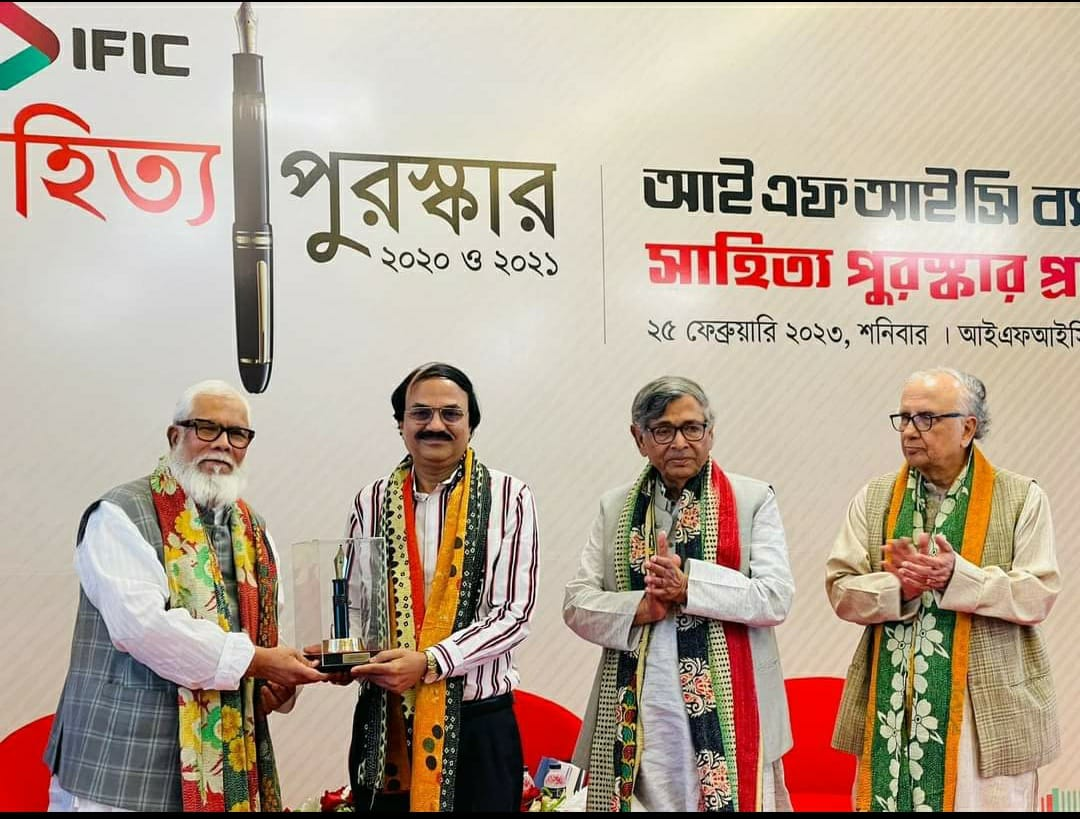

1. Bogra Lekhok Chakra Swikriti Award 2010.
2. Nazrulsangeet Shilpi Parishas Sommanona 2013
3. Abong Manush Sommanona 2017
4. Daag Sahitya Puroskar 2018
5. Kobikunjo Award 2021
6. Purbo Poschimm Literature Award 2021 (পূর্ব পশ্চিম সাহিত্য পুরস্কার ২০২১ )
7. IFIC Bank Literary Award 2021
8. Bindu Bisorgo Award, 2023 (বিন্দু বিসর্গ পদক, ২০২৩)
9. Grace Cottage Nazrul Somman 2023
