= Hasanlu Rural District =

Rural district in West Azerbaijan province, Iran

Hasanlu Rural District Persian: دهستان حسنلو
- Rural District
- Location within Iran
- Coordinates: 37°04′N 45°27′E
- Country: Iran
- Province: West Azerbaijan
- County: Naqadeh
- District: Mohammadyar
- Established: 1987
- Capital: Hasanlu

Population (2016)
  - Total: 3,875
- Time zone: UTC+3:30 (IRST)

Hasanlu Rural District (Persian: دهستان حسنلو) is in Mohammadyar District of Naqadeh County, West Azerbaijan province, Iran. Its capital is the village of Hasanlu.

== Demographics ==
=== Population ===
At the time of the 2006 National Census, the rural district's population was 5,184 in 1,165 households. There were 4,436 inhabitants in 1,260 households at the following census of 2011. The 2016 census measured the population of the rural district as 3,875 in 1,229 households. The most populous of its 26 villages was Hasanlu, with 1,277 people.

=== Other villages in the rural district ===
- Aqa Beyglu
- Azim Khanlu
- Barani-ye Ajam
- Barani-ye Kord
- Eslamabad
- Kahriz-e Ajam
- Sheykh Ahmad
- Shirvan Shahlu-ye Olya
- Vazneh
