= Mohammadyar District =

District in West Azerbaijan province, Iran

Mohammadyar District Persian: بخش محمدیار
- District
- Location within Iran
- Coordinates: 37°08′N 45°31′E
- Country: Iran
- Province: West Azerbaijan
- County: Naqadeh
- Established: 1996
- Capital: Mohammadyar

Population (2016)
  - Total: 21,147
- Time zone: UTC+3:30 (IRST)

Mohammadyar District (Persian: بخش محمدیار) is in Naqadeh County, West Azerbaijan province, Iran. Its capital is the city of Mohammadyar.

== Demographics ==
=== Population ===
At the time of the 2006 National Census, the district's population was 21,744 in 4,881 households. The following census in 2011 counted 21,318 people in 5,961 households. The 2016 census measured the population of the district as 21,147 inhabitants in 6,123 households.

=== Administrative divisions ===
Mohammadyar District Population
Administrative Divisions	2006	2011	2016
Almahdi RD	8,542	8,278	7,959
Hasanlu RD	5,184	4,436	3,875
Mohammadyar (city)	8,018	8,604	9,313
Total	21,744	21,318	21,147
RD = Rural District
