= List of Arabic given names =

== Masculine ==
=== A ===
- Abbad
- Abbas (name)
- Abd al-Uzza
- Abdus Salam (name)
- Abd Manaf (name)
- Abd Rabbo
- Abdel Fattah
- Abdel Nour
- Abdi
- Abdolreza
- Abdu
- Abdul
- Abdul Ahad
- Abdul Ali
- Abdul Alim
- Abdul Azim
- Abd al-Aziz
- Abdul Baqi
- Abdul Bari
- Abdul Basir
- Abdul Basit
- Abdul Ghaffar
- Abdul Ghani
- Abdul Hadi
- Abdul Hafiz
- Abdul Hai
- Abdul Hakim
- Abdul Halim
- Abdul Hamid
- Abdul Haq
- Abdul Hussein
- Abdul Jabbar
- Abdul Jalil
- Abdul Jamil
- Abdul Karim
- Abdul Khaliq
- Abdul Latif
- Abdul Majid
- Abdul Malik
- Abdul Mannan
- Abdul Monem
- Abdul Muttalib (name)
- Abdul Qadir
- Abdul Qayyum
- Abdul Quddus
- Abdul Rashid (name)
- Abdul Samad
- Abdul Sattar
- Abdul Wadud
- Abdul Wahhab
- Abdul Wahid
- Abdul Zahir
- Abdul Zahra
- Abdullah (name)
- Abdur Rab
- Abdur Rahim
- Abd al-Rahman
- Abdur Raqib
- Abdur Rauf
- Abdur Razzaq
- Abdus Sabur
- Abdus Shakur
- Abid
- Abidin
- Abo (name)
- Ab
- Abu Abdullah
- Abu al-Qasim
- Abu Bakr (name)
- Abu Hafs
- Abu Hamza
- Abu Nasir
- Abu Nasr
- Abu'l-Fadl
- Adam (given name)
- Adeel
- Adeem
- Adem
- Aden (name)
- Adham
- Adib
- Adil
- Adir
- Adli (name)
- Adnan (name)
- Afif (name)
- Ahad
- Ahmad
- Ahmed Tijani
- Ahsan
- Akeem
- Akif
- Akram
- Aladdin (name)
- Ali (name)
- Ali Naqi
- Ali Reza
- Alim
- Aman
- Aman Ali
- Amanullah
- Amer (name)
- Amil
- Amin (name)
- Amin al-Din
- Aminullah
- Amir (name)
- Amjad
- Ammar (name)
- Amr (name)
- Anas
- Anis
- Anisur Rahman
- Anjem
- Anwar
- Anwaruddin
- Aqeel
- Ari (name)
- Arif (given name)
- Asad
- Asadullah
- Asem
- Asghar
- Ashraf (name)
- Asif
- Asil
- Islam
- Ataullah
- Atif
- Atiq
- Atiqullah
- Awad
- Ayad
- Ayman/Aiman/Aimen/Aymen
- Ayub
- Azem
- Azeem
- Azhar (name)
- Azim
- Azimullah
- Aziz
- Azizullah
- Azizur Rahman
- Azmi
- Abu Bakr

=== B ===
- Badi
- Badr al-Din
- Bagher
- Baha
- Baha' al-Din
- Bahri
- Baki
- Bakir
- Bara (name)
- Barkat Ali
- Barkatullah
- Bashar
- Bashir (name)
- Basri
- Bilal (name)
- Bilel
- Billah
- Boualem
- Boulos
- Boutros
- Brahim (given name)
- Burhan
- Burhan al-Din

=== C ===
- Caden (given name)
- Chadli

=== D ===
- Daniel/Danyal
- Dastgir
- Daud (name)
- Dawoud
- Dhikrullah

=== E ===
- Ehsanullah
- Ekram

=== F ===
- Fadel
- Fahd
- Faheem
- Fahmi
- Fahri
- Faisal
- Faiz
- Faizan
- Faizullah
- Fakhr al-Din
- Fakhraddin
- Fakhruddin
- Faqir (given name)
- Faraj
- Farhat
- Farid
- Fariduddin
- Faris (given name)
- Farooq
- Fasih
- Fathallah
- Fathi
- Fatin
- Fawaz
- Fawzi
- Fayez
- Fazel
- Fazl
- Fazl ur Rahman
- Fazlallah
- Fazli
- Fazlul Haq
- Fazlul Karim
- Fikri
- Fouzan
- Fuad
- Furkan

=== G ===
- Gaffar
- Gamil (name)
- Ghanem
- Ghassan (given name)
- Ghiyath al-Din
- Ghulam
- Ghulam Faruq
- Ghulam Mohiuddin
- Gulzar

=== H ===
- Habib
- Habib ur Rahman
- Habibullah
- Hadem
- Hadi
- Hadid
- Hafeez
- Hafizullah
- Haitham
- Hajj
- Hajji (name)
- Hakam
- Hakim (name)
- Haldun
- Halim
- Halim (name)
- Hamdan
- Hamdi
- Hamid
- Hamid al-Din
- Hamidullah
- Hamza (name)
- Hani (name)
- Harbi (name)
- Hanif (given name)
- Harun
- Hashem
- Hashim
- Hasib (name)
- Hassan (given name)
- Hassim
- Hatem
- Hayatullah
- Haydar
- Hazem
- Heikal
- Hibat Allah
- Hichem
- Hidayatullah
- Hikmat (name)
- Hilmi
- Hisham (name)
- Hisham ud-Din
- Hossam
- Hurairah
- Husam ad-Din
- Hussein

=== I ===
- Ibrahim (name)
- Ibro
- Idris
- Idris (name)
- Ihab
- Ihsan (name)
- Ikhtiyar al-Din
- Ikramullah
- Ikrimah
- Ilyas
- Imad
- Imad al-Din
- Imran
- Imtiaz
- Inaam
- Inam-ul-Haq
- Inayatullah
- Iqbal
- Irfan (name)
- Isa (name)
- Ishak (name)
- Issam (name)
- Ishtiaq
- Iskandar
- Ismail (name)
- Ismat ad-Din
- Ismatullah
- Izz al-Din
- Izzat (given name)
- Izzatullah

=== J ===
- Ja'far
- Jabal (name)
- Jaber
- Jabir
- Jabr
- Jahid
- Jalal
- Jalal ad-Din
- Jamal
- Jamal ad-Din
- Jameel
- Jamil
- Jarrah (name)
- Jasem
- Jawad (name)
- Jawdat
- Jihad
- Jubayr
- Junayd
- Jurj
- Min

=== K ===
- Ka'b
- Kadeem
- Kadir
- Kadri (name)
- Kafeel
- Kamal ad-Din
- Kamil
- Karem
- Karim
- Kashif
- Kazem
- Khadem
- Khair ad-Din
- Khalfan
- Khalid
- Khalifah
- Khalil (name)
- Khalil-ur-Rehman
- Khamis (name)
- Kulthum

=== L ===
- Labib
- Lalji
- Latif
- Luay
- Lutfullah
- Lutfur Rahman

=== M ===
- Mahalati
- Mahbubur
- Mahdi
- Mahfuz (name)
- Mahir
- Mahmud
- Majid (name)
- Malik (name)
- Mamdouh
- Mansur
- Manzur
- Marwan
- Mashallah
- Masih (name)
- Masoud
- Maytham
- Mehdi
- Melhem
- Midhat
- Mizanur Rahman (disambiguation)
- Moatassem
- Moeen
- Moemen
- Mohammad Taqi
- Mohannad
- Mohy al-Din
- Mohyeddin
- Moin
- Moinuddin
- Mojtaba
- Moncef
- Moneim
- Mu'iz ad-Din
- Mua'dh
- Muammer
- Mubarak (name)
- Muhammad (name)
- Muharrem
- Muhibullah
- Muhsin
- Mukhtar
- Mumtaz
- Munib
- Munif
- Munir
- Muntazar
- Muntasir
- Murad
- Murtaza
- Musa (name)
- Muslim (name)
- Mustafa
- Muzaffar

=== N ===
- Nabih
- Nabil
- Nadeem
- Nader
- Nadir (name)
- Naguib
- Nahyan
- Naif
- Naim
- Naji
- Najib
- Najibullah
- Najim
- Najm
- Najm al-Din
- Naqibullah
- Naseeb
- Naseer
- Nasim
- Nasir
- Nasir al-Din
- Nasrallah
- Nasri
- Nasser (name)
- Nassif
- Nasuh
- Nawaf
- Nawaz
- Nowfal
- Nazif
- Nazim
- Nazimuddin
- Nazira (name)
- Nazmi
- Nihad
- Nimatullah
- Nizam al-Din
- Nu'man
- Numan
- Nuh (name)
- Nur
- Nur al-Din
- Nuri (name)
- Nurullah
- Nusrat

=== O ===
- Omar (name)
- Osama (name)
- Othman (name)

=== Q ===
- Qaid
- Qamar ud-Din
- Qasim (name)
- Qasymbek
- Quddus
- Qudratullah
- Qusay
- Qutb
- Qutb ad-Din

=== R ===
- Rabih
- Raed
- Rafiq
- Rahim
- Rahman (name)
- Rahmatullah
- Rahmi
- Rajab (name)
- Rajaei
- Raji
- Ramiz
- Ramzan
- Rakibul
- Rakib
- Ramzi
- Rashad
- Rashid (name)
- Rashid al-Din
- Rasul (given name)
- Rayan
- Redouane
- Reza
- Riad (name)
- Riaz (name)
- Ridwan (name)
- Rifat
- Rizqallah
- Ruhi
- Ruhullah
- Rukn al-Din
- Rushdi

=== S ===
- Sa'd al-Din
- Seif ilislam
- Sa‘id
- Saud
- Saad
- Saadallah
- Sabri
- Sabah ad-Din
- Saddam (name)
- Sadik
- Sadr al-Din
- Safi (given name)
- Safi al-Din
- Safiullah
- Sahir
- Saif
- Saifullah
- Saifur Rahman
- Sajid
- Sajjad
- Sakina (given name)
- Salah (name)
- Salah ad-Din (name)
- Saleh (name)
- Salem (name)
- Salim
- Salman (name)
- Samadu
- Samee
- Samer (name)
- Sami (name)
- Samir
- Samirah
- Samiullah
- Sanaullah
- Saqib
- Sardar
- Sarmad
- Satam
- Sattar
- Sayf al-Din
- Sayyid (name)
- Seghatoleslam
- Shaban (name)
- Shad
- Shafiq ur Rahman
- Shafiqullah
- Shahid (name)
- Shahrukh (name)
- Shakeel (name)
- Shakir
- Shams
- Shams al-Din
- Shamsur Rahman
- Sharaf al-Din
- Sharifullah
- Shawkat
- Shawki
- Shiraz (name)
- Shihab al-Din
- Shujauddin
- Shukri
- Sidique
- Sidqi
- Sirajuddin
- Suhail
- Suleiman
- Sultan (name)
- Shaheed

=== T ===
- Taha (name)
- Taher (name)
- Tahmid
- Tahsin
- Talal
- Talat
- Talat (given name)
- Talhah (name)
- Talib (name)
- Taqi
- Taqi al-Din
- Tarazi
- Tariq
- Tawfik
- Tayeb
- Tayfur
- Tufail
- Turki (name)

=== U ===
- Ubay (name)
- Ubayd Allah
- Uday
- Uthman (name)
- Usama

=== W ===
- Wadih
- Wadud
- Wael
- Wafi
- Wahed
- Wahid
- Wajdi
- Wajid (name)
- Wajih
- Waleed
- Waliullah (name)
- Wasim
- Wazir
- Wissem

=== Y ===
- Yacine
- Yadollah
- Yahya (name)
- Yakub
- Yahir
- Yasser
- Yunus
- Yusha (given name)
- Yusuf
- Yusuf Ali

=== Z ===
- Zafar (name)
- Zafarullah
- Zafer
- Zahed
- Zahir
- Zahir al-Din
- Zaid
- Zaim (name)
- Zainal
- Zainal Abidin
- Zakariya
- Zaki
- Zane
- Zayn ad-Din
- Zeeshan
- Ziad
- Ziauddin
- Ziaur Rahman
- Zubayr (name)

== Feminine ==
=== A ===
- Abeer
- Abiha
- Adela (name)
- Afaf
- Afreen
- Aisha
- Aliya
- Alya (name)
- Amalia (given name)
- Amina (disambiguation)
- Amira (name)
- Arwa
- Ashraqat
- Ashfa
- Asma (given name)
- Atikah
- Aya (given name)
- Azhar (name)
- Azra (name)
- Aziza (name)

=== B ===
- Boutheina
- Bushra
- Besma

=== C ===
- Chaima

=== D ===
- Dalal (name)
- Dalia (given name)
- Dana (given name)
- Dareen
- Dina

=== E ===
- Eliana
- Esma
- Eva (name)

=== F ===
- Fadwa
- Farah (name)
- Farida (given name)
- Fatima (given name)
- Feyrouz
- Fouz

=== H ===
- Habiba
- Hafsa
- Hajra
- Hala (given name)
- Halima
- Hamida
- Hana (given name)
- Hanifa
- Havva
- Hawa (given name)
- Hayat
- Hessa (name)
- Huda (given name)

=== I ===
- Ibtisam
- Inaam
- Ireen

=== J ===
- Jamila
- Jana (given name)
- Jawahir
- Jena (given name)
- Jennifer (given name)
- Jessica (name)
- Joelle
- Joud
- Jouri
- Julia
- Jumana

=== K ===
- Kareena
- Karima
- Katya
- Khadija (name)
- Khairunnisa
- Khawlah

=== L ===
- Lama (name)
- Lamia (given name)
- Lana (given name)
- Lara (name)
- Latifa
- Layan
- Leila (name)
- Lina
- Lulwa

=== M ===
- Madiha
- Maha (name)
- Mahmuna
- Mai (Arabic name)
- Malika (given name)
- Maria (given name)
- Marwa (given name)
- Maryam (name)
- Maya (given name)
- Maysoon
- Melek
- Melissa
- Mila (given name)
- Mira (given name)
- Mirna (name)
- Mona (name)
- Munira

=== N ===
- Nadia
- Nadine (given name)
- Nafisa
- Nahla (name)
- Naila (name)
- Naima
- Najat
- Najma
- Nalini
- Nasim
- Nasrin
- Natasha
- Nathalie
- Nawal
- Nayla
- Naziha
- Nazira (name)
- Nehal
- Nejla
- Nermin
- Nezha (given name)
- Nina (name)

=== Q ===
- Qamar ud-Din
- Qistina

=== R ===
- Rabia
- Rahima
- Rana (name)
- Rania
- Rashida
- Reem (given name)
- Riffat
- Rimas
- Rita (given name)
- Ruqayya

=== S ===
- Saadia (given name)
- Sabah (given name)
- Sabiha
- Subiksha (given name)
- Safaa
- Safiya
- Sahar (name)
- Saida (name)
- Saira
- Sajida
- Sakhra
- Sakina
- Saliba
- Salma
- Samar (name)
- Samira
- Samiya
- Sanaa
- Sandra (given name)
- Sania
- Sarah (given name)
- Selma (name)
- Shahd
- Shakira
- Shams
- Shatha
- Sherine (name)
- Shumaila
- Siham
- Suha (given name)
- Sumaya (given name)
- Sonia
- Soraida (name)

=== T ===
- Tahira
- Tala (name)
- Tamara (given name)
- Tanisha (name)
- Tanya (name)
- Tara (given name)
- Taslima
- Tina (given name)
- Tuba (given name)

=== U ===
- Umm Kulthum (name)

=== W ===
- Wafaa (name)
- Waliya (name)
- Wajahat (Name)
- Wajhat (Name)

=== Y ===
- Yamina (name)
- Yara (given name)
- Yasmin (given name)

=== Z ===
- Zahra (name)
- Zalayha
- Zakiya
- Zaynab (name)
- Zuhal
- Zoraida

== Unisex ==
=== A ===
- Amal (given name)

=== C ===
- Chadi

=== D ===
- Dana (given name)

=== F ===
- Farrah

=== I ===
- Ismat

=== L ===
- Laden

=== N ===
- Nakia (name)
- Noor (name)
- Nair

=== W ===
- Wafaa (name)

=== Z ===
- Zain (name)
- Zia
- Zial (name)
