= Soha (disambiguation) =

Soha is a village of Haripur District in the Khyber Pakhtunkhwa province of Pakistan

Soha may also refer to:

- Soha, Iran, village in Iran
- Soha Junction, South Korea
- SoHa controversy, a controversy regarding South Harlem
- Soha (given name)
