= Tim Arson =

American professional wrestler (1976–2015)

- Calkins as The Zombie on ECW in 2006

Personal information
- Born: Timothy R. Calkins Jr. December 27, 1976 Eltingville, Staten Island, New York City, New York, U.S.
- Died: January 7, 2015 (aged 38) Haskell, New Jersey, U.S.
- Children: 1
- Website: Tim Arson on Myspace

Professional wrestling career
- Ring name(s): Tim Arson; The Zombie; Afterburn
- Billed height: 6 ft 2 in (1.88 m)
- Billed weight: 245 lb (111 kg)
- Billed from: Staten Island, New York; The Graveyard (as The Zombie ECW)
- Trained by: Johnny Rodz
- Debut: 2001

Timothy R. Calkins Jr. (December 27, 1976 – January 7, 2015) was an American professional wrestler, known by his ring name Tim Arson, who worked in the Puerto Rican-based New Wrestling Stars and World Wrestling Council, as well as American independent promotions. In 2006, he appeared as The Zombie on the debut episode of World Wrestling Entertainment's ECW on Sci Fi television show.

== Career ==
=== Early career (2001–2006) ===
Trained by former WWF wrestler Johnny Rodz, Calkins made his debut in 2001 wrestling in Northeastern independent promotions including USA Pro Wrestling as a member of the stable Canadian Impact Alliance, winning the USAPW United States and vacant New York Championship in a four-way match with USAPW United States Champion "Hardrock" Ken Sweeney, Low Rida and Stryker on October 20 before losing the titles to Kid Kruel a week later. In March 2003, he participated in a gauntlet match defeating Poppalicious and Live Wyre before losing to Reefer. He would also appear in Mikey Whipwreck's New York Wrestling Connection defeating Guillotine LeGrande and Disturbed Damien Dragon in a three-way match at NYWC Rampage in Deer Park, New York, on July 12, 2003.

Winning a battle royal to regain the vacant USAPW New York State Championship on February 14, 2004, he would defend the title for several months before the title became inactive during the year. He would later lose to Kid Kruel in a three-way match with Billy Reil for the vacant USAPW United States title on February 26, 2005.

=== Puerto Rico and WWE (2006) ===
In early 2006, he began touring Puerto Rico with the World Wrestling Council defeating The D'Jour Twins in a handicap match at a show in Carolina, Puerto Rico, on March 4, 2006. On March 19 at a New Wrestling Stars event held at the Municipal Coliseum at Añasco, Puerto Rico, Calkins became involved in a fight between female wrestlers Yaritza and Sandra. He later acted as the special referee during the main event between Huracán Castillo and El Diamante later that night. After Castillo defeated Diamante, he and Diamante attacked Castillo with a number of other villains.

During the next few weeks, he also defeated Bad Boy, Bronco and Hunter in singles matches and teamed with Black Pain against Abbad and Eddie Colón during April. Shortly after defeating Bronco I at the Bruiser Broady Memorial Weekend in Ponce, Puerto Rico, on April 28, he defeats Rickie Vallens for the NWS Heavyweight Championship two days later on April 30, 2006.

Within several weeks, he also teamed with Rico Suave defeating America's Most Wanted for the WWC Tag Team titles on June 3, 2006. Feuding with Glamour Boy Shane over the NWS Heavyweight title, he eventually defeated Shane in San Sebastián, Puerto Rico, on June 3, 2006. Due to the pre-match stipulations, Shane was forced to leave the promotion.

=== WWE (2006) ===
In June 2006, Calkins appeared as Tim Arson in a dark match on WWE Raw against Matt Striker on June 12 which eventually aired on WWE Heat. The following night, he appeared on ECW as The Zombie in which he lost to The Sandman after taking several shots to the head from The Sandman's Singapore cane.

=== Return to Puerto Rico (2006-2007) ===
Returning to the WWC the following month, he and Rico Suave successfully defended the titles against SWAT Team on July 21 before losing the WWC Tag Team titles to Huracan Castillo and Chris Joel at the WWC supercard Aniversario 33 on August 12, 2006. Although recapturing the titles on September 4, they lost to Chris Joel and Fire Blaze less than a week later. He and Suave continued to lose matches to Hammett and Rick Stanley as well as rematches against Huracan Castillo and Chris Joel later during the year as well as single matches to Castillo and Jose Rivera Jr..

Feuding with Glamour Boy Shane over the NWS Heavyweight title during early 2007, he defeated "Cowboy" Justin Nice before losing to former tag team partner Rico Suave and Huracan Castillo in a Handicap match on January 20, 2007. In May 2007, he married his long term valet Yaritza.

Later that year, he headlined the IWA Puerto Rico supercard Christmas in Puerto Rico in a match against IWA Heavyweight Champion Blitz in Bayamón, Puerto Rico, on December 15, 2007. He had at one point defeated Blitz for the title, illegally using the ropes to pin Blitz. However, Invader #1 came out and informed the referee what had happened and the decision was reversed.

=== Later career (2007–2015) ===
After leaving Puerto Rico in 2007, he went to work in the independents in New Jersey.

Form 2008 to 2012, he worked in New Jersey's National Wrestling Superstars. Also in New York's Victory Pro Wrestling from 2007 to 2012.

In 2014 he wrestled in Atomic Championship Wrestling's "Youth Gone Wild" in Pennsylvania where he went up against Malcolm and was victorious, despite the fact that Malcolm used an illegal object throughout the match.

== Death ==
Calkins died at the age of 38 on January 7, 2015, in Haskell, New Jersey. Tim's brother, Greg Calkins, has stated that the cause of death was cardiac arrest.

== Championships and accomplishments ==
- New Wrestling Stars
  - NWS Heavyweight Championship (1 time)
- USA Xtreme Wrestling
  - UXW United States Heavyweight Championship (1 time)
  - UXW New York State Championship (1 time)
- World Wrestling Council
  - WWC Tag Team Championship (2 times) – with Rico Suave

== See also ==
- List of premature professional wrestling deaths
