= Rashida =

- Gender: Female

Origin
- Word/name: Arabic
- Meaning: Righteous; wise; knows her own way; "mature", and "of true faith"

Rashida (رشيدة) is a feminine Arabic given name. Notable people with the name include:

- Rashida al-Qaili, Yemeni journalist
- Rashida Beal (born 1994), American soccer player
- Rashida Bee, Indian activist
- Rashida Bello, Nigerian politician and wife of Kogi State Governor
- Rashida Bumbray, American curator, choreographer, author, visual and performing arts critic
- Rashida Gonzalez Robinson (born 1980), American DJ
- Rashida Haque Choudhury (1926–?), Indian politician
- Rashida Jolley, American harpist
- Rashida Jones (born 1976), American actress
- Rashida Jones (television executive) (born 1980/81), president of cable news network MSNBC
- Rashida Khanum, Pakistani politician
- Rashida Manjoo, South African professor and activist
- Rashida Riffat, Pakistani politician
- Rashida Strober, American playwright and activist
- Rashida Tlaib (born 1976), American politician
- Rashida Yousuf, Maldivian politician and diplomat
- Reshide Khanum (1912–1990), one of the first group of women elected to parliament in China
