= Mozilla Algeria =

Technology non-profit

Mozilla Algeria is an Algerian non-profit organisation and a subsidiary of Mozilla established in June 2011 by two University of Science and Technology, Houari Boumediene students, Majda and Moncef.

The idea arose after the first meeting of the Mozilla Arab communities in Oman, where they noticed that there were student communities in Tunisia, Jordan and other countries so they decided to create a subsidiary where the members organize local events on behalf of the foundation and are keen to maintain the web site and communicate about the goals, achievements and important news of the foundation, as well as answer the questions of inquirers about the foundation.
