= Riffat =

Riffat feminine given name and surname of Arabic origin. It means high, high rank, or superiority. Notable people with the name include:

== Given name ==
- Riffat Abbasi, Pakistani politician
- Riffat Arif, birth name of Sister Zeph (born 1983/84), Pakistani activist
- Riffat Aziz, Pakistani politician
- Riffat Hassan (born 1943), Pakistani-American theologian and a leading Islamic feminist scholar of the Qur'an
- Riffat Akbar Swati (born 1946), Pakistani politician

== Surname ==
- Rashida Riffat, Pakistani politician
- Saffa Riffat (born 1954), British scientist, president of the World Society of Sustainable Energy Technology
