= Constituency WR-17 =

Reserved seat in a Pakistani provincial assembly

- Provincial constituency for the Khyber Pakhtunkhwa Assembly

Current constituency
- Member: Rashda Riffat

Constituency WR-17 is a reserved seat for women in the Khyber Pakhtunkhwa Assembly.

== 2013 ==
- Rashida Riffat

== See also ==
- Constituency PK-12 (Nowshera-I)
- Constituency PK-13 (Nowshera-II)
- Constituency PK-14 (Nowshera-III)
- Constituency PK-15 (Nowshera-IV)
- Constituency PK-16 (Nowshera-V)
