= Yusha =

Yusha may refer to:

- Yusha (given name), Arabic form of Joshua
  - Joshua in Islamic history
- Yūsha or Yuusha (勇者), Japanese for "hero" or "brave person"
  - Particularly Yūsha, robot toys and anime in the Brave series
  - Yuusha, a character in the anime series Endro!
  - "Yūsha" (song), by Yoasobi, 2023
- Yusha, ayurvedic lentil soup in Sattvic diet
