= Sabri =

- Pronunciation: Arabic: [sˤabriː] Egyptian Arabic: [sˤɑbɾi] Turkish: [sabɾi]
- Language: Arabic

Origin
- Meaning: Patient
- Region of origin: Arabia

Sabri (Arabic: صبري) is a masculine given name and surname of Arabic origin. Notable people with the name include:

== Given name ==
- Sabri Ali (born 2000), Djiboutian footballwe
- Sabri Ameri (born 1993), Tunisian footballer
- Sabri Anar (1966–2026), Turkish Chaldean Catholic hierarch
- Sabri al-Asali (1903–1976), Syrian politician
- Sabri Azit (born 1966), Malaysian politician
- Sabri Khalil al-Banna (1937–2002), Palestinian militant leader
- Sabri Benkahla, American Islamic theologian and lecturer
- Sabri Berkel (1907–1993), Turkish-Albanian modernist painter
- Sabri Boukadoum (born 1958), Algerian diplomat
- Sabri Boumelaha (born 1989), French-Algerian footballer
- Sabri Çakır (1955–2024), Turkish-German poet and teacher
- Sabri Dino (1942–1990), Turkish footballer
- Sabri Ergun (1918–2006), Turkish chemical engineer
- Sabri Gençsoy (1918–??), Turkish footballer
- Sabri Gharbi (born 1987), Algerian footballer
- Sabri Godo (1929–2011), Albanian writer and politician
- Sabri Guendouz (born 2000), French footballer
- Sabri Gürses (born 1972), Turkish writer
- Sabri Al-Haiki (born 1961), Yemeni painter, critic, and poet
- Sabri Hamadeh (1902–1976), Lebanese politician
- Sabri Hamiti (born 1950), Albanian writer, literary scholar, and academic
- Sabri Ben Hessen (born 1996), Tunisian footballer
- Sabri Jaballah (born 1973), Tunisian footballer
- Sabri Jiryis (born 1938), Arab-Israeli writer and lawyer
- Sabri Kaliç (1966–2012), Turkish film director
- Sabri Kalkandelen (1862–1943), Turkish poet and librarian
- Sabri Khan (1927–2015), Indian musician
- Sabri Khattab (born 1990), Norwegian-Egyptian footballer
- Sabri Kiraz (1918–1985), Turkish football manager
- Sabri Lamouchi (born 1971), French football player and manager
- Sabri Lontadila (born 1992), French basketball player
- Sabri Mosbah (born 1982), Tunisian singer, composer, and guitarist
- Sabri Moudallal (1918–2006), Syrian singer and composer
- Sabri Mohd Noor, Malaysian politician
- Sabri Peqini (1926–2021), Albanian football player and manager
- Sabri Pilkati, Albanian politician
- Sabri Raheel (born 1987), Egyptian footballer
- Sabri Al-Ramahi (1948–2026), Iraqi radio director, television director, and documentary filmmaker
- Sabri Sahar (born 1992), Malaysian footballer
- Sabri Sarıoğlu (born 1984), Turkish footballer
- Sabri Esat Siyavuşgil (1907–1968), Turkish poet, writer, psychologist, translator, and encyclopedist
- Sabri Tabet (born 1977), French footballer
- Sabri Ülker (1920–2012), Turkish industrialist and businessman
- Sabri Yirmibeşoğlu (1928–2016), Turkish general

== Surname ==
- Ali Sabri (1920–1991), Egyptian politician
- Amjad Sabri (1976–2016), Pakistani qawwali singer
- Ghulam Farid Sabri (1930–1994), Pakistani qawwali singer
- Hend Sabri (born 1979), Tunisian actress
- Maqbool Ahmed Sabri (1945–2011), Pakistani qawwali singer
- Masud Sabri (1886–1952), Uyghur politician
- Mostafa Sabri (born 1984), Iranian footballer
- Naji Sabri (born 1951), Iraqi politician
- Nazli Sabri (1894–1978), Queen consort of Egypt
- Osman Sabri (1905–1993), Kurdish politically active poet
- Rais Anis Sabri (born 1993), Indian qawwali singer
- Shaarib Sabri (born 1988), Indian singer and composer
- Shabab Sabri (born 1979), Indian singer
- Toshi Sabri (born 1984), Indian singer and composer
- Yasmine Sabri (born 1987), Egyptian actress

== See also ==
- Sabri, Iran, a village in the Razavi Khorasan province of Iran
- Chishti Sabri, Sufi sub order of the Chishti Order
  - Alauddin Sabir Kaliyari, Indian Sufi saint, founder of the order
