= Safaa =

Arabic name

Sanaa, or Safa (Arabic: صفاء), is the gender-neutral name derived from the Arabic word Safa, which means "purity", "innocence". Notable people with this name include:

- Safa Al Hashem (born 1964), Kuwait businesswoman and a politician
- Safaa Al Sarai (1993-2019), Iraqi activist
- Safaa Erruas (born 1976), Moroccan artist
- Safaa Fathy (born 1958), Egyptian poet, documentary filmmaker, playwright, and essayist
- Safaa Hadi (born 1998), Iraqi footballer
- Safaa Kumari (born 1963), Syrian virologist

== See also ==
- List of Arabic given names
