= Jabr =

Jabr may refer to:

== People ==
- Jabr (slave), Christian slave
- Jabr Muadi, Druze Arab politician
- Muhammad bin Jabr Al Thani, Qatari politician
- Baqir Jabr al-Zubeidi, Iraqi politician
- Mujahid ibn Jabr, Tabi‘un
- Rabih Jabr, Lebanese engineer

== Other uses ==
- Habil Jabr District, district of the Lahij Governorate, Yemen
- Jabr-e Joghrafiyaei, Mohsen Namjoo album
- Al-Jabr, a seminal Arabic treatise on algebra written in Baghdad around 820 CE
