= Ehsanullah =

Name list

Ehsanullah or more correctly Ihsanullah is a male Muslim given name, composed of the elements Ihsan and Allah. Notable people with the name include:

- Ehsanullah (Guantanamo detainee 523), released May 9, 2003
- Ehsanullah Ehsan (disambiguation), multiple people
- Ehsanullah Khan, Pakistani politician
- Ehsanullah Reki, Pakistani politician
