= Nermin =

Nermin, Narmin, or Nermine (نرمين or نەرمین) is a Persian feminine given name (in French also transcribed as Nermine). It means softness, delicate and it is used to describe kindness. The word Narm means soft in Persian, and "in" is a descriptive postfix. As Nermin, it is also given as a male name in Bosnia and Herzegovina. The masculine Bosnian name is again feminized as Nermina.

Notable people with the name include:

== Nermin ==
=== Women ===
- Nermin Bezmen (born 1954), Turkish novelist
- Nermin Vlora Falaschi (1921–2004), Albanian intellectual
- Nermin Farukî (1904–1991), Turkish sculptor
- Nermin Al-Fiqy (born 1972), Egyptian actress
- Nermin Gözükırmızı (born 1951), Turkish professor
- Nermin Neftçi (1924–2003), Turkish lawyer, politician and former government minister
- Nermine Hammam (born 1967), Egyptian artist
- Nermin Othman (born 1948), Iraqi government minister
- Nermin Abadan Unat (1921–2025), Turkish academic

=== Men ===
- Nermin Bašić (born 1983), Bosnian football manager
- Nermin Čeliković (born 1980), Bosnian footballer
- Nermin Crnkić (1992–2023), Bosnian footballer
- Nermin Grbic, Canadian hairstylist
- Nermin Hadžiahmetović (born 1953), Bosnian football manager
- Nermin Haskić (born 1989), Bosnian footballer
- Nermin Jamak (born 1986), Bosnian footballer
- Nermin Karić (born 1999), Bosnian-Swedish footballer
- Nermin Nikšić (born 1960), Bosnian politician
- Nermin Purić (born 1981), Bosnian politician
- Nermin Šabić (born 1973), Bosnian footballer
- Nermin Useni (born 1980), Serbian footballer
- Nermin Vazda (born 1967), Bosnian footballer
- Nermin Zolotić (born 1993), Bosnian footballer
- Nermin Mehmedovic (born 2005), Bosnian man

== Nermina ==
- Nermina Lukac (born 1990), Swedish actress

== Nermine ==
- Nermine Hammam (born 1967), Egyptian artist
