= Adir =

Adir or ADIR may refer to:

- Air Data Inertial Reference Unit (ADIRU), a key component of the Air Data Inertial Reference System (ADIRS), which supplies air data and inertial reference information to aircraft systems
- Adir, meaning "Strong One," one of the names of God in Judaism
- Adir Hu, a hymn sung by Jews worldwide at the Passover Seder
- The F-35I "Adir", a customised variant of the Lockheed Martin F-35 Lightning II developed specifically for the Israeli Air Force
- Autism Diagnostic Interview-Revised, a structured interview conducted with the parents of individuals who have been referred for the evaluation of possible autism or autism spectrum disorders

== People ==
- Ilana Adir (born 1941), Israeli Olympic sprinter
- Adir Ascalon, surrealist painter and sculptor, son of Maurice Ascalon
- Adir Maman (born 1991), Israeli footballer
- Adir Miller (born 1974), Israeli actor and comedian
- Adir Zik (1939–2005), Israeli television producer and journalist

== See also ==
- Adheera, fictional villain in the 2022 Indian film KGF: Chapter 2, played by Sanjay Dutt
