= Bagher =

Bagher or Baghir is the Persian equivalent of the Arabic name Baqir. Notable people with the name include:

== Given name ==
- Bagher Hashemi (born 1994), Iranian footballer
- Bagher Kalhor (born 1979), Iranian alpine skier
- Bagher Kazemi (1892–1977), Iranian politician
- Bagher Larijani (born 1961), Iranian politician
- Bagher Najafi (1948–2002), Iranian scholar of Iranian Studies
- Bagher Niari (born 1998), Iranian football player
- Bagher Shirazi (1936–2007), Iranian professor and architect
- Baghir Suleimanov (1959–2026), Azerbaijani petroleum scientist and academic
- Mohammad Bagher Ghalibaf (born 1961), Iranian politician and military officer
- Mohammad Bagher Sadeghi (born 1989), Iranian footballer
