= Wadud =

Wadud may refer to:

- Abdul Wadud, several people
- Al Wadud, Bangladeshi cricketer
- Amina Wadud (born 1952), American Islamic feminist
- Wadud Ahmad, American poet
- Al-Wadūd (Arabic: الودود), one of the names of God in Islam
