= Ihab =

Ihab is a given name of Arabic origin. Notable people with the name include:

== Given name ==
- Ihab al-Ghussein (1979–2024), spokesman of the Interior Ministry of the Palestinian National Authority based in the Hamas-administrated Gaza Strip
- Ihab Al-Sherif (1954–2005), served as Egypt's ambassador to Iraq until Iraqi kidnappers murdered him in July 2005
- Ihab El-Masry (born 1985), Egyptian footballer
- Ihab Hassan (1925–2015), American literary theorist and writer born in Egypt
- Ihab Ilyas (born 1973), computer scientist
- Ihab Makhlouf (1973–2024), Syrian mobile phone industry executive
- Ihab Saqr, believed to have coordinated the bombing of the Egyptian embassy in Islamabad
- Ihab Shoukri (died 2008), Northern Irish paramilitary

== See also ==
- I have a Bee (IHAB), worldwide organization of hobby beekeepers
- International Habitation Module, the main habitat module of the Lunar Gateway station, to be built by the European Space Agency (ESA) in collaboration with the Japan Aerospace Exploration Agency (JAXA)
