= Saffa Riffat =

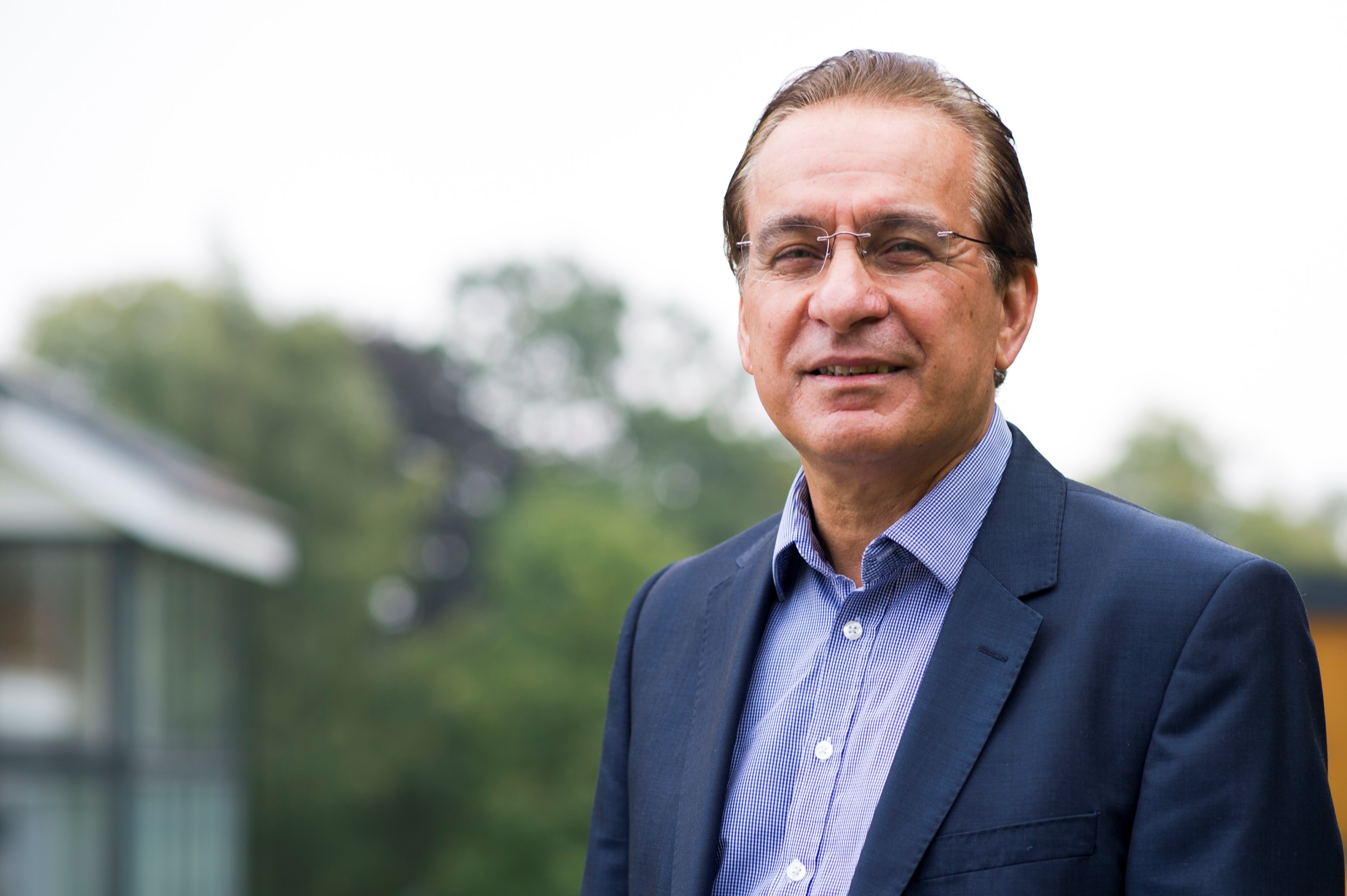
- Born: Saffa Riffat; 1 July 1954 (age 72)
- Education: Oxford University
- Awards: Euro Solar Prize Award; Energy Globe Award; UK Engineering and Innovation Awards; Rushlight Awards; CIBSE Baker Silver Medal
- Scientific career
- Workplaces: University of Nottingham
- Website: www.nottingham.ac.uk/engineering/departments/abe/people/saffa.riffat

Saffa Riffat is President of the World Society of Sustainable Energy Technology, Chair in Sustainable Energy Technology at the University of Nottingham and the head of Nottingham's Architecture, Climate and Environment Group. He is the editor-in-chief of the International Journal of Low-Carbon Technologies, published by Oxford University Press. In 2018, he was elected to the European Academy of Sciences.

== Early life and education ==
Saffa Riffat was born on 1 July 1954. He was educated at Keble College in Oxford University and earned a Doctor of Philosophy degree in 1986 and Doctor of Science in 1997.
