= Ehsanullah Ehsan =

Ehsanullah Ehsan may refer to:

- Ehsanullah Ehsan (banker) (died 1997), chairman of the Taliban's Central Bank
- Ehsanullah Ehsan (Taliban spokesman), a current spokesman of the Taliban
- Ehsanullah Ehsan (educator), a school principal and director the Afghan-Canadian Community Centre in Kandahar
