= Abu Nasr =

Abu Nasr, Abu Nasar, or Abu Naser is a masculine given name of Arabic origin. Notable people with the name include:

== Given name ==
=== Abu Nasar ===
- Abu Nasar Khan Choudhury (1935–2026), Indian politician

=== Abu Naser ===
- Abu Naser Chowdhury, Bangladeshi politician

=== Abu Nasr ===
- Abu Nasr Ahmad ibn Fadl (died 1126), Seljuk vizier
- Abu Nasr Farahi (died 1242), Persian poet and lexicographer
- Abu Nasr Farsi, Ghaznavid statesman, general, writer, and poet
- Abu Nasr Husayn II, Rawadid amir of Azarbaijan
- Abu Nasr al-Jawhari, Iranian lexicographer and author
- Abu Nasr Abdul Kahhar (died 1687), sultan of Banten
- Abu Nasr Mamlan II, Rawadid amir of Azarbaijan
- Abu Nasr Mansur (960–1036), Iranian mathematician and astronomer
- Abu Nasr Muhammad (died 1015/16), ruler of Gharchistan
- Abu'l-Nasr Muhammad (died 1010), Farighunid ruler of Guzgan
- Abu Nasr Mushkan (died 1039/40), Ghaznavid official
- Abu Nasr Sa'd of Granada (1398–1465), Nasrid ruler of the Emirate of Granada
- Abu Nasr ibn al-Sari (died 822), Abbasid governor
- Abu Nasr as-Sarraj (died 988), Iranian Sufi mystic, ascetic, and writer
- Abu Nasr al-Tunisi, Tunisian alleged terrorist
- Abu Nasr Waheed (1878–1953), Bangladeshi Islamic scholar, educationist, author, and politician

== Places ==
- Abu Nasr (Iran), village in Iran
