= Nasim =

Nassim (Arabic: نسيم) also transliterated as Nacim, Naseem, Nasseem, Nasim, Nesim or Nessim, is a unisex name meaning "gentle breeze, fresh air". It is mostly used in Middle Eastern and South Asian cultures and language groups. It may refer to:

== Company ==
- Nasim Sdn Bhd, a member of Naza Group of Companies

== People ==
=== Men ===
==== Nacim ====
- Nacim Abdelali (born 1981), Algerian footballer
- Nacim Dendani (born 2006), Tunisian footballer

==== Naseem ====
- Naseem Hamed (born 1974), Yemeni-British boxer
- Naseem Hijazi (1910–1996), Pakistani Urdu writer
- Naseem Kharal (1939–1978), Pakistani short story writer
- Naseem Khushi, Pakistani cricketer
- Naqeebullah Mehsud (1991–2018), also known as "Naseem Ullah", a Pakistani national ethnic Pashtun who was killed in a fake police encounter
- Farogh Naseem (born 1969), Pakistani lawyer
- Hassan Evan Naseem (1984–2003), Maldivian drug offender killed in jail
- Mohammad Naseem (1924–2014), Pakistani-British doctor and politician
- Mohamed Tawfik Naseem Pasha (1871–1938), Egyptian politician

==== Nasim ====
- Nasim Ahmed (cricketer), Pakistani cricketer
- Nasim Amrohvi (1908–1987), Pakistani Urdu poet
- Nasim Ashraf, Pakistani politician and cricket administrator
- Nasim Fekrat, Afghan journalist
- Nasim-ul-Ghani (born 1941), Pakistani cricketer
- Nasim Hasan Shah (1929–2015), Pakistani judge
- Nasim Khaksar (born 1944), Iranian writer
- Nasim Khan (cricketer, born 1976) (born 1976), Pakistani cricketer
- Nasim Nisr (born 1968), Lebanese-Israeli convicted of spying
- Nasim Nuñez (born 2000), American baseball player
- Nasim Ur Rehman, Pakistani politician
- Nasim al-Safarjalani (1935–1994), Syrian politician
- Lieutenant General Abu Saleh Mohammad Nasim (born 1943), former Chief of Army Staff, Bangladesh Army
- Anwar Nasim (born 1935), Pakistani nuclear scientist and molecular biologist
- Daya Shankar Kaul Nasim (1811–1845), Urdu poet
- Mohammed Nasim (1948–2020), Bangladesh politician
- Mohammad Nasim (Guantanamo captive 958) (born 1962), Afghan detainee
- Mohammad Nasim Akhundzada (died 1990), Afghan warlord

==== Nasimuddin ====
- Nasimuddin Amin (1955–2008), Malaysian businessman

==== Nassim ====
- Nassim Ahmed (born 2000), Comorian footballer
- Nassim Akrour (born 1974), Algerian footballer
- Nassim Banouas (born 1986), Algerian-German footballer
- Nassim Ben Khalifa (born 1992), Tunisian-Swiss footballer
- Nassim Boukmacha (born 1987), Algerian footballer
- Nassim Dehouche (born 1982), Algerian footballer
- Nassim Hamlaoui (born 1981), Algerian footballer
- Nassim Maalouf (born 1941). Lebanese trumpeter
- Nassim Mendil (born 1979), Algerian-French footballer
- Nassim Nicholas Taleb (born 1960), Lebanese-American businessman and academic
- Nassim Oussalah (born 1981), Algerian footballer
- Nassim Soleimanpour (born 1981), writer from Iran (White Rabbit Red Rabbit)

==== Nesim ====
- Nesim Özgür (born 1973), Turkish-Bulgarian footballer
- Nesim Tahirović (1941–2020), Bosnian painter
- Nesim Turan (born 1992), Turkish Paralympian table tennis player

=== Women ===
==== Naseem ====
- Naseem Begum (1936–1971), Pakistani singer
- Naseem Banu (1916–2002), Indian cinema actress
- Naseem Hameed (born 1988), Pakistani athlete
- Naz Shah (born Naseem Shah, 1973), British Labour Party politician

==== Nasim ====
- Nasim Pedrad (born 1981), Iranian-American actress and comedian
- Nasim Wali Khan (1932–2021), Pakistani politician
- Nasim Zehra (born 1953), Pakistani journalist

=== Fictional characters ===
- Nacim Bismilla, fictional character on the HBO drama Oz, played by Ra Hanna
- Naseem Ali Khan, fictional character on the British drama Indian Summers, played by Tanmay Dhanania

== Place ==
- Al Naseem Sub-Municipality
- Al Naseem in Dammam by Diyar Al Muharraq

== Other uses ==
- Nasim (car), Iranian car
- Naseem (film), 1995 Hindi film
- Nassim al-Roh, 1998 Syrian film
- Naseem Cup, Yemeni football competition, 2000–2003
- NASSIM, an Off-Broadway play by Iranian playwright Nassim Soleimanpour
