= Najat =

Najat is an Arabic female given name meaning "savior" or "salvation". In some countries it can be spelled Nagat. People named Najat include:

- Najat Aatabou, Moroccan singer
- Najat Al Saghira, Egyptian singer and actress
- Najat El Hachmi, Catalan-Moroccan writer
- Najat El-Khairy, Canadian-Palestinian painter
- Najat Kaanache, Basque-Moroccan chef
- Najat Makki, Emirati painter
- Najat Vallaud-Belkacem, French politician
- Najat Idris, award winning creative copywriter
