= Ishtiaq =

Ishtiyāq (Arabic: اشتیاق), meaning "longing" or "craving", is a personal name mostly used as name used for a male child in the Muslim world, popularly used by Muslims in the Indian subcontinent. It is also spelled as Ishtyaq, Ishtiaqe and Ishtiaque. Notable people with the name include:

- Ishtiaq Ahmad, multiple people
- Ishtiaq Mubarak (1948–2013), Malaysian hurdler
- Ishtiaq Muhammad (born 1992), Hong Kong cricketer
- Farhat Ishtiaq (born 1980), Pakistani writer
