= Basri =

Basri (Arabic: بصري) is an Arabic masculine given name and a surname, as well as a last name found in the South Indian state called Karnataka in which they belong to the Hindu Kota Brahmin community.

In Karnataka, India, it is the name of a small village.

Basri may refer to:

== Given name ==
- Basri Dirimlili (1929–1997), Turkish footballer

== Surname ==
- Bachtiar Basri (1953–2025), Indonesian civil servant and politician, vice-governor of Lampung (2014–2019)
- Carole Basri, American filmmaker
- Driss Basri (1938–2007), Moroccan politician
- Fqih Basri (1927–2003), Moroccan regime opponent
- Gibor Basri, American astrophysicist
- Rabia Basri, female Muslim Sufi saint
