= Sabri Al-Ramahi =

Iraqi radio director (1948–2026)

- صبري الرماحي
- Born: Sabri Al Ramahi; 1 July 1948; Baghdad, Iraq
- Died: 25 July 2026 (aged 78)
- Occupations: Radio director, television director, documentary filmmaker
- Years active: 1970–2026

Sabri Al-Ramahi (Arabic: صبري الرماحي; 1 July 1948 – 25 July 2026) was an Iraqi radio director, television director and documentary filmmaker. He held a number of administrative positions in the General Establishment for Cinema and Theater and the Department of Cinema and Theater, and since 1996, he worked as the director of programs and documentaries for Al Jazeera Arabic.

== Life and career ==
Sabri Al-Ramahi was born in Baghdad, Kingdom of Iraq on 1 July 1948. He graduated in Institute of Fine Arts, University of Baghdad before continuing his higher education at the Academy of Fine Arts.

In 1967, he wrote his first radio script and began collaborating informally with local stations. In 1970, he was appointed a director in the Drama Department at the Voice of the Masses radio station, where he directed numerous radio series and programs. Among his most prominent works during this period were Al-Bahithun (The Searchers), Jurf Al-Milh (Salt Bank), and Qanadil Denshawai (Lanterns of Denshawai).

Al-Ramahi later turned to selecting film scores for television productions, before being appointed the head of the film music department at the General Organization for Cinema and Theater. He later expanded into soundtrack curation and audio direction for television and productions. He became the Head of the Soundtrack Department at the State Establishment for Cinema and Theater. He also collaborated with the National Acting Troupe. He subsequently took over the management of the National Theatre, and then served as Director of Advertising and Media at the Department of Cinema and Theatre during the tenure of Yousef Al Sayegh, until his retirement.

In 1996, he joined Al Jazeera Satellite Channel in Doha, beginning his work on 4 July 1996, as a director for programs and documentary films. He directed a large number of programs.

Al-Ramahi died on 25 July 2026, at the age of 78.
