= Talal =

Talal or Telal (Arabic: طلال, Ṭalāl) is an Arabic masculine given name and a surname.

The name's Proto-Semitic root is ṭ-l-l, meaning "dew".

People with the name include:

== Given name ==
- Talal of Jordan (1909–1972), Jordanian king
- Talal Aklan, Yemeni politician
- Talal Alkernawi (born 1954), Israeli Arab politician
- Talal Arslan (born 1955), Lebanese politician
- Talal Asad (born 1932), American anthropologist
- Talal Al-Bloushi (born 1986), Qatari football player
- Talal Abu-Ghazaleh (born 1938), Jordanian businessman
- Talal Khalfan (born 1980), Omani football player
- Talal Majrashi (born 1990), Saudi Arabian football player
- Talal Maddah (1940–2000), Saudi Arabian singer
- Talal Al-Nuaimi (born 1988), Emirati basketball player
- Talal Qureshi (born 1988), Pakistani musician
- Talal bin Abdullah Al Rashid (1823–1868), ruler of Hail
- Talal bin Abdulaziz Al Saud (1931–2018), Saudi royal
- Talal al-Sharif, Jordanian politician
- Talal Yassine, (born 1972), Lebanese Australian businessman
- Talal Yousef, (born 1975), Bahraini footballer

== Surname ==
- Chaïbia Talal (1929–2004), Moroccan painter
