= Ibro =

Ibro is a Bosnian diminutive of the Arabic name Ibrahim and may refer to: Somali nick name for Ibrahim.

== Given name ==
- Ibrahim "Ibro" Biogradlić (1931–2015), retired Bosnian footballer

== Other uses ==
- Ibro, Albania, village in Berat County, Albania
