= Heikal =

The Arabic word Haikal (Arabic: هيكل; also spelled Haykal), meaning temple, may refer to:

== People ==
- Muhammad Haykal (disambiguation)
  - Mohamed Hassanein Heikal (1923–2016), Egyptian political journalist, writer and editor
  - Mohammed Hussein Heikal (1888–1956), Egyptian writer, politician, lawyer and former Minister of Education
- Rodolphe Haykal (1969-present), Lebanese military officer, Commander of the Lebanese Armed Forces
- Yousef Haikal, a Palestinian-Jordanian Ambassador and a Mayor of Jaffa

== Symbols ==
- Baháʼí symbols#Five-pointed star used as the official symbol of the Bahá'í Faith
