= Qasymbek =

- Pronunciation: Arabic: [qa'sɪm bəy] Persian: [ɢæʼsem beck]
- Gender: Masculine

Origin
- Origin: Turkic

Qasymbek or Kasymbek, also written as Kassymbek (Kazakh: Қасымбек, Kyrgyz: Касымбек) is a Turkic masculine given name which is common in Kyrgyzstan and Kazakhstan. It is related to the Azerbaijani name Qasım bəy. The name derives from Arabic as Qasim (Arabic: قاسم,قسیم), meaning dividing or distributing and Bek which is a Turkic title for tribal chief, making the name's literal meaning as a "dividing ruler".

== Given name ==
- Kasymbek Yeshmambetov (1910–1984), Kyrgyz writer
- Gasim bey Zakir (1784–1857), Azerbaijani poet
- Gasim bey Hajibababeyov (1811–1874), Azerbaijani architect

== Surname ==
- Zhenis Kassymbek (born 1975), Kazakh politician

== See also ==
- Qasim (name)
- Bey
