= Sumaya Ali Raja =

Yemeni journalist and political activist

Sumaya Ali Raja (born c.1954) is a Yemeni journalist and political activist. In December 2005 she became the first woman to announce herself as a candidate for the Presidency of Yemen.

== Life ==
Ali Raja grew up in Taiz, in a family of seven children. Her father encouraged her and her three sisters to break with taboos and appear in public unveiled. After some education in Yemen, she followed her sisters aged 14 to study at a North Carolina high school, and on to study political science at Southwest Missouri State and broadcast journalism at the University of Kansas. In the late 1970s she and her sister Jamila were among the first female TV newscasters in Yemen.

She later lived in England, doing consultancy work for the BBC and Channel 4. She married and brought up two children in Paris. After the September 11 attacks she created and ran the Yemen-French Forum to help explain Yemen to French policy-makers. Following her divorce, she returned to live in Yemen.

Ali Raja announced her candidacy at an Arab women's conference, 'From Words to Actions', held in Sana'a in December 2005. She was later joined by Rashida al-Qaili who was a satirical journalist who also stood for president.

In January 2007 she announced her intention to established a liberal political party, Al Bushra Party, "to achieve equality between men and women, preserve heritage, and enhance the rights of children".
