= Khalfan =

Khalfan is a given name. Notable people with the name include:

- Khalfan Ibrahim (born 1988), Qatar footballer
- Khalfan Khamis Mohamed (born 1974), Tanzanian national, one of numerous al-Qaeda suspects
- Mohammed Khalfan Bin Kharbash, former minister of finance and industry of the United Arab Emirates
- Salim Abdallah Khalfan, Member of Parliament in the National Assembly of Tanzania
- Talal Khalfan (born 1980), Omani footballer
