= Moatassem =

Moatassem (also spelled Moatasem, Moatassam, Mutassim and Motasim; Arabic: معتصم) is a masculine Arabic given name, it may refer to:

- A spelling variant of Mutassim Gaddafi (1977–2011), Libyan Army officer
