= Abiha =

Abiha or Abeeha
- Gender: Female
- Language: Arabic

Origin
- Meaning: her father

Other names
- See also: Fatima az-Zahra

Abiha Noor or Abeeha (Arabic: ابیھا), is an Arabic feminine given name. Its meaning is "her father" which was given to Fatima az-Zahra by the Islamic prophet Muhammad as "Umm Abiha".

== Notable people with the name ==
- Abiha Haider (b. 1996), Pakistani footballer
