= Najat Kaanache =

- Born: 1987 (age 38–39); Orio
- Citizenship: Spain, Morocco
- Occupations: Chef, Actor

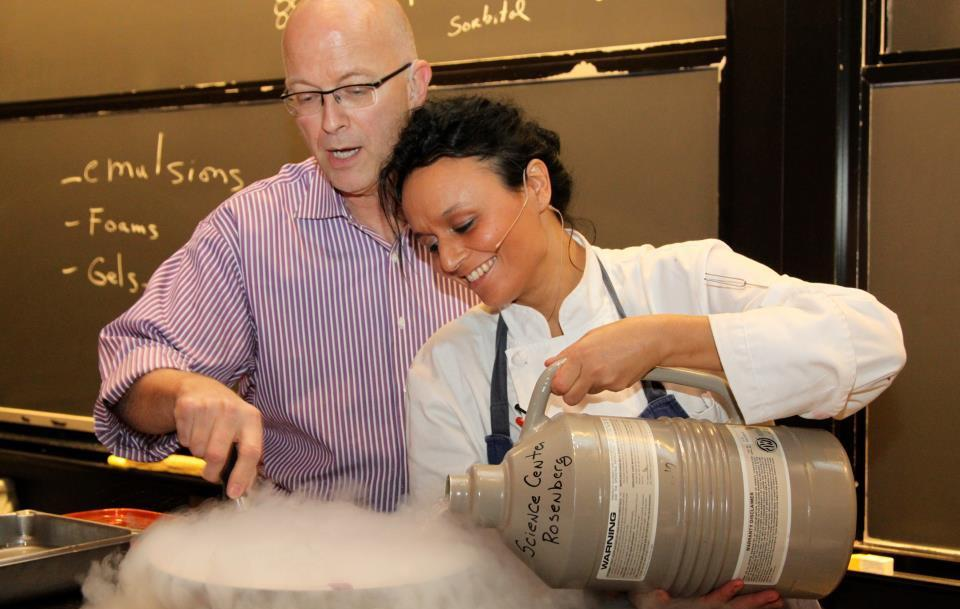
Chef Najat Kaanache with White House Executive Pastry Chef Bill Yosses lecturing at Harvard University

Najat Kaanache (born 28 November 1980) is the host of AMC Networks' cooking series "Cocina Marroquí" which airs on Canal Cocina in Spain and El Gourmet throughout 20 countries in Latin America.

== Background ==
Kaanache was born and raised in San Sebastián of Spain's Basque Country. She gained fame as a lead actress on Spanish daytime television series and then traveled throughout the Middle East and South America working in philanthropy to empower women and street kids. She later attended culinary school and gained fame as "The Pilgrim Chef" by blogging throughout her four years training with the world's top chefs: Ferran Adrià, René Redzepi, Thomas Keller, Grant Achatz, Heston Blumenthal and Martín Berasategui.

After spending two years working as an apprentice in the kitchens at Chicago's Alinea, Napa's The French Laundry, New York's Per Se (restaurant), and Copenhagen's Noma Kaanache went on to achieve the auspicious Executive and Creative Haute Cuisine Certification after completing her apprenticeship during the final two seasons at Spain's El Bulli. Ferran Adrià stated to the Maghreb Arabe Presse that "Najat Kaanache represents the soul of Morocco through the language of the kitchen. Her passion for creativity and innovation should be a reference for the country." After El Bulli's historic closure, Kaanache traveled extensively to instruct chefs across the globe in the latest gastronomic techniques and taught and lectured alongside White House Executive Pastry Chef, Bill Yosses on the science of cooking at Harvard University (pictured), New York University and at the 2013 World Science Festival in NYC (pictured) and 2013 Beijing Science Festival in China.

She was the opening chef partner of Souk Restaurant in Dallas, TX. She was the opening chef partner of Piripi Restaurant in the Village of Merrick Park in Coral Gables, FL; She is the chef and owner of Nur Restaurant, in the Medina of Fez, Morocco.
