= Bagher Najafi =

Iranian Studies scholar

Seyyed Mohammad Bagher Najafi Shoushtari (January 1948 – July 2002) was a prominent Iranian scholar of Iranian Studies, in particular Iranian art and culture, and Islamic Studies. He is the author of many scholarly books and articles.

Najafi had a stated bias toward Shiaism.

== Bibliography ==
Bagher Najafi is the author of over forty books and hundreds of articles on Iranian and Islamic studies, including:

Year	Persian Title	English Title	Ref.
1970	Idiuluzhi-yi Illahi va pishtazan-i tamaddun		
1971	Jahan bini-yi insani		
1972	Suz-i Musalmani		
1972	Islam, Marksism?		
1976	Shahanshahi va dindari		
1976	Tafakkur-i mazhabi		
1979	Bahaiyan		
1983	Khuzistan dar manabi-i Iranshinasi: kulliyat		
1985	Madinahshinasi	Medinalogy	
1987	Dinnamahhayi Iran: Kitabshinasi-I Mawzui-I Kitabha-Yi Dini-I Iran	Iranian religious books: Bibliography of religious books of Iran	
1989	Asar-i Iran dar Misr	Iranian Art Treasures in Egypt	
1995	Madinahshinasi II	Medinalogy II	
1997	Shahnamehaye Iran	The Shahnamehs of Iran	
2002	Khuzistan dar matnha-yi kuhan		
2003	Moshaf-e Iran	The Mushaf of Iran	
