= Wissem =

Wissem is a unisex Arabic given name. Notable people with the name include:

- Wissem Hmam (born 1981), Tunisian handball player
- Wissem Hosni (born 1985), Tunisian long-distance runner
- Wissem Ben Yahia (born 1984), Tunisian footballer
