= Carole Basri =

American film director

Carole Basri is an American filmmaker and lawyer of Iraqi Jewish descent. Most of her productions focus on the History of the Jews in Iraq as she documents her ancestral roots and discusses Jewish traditions in Iraq.

== Work ==
- The Last Jews Of Bagdad; End Of An Exile Beginning Of A Journey
- Searching for Baghdad: A Daughter’s Journey
