= Kadeem =

Kadeem is a given name. Notable people with the name include:

- Kadeem Allen (born 1993), American basketball player for Hapoel Haifa in the Israeli Basketball Premier League
- Kadeem Hardison, American actor
- Kadeem Harris, English footballer
- Kadeem Roberts, American politician from Connecticut
- Kadeem Telfort (born 1998), American football player

== See also ==
- Bilad Al Qadeem, town in Bahrain
