= Ruhullah =

Ruhullah, also spelled Rouhollah, Ruhollah or Rohullah and in other ways (Arabic: روح ‌الله or روح الله or روح‌الله), is a male Arabic/persian given name composed of the elements Ruh and Allah. It means spirit of God. This name is mostly used in Iran. It may refer to:

== Given name ==
- Ruhulla Akhundov (1897–1938), Azerbaijani politician
- Rohullah (Bagram detainee) (born c. 1967), Afghan Bagram detainee
- Rouhollah Arab (born 1984), Iranian football player
- Rouhollah Askari (born 1982), Iranian sprinter
- Rouhollah Ataei (born 1983), Iranian football player
- Ruhallah Baba’i Saleh, Iranian politician
- Ruhollah Bigdeli (born 1984), Iranian football player
- Rouhollah Dadashi (1982–2011), Iranian powerlifter, bodybuilder and strongman
- Ruhollah Hosseinian (1956–2020), Iranian politician
- Ruhollah Khaleqi (1906–1965), Iranian musician, composer, conductor and author
- Ruhollah Khatami (1906–1988), Iranian Shia cleric
- Ruhollah Khomeini (1900–1989), Iranian religious leader and politician, leader of the Islamic Revolution
- Ruhallah Abbaspour, Iranian politician
- Ruhallah Hazratpour Talahieh, Iranian politician
- Ruhallah Izadkhahzadeh, Iranian politician
- Ruhallah Motfikar Azad, Iranian politician
- Ruhullah Mehdi, Indian politician
- Ruhallah Najabat, Iranian politician
- Ruhallah Sadr al-Sadati (born 1983), Iranian Shia cleric
- Rohullah Nikpai (born 1987), Afghan taekwondo practitioner
- Rouhollah Samieinia (born 1979), Iranian football player
- Rouhollah Seifollahi (born 1991), Iranian football player
- Ruhollah Zam (1978–2020), Iranian journalist

== Surname ==
- Sahib Rohullah Wakil (born 1962), Afghan held in Guantanamo Bay detention camp
