= Rashida al-Qaili =

Yemeni journalist

- رشيدة القيلي
- Born: 1965 (age 60–61)
- Occupations: Journalist, activist

Rashida al-Qaili (Arabic: رشيدة القيلي) is a Yemeni journalist and activist who first became internationally known due to her campaign for President of Yemen in 2006 with an anti-corruption focus. She has since become an anti-Houthi activist.

== Biography ==
She was born in 1965. She began her career in journalism by editing the women's section on Al Joumhouria from 1984 to 1986 before founding the women's section in Al Sahwa, where she remained until 1993. She also contributed to other newspapers, including Al-Mithaq, the official newspaper of the ruling party of Yemen at the time and Yemen's president Ali Abdullah Saleh.

She ran for President of Yemen in 2006, focusing on freedom and stopping corruption. She was the second woman to stand after Sumaya Ali Raja. Her campaign was not taken seriously, and success was seen as unlikely, but it gained attention because of Yemen's culture. She did not receive the backing of the Yemeni House of Representatives. Afterwards, she called for the execution of the incumbent president, Ali Abdullah Saleh. In response, a journalist called her a "prostitute". She responded by alleging the government "seeks to silence female opposition figures by attacking their honor".

She has since become an anti-Houthi activist and served as head of the Fudul Alliance for Rights and Freedoms, where she called for people to take up arms to "protect their religion and their lives" from the Houthis, who she has alleged have committed crimes against humanity.

She has become known as the "Mother of Orphans", as after the Siege of Dammaj she has sponsored a number of orphans from Dammaj.

== Personal life ==
She had a son, Ashraf Abdulrahman, who fought against the Houthis. He was killed by them in 2016 in the Marib Governorate. She also has another son, Laden.
