= Ashraqat =

Female given name

Ashraqat is an Arabic feminine name meaning "dawned." It came into use in Egypt as a popular name for newborn girls because of a character on Bawabat Al-Halawani, an Egyptian soap opera that aired in the late 1990s. Previously, it was almost never used as a name.
