= Hatem =

Hatem (Arabic: حاتم) is a masculine Arabic given name and surname. Notable people with the name include:

== Given name ==
- Hatem Ali (1962–2020), Syrian actor
- Hatem Aqel (born 1978), Jordanian footballer
- Hatem Ben Arfa (born 1987), French football player of Tunisian descent
- Hatem Abd Elhamed (born 1991), Israeli footballer
- Hatem Ali Jamadar (1872–1982), Bengali politician
- Hatem Kamil (died 2004), deputy governor of Iraq's Baghdad Governorate
- Hatem El Mekki (1918–2003), Tunisian painter
- Hatem Mersal (born 1975), Egyptian long jumper
- Hatem Mohamed (born 2001), Egyptian professional footballer
- Hatem Ben Salem (born 1956), Tunisian politician
- Hatem Trabelsi (born 1977), Tunisian footballer
- Hatem Yassen (born 1986) Egyptian snooker player

== Surname ==
- Abdulaziz Hatem (born 1990), Qatari footballer
- Ahmed Hatem (basketball) (born 1995), Egyptian basketball player
- Ahmed Hatem (born 1987), Egyptian actor
- Euclydes Hatem (1914–1984), Brazilian catch wrestler
- Jad Hatem (born 1952), Lebanese poet
- Olivier Hatem (born 1973), French Paralympic archer
- Robert Hatem (born 1956), Lebanese bodyguard and security official
- Shafick George Hatem (Ma Haide) (1910–1988), Lebanese-American doctor
- Thomas J. Hatem (1925–1985), American politician

== See also ==
- Mauritanian Party of Union and Change, abbreviated as "HATEM"
