= Fasih =

- Pronunciation: Persian: [ˈfasˤiːħ]
- Gender: Male

Origin
- Origin: Persian
- Meaning: Eloquent, literary, wide
- Region of origin: Middle East

Fasih (Persian: فصیح, romanized: Faṣīḥ) or Fasihuddin (Persian: فصیح‌الدین, romanized: Faṣīḥuddīn) is a Persian male name meaning eloquent or literary.

== Given name ==
=== Fasih ===
- Admiral Fasih Bokhari (1942–2020), four-star admiral, Chief of Naval Staff (Pakistan) and ex-Chairman of the National Accountability Bureau
- Fasih Bari Khan, Pakistani television scriptwriter

=== Fasihuddin ===
- Syed Fasihuddin Soharwardy (born 1957), Pakistani Urdu nasheed singer or Naat Khawan
- Syed Fasihuddin (born 1938), Pakistani cricketer
- Fasihuddin Fitrat, Afghan military leader
