= Soha =

Soha سوہا
- Location within Pakistan
- Coordinates: 34.8°N 72.58°E
- Country: Pakistan
- Province: Khyber Pakhtunkhwa
- District: Haripur District
- Elevation: 495 m (1,624 ft)
- Time zone: UTC+5 (PST)

Soha (Urdu: سوہا) is a village of Haripur District in the Khyber Pakhtunkhwa province of Pakistan. It is part of Beer Union Council and is located at 34°8'0N 72°58'0E with an altitude of 495 metres (1627 feet).
