= I Have a Bee =

Worldwide hobby beekeeper organization

"I Have a Bee" foundation
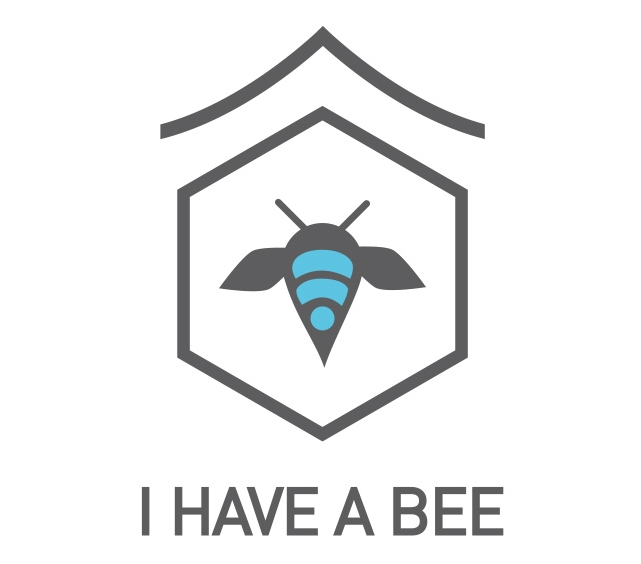
- Founded: 2014; 12 years ago
- Founders: Petar Petrov, Stefan Zlatev, Trifon Mihaylov
- Headquarters: Bulgaria
- Area served: Worldwide
- Website: www.ihaveabee.com

I Have a Bee (IHAB) is a worldwide organization established for hobby beekeepers. The organization hopes to deliver sustainable and long-term solutions to the pollinator decline through the hobby of beekeeping.

Founded by Petar Petrov, Stefan Zlatev and Trifon Michailov 2014 in Bulgaria. The group has examined the roots of traditional beekeeping and found that individual farms tended to keep only a few hives each—in contrast with today's commercial beekeeping model, in which a single apiary consists of hundreds of hives. The founders believe that this practice is the cause of the pollinator decline. The IHAB was created to imitate the old beekeeping model and allow a more even distribution of bees.

== History ==
In 2013, IHAB introduced their first development of a top bar hive. The product was designed to make it easier and more convenient for an average person to raise bees. The top bar hive has the convenience of being usable in backyards or on city terraces.

In 2015, IHAB, Norwegian urban beekeeping group ByBi, and New York City Beekeepers Association set up the first intercontinental hobby beekeepers' network.
