= Nasim Ur Rehman =

Haji Nasim Ur Rehman is an industrialist and politician from Mardan district, Khyber Pakhtunkhwa, Pakistan. He is a member of the Awami National Party. In the 1997 general election for the National Assembly, he was elected as Member of Parliament (MP) for NA-6 Mardan-I constituency. He is the director of the Saleem Group of Industries and holds a membership in the Federation of Pakistan Chambers of Commerce & Industry.

Rehman ran in the February 18, 2008 general election for the seat from NA-11 Mardan 3 constituency, his first attempt to be elected from a constituency outside his home constituency of NA-6 Mardan 1. He lost to Abdul Akbar Khan of the Pakistan People's Party.

== See also ==
- Awami National Party
- Mardan

== Notes and references ==
- http://www.jang.com.pk/thenews/feb2005-daily/11-02-2005/metro/i2.htm
- http://www.fpcci.com.pk/life.asp
