= Mua'dh =

Mua'dh or Moath or Muaz is a male Arabic given name. Notable people with the name include:

- Muadh ibn Jabal (603–639), companion of Muhammad
- Sa'd ibn Mu'adh (c. 590–627), companion of Muhammad
