= Sidqi =

- Pronunciation: Arabic: [sˤɪdqiː] Egyptian Arabic: [ˈsˤedʔi]
- Gender: Male

Origin
- Origin: Arabic
- Meaning: truthful, sincere

Other names
- Alternative spelling: Sidki, Sedki, Sidky, Sedqi, Setki,
- Related names: Siddiq

Sidqi (Arabic: صدقي, Sidqī; also spelled Sedki, Sedqi, Sıdkı, or Sıtkı) The dotless i appears in Turkish spellings.

== Given name ==
- Sitki Akçatepe (1902–1985), Turkish actor
- Sıtkı Ferdi İmdat (born 2001), Turkish football player
- Sıtkı Güvenç (1961–2023), Turkish politician
- Sedki Sobhi, Egyptian politician
- Sıtkı Üke (1876– 1941), Turkish military officer and politician
- Sıtkı Yırcalı (1908–1988), Turkish lawyer and politician
- Sıtkı Uğur Ziyal (born 1944), Turkish diplomat

== Middle name ==
- Cahit Sıtkı Tarancı (1910–1956), Turkish poet and author
- Jamil Sidqi al-Zahawi, Iraqi poet and philosopher
- Muhammad Sidqi Mahmud, Egyptian Air Force commanding general

== Surname ==
- Atef Sedki, Egyptian politician
- Aziz Sedki, Egyptian politician
- Bakr Sidqi, Iraqi nationalist and general
- Hala Sedki, Egyptian actress
- Hamada Sedki, Egyptian football coach
- Isma'il Sidqi, Egyptian politician
- Muhammad Najati Sidqi, Palestinian politician
- Şahap Sıtkı, Turkish writer
