= Abu Hafs =

Abu Hafs may refer to:

- Abu Hafs Umar al-Nasafi, a Muslim scholar of 11th/12th century
- Mohammed Atef (Abu Hafs al-Masri), past military chief of al-Qaeda
- Umar I of Crete (Abu Hafs Umar al-Iqritishi), early ninth-century Andalusian pirate and founder of the Emirate of Crete
- Abu Hafs ibn Amr (died ca. 928/931), last Arab emir of Malatya
- Abu Hafs al-Urduni, Jordanian mujahid who fought in Chechnya
- Mahfouz Ould al-Walid (Abu Hafs al-Mauritani), Islamic religious scholar associated with the Taliban and al-Qaeda. He opposed the September 11 attacks and has since distanced himself from al-Qaeda
- Abu Hafs al-Hashimi al-Qurashi, a militant and the fifth and current caliph of the Islamic State.
