= Rizqallah =

Rizqallah or Rezkalla (Arabic: رزق الله) is a male Arabic Christian given name and surname, meaning livelihood from God.

== Males ==
- Rizqallâh Cheikhô, original name of Louis Cheikhô (1859–1927), Iraqi orientalist and Christian theologian
- René Rizqallah Khawam, known as René R. Khawam (1917–2004), Syrian Christian Arabic-French translator
- Antoine Rizkallah Kanaan Filho, known as Tony Kanaan (born 1974), Brazilian race car driver of Lebanese heritage
