= Abu Nasr (Iran) =

Abu Nasr ابونصر
- Village
- Location within Iran
- Coordinates: 30°04′47″N 53°36′51″E
- Country: Iran
- Province: Fars
- County: Bavanat
- Bakhsh: Sarchehan
- Rural District: Sarchehan

Population (2006)
  - Total: 155
- Time zone: UTC+3:30 (IRST)
  - Summer (DST): UTC+4:30 (IRDT)

Abu Nasr (Persian: ابونصر, also Romanized as Abū Naşr) is a village in Sarchehan Rural District, Sarchehan District, Bavanat County, Fars province, Iran. At the 2006 census, its population was 155, in 36 families.
