= Aman Ali =

Aman Ali (Arabic: أمان علي) is a male Muslim given name formed from the elements aman and Ali. It thus means "security, safety; peace; shelter, protection. It is the name of:

- Aman Ali Khan (1888–1953), Indian singer and composer
- Amaan Ali Khan (born 1977), Indian musician
- Aman Ali (comedian) (born 1985), American comedian
- Aman Ali (cricketer) (born 1989), Emirati cricketer
