= Sakhra (disambiguation) =

Sakhra or Sakhrah
- Gender: feminine

Origin
- Origin: Arabic, Muslim-majority countries
- Meaning: "peace", "safety"

Sakhra is a name for the Foundation Stone, the rock at the center of the Dome of the Rock in Jerusalem.

Sakhra or Sakhrah is also a feminine given name which is used in the Arab world and in Muslim majority countries.

Sakhra may also refer to:

- La Sakhra, stage name of Belgian singer Petra Maria De Steur (born 1972)
- Sakhra, Swat, administrative unit in Khyber Pakhtunkhwa province, Pakistan

== See also ==
- Bazer Sakhra, town and commune in Sétif Province, Algeria
