= Tarazi =

Tarazi or Al-Tarazi may refer to:

- Tarazi, Iran, a village in Ardabil Province
- Tarazi (surname), a surname and list of notable people or characters with the name
