= Rajaei =

Rajaei (also spelled Rajaee, Rajai, or Recai (Turkish), Persian: رجايی) is a given name and surname, it may refer to:

== Given name ==
- Cingöz Recai, Turkish fictional character
- Recai Kutan (1930–2024), Turkish politician
- Rajai Davis (born 1980), American baseball player
- Rajai Muasher (born 1944), Jordanian politician and former deputy prime minister

== Surname ==
- Alireza Rajaei (born 1962), Iranian journalist
- Mohammad-Ali Rajai (1933–1981), Iranian politician and President of Iran
- Ateghe Sediqi (born 1943), born Pouran Rajai, Iranian politician and human rights activist, widow of the above

== See also ==
- Shahid Rajai (disambiguation)
- Razai, a quilt of India, Pakistan and Afghanistan
