= Ramiz =

Name list

Ramiz, Rameez or Rhomeez / (Arabic: رامز) is an Arabic masculine given name meaning "one who communicates well", "wise", "noble", or "intelligent".

== Notable people ==
- Ramiz Alia (1925–2011), former President of Albania
- Ramiz Brahimaj (born 1992), MMA fighter
- Ramiz Delalić (1963–2007), Bosnian fighter
- Ramez Galal (born 1973), Egyptian prankster, actor, and singer
- Ramiz Jaraisy (born 1951), Arab-Israeli politician
- Ramiz Kerimov (born 1981), Azerbaijani footballer
- Ramiz Mammadov (born 1968), Azerbaijani footballer
- Ramiz Mamedov (born 1972), Azerbaijani-Russian footballer
- Rameez Raja (born 1962), Pakistani cricketer and commentator
- Ramiz Tafilaj (born 1949), Albanian-American businessman

== See also ==
- Ramziddin Sayidov (born 1982), Uzbekistani judoka
- Ramez Wakel el-Gaw, Egyptian pranking television program
