= Hafeez =

- Pronunciation: Arabic: [ˈħafiːðˤ]
- Gender: Male
- Language: Arabic, Urdu, Persian

Origin
- Origin: Arabic
- Meaning: Guardian
- Region of origin: Arabia

Other names
- Alternative spelling: Hafiz, Hafiez, Hafidh, Hafeedh, Hefiz

Hafeez, meaning "protector" in Arabic ( حفیظ ) is a masculine Muslim name. Notable people with the name include:

== Given name ==
- Hafeez Jullundhri, Pakistani poet
- Hafeez Malik, Professor of Political Science at Villanova University, Pennsylvania

== Surname ==
- Azeem Hafeez, Pakistani cricketer
- Mohammad Hafeez, Pakistani cricketer
- Muin Bek Hafeez, Indian basketball player
- Osman Abdel Hafeez, Egyptian Olympic fencer

== See also ==
- Hafiz (disambiguation)
