= Atikah =

Atiqah or Atikah
- Pronunciation: a-tee-ka, a-tee-qah
- Gender: feminine

Origin
- Origin: Arabic, Muslim-majority countries
- Meaning: beautiful, charitable, loving

Other names
- Related names: Atif, Atik, Atiq, Atir, Atia, Atifa, Atifah, Atifat, Atika, Ateka, Atikah, Atiqa, Atira, Atirah, Atiya, Atiyah

Atiqah or Atikah (Arabic: عاتكة) is a feminine given name which is used in the Arab world and in Muslim majority countries.

Atiqah may refer to:

== People ==
- Atikah bint Yazid, Muhammad's great-grandmother
- Atikah bint Murrah, great-great grandmother of Muhammad
- Atika bint Abdul Muttalib, aunt of Muhammad
- Atiqa bint Zayd ibn Amr ibn Nufayl (former wife of Abdullah ibn Abu Bakr married 'Umar in the year 12 Anno hegiræ and after 'Umar was murdered, she married az-Zubayr ibn al-Awwam
