= Wajdi =

Wajdi, Wagdi, Wagdy, Vezhdi, or Vecdi is a masculine given name and surname of Arabic origin. Notable people with the name include:

== Given name ==
=== Vecdi ===
- Vecdi Gönül (born 1939), Turkish politician

=== Vezhdi ===
- Vezhdi Rashidov (1951–2026), Bulgarian sculptor and politician

=== Wagdy ===
- Wagdy Abd el-Hamied Mohamed Ghoneim (born 1951), Egyptian imam and writer

=== Wajdi ===
- Wajdi al-Ahdal (born 1973), Yemeni writer
- Wajdi Bouallègue (born 1982), Tunisian gymnast
- Wajdi Bouazzi (born 1985), Tunisian football player
- Wajdi Boukhili (born 1998), Tunisian athlete
- Wajdi Dawo (born 1988), Libyan basketball player
- Wajdi Essid (born 1960), Tunisian football manager
- Wajdi Kechrida (born 1995), French-Tunisian footballer
- Wajdi Mallat (1919–2010), Lebanese jurist, statesman, and author
- Wajdi Mejri (born 1989), Tunisian footballer
- Wajdi Mouawad (born 1968), Canadian writer, actor, and director
- Wajdi Nabhan (born 2001), Palestinian footballer
- Wajdi Sahli (born 1997), French-Tunisian footballer
- Wajdi Sarhan, Arab-Israeli Army officer and politician
- Wajdi Sinen (born 1990), Tunisian-Qatari handball player

== Surname ==
=== Wagdi ===
- Anwar Wagdi (1904–1955), Egyptian actor, writer, and director

=== Wagdy ===
- Mahmoud Wagdy (born 1948), Egyptian politician
- Sherine Wagdy (born 1969), Egyptian singer

=== Wajdi ===
- Farid Wajdi, Indonesian lawyer
- Mubarak Wajdi (born 1991), Saudi footballer

== See also ==
- Wagdi language, one of the Bhil languages of India spoken mainly in Dungarpur and Banswara districts of Southern Rajasthan. Wagdi has been characterized as a dialect of Bhili.
