= Mamdouh =

- Pronunciation: Arabic: [mamduːħ]
- Gender: boy

Origin
- Origin: Arabic
- Meaning: "One who is commended", "praised", "glorified"

Other names
- Alternative spelling: Mamduh, Memduh, Memdouh

Mamdouh (also spelled Mamduh or Memduh, Arabic: ممدوح) is a masculine given name and also, a surname. People with the name include:

== Given name ==
- Mamdouh Abbas, Egyptian businessman, twice Zamalek chairman
- Mamdouh Al Aker (born 1943), Palestinian physician and politician
- Mamdouh Bahri (born 1957), jazz guitarist who has combined Afro-Mediterranean music with a jazz tradition
- Mamdouh Habib, Egyptian born Australian Muslim detained in the Guantanamo Bay detainment camps
- Mamdouh Ismail, Egyptian defence attorney and a former member of "the Jihad group"
- Mamdouh Hosny Khalil (born 1964), Egyptian politician
- Mamdouh Kashlan (born 1929), Syrian painter
- Mamdouh Mahmud Salim (born 1958), alleged co-founder of the Islamist terrorist network al-Qaeda
- Mamdouh Marei (1938–2018), Egyptian jurist and politician
- Mamdouh Saidam (1940–1971), Palestinian Fatah member
- Mamdouh Salem (1918–1988), Prime Minister of Egypt from 1975 to 1978
- Mamdouh bin Abdulaziz Al Saud (1940–2023), Saudi royal
- Memduh Ün (1920–2015), Turkish film producer and director

== Surname ==
- Alia Mamdouh (born 1944), Iraqi novelist, author and journalist living in exile in Paris, France

== See also ==
- Mamdouh Ibrahim Ahmed Habib v. George Bush (Civil Action No. 02-CV-1130), writ of habeas corpus filed on behalf of Guantanamo detainee
