= Yousef Al Sayegh =

Iraqi poet, novelist, and playwright

- Born: 1933
- Died: December 12, 2005 (aged 71–72)
- Occupations: poet, novelist, and playwright

Yousef Al Sayegh (Arabic: يوسف الصائغ) (2005–1933) was an Iraqi poet, novelist, and playwright.

== Career ==
Yousef was born in Mosul into a Christian family. In 1955, He graduated from the Department of Arabic Language at Dar Al-Mu’alimeen Al- ‘aliya (The Higher Teachers' House) with a master’s degree. He worked as a teacher for around 25 years. Then, he was appointed as Director-General of the Film and Theatre Department. He also worked in journalism for a long time. After the 1963 revolution, the Ba'ath Party imprisoned him for his political activities. He remained in prison until the early seventies. Then, he worked as a journalist. He wrote several poetry collections and a play. He was a member of The Writers’ Union, Artists Association, the Journalists Syndicate, the Higher Committee of Al-Mirbad Festival, and the Babylon Festival. He immigrated from Iraq to Syria and converted to Islam. He died in Damascus on December 12, 2005.

== Poetry Works ==
- Qasaid Gair Saliha LilNashr (Poems Not Valid for Publication) (1957).
- I’tirafat Malik Bin Al-Rayb (Malik Bin Al-Rayb's Confessions) (1978).
- Saiyidat Al-Tuffahat Al-Arba’ (Four Apples Lady) (1976).
- I’tirafat (Confessions) (1978).
- Al-Mu’allim (The Teacher) (1985).
- Qasa’id Yosof Al-Sayegh (Yosof Al-Sayegh's Poems) (1993).
- His master's dissertation on free verse poetry in Iraq.

== Novels ==
- Al-Lu’ba (The Game) (1972).
- Al-Masafa (The Distance) (1974).

== Plays ==
- Al-Bab (The Door) (1986).
- Al-Awdah (The Return) (1987).
- Dizaymona (1989).
