= Nermin Bezmen =

Turkish novelist (born 1954)

- Born: 30 April 1954 (age 72); Antalya, Turkey
- Occupation: Novelist
- Spouse(s): Pamir Bezmen (m. 1975; died 2009) Tolga Savacı (m. 2015)
- Children: 2

Nermin Bezmen (born 30 April 1954) is a Turkish novelist.

== Biography ==
Bezmen was born in Antalya in 1954. She attended Macka Primary School. While studying at Atatürk Girls' High School, she went to the United States with AFS scholarship in her senior year. She attended Sultanahmet School of Management on her return and graduated in 1974. In January 1975, she married Pamir Bezmen, a 39-year-old businessman at the age of 21. They had two children. He died on 29 January 2009. In 2015, she married actor Tolga Savacı and settled in New Jersey, USA.

Bezmen conducted television presentation, magazine authorship and public relations activities; She is interested in traditional Turkish arts. She taught painting lessons to adults and children in her own workshop.

She started writing novels in 1991. She researched the story of Kurt Seyt, who was her maternal grandfather, and turned it into a novel. Apart from that, she wrote many popular books in popular literature.

== Bibliography ==
- Kurt Seyt & Shura, 1992, Yay Ofset, İstanbul, (Yeni basımı PMR Yayınları).
- Kurt Seyt & Murka, 1994, Yay Ofset, İstanbul, (Yeni basımı PMR Yayınları).
- Sır, 2006, İstanbul, Remzi Kitabevi.
- Aurora'nın İncileri, 2007, İstanbul, Remzi Kitabevi.
- Sırça Tuzak, 2007, İstanbul, Remzi Kitabevi.
- Mengene Göçmenleri, 1996, İstanbul, PMR Yayınları.
- Zihnimin Kanatları, 1995, İstanbul, PMR Yayınları.
- Bizim Gizli Bahçemizden, 2009, İstanbul, Doğan Kitapçılık.
- Kırk Kırık Küp (Hikâye), 1999, İstanbul, PMR Yayınları.
- Bir Gece Yolculuğu, 1999, İstanbul, PMR Yayınları,
- Bir Duayen'in Hatıratı: Fuad Bezmen, 2002, (Nermin Bezmen) PMR Yayınları; Anılar (Hatırat); İstanbul, PMR Yayınları.
- Turkuaz'a Dönüş Bilge Nadir-Nevzat'ın Anılarından Asil Nadir Gerçeği, (Nermin Bezmen, Tercüme: Pamir Bezmen), 1997, İstanbul, PMR Yayınları.
- Dedem Kurt Seyit ve Ben, 2014, Destek Yayınları
- Gönderilmeyen Aşk, 2010, Doğan Kitapçılık
