= Ishtiaq Ahmad =

Ishtiaq Ahmad or Ishtiaq Ahmed is the name of:

- Ishtiaq Ahmad (fiction writer) (1944–2015), Pakistani fiction writer
- Ishtiaq Ahmed (political scientist) (born 1947), Swedish political scientist
- Ishtiaq Ahmed (field hockey) (born 1962), Pakistani field hockey player
- Jagdeep (born Jagdeep Syed Ishtiaq Ahmed Jaffry, 1939–2020), Indian film actor
- Ishtiaq Ahmed (cricketer) (born 1977), Bangladeshi umpire and former cricketer
