= Fikri =

Fikri (Arabic: فِكْرِي fik·riy, fik·rī, fik·ry) also spelled Fekri, is a masculine given Arabic name or surname in the possessive form, which generally means "thoughtful" but also could bear the meaning "intellectually, mentally, spiritual". It may refer to:

== Given name ==
=== Fakri ===
- Ahmad Fakri Saarani (born 1989), Malaysian footballer

=== Fekri ===
- Fekri Al-Hubaishi, Yemeni footballer

=== Fekry ===
- Fekry Pasha Abaza (1896–1979), Egyptian journalist and political activist
- Fekry Al-Naqqash (1945–2016), Egyptian writer and theater critic

=== Fikri ===
- Ahmet Fikri Tüzer (1878–1942), Turkish politician
- Bekir Fikri (1882–1914), Ottoman officer and revolutionary
- Fikri El Haj Ali (born 1985), German footballer
- Fikri Elma (1934–1999), Turkish footballer
- Fikri Işık (born 1965), Turkish educator, politician and government minister
- Fikri Karadağ, retired Turkish army general
- Fikri Sağlar (born 1953), Turkish politician and government minister

== Surname ==
=== Fekri ===
- Hossein Fekri, Iranian footballer
- Mahmoud Fekri, Iranian footballer
- Sara Khoshjamal Fekri, Iranian taekwondoka

=== Fekry ===
- Amany Fekry, Egyptian physical chemist

=== Fikri ===
- Mohd Nasir Ibrahim Fikri, Malaysian politician
- Samia Fikri (born 1999), Moroccan footballer

== Other uses ==
- Nurul Fikri Boarding School, secondary schools in Indonesia
