= Moneim =

Moneim is a given name and surname. Notable people with the name include:

- Abdel Moneim El-Guindi, Egyptian boxer
- Abdel Moneim Madbouly (1921–2006), Egyptian actor, comedian, and playwright
- Abdel Moneim Wahby (1911–1988), Egyptian basketball player, referee, and administrator
- Alaa El-Din Abdul Moneim (born 1951), current "independent member" of the Egyptian Parliament
- Prince Muhammad Abdul Moneim Beyefendi (1899–1979), Egyptian prince and former heir apparent to the throne of Egypt and Sudan
