= Adir Hu =

Ashkenazi Jewish Passover hymn

Adir Hu, Passover song, Recorded at a Hasidic Tish in the Bohush Beit Midrash, Benei Berak, 2011, by Haim Rosenrauch

Adir Hu (English: Mighty is He, Hebrew: אדיר הוּא) is a hymn sung by Ashkenazi Jews worldwide at the Passover Seder. It switches rapidly between saying the virtues of God in an alphabet format (Aleph, Bet, Gimel,...), and expressing hope that God will "rebuild the Holy Temple speedily." Most of the virtues of God are adjectives (for instance, Holy (Kadosh) is he); however, a few are nouns. (Lord is he).

Adir Hu is sung towards the end of the Seder. The traditional melody is a bouncy, major one. Other melodies, however, have been composed for the alphabetical song.

== History ==
The tune of Adir Hu has gone through several variations over the years, but its origin is from the German minnesinger period. The earliest existing music for Adir Hu is found in the 1644 "Rittangel Hagada". The second form is found in the 1677 "Hagada Zevach Pesach", and the third and closest form can be found in the 1769 "Selig Hagada". In the 1769 version of the haggadah, the song was also known in German as the "Baugesang" (the song of the rebuilding of the Temple). A traditional German greeting on the night of Passover after leaving the synagogue was "Bau Gut" ("build well"), a reference to Adir Hu.

A Yiddish version of Adir Hu (Yiddish: אלמעכטיגר גוט, romanized: Almekhtiger Got, lit. 'Mighty is He') appears in several editions of the haggadah, beginning with the fifteenth-century Ms. BNF Hébreu 1333 and with the 1526 Prague Haggadah. Menachem Mendel Kasher points out that it is in fact unclear whether the Yiddish or the Hebrew version is original.

== Text ==
Transliteration

ADIR HU

Adir hu, adir hu

Chorus:
Yivneh veito b'karov
Bim'heirah, bim'heirah, b'yameinu b'karov
Ei-l b'neih! Ei-l b'neih!
B'neih veit'kha b'karov

Bachur hu, gadol hu, dagul hu,
(Chorus)

Hadur hu, vatik hu, zakai hu, chasid hu,
(Chorus)

Tahor hu, yachid hu, kabir hu,
Lamud hu, melekh hu, nora hu,
Sagiv hu, izuz hu, podeh hu, tzadik hu
(Chorus)

Kadosh hu, rachum hu, shaddai hu,
takif hu
(Chorus)

English Translation

GOD IS MIGHTY

He is mighty, He is mighty

Chorus:
May He soon rebuild his house
Speedily, speedily and in our days, soon.
God, rebuild! God, rebuild!
Rebuild your house soon!

He is distinguished, He is great, He is exalted
(Chorus)

He is glorious, He is faithful, He is faultless, He is righteous
(Chorus)

He is pure, He is unique, He is powerful
He is wise, He is king, He is awesome
He is sublime, He is all-powerful, He is redeemer, He is all-righteous
(Chorus)

He is holy, He is compassionate, He is almighty, He is omnipotent
(Chorus)

== Variants ==
Modern variants of the hymn have been written, such as a feminist version by Rabbi Jill Hammer.

== See also ==
- Passover Seder
- Passover
