= Abdul Wadud Sardar =

Bangladeshi politician

Member of Bangladesh Parliament
- In office 18 February 1979 – 12 February 1982

Personal details
- Political party: Bangladesh Nationalist Party

Abdul Wadud Sardar (Bengali: আব্দুল ওয়াদুদ সরদার) is a Bangladesh Nationalist Party politician and a former member of parliament for Bakerganj-8.

== Career ==
Sardar was elected to parliament from Bakerganj-8 as a Bangladesh Nationalist Party candidate in 1979.
