= Sahir =

Sahir is a given name. Notable people with the name include:

- Sahir Edoo (born 1987), Mauritian badminton player
- Sahir Hoshiarpuri (1913–1994), Urdu poet
- Sahir Lodhi, Pakistani actor, director, and host
- Sahir Ludhianvi (died 1980), Urdu poet
- Sahir Naqash (born 1990), German cricketer
