= Fawaz =

Fawaz (sometimes, Fawwaz or Fawez) is a masculine Arabic given name and a surname. Its literal meaning is "winner", as it is the masculine adjective from the verb فاز fāz, meaning "he won". Therefore, it can be thought of as the equivalent to the given name Victor.

== Given name ==
=== First name ===
- Fawaz Akhras, London-based Syrian cardiologist and father-in-law of Bashar al-Assad
- Fawaz Damra, imam who lived near Cleveland, Ohio
- Fawaz Gerges (born 1958), Lebanese American academic and author
- Fawwaz Haddad, Syrian novelist
- Fawaz Al-Hasawi (born 1968), Kuwaiti businessman and owner of Nottingham Forest Football Club
- Fawaz Hussain (born 1953), contemporary Kurdish writer and translator
- Fawaz Naman Hamoud Abdullah Mahdi, citizen of Yemen held in extrajudicial detention in the US Guantanamo Bay detainment camps in Cuba
- Fawaz Mando (born 1971), Syrian footballer
- Fawaz al-Nashimi (died 2004), member of Al-Qaeda, the 20th hijacker of the September 11th attacks
- Fawaz al-Rabeiee (1979–2006), al-Qaeda terrorist sentenced to death in 2004 by a Yemeni court
- Fawaz al-Rabihi, citizen of Yemen believed to have played a role in the terrorist attack on the MV Limburg
- Fawwaz bin Abdulaziz Al Saud, Saudi royal
- Fawwaz T. Ulaby, Syrian professor of electrical engineering and computer science
- Fawaz Younis (born 1959), Lebanese skyjacker who was arrested and imprisoned by the United States
- Fawaz Zureikat (born 1955), Jordanian businessman

=== Middle name ===
- Sherif Fawaz Sharaf (born 1938), Jordanian diplomat
- Muhammad Fawwaz Mohamad Jan (born 1983), Malaysian politician, Permatang Pauh MP

== Surname ==
- Bilal Fawaz, also known as Kelvin Fawaz, UK-based Nigerian born boxer of Lebanese/Benin descent
- Fadi Fawaz George Michael's partner
- Florence Fawaz childhood name of Australian soprano
- Khalid al-Fawwaz convicted member of al-Qaeda
- Leila Tarazi Fawaz, Lebanese historian, director of The Fares Center for Eastern Mediterranean Studies (2001–2012)
- Mimi Fawaz, Nigerian-Lebanese journalist
- Ramzi Fawaz, American academic of Egyptian descent
