= Wafaa (name) =

Arabic female given name

Wafaa or Wafa
- Gender: Female
- Language: Arabic

Origin
- Meaning: Loyalty or faithfulness

Other names
- Related names: Rajaa, Safa, Walaa; Sana

Wafaa or Wafa (وفاء) (also Wafa or Wava) is an Arabic given name and surname meaning "Loyalty, Faithfulness".

Notable people with the name include:

== Given name ==
- Wafaa Ismail Baghdadi (born 1969), Egyptian athlete
- Wafaa Bilal (born 1966), American artist
- Wafaa El-Sadr (born 1950), Egyptian physician
- Wafaa Lamrani (born 1960), Moroccan poet
- Wafa Masghouni (born 2007), Tunisian taekwondo practitioner
- Wafaa Sleiman (born 1952), Lebanese first lady
- Wafa Sultan (born 1958), Syrian psychiatrist and author

== Surname ==
- Semiulla Wafin (Wafa) (1909–1983), Finnish Tatar entrepreneur, cultural figure

== See also ==
- Wafaa Bloc
