= Nabih =

Nabih is an Arabic male name meaning "witty, intelligent." Notable people with the surname include:

== Persons ==
=== Given name ===
- Nabih Berri (born 1938), Speaker of the Parliament of Lebanon
- Nabih Youssef, Egyptian-American structural engineer

=== Surname ===
- Osama Nabih (born 1975), Egyptian footballer

== Places ==
- Nabih Saleh, an island of Bahrain in Persian Gulf

== Business ==
- Nabih's Inc., consumer electronics retailer and information technology consultant in Evanston, Illinois
