= Muhammad Haykal =

Muhammad Haykal is the name of:

- Muhammad Husayn Haykal (1888–1956), Egyptian writer
- Mohamed Hassanein Heikal (1923–2016), Egyptian writer, journalist and politician
- Muhammed Hussein Heikal, Egyptian writer, journalist, politician and Minister of Education in Egypt
