= Wajih =

Wajih (Arabic: وَجِيه) is an Arabic masculine given name. It means both face and notable or man of status. It is used to refer to the Christian prophet Jesus in Quran. Notable people with the name include:

- Wajih Abdel-Azim (born 1979), Egyptian football player
- Wajih Azaizeh (born 1955), Jordanian politician
- Wajih Fanous (1948–2022), Lebanese literary critic and academic
- Wajih-uz-Zaman Khan (born 1965), Pakistani politician
- Wajih Al Madani (1921–1991), Palestinian army commander
- Wajih Nahlé (1932–2017), Lebanese painter
- Wajih Owais (born 1947), Jordanian politician
