= Maytham =

Maysam
- Gender: Male

Origin
- Origin: Semitic languages
- Meaning: "crushing" [hoof]

Other names
- Related names: Meysam, Meisam, Meyssam, Meesam, Maysam, Mayssam, Maisum, Maisam

Meysam, Maitham or Maytham (Arabic: ميثم, Azerbaijani: Meysəm, Turkish: Meysem, Persian: میثم) is an internationally used male name given name originating from the Semitic languages. The name comes from the Arabic root w-th-m and means crushing as in the sound made by the hooves of a horse or camel.

Initially a popular name in the Muslim World (originally in the Arab World, Iran, Turkic World) and the name later became popular among the Muslims of the other countries.

== People with this name ==
=== Maytham ===
- Maytham al-Tammar (died 680 AD), was a loyal and trustworthy companion of Imam Ali ibn Abu Talib. He is revered by millions for his contributions towards Islam, discipline towards Imam Ali, and sacrifices for the religion.

=== Maitham ===
- Maitham Al Bahrani (1238–1299), 12th-century Shi’ite scholar from Bahrain

=== Meysam ===
- Meysam Kebriaei (born 1981) MD, MBA. Iranian-American pediatric neurosurgeon from Taleghan, Iran. Currently practices in Minneapolis, Minnesota.
- Meysam Maniei (born 1982), Iranian football player
- Meysam Khosravi (born 1983), Iranian footballer who plays for Steel Azin F.C.
- Meysam Soleimani (born 1982), Iranian football defender
- Meysam Hosseini (born 1987), Iranian footballer who plays for Esteghlal

=== Maysam ===
- Maysam Baou (born 1983), Iranian football player who currently plays for Shahrdari Tabriz F.C.
- Maysam Aghaei (born 1990), Iranian footballer who currently plays for Shensa Arak F.C.

=== Meisam ===
- Meisam Mostafa-Jokar (born 1985), freestyle wrestler from Iran
- Meisam Rezapour (born 1981), Iranian football player
