= Afaf =

Afaf (عفاف), transliterated from Tunisian Arabic as Afef, is an Arabic language feminine given name. Notable people with the name include:

== Given name ==
- Afaf El-Hodhod (born 1996), Egyptian sport shooter
- Afaf Lutfi al-Sayyid-Marsot (born 1933), Egyptian historian
- Afaf Meleis (born 1942), Egyptian nursing professor
- Afaf Zurayk (born 1948), Lebanese artist
- Afef Ben Ismail (born 1994), Tunisian sprint canoeist
- Afef Ben Mahmoud, Tunisian actress and director
- Afef Jnifen (born 1963), Tunisian-Italian fashion model and television presenter
