= Nazif =

Nazif (Arabic: نظيف, IPA: [naˈzˤiːf]) is an Arabic masculine given name, meaning "pure", "clean", "innocent", "neat and clean" and "chaste". It is also a surname. Notable people with the name include:

== Given name ==
- Nazif Kayacık (1872–1951), Turkish Army general
- Nazif Memedi (born 1956), Croatian politician
- Nazif Shahrani, Afghan academic
- Nazif ibn Yumn (died 990), Melkite Christian mathematician
- Serdar Nazif Nasır, Turkish plastic surgeon

== Surname ==
- Ahmed Nazif (born 1952), Egyptian politician
- Süleyman Nazif (1870–1927), Turkish poet
