= Lulwa =

Lulwa (لولوة) is an Arabic given name for females. It is derived from the word لؤلؤة lu’lú’a, meaning "pearl". People named Lulwa include:

- Lulwa Al Awadhi, Bahraini women's rights advocate
- Lolowah bint Faisal Al Saud, Saudi Arabian princess
