= Yamina (name) =

Yamina (Arabic: يمينة) is a given name. Notable people with the name include:

- Yamina Bachir (born 1954), Algerian film director and screenwriter
- Yamina Benguigui (born 1955), French film director and politician
- Yamina Halata (born 1991), Algerian judoka
- Yamina Méchakra (1949–2013), Algerian novelist and psychiatrist
