= Hichem =

Hichem is a given name for males. People named Hichem include:

- Hichem Essifi, Tunisian footballer
- Hichem Hamdouchi, Moroccan chess player
- Hichem Mechichi, Prime Minister of Tunisia
- Hichem Rostom, Tunisian actor
- Hichem Samandi, Tunisian fencer
- Hichem Yacoubi, Moroccan actor
