= Sabiha =

Sabiha is an Arabic word (صبيحة) meaning "Morning" and a female given name. Notable people with the name include:

== Given name ==
- Sabiha Bengütaş (1904–1992), Turkish sculptor
- Sabiha Rüştü Bozcalı (1904–1998), Turkish visual artist and illustrator
- Sabiha Gökçen (1913–2001), Turkish female combat pilot
- Sabiha Gökçül Erbay (1900–1998), Turkish teacher and politician
- Sabiha Khanum (1935–2020), Pakistani film actress
- Sabiha Al Khemir (born 1959), Tunisian writer, illustrator, and Islamic art expert
- Sabiha Sertel (1895–1968), Turkish journalist
- Sabiha Sultan (1894–1971), Ottoman princess, daughter of Mehmed VI
- Sabiha Sumar (born 1961), Pakistani filmmaker
