= Naqibullah =

Naqibullah may refer to

- Naqeebullah Mehsud (1991–2018), a Pakistani ethnic Pashtun who was killed in a fake police encounter
- Mullah Naqib, also called Naqibullah (c. 1950–2007), Afghan mujahideen commander and politician
- Naqibullah (child detainee), Afghan held in Guantanamo
- Shahwali Shaheen Naqeebyllah, Afghan held in Guantanamo
