= Chadli =

Chadli or Chedli (Arabic: شاذلي) is an Arab given name and surname.

Given name

- Chadli Bendjedid (1929–2012), former President of Algeria
- Chedli Klibi (1925–2020), former Tunisian politician and secretary General of the Arab League
- Chadli Amri (born 1984), Algerian footballer

Family name

- Nacer Chadli (born 1989), Belgian footballer
- Adel Chedli (born 1976), Tunisian footballer
