= Dhikrullah =

Dhikrullah (also spelled Zikrullah) (Arabic: ذكر الله) is an Arabic given name built on the words Dhikr and Allah, meaning Remembrance of Allah.

== Notable bearers ==
- Dhikru'llah Khadem (1904–1986), Iranian Hand of the Cause Bahá'í
