= Mahbubur =

Mahbubur is an Arabic name meaning beloved. The name is very common in the Muslim countries of South Asia (e.g. Bangladesh and Pakistan). People with this name include:

- Mahbubur Rahman (disambiguation), several people
- Mahbubur Raschid (fl. 20th century), Pakistani banker
- Mahbubur Rob Sadi (1942–2016), Bengali freedom fighter and politician
