= Hibatullah (name) =

Hibatullah (Arabic: هبة الله) is an Arabic masculine given name, meaning gift of God. Notable people with the name include:

== Given name ==
- Hibatullah Akhundzada (born 1967), supreme leader of Afghanistan since 2021
- Hibat Allah Abu'l-Barakat al-Baghdaadi (1080–1165), Iraqi Islamic polymath
- Hibatullah ibn Musa Abu Nasr al-Mu'ayyad fi'l-Din al-Shirazi (1000–1078), Persian Isma'ili scholar
- Izz bin Hibatullah Al Hadid (1190–1258), Persian Islamic scholar

== Surname ==
- Sa'd al-Dawla al-Safi ibn Hibatullah (1240–1291), Persian Jewish physician and statesman
