= Ikrimah =

Ikrimah (Arabic: عكرمة, meaning Dove) is an Arabic name.

People named Ikrimah include:

- Ikrimah ibn Abi-Jahl, a known early Muslim leader and companion of Muhammad,
- Ikrimah, one of Ali's famous partisans, praised by Shi'as.
