= Sanaullah =

Sanaullah, also spelled Thanaullah (Arabic: ثناء الله) is a male Muslim given name and surname, meaning praise of God. Notable people with the name include:

- Qadi Thanaullah Panipati (died 1810), Early modern Northwestern Indian Islamic scholar
- Sanaullah Khan Niazi (born 1960), Pakistan Army general
- Sanaullah Baloch, Pakistani politician
- Rana Sanaullah Khan (born 1955), Pakistani lawyer
- Sanaullah Amritsari, British Indian Muslim scholar
