= Fadwa (name) =

Fadwa (Arabic: فدوى) is an Arabic feminine name.

== People ==
- Fadwa Al-Bouza (born 1990), Syrian athlete
- Fadwa Barghouti (born 1963), Palestinian poet
- Fadwa El Gallal, Libyan-American journalist
- Fadwa El Guindi (born 1941), Egyptian-American anthropologist
- Fadwa Garci (born 2002), Tunisian table tennis player
- Fadwa Hammoud, American lawyer
- Fadwa Obeid (1935–2022), American singer
- Fadwa Sidi Madane (born 1994), Moroccan athlete
- Fadwa Souleimane (1970–2017), Syrian actress
- Fadwa Taha (born 1955), Sudanese professor
- Fadwa Tuqan (1917–2003), Palestinian poet

== Other uses ==
- Food and Fadwa (2012), a comedy drama, the first production of the Noor Theatre Company
- "Le corps de Fadwa" (2012), a story by Moroccan writer Abdellah Taïa
- Fadwa Ali, a character in the Dorothy Gilman novel Mrs. Pollifax and the Whirling Dervish (2021)
