= Afreen =

Female given name

آفرین, عفرين
- Gender: Female
- Language: Persian, Arabic
- Name day: Friday

Origin
- Origin: Middle East
- Meaning: Praise, beautiful, elegant, amazing, lovely
- Region of origin: Middle East

Other names
- Alternative spelling: Afrin, Aafreen, Afryn
- Variant forms: Afarin, Aafreen
- Related names: Aafreen

Afreen آفرین is a female name, usually given, meaning "Most beautiful", "Enlightenment", and Houri of heaven. Its origins lie in the Middle East. It is also used within the Persian language. Afreen has many regional meanings, including "Most powerful Rose" in Arabic, "مهتاب (moonlight)" in Persian, “Gem" in Egyptian.

== Etymology ==
The name and expression derives from Middle Persian 𐭠𐭯𐭥𐭩𐭭 āfrīn "praise, blessing" and is also the present tense form of the verb آفریدن âfaridan "to create". The expression has been translated by some as "praise to the creator!".

== In popular culture ==
"Afreen Afreen" is a 1996 song sung by musician and Qawwali singer Nusrat Fateh Ali Khan.
