= Sabri Ali =

Djibouti footballer (born 2000)

Personal information
- Full name: Sabri Ali Mohamed
- Date of birth: 20 September 2000 (age 26)
- Position: Forward

Team information
- Current team: FC Dikhil

International career^{‡}
Years	Team	Apps	(Gls)
2021–	Djibouti	2	(0)
- ‡ National team caps and goals as of 13:32, 22 July 2021 (UTC)

Sabri Ali (born 20 September 2000) is a Djiboutian footballer who plays as a forward for Djibouti Premier League club FC Dikhil and the Djibouti national team.

== Club career ==
As of March 2021, Ali plays for FC Dikhil of the Djibouti Premier League. For the 2021 season he was among the top goal scorers in the league.

== International career ==
Ali featured for the Djibout national under-20 team at the 2019 CECAFA U-20 Championship and the 2020 CECAFA U-20 Championship. In summer 2021 he was part of the Djibouti squad for the 2021 CECAFA U-23 Challenge Cup.

Ali made his senior international debut on 15 June 2021 in a friendly against Somalia. Later that month he was part of Djibouti's squad for a 2021 FIFA Arab Cup qualification match against Lebanon. He went on to appear in the 0–1 defeat as a second-half substitute.

=== International career statistics ===
As of match played 23 June 2021.

Djibouti national team
Year	Apps	Goals
2021	2	0
Total	2	0
