= Najibullah =

Najibullah (Arabic: نجيب الله) is a male Muslim given name, composed of the elements Najib and Allah. It means distinguished (servant) of God. It may refer to:

== People ==
- Mohammad Najibullah (1947–1996), President of Afghanistan
- Najeebullah Anjum (born 1955), Pakistani film and television actor
- Najibullah (militant leader) (born ca. 1979), leader of Taliban splinter group Fidai Mahaz in Afghanistan
- Najibullah Zazi (born 1985), Afghan imprisoned in the US for terrorist offenses
- Najibullah Lafraie, Foreign Minister of Afghanistan between 1992 and 1996
- Najibullah Quraishi, Afghan journalist and film maker
- Najibullah Zadran, Afghan international cricketer

== Places ==
- Kot Najeebullah, town in Pakistan
