= Shafiqullah =

Shafiqullah is a male Muslim given name. It may refer to

- Shafiqullah (cricketer) (born 1989), Afghanistan cricketer
- Shafiqullah Mohammadi, Afghan provincial governor under the Taliban
