= Saqib =

Saqib is the Persian pronunciation originally from the Arabic name, Thaqib (ثاقب thāqib), is a masculine given name which means "influential notion of the well-chosen, the truthful".

Notable people with this name include:

- Saqib Ali (born 1975), member of Maryland House of Delegates
- Saqib Ali (cricketer) (born 1978), a United Arab Emirates cricketer
- Saqib Bhatti (born 1985), British Conservative politician
- Saqib Hanif (born 1994), a Pakistani football player
- Saqib Mahmood (born 1997), English cricketer who plays for Lancashire
- Saqib Mahmood (cricketer, born 1977) (born 1977), English cricketer who played for Somerset
- Saquib Nachan (died 2025), convicted criminal
- Saqib Qureshi (1947–1998), a Pakistani cricket umpire
- Saqib Saleem (born 1988), an Indian film actor
- Saqib Sumeer, Pakistani performer and writer
- Saqib Zulfiqar (born 1997), a Dutch cricketer
