= Nasuh =

Nasuh (also spelled Nasouh, Arabic: نصوح) is an Arabic masculine given name that may refer to:

== Given name ==
- Matrakçı Nasuh (1480 – c. 1564), Ottoman Bosnian polymath
- Nasouh Al Nakdali (born 1993), Syrian footballer
- Nasuh Akar (1925–1984), Turkish sports wrestler
- Nasuh Mahruki (born 1968), Turkish mountain climber
- Nasuh Pasha (died 1614), Ottoman statesman and grand vizier

== Other uses ==
- Treaty of Nasuh Pasha, treaty between Ottoman Turkey and Safavid Persia after the war of 1603 - 1612
