= Satam =

- Pronunciation: [sɑtˤɑːm]
- Gender: Male

Origin
- Origin: Arabic and Indian

Satam or Sattam (Arabic: سطام), (Sanskrit: सत्तम) is a male given name. It may refer to another form of (Arabic: صدام, Ṣaddām) which means "one who confronts", or Sattam (Sanskrit: सत्तम), meaning "Excellent one" or "Beautiful one"

== People ==
=== First name ===
- Satam al-Suqami (1976–2001), Saudi Arabian terrorist
- Sattam bin Abdulaziz Al Saud (1941–2013), Saudi Arabian politician and governor
- Sattam bin Khalid bin Nasser Al Saud, Saudi Arabian prince

=== Surname ===
- Ameet Bhaskar Satam (born 1977), Indian politician
- A. N. Sattam Pillai (1823–1918), Indian theologian
- Shivaji Satam (born 1950), Indian actor

== Other uses ==
- Sattam, 1983 film
- Sattam En Kaiyil, 1978 film
- Sattam Oru Iruttarai, 1981 film
- Sattam Oru Iruttarai, 2012 film
- Sattam Oru Vilayaattu, 1987 film
- Sattam Sirikkiradhu, 1982 film

== See also ==
- Prince Sattam Bin Abdulaziz University, Saudi Arabia
- Sonic the Hedgehog (TV series), a Saturday morning cartoon also known as Sonic SatAM
