= Asghar =

Asghar (Persian: اصغر) is a masculine given name and surname of Arabic origin. Notable people with the name include:

== Given name ==
- Asghar Afghan (born 1987), Afghan cricketer
- Asghar Ali (cricketer, born 1971) (born 1971), United Arab Emirates cricketer
- Asghar Ali (cricketer, born 1924) (1924–1979), cricketer in India from 1943 to 1949, and in Pakistan from 1949 to 1957
- Ali Asghar Bazri (born 1980), Iranian wrestler
- Asghar Ali Engineer (1939–2013), Indian civil engineer, Islamic scholar, and religious figure
- Asghar Farhadi (born 1972), Iranian film director and screenwriter
- Ali al-Asghar ibn Husayn (680–680), the youngest child of Husayn ibn Ali
- Asghar Khan (1921–2018), Pakistani Air Force veteran fighter pilot and politician
- Asghar Qadir (born 1946), Pakistani mathematician and scientist in the field of cosmology

== Surname ==
- Mohammad Asghar (1945–2020), Welsh politician, father of Natasha Asghar
- Mohammad Asghar (cricketer) (born 1998), Pakistani Cricketer
- Natasha Asghar, Welsh politician, daughter of Welsh politician Mohammad Asghar
- Sohail Asghar (1954–2021), Pakistani actor
