= Kasymbek Yeshmambetov =

Kyrgyz writer

- Born: Kasymbek Yeshmambetov; 2 October 1910; Orto-Say, Kirghiz ASSR, Soviet Union
- Died: 10 February 1984 (aged 73)
- Occupation: Author

Kasymbek Yeshmambetov (Kyrgyz: Эшмамбетов Касымбек; 2 October 1910 – 10 February 1984) was a Kyrgyz writer, playwright, translator, and a member of the Union of Soviet Writers.

== Early life ==
He was born in Orto-Say to a peasant family. Until 1920, he studied at the agriculture school. He graduated from the Pedagogical College in Frunze in 1930.

== Career ==
He taught medicine, economics and construction during his time at the college. In 1930, he published his first story, "The Mystery of Nature," and seven years later, he wrote the play Saryndzhi. He translated various works of William Shakespeare, Alexander Ostrovsky, Pushkin, Fyodor Dostoevsky, Leo Tolstoy and others in Kyrgyz. He published books in Russian, including Pieces (1958), Four of the most daring (1958), Hunter with a golden eagle (1960) and The Dream (1964).

== Recognition ==
He won the award for Literature and Art in the Great Patriotic War (1941–1945) and the Nero medal for labor.

== Bibliography ==
- The Mystery of Nature (1930)
- Saryndzhi (1937)
- Pieces (1958)
- Four of the Most Daring (1958)
- Hunter with a Golden Eagle (1960)
- Dream (1964)
