= Dareen =

Dareen (دارين) is an Arabic feminine given name which means 'rare luxurious fragrance', was it is delivered from the ancient coastal city Dārīn in the Persian gulf, that was a trade hub for rare spices and musks. Notable people with the name include:

- Dareen Abu Ghaida (born 1985), Canadian journalist
- Dareen Tatour (born c. 1982), Palestinian poet and photographer
