= Fouzan =

Arabic name

Fouzan, also spelled Fawzan, Fowzan, and Fauzan, is an Arabic name meaning "successful," "success," "victorious," or "victor." The root word is "fouz", and the tense is symbolized by the "an". In the Arabic language, there is a single and plural tense, as well as a dual tense. The suffix, "an", represents the dual tense of a word. Therefore, the true meaning of "Fouzan" is dual success.

The term is derived from the Arabic Qur'an, in which it appears multiple times, including the fifth verse of the chapter in the Qur'an. in Surah Fath,"The Victory" The word Fouzan appears when describing the Highest Accomplishment of man, which is the Acceptance into Jannah. It appears in the form of Fouzan-Azeema, which means "Great Success" or "The Highest Achievement" and is used in the context of the description of the Everlasting Eternal Success, which is a result of the individual who remains dedicated to God, and attains Paradise for himself.
