= Jabr (slave) =

Companion of the Islamic prophet Muhammad

Jabr was a young Christian slave who belonged to the Banu i-Hadrami tribe of Mecca. Jabr was later called a companion of the Islamic prophet Muhammad.

Accusations of informants contributing to Muhammad's recitations were made by his opponents. Jabr is identified by name in one account mentioned by Ibn Ishaq:

The apostle used to sit at al-Marwa at the booth of a young Christian called Jabr, slave of Banu I-Hadrami, and they used to say; 'The one who teaches Muhammad most of what he brings is Jabr the Christian, slave of the Banu I-Hadrami.

He is also identified by his kunya by Muqatil ibn Sulayman but called a Jew. This is an except glossed by Claude Gillot:

There was a servant of ‘Amir b. al-Hadrami al-Qurashi. He was a Jew, not an Arab [or spoke bad Arabic, a‘jami]; he spoke Greek [more likely: Aramaic], and his name was Abu Fukayha Yasar. As the Qurayshis saw the Prophet speaking with him, they said: 'Indeed, he is being taught by Abu Fukayha Yasar.'

== Bibliography ==
- Gilliot, Claude (2008). "Reconsidering the authorship of the Qur'an: is the Qur'an partly the fruit of a progressive and collective work?". In Reynolds, Gabriel Said (ed.). The Qur'an in its Historical Context. London: Routledge. ISBN 9780415428996.
- Guillaume, Alfred (1978). The Life of Muhammad: A Translation of Ibn Ishaq's Sirat Rasul Allah. Karachi: Oxford University Press. p. 180. ISBN 978-0196360331.
