= Afghan-Canadian Community Centre in Kandahar =

The Afghan-Canadian Community Centre in Kandahar has helped educate thousands of Afghan women and girls. Among the organizations which have funded the centre are the Canadian International Learning Foundation and the Canadian International Development Agency.

Ehsanullah Ehsan the principal and founder of the school has faced on-going death threats from the Taliban.
