= Zakiya =

Zakiah
- Gender: Female or Male
- Language: Hebrew

Origin
- Meaning: pure

Other names
- Related names: Katherine

Zakiya, Zakia, Zakiyah, Zakiyya or Zakieh may represent two different female given names of Arabic origin, namely Arabic: زكية (zakiat), meaning "pure", corresponding to the male name Zaki, and Arabic: ذكيه (ḏakiyya), meaning "intelligent".

Zakiah (Hebrew: זַכִּיָה), also spelt Zakiya, Zakia, Zakiyah, or Zakayah, is a Hebrew female given name also meaning "pure". It may be used as a Hebrew equivalent of Katherine, owing to Katherine's supposed Greek derivation from katharos "pure".

== List of people with the given name Zakiya or Zakia ==
- Zakiya Bywaters (born 1991), professional soccer player
- Zakiya Dalila Harris (born 1992), American author
- Zakia Jafri (1938/39–2025), Indian human rights activist
- Zakia Khattabi (born 1976), Belgian politician
- Zakiya (singer) (born 1977), American singer
- Zakia Mrisho Mohamed (born 1984), Tanzanian long-distance runner
- Zakiya Nassar (born 1987), Palestinian swimmer
- Zakiya Randall (born 1991), American golfer
- Zakia Wardak, Afghan architect, politician, and businesswoman
