= Naif (disambiguation) =

Naif is a locality in the United Arab Emirates.

Naif may also refer to:

- Naif (name), including a list of people and fictional characters with the given name or surname
- Naif (band), an Indonesian band
- Naif, a male person with naivety
- Navigation and Ancillary Information Facility, a part of NASA that developed the SPICE observation geometry system
- Norwegian Federation of American Sports ('Norges Amerikanske Idretters Forbund')
