= Wahed =

Wahed is a surname or given name, and may refer to:

- Abdul Wahed Al Sayed (born 1977), Egyptian footballer
- Raes Abdul Wahed, Afghan warlord
- Wahed Nazari (born 1953), Afghan film director

== See also ==
- Abdel-Wahed
- Wahid or Waheed, a given name and a surname
