= Naima (disambiguation) =

"Naima" is a ballad by John Coltrane, composed in 1959, and named after his first wife Juanita Naima Coltrane (née Grubbs).

Naima may also refer to:

== People ==
- Mustafa Naima (1655–1716), Ottoman historian
- Naïma (Comoros singer), Comorian singer
- Naïma Ababsa (1963–2021), Algerian singer
- Naima Adedapo (born 1984), American singer and dancer
- Naima Akef (1929–1966), Egyptian belly dancer
- Naima Bakkal (born 1990), Moroccan taekwondo athlete
- Naïma Ben Ali, former First Lady of Tunisia
- Naima Bock, English musician
- Naima Coster, Dominican-American writer
- Naima El Bezaz (1974–2020), Moroccan-Dutch writer
- Naima El Jeni (born 1958), Tunisian actress
- Naima Farhi (born 1976), Algerian politician
- Naima García (born 1998), Spanish footballer
- Naima Haider (born 1962), Bangladeshi justice
- Naima Kay (born 1991), South African singer
- Naima Khan (born 1972), Pakistani actress
- Naima Khan Upreti (1938–2018), Indian actor, singer, and producer
- Naima Lamcharki (1943–2024), Moroccan actress
- Naima Mora (born 1984), American fashion model
- Naïma Moreira-Laliberté (born 1996), Canadian Equestrian Team athlete
- Naïma Moutchou (born 1980), French lawyer and politician
- Naima Ramos-Chapman, American director, writer, and actress
- Naima Reddick (born 1984), American rugby union player
- Naima Samih (1953–2025), Moroccan artist
- Naima Wifstrand (1890–1968), Swedish actress and singer

=== Fictional characters ===
- Naima Jeffery, fictional character from the BBC soap opera EastEnders

== Albums ==
- Naima, alternative title of the 1992 album Over the Rainbow by New York Unit
- Naima (Eric Dolphy album), 1987
- Naima (Vladislav Delay album), 2002

== Other uses ==
- Naima, a 1990s jazz band that included Dominique Eade and Joe McPhee
- "Naima", a 1994 lullaby by Angélique Kidjo
- North American Insulation Manufacturers Association; see Glass fiber
