= Safiullah =

Safiullah is an Arabic name originating from its use in the Islamic script known as the Qur'an. The name Safiullah directly translates to "Pure one of Allah".

== "Safiullah" as a given name ==
- Maulana Safiullah Dadaji (1870–1948), Indian Islamic scholar
- Safiullah Khan Tanoli (1889–1947), South Asian officer of the British Army
- Safiullah Khan (born in 1979), Pakistani footballer
- Safiullah Rauf (born in 1994), Afghan-American humanitarian worker

== "Safiullah" as a family name ==
- Syed Safiullah (1945–2016), Bangladeshi chemist
- M. Safiullah (1946–2008), Bangladeshi politician
- A. M. M. Safiullah (1947–2021), Bangladeshi scholar

== See also ==
- Saifullah
