= Shafiq-ur-Rahman =

Shafiq ur Rahman (or Rehman, Arabic: شفیق الرحمن) is a male Muslim given name. It may refer to

- Shafiq-ur-Rahman (commodore), (born 1945), Bangladeshi naval officer and politician
- Shafiq-ur-Rahman (humorist) (1920–2000), Pakistani humorist and Urdu short-story writer
- Shafiqur Rahman Barq (born 1930), Indian politician
- Shafik Rehman (born 1934), Bangladeshi journalist and writer
