= Maysoon =

Maysoon (also spelled Maysun) is an Arabic given name for females, meaning "beautiful face and body". Notable persons with that name include:

- Maysoon Al-Damluji (born 1962), Iraqi politician
- Maysoon al-Eryani (born 1987), Yemeni poet and translator
- Maysoon al-Hashemi (1940s–2006), Iraqi politician
- Maysoon Pachachi (born 1947), Iraqi film director
- Maysoon Zayid (born 1974), American actress and comedian
