= Zoraida =

Zoraida is a given name. Notable people with the given name include:

- Zoraida Gómez (born 1985), Mexican actress
- Zoraida Sambolin (born 1965), American television journalist
- Zoraida Santiago (born 1952), Puerto Rican composer and singer
- Zoraida Córdova (born 1987), Ecuadorian-American writer and editor

== See also ==
- Zoraida (planthopper), a large genus of planthoppers (family Derbidae)
- Zoraida (play), a 1779 work by the British writer William Hodson
- Villa Zorayda, Saint Augustine, Florida
