= Hajra =

Indian female given name

Hajra (Arabic: هاجره) is a female given name in Indian subcontinent. The origin of the name is Arabic 'هاجر' (Hajar). It is one of the spellings of Hagar, the second wife of Ibrahim (Abraham) and mother of his first son, Ismail. Notable people with the name include:

== Given name ==
- Hajrah Begum (1910–2003), Indian politician
- Hajra Khan (actress), Pakistani actress
- Hajra Khan (footballer) (born 1993), Pakistani footballer
- Hajra Masroor (1930–2012), Pakistani feminist writer
- Hajra Waheed (born 1980), Canadian artist
- Hajra Yamin (born 1990), Pakistani actress

== See also ==
- Hagar in Islam
