= Rahmi =

Rahmi (Arabic: رحمي) is a masculine Arabic and Turkish given name, it may refer to:

== People ==
- Rahmi Arslan (1874–1947), Turkish politician
- Bedri Rahmi Eyüboğlu (1913–1975), Turkish painter and poet
- Hüseyin Rahmi Gürpınar (1864–1944), Turkish writer and politician
- Rahmi Koç (born 1930), Turkish businessman
- Rahmi Özcan (born 1990), Turkish amputee footballer

== Places ==
- Rahmi M. Koç Museum, private industrial museum in Istanbul, Turkey
