= Rakib =

Rakib Hossain is a Bengali masculine given name and surname of Arabic origin. Notable people with the name include:

== Given name ==
- Rakib Ehsan, British-Bangladeshi Phd., writer, media commentator
- Rakib Hossain (footballer) (born 1973), Bangladeshi cricketer
- Rakib Hossain (born 1998), Bangladeshi footballer
- Rakibul Atik (born 1999), Bangladeshi cricketer
- Rakibul Hasan (born 2002), Bangladeshi cricketer
- Rakibul Hussain (born 1964), Indian politician
- Rakibul Islam (born 1997), Bangladeshi cricketer

== Surname ==
- Abdullah Al Rakib (born 1980), Bangladeshi Grandmaster chess player
- Mohammad Rakib (born 1998), Bangladeshi cricketer
- Shlomo Rakib, Israeli electrical engineer
