= Hafizullah =

Hafizullah (Pashto/Dari: حفيظ الله) is an Afghan male given name, meaning “remembrance of God“ - a transliteration of the elements Hafiz and Allah. The name may refers to:

- Hafizullah Amin (1929–1979), General Secretary of the People's Democratic Party of Afghanistan
- Hafizullah Shabaz Khail (born 1946), Afghan held in Guantanamo
- Hafizullah Emadi (born 1952), Afghan-American writer
- Hafizullah (detainee) (born 1974), Afghan held in Guantanamo
- Hafizullah Qadami (born 1985), Afghan footballer
- Hafizullah Khaled, Afghan-Austrian peace activist and writer
