= Maha (name) =

Arabic female given name

- Gender: Female
- Language: Arabic

Origin
- Meaning: "half-moon", "beautiful eyes"

Maha (Arabic: مها, mahā) is an Arabic female given name meaning "half moon" or "beautiful eyes". The wild deer — or the Arabian oryx antelope, which is identified with the word mahā in some sources — has been traditionally celebrated in Arabic poetry for the beauty of its eyes. The phrase ‘uyūnu ’l-mahā (عُيُونُ الْمَهَا) or "eyes of the mahā" used in poetry to praise by the beauty of their beloved.

Other meanings are "the Sun", "the planet(s)", "mirror", "shining bright white pearl", "white stones that shine, twinkle or gleam", "mouth or (front) teeth" and "if something is more white, pure and very watery".

The written form of Maha is in the plural form as the singular form is written mahāh (مَهَاة).

People with the name include:

== Given name ==
- Maha Ali (born 1973), Jordanian politician and industrial engineer
- Maha Bayrakdar (1947–2025), Syrian and Lebanese poet and artist
- Maha Koraiem (born 1978), Australian author
- Maha bint Mishari Al Saud, Saudi Arabian royal and physician
- Maha Shehata (born 1989), Egyptian women's footballer
- Maha bint Mohammed Al Sudairi, Saudi royal
- Maha Tahirani, Pakistani supermodel, actress, and lawyer
