= Zuhal =

Zuhal is a given name, derived from the Arabic and Persian name for Saturn. Notable people with the name include:

- Zuhal Demir (born 1980), Belgian lawyer and politician
- Zuhal Olcay (born 1957), Turkish actress
- Zuhal Sultan (born 1991), Iraqi pianist
