= Raed =

Raed, Rayed (pronounced [ˈræːˈed]; Arabic: رائد, Rā'id) is an Arabic given name and surname, meaning leader or pioneer. Notable people with the name include:

== Raed ==
- Raed Arafat (born 1964), Syrian-born physician working in Romania, and Romanian government minister
- Raed Elhamali, Libyan-American basketball player
- Raed Fares, Syrian journalist, activist, and civil society leader
- Raed Jarrar, Iraqi-born architect, blogger, and political advocate
- Raed Al-Jishi (born 1976), Saudi poet and translator
- Ra'ed Al-Nawateer, Jordanian footballer
- Raed Salah, Palestinian politician
- Raed al-Saleh, founder and former director of the Syria Civil Defense, known as the White Helmets; current Minister of Emergency and Disaster Management in the Syrian transitional government
- Raed Zidan, first Palestinian man to summit Mount Everest, first Palestinian man to complete the Seven Summits

== Rayed ==
- Rayed Mohammed Abdullah Ali (born 1978), Saudi Arabian student pilot
- Rayed Abdullah Salem Al Harbi (1988–2009), Saudi Arabian terrorist
- Maryam Rayed, Afghan women's rights activist
