= International Journal of Low-Carbon Technologies =

- Language: English

Publication details
- Publisher: Oxford University Press (United Kingdom)

Standard abbreviations
- ISO 4: Int. J. Low-Carbon Technol.

Indexing
- ISSN: 1748-1317 (print); 1748-1325 (web)

Links
- Journal homepage

The International Journal of Low-Carbon Technologies (IJLCT) is an open access peer-reviewed academic journal of low-carbon technologies. It is published by Oxford University Press. It primarily focuses on renewable energy generation, environmental impact studies, CO_{2} reducation, and eco-friendly and sustainable technologies. The journal publishes research articles, technical notes, review papers, book reviews and focus issues. It accepts manuscripts in English.

According to the SCIMAGO journal ranking system over the previous decade (2014–2024), the journal has consistently remained in the first quartile (Q1) in the architecture sector, while it has been a Q2 journal in the fields of environmental science and civil and structural engineering. Its 2024 Journal Impact Factor (Clarivate) was 2.3, while its 2024 5-year factor was 2.4.

== Abstracting and Indexing ==
The journal is indexed by the following services and databases:

- Academic Search Complete
- CLOCKSS
- EI Compendex
- Inspec
- Portico
- Science Citation Index Expanded (Clarivate)
- Scopus
