= Abd al-Wadud =

ʻAbd al-Wadūd (ALA-LC romanization of Arabic: عبد الودود) is a male Muslim given name. It is built from the Arabic words ʻabd and al-Wadūd, one of the names of God in the Qur'an, which give rise to the Muslim theophoric names. It means "servant of the all-loving".

Alternative transliterations include Abdul Wadood, Abdel Wadoud and others, all subject to variable spacing and hyphenation. The name may refer to:

- Miangul Abdul Wadud (1881−1971), Wāli of Swat
- Kazi Abdul Wadud (1894−1970), Bengali essayist and dramatist
- Mohammad Abdul Wadud Chandpuri (1925–1983), Bangladeshi language activist and politician
- Abdul Wadud (musician) (1947−2022), American jazz & symphonic cellist
- Kazi Abdul Wadud Dara (born 1962), Bangladeshi politician
- Mohammad Abdul Wadud Bishwas (born 1964), Bangladeshi politician
- Abu Musab Abdel Wadoud (1970−2020), Algerian militant emir
- Abdul Wadud Sardar (born 1945), Bangladeshi base commander and politician
- Abdul Wadud, Bangladeshi lieutenant general
- Abdul Wadud Khan, Bangladeshi politician
- Kazi Abdul Wadud Dara, Bangladeshi politician
