= Rabih Jabr =

Rabih Jabr from the American University of Beirut, Lebanon was named Fellow of the Institute of Electrical and Electronics Engineers (IEEE) in 2016 for application of robust optimization to power systems. He was among the nearly 350 newly elevated Fellows in 2016.
