= Mohammad Taqi =

Mohammad-Taqi (محمد تقی), also spelled as Muhammad Taqi or Mohammad Taghi is a common name among Muslims, specially Shia Muslims. It may refer to the following:

- Muhammad al-Taqi (811 AD – 835), the 9th Ismaili Imam
- Mohammad-Taqi Bahar (1884 — 1951), Iranian poet, scholar and politician
- Muhammad Taqi-ud-Din al-Hilali (1893? - 1987?), Moroccan religious scholar
- Mohammad-Taqi Bahjat Foumani (1913 – 2009), Iranian Twelver Shi'a Marja
- Mohammad-Taqi Ja'fari (born 1923), Iranian theologian
- Mohammad-Taqi Mesbah-Yazdi (born 1934), Iranian Twelver Shi'i cleric and politician
- Mohamed Taki Abdoulkarim (1936 - 1998), President of the Comoros
- Taqi Usmani (born 1943), Pakistani Hanafi Islamic scholar
- Mohammad Taqi al-Modarresi (born 1945), Iraqi marja
- Kasim Muhammad Taqi al-Sahlani (born 1949), Iraqi politician
- Mohamed Taki (athlete) (born 1971), Moroccan middle-distance runner
- Muhammed Taqi (footballer) (born 1985), Omani footballer
- Muhammad Taqi (footballer), Pakistani footballer
- Muhammad Taqi (referee) (born 1986), Singaporean football referee
- Mohammad Taqi al-Khoei (died 1994), Iraqi cleric
- Muhammad Taqi Khan Bahadur, Nawab of Masulipatam
