= Khairunnisa =

Khairunnisa or Khair-un-nissa
- Pronunciation: [xɑjˈrunˈiːsɑ]
- Gender: Female

Origin
- Origin: Arab World
- Meaning: Woman with good deed
- Region of origin: Middle East

Other names
- Related names: Khayrat, Khayriyya

Khairunnisa (Arabic: خير النساء) is an Arabic female given name. It can also be spelt as Kherunnisa or Khair-un-nisa. Khair means "good" and nisa means "women", so the complete name means "goodness of women". It is the epithet for Khadijah bint Khuwaylid, Muhammad's first wife and the first Muslim convert.

The name is transliterated as Hayrünnisa in Turkey.

There are several other names with the suffix -un-nisa, such as Mehr-un-nisa and Zeb-un-nisa. The name "Nisa" can also be used independently and may alternatively be written as "Nissa", "Nysa", "Neesa" and "Nessa".

== Notable people ==
- Khairunnisa Ash'ari (born 1987), Bruneian activist and politician
- Salsabila Khairunnisa, Indonesian environmental activist

== See also ==
- Hayrünnisa
- Arabic name
- Turkish name
