= Tayfur =

Tayfur or Tayfour (/ˈtaɪfʊər/ TY-foor; Arabic: طيفور) is an Arabic surname. It is also a Turkish given name. Notable people with the name include:

== People with the surname ==
- Aref Tayfour, Iraqi politician
- Ibn Abi Tahir Tayfur, Persian linguist of Arabic language
- Ferdi Tayfur (1945–2025), Turkish singer, actor, director, songwriter and screenwriter
- Ghiath Tayfour (1969–2012), Syrian boxer

== People with the given name ==
- Tayfur Havutçu (born 1970), Turkish footballer
- Tayfur Sökmen, Turkish politician
- Tayfur Emre Yılmaz, Turkish footballer

== See also ==
- Tayfur Dam, dam in Turkey
