= Ziaur Rahman (disambiguation) =

Ziaur Rahman (1936–1981) was the President of Bangladesh from 1976 until 1981.

Ziaur Rahman or Zia ur Rehman (Arabic: ضیاء الرحمن) is a male Muslim given name, meaning Light of the Most Merciful. Other notable bearers of the name include:

- Zia-ur-Rehman (born 1997), Afghan cricketer
- Zia-ur-Rehman (militant) (born 1982), alias Faisal Nadeem and Abu Qatal Sindhi, a Pakistani Lashkar-e-Taiba militant, perpetrator of the 2023 Rajouri attacks and the 2024 Reasi attack
- Ziaur Rahman (Afghan cricketer) (born 1998), Afghan cricketer
- Ziaur Rahman (Bangladeshi cricketer) (born 1986), Bangladeshi cricketer
- Ziaur Rahman (chess player) (1974–2024), Bangladeshi chess grandmaster
- Ziaur Rahman (musician) (born 1975), Bangladeshi musician
- Ziaur Rahman (kabaddi) (born 1981), Bangladeshi kabaddi player
- Zia Ur Rehman (born 1981), Pakistani journalist
- Md. Ziaur Rahman (born 1952), Bangladeshi politician from Chapai Nawabganj
- Shah Mohammad Ziaur Rahman (born 1955), Chief of Staff of the Bangladesh Air Force
- Syed Ziaur Rahman (born 1972), Indian pharmacologist
- Qari Ziaur Rahman, Afghan reported to be Taliban leader
- Ziya-ur-Rahman Azmi, Indian author, scholar, professor
