= Shumaila =

Shammaila (Arabic/Persian/Urdu:شمائلہ) (IPA:ʃʊmaːʔɪləh) is an Arabic female name. Notable people with this name include:

- Shumaila Mushtaq, Pakistani cricketer
- Shumaila Qureshi, Pakistani cricketer
