= Moncef =

Moncef or Munsif (Arabic: منصف) is a masculine Arabic given name. Notable people with the name include:

== Given name ==
- Moncef Belkhayat (born 1970), Moroccan politician
- Moncef Guitouni (1939–2011), Tunisian psycho-sociologist
- Moncef Marzouki (born 1945), fourth President of Tunisia
- Moncef Ouichaoui (born 1977), Algerian footballer
- Moncef Slaoui (born 1959), American researcher
