= Talal Khalfan =

Omani footballer (born 1980)

Personal information
- Full name: Talal Khalfan Hadid Al-Farsi
- Date of birth: 25 November 1980 (age 45)
- Place of birth: Sur, Oman
- Height: 1.72 m (5 ft 8 in)
- Position: Midfielder

Youth career
- 1996–2000: Bowsher

Senior career*
Years	Team	Apps	(Gls)
2001–2005	Al-Oruba	?	(6)
2005–2008	Al-Arabi	?	(3)
2008	Muscat	?	(1)
2008	Al-Ittihad	?	(1)
2009	Najran	?	(1)
2009–2011	Al-Oruba	?	(0)
2011–2013	Al-Nahda	?	(1)

International career
1998–2010	Oman	18	(1)

Managerial career
- 2014–2016: Ja'lan (Technical Manager)
- * Club domestic league appearances and goals

Talal Khalfan Hadid Al-Farsi (Arabic: طلال خلفان حديد الفارسي; born 25 November 1980), commonly known as Talal Khalfan, is an Omani footballer who last played for Al-Nahda Club.

== Club career statistics ==
Club	Season	Division	League		Cup		Continental		Other		Total	
Club	Season	Division	Apps	Goals	Apps	Goals	Apps	Goals	Apps	Goals	Apps	Goals
Al-Oruba	2003–04	Omani League	-	1	-	1	0	0	-	0	-	2
Al-Oruba	2004–05	Omani League	-	5	-	0	0	0	-	0	-	5
Al-Oruba	Total		-	6	-	1	0	0	-	0	-	7
Al-Arabi	2005–06	Kuwaiti Premier League	-	3	-	3	0	0	-	0	-	6
Al-Arabi	Total		-	3	-	3	0	0	-	0	-	6
Muscat	2007–08	Omani League	-	1	-	0	0	0	-	0	-	1
Muscat	Total		-	1	-	0	0	0	-	0	-	1
Al-Ittihad	2008–09	Libyan Premier League	-	1	-	0	0	0	-	0	-	1
Al-Ittihad	Total		-	1	-	0	0	0	-	0	-	1
Najran	2008–09	Saudi Professional League	-	1	-	0	0	0	-	0	-	1
Najran	Total		-	1	-	0	0	0	-	0	-	1
Al-Oruba	2009–10	Omani League	-	0	-	1	0	0	-	0	-	1
Al-Oruba	Total		-	0	-	1	0	0	-	0	-	1
Al-Nahda	2011–12	Oman Elite League	-	1	-	0	0	0	-	0	-	1
Al-Nahda	Total		-	1	-	0	0	0	-	0	-	1
Career total			-	13	-	5	0	0	-	0	-	18

== International career ==
Talal was part of the first team squad of the Oman national football team till 2010. He was selected for the national team for the first time in 1996. He has made five appearances in the 2010 FIFA World Cup qualification.

== National team career statistics ==
=== Goals for Senior National Team ===
#	Date	Venue	Opponent	Score	Result	Competition
	19 March 2008	Muscat, Oman	United Arab Emirates	1–1	Draw	Friendly

== Honours ==
=== Club ===
- With Al-Oruba

- Omani League (2): 2001–02, 2008–09; Runner-up 2010–11
- Sultan Qaboos Cup (2): 2001, 2010
- Omani Super Cup (2): 2002, 2011

- With Al-Arabi

- Kuwait Emir Cup (3): 2005, 2006, 2008
- Kuwait Crown Prince Cup (1): 2007
- Kuwait Super Cup (1): 2008

- With Al-Ittihad

- Libyan Premier League (2): 2007–08, 2008–09
- Libyan Super Cup (1): 2008 Libyan Super Cup

- With Al-Nahda

- Sultan Qaboos Cup (0): Runner-up 2012
