= Yusha (given name) =

Male given name

- Pronunciation: YOO-shə
- Gender: male
- Language: Arabic, Hebrew

Origin
- Origin: Joshua (Hebrew: יְהוֹשֻׁעַ Yĕhôshúa or Hebrew: יֵשׁוּעַ)
- Meaning: God is salvation; hero; brave
- Region of origin: Arab world, Muslim world

Other names
- Alternative spelling: Yoosha, Yousha

Yusha (Arabic: يوشع Yūshaʾ) or Yushān is a masculine given name, the Arabic form of Joshua which is of Hebrew origin, meaning "God is salvation".

== Prophet Yusha ==
Although Yūshaʾ is not mentioned by name in the Quran, there are references made to him in two places.

قَالَ رَجُلَانِ مِنَ الَّذِينَ يَخَافُونَ أَنْعَمَ اللّهُ عَلَيْهِمَا

Two men of those who feared (God and) on whom God had bestowed His grace said...,

When the Children of Israel declined to obey God and follow His Messenger Musa, two righteous men among them, on whom God had bestowed a great bounty and who were afraid of God and His punishment, encouraged them to go forward.

It was also said that the Ayah reads in a way that means that these men were respected and honored by their people. Ibn Abbas, Mujahid, Ikrimah, Atiyah, As-Suddi, Ar-Rabi` bin Anas and several other Salaf and latter scholars stated that;

These two men were Yusha`, the son of Nun, and Kalib, the son of Yufna.

These two men said to their people,

ادْخُلُواْ عَلَيْهِمُ الْبَابَ فَإِذَا دَخَلْتُمُوهُ فَإِنَّكُمْ غَالِبُونَ وَعَلَى اللّهِ فَتَوَكَّلُواْ إِن كُنتُم مُّوْمِنِينَ

"Surprise them through the gate, for when you are in, victory will be yours. And put your trust in God if you are believers indeed."

Therefore, they said, if you rely on and trust in God, follow His command and obey His Messenger, then God will give you victory over your enemies and will give you triumph and dominance over them. Thus, you will conquer the city that God has promised you.

== See also ==
- Al-Nabi Yusha', a small Palestinian village
