= Abbad =

Abbad is an Islamic name of Arabic origin meaning "best worshipper". People with this name include:

- Abbad ibn Bishr (c. 597–632), a companion of Muhammad
- Abbad ibn Ziyad (d. 718), son of Ziyad ibn Abih and governor of Sistan for Caliph Muawiyah I
- Abbad I or Abu al-Qasim Muhammad ibn Abbad (ruled from 1023 and died in 1042), founder of the Abbadid dynasty in Seville
- Abbad II, Abbad II al-Mu'tadid or Abu Amr Abbad (ruled from 1042 and died in 1069), second ruler of the Abbadid dynasty in Seville
- Abbad III or Al-Mu'tamid ibn Abbad (1040–1095), poet and third and last ruler of the Abbadid dynasty in Seville
- Ibn Abbad al-Rundi (1333–1390), Sufi theologian active in Morocco
- Fray Íñigo Abbad y Lasierra

(1745–1813), Spanish Benedictine monk and historian of Puerto Rico
