= Soha (given name) =

Suha or Soha (Arabic: suhā, suhâ سُهى; written variant سُها) is an Arabic female given name literal meaning is baby or "a certain star of a constellation which is transparent, hidden or invisible, It is also called as a star came from heaven ". However, the name also bears the meaning of "young star" or "moon(s) or satellite(s)", "hidden planet or star obscured by the view, overlooked, oversight or neglected".

It is also the name of the star Alcor called "Suha (al-Suhā, as-Suhā السُّهَا)" but bears the meaning "forgotten, neglected, overlooked, distracted". There is an Arab saying possibly related to the name of the star: "aray-hā 's-suhā wa-turī-nī 'l-Qamar (أريها السها وتريني القمر)" meaning "show her as-Suhā (the constellation Alcor) and show me the moon", the correlation to the name of the star used as a metaphor is that "a person beaten by someone who asks about something but was given a distant answer".

== People with the given name Soha or Suha ==
- Soha Abed Elaal (born 1973), Egyptian athlete
- Soha Ali Khan (born 1978), Indian actress
- Soha Bechara (born 1967), Lebanese nationalist
- Soha Hassoun, American computer scientist
- Suha Arafat (born 1963), Former Palestinian Authority President Yasser Arafat's wife
- Suha Soni (born 1996), Indian origin cardiovascular researcher and physician

== See also ==
- for articles on persons with this first name
- for articles on persons with this first name
