= Rashida Riffat =

Pakistani politician

Rashida Riffat MPA

Member of the Provincial Assembly of Khyber Pakhtunkhwa
- Incumbent
- Assumed office 29 May 2013
- Constituency: Reserved seat for women

Personal details
- Party: Jamaat-e-Islami Pakistan

Rashida Riffat (Urdu: راشدہ رفعت) is a Pakistani politician who has been a Member of the Provincial Assembly of Khyber Pakhtunkhwa since May 2013.

== Education ==
Riffat has graduated in Journalism.

== Political career ==
She was elected to the Provincial Assembly of Khyber Pakhtunkhwa as a candidate of Jamaat-e-Islami Pakistan on a reserved seat for women in the 2013 Pakistani general election.

In September 2013, she was appointed as parliamentary secretary in Khyber Pakhtunkhwa Assembly without a department until she was discharged in November 2013.

In May 2016, she joined a resolution to establish a Women's Caucus in the Provincial Assembly of Khyber Pakhtunkhwa. She also joined a resolution to declare 8 July as Charity Day in honour of Abdul Sattar Edhi.
