= Muhammad (name) =

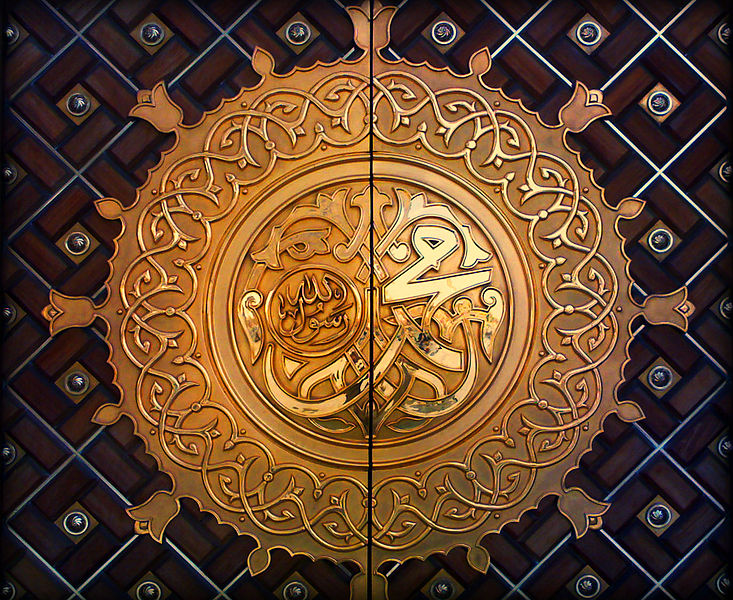
- "Muhammad the Messenger of God", inscribed on the gates of the mosque al-Masjid an-Nabawi
- Pronunciation: /moʊˈhæməd/; /moʊˈhɑːməd/; /muːˈhæməd/; /muːˈhɑːməd/; /moʊˈhæmɛd/; /moʊˈhɑːmɛd/; /məˈhæməd/; /məˈhæmɪd/; Arabic: [muˈħam.mad], [mʊˈħæm.mæd]; Egyptian Arabic: [mæˈħæm.mæd]; Persian: [mohæmˈmæd]; Turkish: [muˈham.med]; Urdu: [mʊˈhəm.məd]; Kurdish: [mɪˈhɛm.mɛd], Tatar: [mø̞ˈχæm.mæt]
- Gender: Male

Origin
- Origin: Arabic
- Meaning: "praiseworthy"
- Region of origin: Arabia

Other names
- Alternative spelling: Moohammed, Mahmad, Mahammad, Mahammed, Muhammadu, Mahamed, Mohamad, Mohamed, Mohammad, Mohammed, Muhamad, Muhamed, Muhammed, Muhammet, Muhummud, Mahammud, Mohd. Muh., Mochamad, Mohamud, Mokhmad, Mukhammad, Md., Mu., Mo., M., Mohammad, Muhammad,

Muhammad (Arabic: مُحَمَّد, romanized: Muḥammad) is an Arabic given male name meaning "praiseworthy". The name comes from the passive participle of the Arabic verb ḥammada (حَمَّدَ), meaning "to praise", which itself comes from the triconsonantal Semitic root Ḥ-M-D. Other spellings of the name include Muhammed, Muhamad, Mohammad, Mohammed, Mamed, Mohand, Mahammad, Mohand, Maxamed, Mehemmed, Mehemmet, Mohamad, Mohamed, Mehmed/Mehmet, Memet, Mamadou, Magomed, and a variety of other ways. Believed to be the most popular name in the world, by July 2014 it was estimated to have been given to 150 million men and boys.

The name has been banned for newborn children in the Xinjiang region of China since 2017, as well as for the Ahmadi community in Pakistan.

== Lexicology ==
The name Muḥammad is the standard, primary transliteration of the Arabic given name, محمد, that comes from the Arabic passive participle of ḥammada (حَمَّدَ), praise, and further from triconsonantal Semitic root Ḥ-M-D (praise); hence praised, or praiseworthy. However, its actual pronunciation differs colloquially, for example, in Egyptian Arabic: IPA: [mæˈħæmːæd], while in exclusively religious contexts, talking about Islam: IPA: [moˈħæmːæd].

The name has one of the highest numbers of English spelling variants in the world. Other Arabic names from the same root include Mahmud, Ahmed, Hamed, Tahmid, and Hamid.

The name may be abbreviated to Md., Mohd., Muhd., Mhd., or simply M.

== Statistics ==
According to the sixth edition of The Columbia Encyclopedia (2000), Muhammad is probably the most common given name in the world, including variations. The Independent reported in 2014 that more than 150 million men and boys in the world bear the name Muhammad, which would make it the most popular name in the world. Approximately 60% of people named Muhammad live in Middle East, North Africa and Pakistan.

In 2024, the Office for National Statistics, which represents England and Wales collectively, reported that the name Muhammad was the most popular baby name for boys in that region in 2023.

Mohammed and Mohamed were the most popular baby name in Département Seine-Saint-Denis (2002, 2008) and in Marseille (2007, 2009), France. Similarly, since 2008 it has been the most popular baby boy name in Brussels and Antwerp, Belgium's most Muslim-populated cities.

In May 2006, it was reported that statistics indicate that some 8,928 Danish Muslims carry the name Muhammad and that in 2004 alone, 167 new-born babies were registered.

In 2009, Muhammad, the most common spelling variant, was ranked 430th in the US. According to the Social Security Administration, Mohammad was ranked 589th, Mohammed 633rd, and Muhammad the 639th most popular first name for newborns in 2006. In the 1990 United States census, the Muhammad variant of the spelling was ranked 4,194 out of 88,799 for people of all ages.

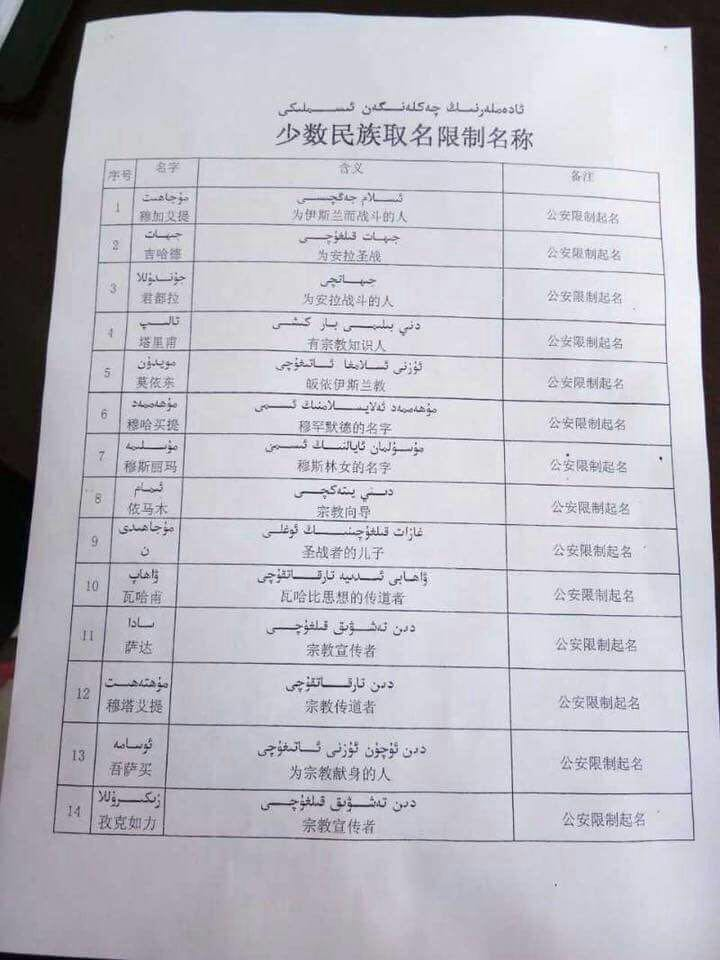
Part of the list of officially banned names in Xinjiang that was announced in 2017. China prohibits parents of the ethnic Uighur minority from giving their newborn children names such as Mohammed or names that the Chinese authorities consider to have "extremely religious" meaning.

In April 2017, the Chinese government prohibited parents from choosing the name Muhammad as the given name for a child. The list included more than two dozen names and was targeted at the 10 million Uighurs in the western region of Xinjiang.

If all variants of Muhammad are counted, there are 15,723 people in Finland named Muhammad, accounting for 0.7% of the Finnish male population. The most common spelling is Mohamed, accounting for 38% of the Muhammad name carriers.

In 2022, it was the 35th most popular name given to boys in Canada.

== Given name ==
=== Mochamad ===
- Mochamad Ridwan Kamil (born 1971), Indonesian architect and politician
- Mochamad Basuki Hadimuljono (born 1954), Indonesian bureaucrat

=== Mochammad ===
- Mochammad Al Amin Syukur Fisabillah (born 1994), Indonesian football player
- Mochammad Sanoesi (1935–2008), Indonesian police general

=== Mohamad ===
- Mohamad Ashiek Salleh, Singaporean convicted killer
- Mohamad Aziz (1940–2020), Malaysian politician
- Mohamad Bazzi (born 1975), Lebanese-American award-winning journalist
- Mohamad Jawad Chirri (1905–1994), American imam
- Mohamad Elzahabi, Lebanese militant
- Mohamad Haidar (born 1989), Lebanese footballer
- Mohamad Nor Ismail (born 1982), Malaysian footballer
- Mohamad Kasebi (1951–2025), Iranian actor and film director
- Mohamad Jalal Kdouh (born 1997), Lebanese footballer
- Mohamad Tavakoli-Targhi (born 1957), Iranian-born Canadian scholar, editor, author, professor
- Mohamad Zbida (born 1990), Syrian footballer

=== Mohamed ===
- Mohamed Abdelaziz (1947–2016), president of the Sahrawi Arab Democratic Republic (Western Sahara) from 1982 until his death in 2016
- Mohamed Abdukani (born 1979), Somalia-born Swedish politician
- Mohamed Abdullahi Mohamed (born 1962), President of Somalia from 2007 to 2022
- Mohamed Aboelgheit (1988–2022), Egyptian investigative journalist
- Mohamed Aboussalam (born 1996), Moroccan basketball player
- Mohamed Amine Amami (born 1983), Tunisian footballer
- Moustafa Ahmed Mohamed Hassan Amar (born 1966), Egyptian musician and actor
- Mohamed Amsif (born 1989), Moroccan footballer
- Mohamed Anwar el-Sadat (1918–1981), Egyptian politician and President from 1970 to 1981
- Mohamed Anwar Esmat Sadat (born 1955), Egyptian politician and nephew of former Egyptian President Mohamed Anwar el-Sadat
- Mohamed Abu Arisha (born 1997), Israeli basketball player for Hapoel Be'er Sheva of the Israeli Basketball Premier League and the Israeli national basketball team
- Mohamed Atta (1968–2001), Egyptian Islamist terrorist and ringleader of the hijackers of American Airlines Flight 11 in the September 11 attacks
- Mohamed Bah (died 2012), African man who was shot dead by police officers
- Mohamed Bahi (born 1983/1984), American-Algerian former Chief Liaison of New York City Mayor Eric Adams to the Muslim community
- Mohamed Bairouti (born 1976), Syrian footballer
- Mohamed ElBaradei (born 1942), Director General of the United Nations International Atomic Energy Agency
- Mohamed Siad Barre (1919/1921?–1995), President of Somalia from 1969 to 1991
- Mohamed Choua, Moroccan basketball player
- Mohamed Diab (born 1978), Egyptian director and screenwriter
- Mohamed Diaby (born 1990), Ivorian footballer
- Mohamed Diaby (footballer, born 1996), French footballer
- Mohamed Diamé (born 1987), French-Senegalese footballer
- Mohamed Diarra (born 2001), college basketball player
- Mohamed Emam (born 1984), Egyptian actor
- Mohamed Elsayed (born 1973), Egyptian boxer
- Mohamed Fadl, Egyptian footballer
- Mohamed Farah, British Somali runner
- Mohamed Fakhir (born 1953), Moroccan footballer
- Mohamed al-Fayed (1929–2023), Egyptian-born, British-based multi-millionaire
- Mohamed Fayez (born 1989), Emirati footballer
- Mohamed Hamri (1932–2000), Moroccan painter
- Mohamed Harbi (1933–2026), Algerian historian
- Mohamed Fouad Abd El Hamid Hassan (born 1961), Egyptian musician
- Mohamed Henedi (born 1965), Egyptian comedy actor
- Mohamed Ibrahim (disambiguation), multiple people
- Mohamed Kamal Fadel, Polisario Front diplomatic
- Mohamed Kouradji (1952–2020), Algerian football referee
- Mohamed Koussi (born 1994), Moroccan hurdler
- Mohamed Osman Jawari (1945–2024), Somalia attorney and politician
- Mohamed Osman Mohamud, Somali-born terrorist who nearly set off a bomb in Oregon
- Mohamed Mrsal (born 1978), Libyan basketball player
- Mohamed Namiz, Sri Lankan cricketer
- Mohamed Niang (born 1976), Senegalese basketball player
- Mohamed Nur, Mayor of Mogadishu
- Mohamed Ofkir (born 1996), Norwegian footballer
- Mohamed Salah (born 1992), Egyptian footballer
- Mohamed Salama Badi (born 1966), Sahrawi ambassador to East Timor
- Mohamed Salem (footballer, born 1940) (1940–2008), Algerian footballer
- Mohamed Salem (footballer, born 1994), Egyptian footballer
- Mohamed al-Shehhi (born 1988), Emirati footballer
- Mohamed Sissoko (born 1985), Malian footballer
- Mohamed El-Tabii (1896–1976), Egyptian journalist
- Mohamed Touré (disambiguation), several people with this name
- Mohamed El Yaagoubi (born 1977), Moroccan footballer
- Mohamed Yehia Zakaria (born 1938), Emirati of Egyptian origin pioneer of the beverage industry in the Arab world
- Mohamed Youssef (basketball) (born 1986), Libyan basketball player
- Mohamed Zein Tahan (born 1988), Lebanese footballer
- Mohamed Zidan (born 1981), Egyptian footballer
- Mohamed II of the Maldives, Sultan of the Maldives

=== Mohammad ===
- Arif Mohammad Khan (born 1951), Indian politician and current governor of Kerala
- Askia Mohammad Benkan, ruled the Songhai Empire from 1531 to 1537
- Askia Mohammad I (c. 1442–1538), king of the Songhai Empire (1493–1528)
- Kazem Mohammad (born 1938), Iranian biostatistician and academic
- Mohammad Abdul Hamid, President of Bangladesh from 2013 to 2023
- Mohammad Ahsan, Indonesian badminton player
- Mohammad Ali Jauhar, Indian politician
- Mohammad Amin Fatemi, Afghan physician
- Mohammad Asghar (1945–2020), Welsh politician
- Mohammad Ashraful (born 1984), Bangladeshi cricketer
- Mohammad Azharuddin, Indian former cricket captain
- Mohammad Azizi, Iranian footballer
- Mohammad Bakri (1953–2025), Palestinian actor and film director
- Mohammad Barghouti, Palestinian politician
- Mohammad Bhar (c. 2000–2024), Palestinian mentally disabled man
- Mohammad Dawran, Afghan military personnel
- Mohammad Farid, Egyptian political figure
- Mohammad Hashim, Iraqi politician
- Mohammad Hatta, first Vice President of Indonesia
- Mohammad Hejazi (1956–2021), Iranian general
- Mohammad Hisham Mahmoud Mohammad Abbas (1963–), Egyptian musician
- Mohammad Hossein Shahriar (1906–1988), Iranian poet, writing in Persian and Azerbaijani
- Mohammad Hussain (disambiguation), multiple people
- Mohammad Ibrahim (disambiguation), multiple people
- Mohammad Jasmir Ansari, Indian politician
- Mohammad Kaif (1980–), Indian cricketer
- Mohammad Khadem (1935–2020), Iranian wrestler
- Mohammad Khatami (born 1943), the President of Iran, 1997 to 2005
- Mohammad Mahseiri (died 2013), Jordanian politician
- Mohammad Mokri, Kurdish scholar
- Mohammad Najib Abdul Razak, Malaysian Prime Minister
- Mohammad Najibullah (1947–1996), President of Afghanistan from 1987 to 1992. He was assassinated in 1996
- Mohammad Nami, Saudi footballer
- Mohammad Navazi, Iranian footballer
- Mohammad Nazir, Pakistani cricketer
- Mohammad Yousuf (disambiguation), multiple people
- Mohammad Oraz (1969–2003), Kurdish mountain climber
- Mohammad Panjali (born 1955), Iranian footballer
- Mohammad Rafique (born 1970), Bangladeshi cricketer
- Mohammad Reza Sharifinia (born 1955), Iranian actor and film director
- Mohammad Reza Shah Pahlavi as the last Shah of Iran
- Mohammad Reza Tabasi, Iranian scholar
- Mohammad Reza Tabesh (born 1956), Iranian politician
- Mohammad Reza Tafazzoli (born 1974), Iranian composer
- Mohammad Reza Tahmasebi (born 1976), Iranian retired Football player
- Mohammad Reza Tayebi (born 1997), Iranian track and field athlete
- Mohammad Reza Tupchi (born 1963), Iranian wrestler
- Mohammad Rona (born 1985), Afghan-born Danish politician
- Mohammad Sadli (1922–2008), Indonesian politician
- Mohammad Saleh (born 1946), second Deputy Chief Justice of the Supreme Court Indonesia for judicial affairs
- Mohammad Yusuf Siddiq (born 1957), Bangladeshi epigraphist
- Mohammad Sidique Khan (1974–2005), English suicide bomber in the 7/7 attacks
- Mohammad Taghi Bahar (1886–1951), Iranian poet, politician, mathematician, logician, journalist, essayist, and historian
- Mohammad Toaha, Bangladeshi politician
- Mohammad Ali Varasteh (1896–1989), Iranian statesman
- Mohammad Va'ez Abaee-Khorasani (1940?–2004), Iranian cleric and reformist politician
- Mohammad Yousuf (born 1974), Pakistan Test cricketer
- Mohammad Abubakar Durrani, Pakistani canoeist and filmmaker
- Mohammad Ridzwan bin Samad, a convicted rioter and gang member of Salakau in Singapore.
- Mohammad Fahmi bin Abdul Shukor, a convicted rioter and gang member of Salakau in Singapore.
- Mohammad-Ali Abtahi (born 1960), Iranian theologian and scholar
- Mohammad Ali Ale-Hashem (1962–2024), Iranian jurist and Twelver Shia cleric
- Mohammad-Ali Angaji, Iranian Shia cleric and politician
- Mohammad Ali Araki (1894–1994), Iranian Twelver Shia Marja
- Mohammad Ali Faiz Lahiji Gilani
- Mohammad Ali Gerami Qomi
- Mohammad Alavi Gorgani
- Mohammad Ali Esmaeelpoor Ghomsheie
- Mohammad Ali Nekounam
- Mohammad Ali Mousavi Jazayeri
- Mohammad Ali Movahed Abtahi
- Ali Movahedi-Kermani
- Mohammad Ali Qazi Tabatabaei
- Mohammad-Ali Rahmani
- Mohammad Ali Rezaei
- Mohammad-Ali Shahidi
- Mohammad Ali Shomali
- Mohammad-Ali Taskhiri
- Mohammad Amin Khorasani
- Mohammed Bahrami Khoshkar
- Mohammad-Bagher Bagheri
- Mohammad Baqir Ebadi
- Mohammad Bagher Kharazi
- Mohammad Baqir Mohammadi La’ini
- Mohammed Emami-Kashani
- Mohammad Faqih
- Mohammad Fazel Lankarani
- Mohammad Feyz Sarabi
- Mohammad Hadi Abdekhodai
- Mohammad Hadi Ghazanfari Khansari
- Mohammad Haji Abu al-Qasem Doulabi
- Mohammad Hashemian
- Mohammad-Hassan Aboutorabi Fard
- Mohammad Hassan Ahmadi Faqih
- Mohammad Hassan Mar’ashi
- Mohammad Hassan Ghadrdan Gharamaleki
- Mohammad Hassan Rahimian
- Mohammad Hassan Zali
- Mohammad Hussayn Ahmadi Shahroudi
- Mohammad Beheshti
- Mohammad Hussayn Hussaynzadeh Bahraini
- Mohammad Hussayni Rouhani Qomi
- Mohammad Hussaini Shahroudi
- Mohammad Hussayni Shahroudi
- Mohammad al-Shirazi
- Seyyed Mohammad Hosseini Zanjani
- Muhammad Husayn Tabatabai
- Mohammad Hussayn Zarandi
- Mohammad Ibadizadeh
- Mohammad Ebrahim Jannaati
- Mohammad Ezodin Hosseini Zanjani
- Mohammad Jafar Montazeri
- Mohammad-Javad Bahonar
- Mohammad Javad Pishvai
- Mohammed Kadhim al-Modarresi
- Mohammad Kazem Shariatmadari
- Mohammad Khamenei
- Mohammad Khatami
- Mohammad Mahdi Hussayni Hamedani
- Mohammad Mahdi Mir Baqeri
- Mohammad Mahdi Pourfatimi
- Mohammad Mahdi Rabbani Amlishi
- Mohammad Mofatteh
- Mohammad Mohad
- Mohammad Mohammadi Gilani
- Mohammad Momen
- Mohammad Mousavi Khoeiniha
- Mohammad Mofti al-shia Mousavi
- Mohammad Naqi Shahrokhi Khorramabadi
- Nasser Biria
- Mohammad Qomi
- Mohammad Rahmati Sirjani
- Mohammad Rajaei Baghsiai
- Mohammad Reyshahri
- Mohammad Reza Abbasi Fard
- Mohammed Ridha al-Sistani
- Mohammad-Reza Ashtiani Araghi
- Mohammad Reza Baqeri Bonabi
- Mohammad Reza Faker
- Mohammad-Reza Golpaygani
- Mohammad-Reza Mahdavi Kani
- Mohammad Reza Meghari Moruji
- Mohammad Reza Mirtajodini
- Mohammad-Reza Modarresi Yazdi
- Mohammad Reza Naseri Yazdi
- Mohammad Reza Nekoonam
- Mohammad-Reza Tavassoli
- Sadegh Khalkhali
- Mohammad Sadeq Rouhani
- Mohammad-Sadegh Salehimanesh
- Mohammad Sadeqi Tehrani
- Mohammad Sadoughi
- Seyyed Mohammad Saeedi
- Mohammad Safari Malikmian
- Mohammad Shahcheraghi
- Mohammad-Taher Shubayr al-Khaqani
- Mohammad Taqi al-Modarresi
- Mohammad Taqi al-Khoei
- Mohammad-Taqi Bahjat Foumani
- Mohammad Taghi Falsafi
- Mohammad-Taqi Ja'fari
- Mohammad Al Gaylordo
- Mohammad-Taghi Khalaji
- Mohammad El Sabesito
- Mohammad Sabehsson
- Mohammad-Taqi Mesbah-Yazdi
- Mohammed Taqi Morvarid
- Mohammad Taqi Naqd Ali
- Mohammad Taghi Pourmohammadi
- Mohammad Taqi Rahbar
- Mohammad-Taqi Shoushtari
- Mohammad Taghi Vaezi
- Mohammad Vaez Mousavi
- Mohammad Yasrebi
- Mohammad Yazdi
- Seyyed Mohammad Ziaabadi

=== Mohammed ===
- Mohammed Abequa, Jordanian kidnapper and murderer
- Mohammed Afroz, Indian juvenile rapist and murderer who was one of the culprits of the 2012 Delhi gang rape and murder
- Mohammed Ahmed (businessperson), Ethiopian businessman
- Mohammed Ajeeb (born 1938), British politician
- Mohammed Ammouri (died 2004), murder victim
- Mohammed Amer, Palestinian-American stand-up comedian
- Mohammed Anas (born 1994), Ghanaian footballer
- Mohammed Al Aqib, Qatari footballer
- Mohammed Ashi, Saudi Arabian fashion designer
- Mohammed Assaf (born 1990), Libyan-born Palestinian singer
- Mohammed Atef (1944–2001), Egyptian al-Qaeda chief
- Mohammed Awad (politician), Iraqi politician
- Mohammed Ayade (born 1999), Iraqi para-athlete
- Mohammed bin Salman, crown prince and prime minister of Saudi Arabia
- Mohammed Boujassoum (1948–2025), Qatari actor
- Mohammed Bouyeri, Moroccan-Dutch Islamic terrorist
- Mohammed El-Bakkar (born 1959), Lebanese tenor
- Mohammed Dib (1920–2003), probably Algeria's most prolific and well-known writer
- Mohammed Emwazi, ISIL member
- Mohammed Dwedar (born 2001), Palestinian runner
- Mohammed Fahim, former Afghan vice-president
- Mohammed George (born 1982), British actor
- Sayed Mohammed Baqir al-Hakim (1939–2003), assassinated Iraqi Shia
- Mohammed Saeed Harib, United Arab Emirati animator
- Mohammed Hussain, Indian field hockey player
- Mohammed Ali bin Johari (1976–2008), Singaporean convicted murderer
- Mohammed Abed al-Jabri (1935–2010), Moroccan writer
- Mohammed Al-Kandari (born 1971), Kuwaiti politician
- Mohammed Kumalia, Nigerian politician
- Mohammed Makhlouf, Syrian businessman
- Mohammed Manga (1977–2019), Senegalese football player
- Mohammed Al-Marwani (born 1989), Saudi Arabian basketball player
- Mohammed III of Morocco, former King of Morocco
- Mohammed IV of Morocco, former King of Morocco
- Mohammed V of Morocco, former King of Morocco
- Mohammed VI of Morocco (1963–), King of Morocco from 1999
- Mohammed Mossadegh (1882–1967), Prime Minister of Iran from 1951–1953
- Mohammed Msaad (born 2004), Moroccan steeplechase runner
- Mohammed Said Nabulsi (1928–2013), Jordanian banker, economist and politician
- Mohammed Omar (1959–), Afghanistan's Talibani de facto Head of State from 1996–2001
- Mohammad Reza Shah Pahlavi (1919–1980), the second and last Shah of Iran, ruling from 1941 until 1979
- Mohammed al-Qahtani, Saudi Arabian held at Guantanamo Bay thought to be a 20th hijacker suspect
- Mohammed Rafi (1924–1980), Indian Bollywood playback singer
- Mohammed Al-Salhi (born 1986), Saudi Arabian middle-distance runner
- Mohammed Adil Shah (1627–1656), Sultan of Bijapur
- Mohammed Shahabuddin, President of Bangladesh since 2023
- Mohammed Nadir Shah (1880–1933), King of Afghanistan from 1929 until his assassination in 1933
- Mohammed Zahir Shah (1914–2007), the last King of Afghanistan from 1933 to 1973
- Mohammed Racim (1896–1975), Algerian artist
- Mohammed Sheikh (born 1973), English cricketer
- Mohammed Timoumi (born 1960), Moroccan footballer
- Mohammed Haydar Zammar (born 1961), German al-Qaeda recruiter
- Mohammed Irfan (born 1985), Indian playback singer
- Mohammed Shami (born 1984), Indian cricketer
- Mohammed Seisay (born 1990), American football player
- Mohammed Abdur Rahiman (1898–1945), Indian politician
- Mohammed Naseeb Qureshy (1933–2005), Indian geologist
- Mohammed bin Nawwaf bin Abdulaziz, Saudi Arabia's Ambassador to the United Kingdom
- Mohammed bin Faisal Al Saud (1937–2017), Saudi businessman
- Mohammed Vizarat Rasool Khan (1946–2013), Indian educationist and politician
- Mohammed bin Rashid al Maktoum, Vice President and Prime Minister of the United Arab Emirates (UAE), and ruler of the Emirate of Dubai
- Mohammed Siraj (born 1994), Indian cricketer
- Major General Mohammed Amin Naik, a former Indian Army officer
- Mohammed Shahid (1960–2016), former Indian field-hockey player
- Mohammed Namadi Sambo (born 1954), Vice President of Nigeria from 2010 to 2015

=== Muhamad ===
- Muhamad Ali Aman, Southeast Asian politician
- Muhamad Salih Dilan, Kurdish poet
- Muhamad Radhi Mat Din (born 1965), Malaysian football assistant coach
- Muhamad Khalid Jamlus (born 1977), Malaysian footballer
- Muhamad Husain Kadir, Iraqi prisoner
- Muhamad Kanan (born 1955), Israeli Arab politician
- Muhamad Aly Rifai, Arab American internist and psychiatrist
- Muhamad Hasik bin Sahar, Singaporean gang member and convicted killer serving life imprisonment in Singapore

=== Muhamed ===
- Muhamed Alaim (born 1981), Bosnian football goalkeeper
- Muhamed Bešić (born 1992), Bosnian football midfielder
- Muhamed Haneef (born 1979), Indian physician
- Muhamed Keita (born 1990), Norwegian football striker
- Muhamed Zulić (1928–2008), Croatian politician

=== Muhammad ===
- Muhammad (570–8 June 632), Arab religious, social, and political leader and central figure of the world religion of Islam.
- Muhammad ibn Maslamah (588 or 591–665), an Arab knight and companion of the Islamic prophet Muhammad. He was known as "The Knight of Allah's Prophet"
- Muhammad ibn al-Hanafiyya (637–700), an Alid political and religious leader, and also the third son of caliph Ali
- Muhammad ibn Marwan, an Umayyad prince and general of the Caliphate in the period 690–710
- Muhammad ibn Abd al-Malik ibn Marwan was an Umayyad prince, the son of Caliph Abd al-Malik (r. 685–705), who played important role in the politics of the Umayyad Caliphate
- Muhammad ibn al-Walid was an Umayyad Prince and son of Caliph Al-Walid I who ruled from October 705 to 715.
- Muhammad ibn Sulayman ibn Abd al-Malik, an Umayyad Prince and son of seventh Umayyad Caliph Sulayman ibn Abd al-Malik
- Muhammad ibn Yazid ibn Abd al-Malik an Umayyad Prince and son of the ninth Umayyad Caliph Yazid II.
- Muhammad ibn Abdullah ibn Muhammad known by his regnal title al-Mahdi, was the third Abbasid Caliph and ruled from 6 October 775 to 24 July 785
- Abu Muhammad Musa (died 786), an Abbasid caliph, better known by his regnal name Al-Hadi.
- Muhammad ibn Harun al-Rashid, known by his regnal title al-Amin, was the sixth Abbasid Caliph and ruled from 24 March 809 to 27 September 813
- Muhammad ibn Harun al-Rashid, known by his regnal title Al-Mu'tasim, was the eighth Abbasid Caliph and ruled from 9 August 833 to 5 January 842
- Abu Isa Muhammad, a son of Harun al-Rashid and Irbah
- Abu Yaqub Muhammad, a son of Harun al-Rashid
- Abu Sulayman Muhammad, a son of Abbasid caliph Harun al-Rashid
- Abu Ali Muhammad, a son of caliph Harun al-Rashid
- Abu Ahmad Muhammad, a son of caliph Harun al-Rashid
- Muhammad ibn al-Mu'tasim was an Abbasid Prince and father of the 12th Abbasid Caliph al-Musta'in who ruled from 8 June 862 to 17 October 866
- Muhammad ibn Ja'far known by his regnal title Al-Muntasir, was the 11th Abbasid Caliph. He ruled from 11 December 861 – 7 June 862
- Muhammad ibn Ja'far al-Mutawakkil, known by his regnal title Al-Mu'tazz, was the 13th Abbasid Caliph. He ruled from 866 to 13 July 869
- Muhammad ibn Harun al-Wathiq, known by his regnal title Al-Muhtadi, was the 14th Abbasid Caliph. He ruled from 869 to 21 June 870
- Muhammad ibn Al-Muktafi, an Abbasid Prince and son of Caliph al-Muktafi
- Muhammad ibn Ahmad al-Mu'tadid, known by his regnal title Al-Qahir, was the 19th Abbasid Caliph. He ruled from 932 to 934
- Muhammad ibn al-Mustakfi, 10th-century Abbasid prince, son of the Abbasid caliph al-Mustakfi (r. 944–946)
- Muhammad ibn al-Qadir, also known as al-Ghalib, was the 11th-century Abbasid prince
- Muhammad ibn al-Qa'im, 11th-century Abbasid prince and father of caliph Al-Muqtadi (r. 1075–1094)
- Muḥammad ibn ʿAlī aṭ-Ṭāʾī (1165–1240), Arab mystic, poet, and philosopher
- Muḥammad Ibn ʾAḥmad Ibn Rušd (1126–1198), Arab philosopher
- Muhammad Aladdin, Egyptian leading novelist
- Muhammad Mahmood Alam (1935–2013), Pakistani fighter pilot
- Muhammad Ma Jian (1906–1978), Chinese Muslim Confucian and Islamic scholar
- Muhammad Nur Aziz Wardana (born 1994), Indonesian basketball player
- Muhammad Osamanmusa (born 1998), Thai futsal player
- Muhammad Rahul (born 1995), Indonesian politician
- Muhammad Sean Ricardo Gelael (born 1996), Indonesian racing driver
- Muhammad Amin Bughra Emir of the First East Turkestan Republic
- Muhammad Ali (1942–2016), American heavyweight boxing champion
- Syed Muhammad Naquib al-Attas (1931–), Malaysian philosopher
- Muhammad ibn Abu Bakr (631–658), Son of Abu Bakr, raised by Ali
- Muhammad bin Nayef (1959–), Crown Prince of Saudi Arabia
- Muhammad al-Baqir 676–743 Shī‘ah Imām
- Muhammad Baqir Majlisi a very powerful Iranian Twelver Shi'a cleric, during the Safavid era.
- Muhammad Ali Bogra (1909–1963), Prime Minister of Pakistan from 1953–1955
- Muhammad of Ghor (1162–1206), Persian conqueror and sultan between 1171 and 1206
- Muhammad Ali Jinnah (1876–1948), born into British India, helped found Pakistan, acting as its Governor-General
- Muhammad Zia-ul-Haq (1924–1988), ruled Pakistan from 1977 to 1988 under martial law
- Muhammad Iqbal (1877–1938), poet born into the British Raj, considered one of the founding fathers of Pakistan
- Muhammad El-Amin (born 1987), American professional basketball player
- Muhammad al-Qayyim al-Jawziyya (?–1350), Sunni Islamic scholar
- Muhammad Naeem Noor Khan, Pakistani al-Qaeda operative
- Muhammad ibn Musa al-Khwarizmi (~780–~850), Persian mathematician
- Sultan Muhammad of Khwarezmia (?–1220), last ruler of Khwarezmia
- Muhammad al-Mahdi (869–?), Last Twelver Shī‘ah Imām
- Muhammad ibn Maslama (589–666)
- Muhammad Ibn Qasim (al-Alawi), Arab fugitive
- Muhammad Mumith Ahmed (born 1984), British-Bangladeshi singer-songwriter and producer
- Muhammad Naguib (1901–1984), first President of Egypt, in 1953
- Muhammad Ali Pasha (1769–1849), viceroy of Egypt, sometimes considered the founder of modern Egypt
- Muhammad Tahir-ul-Qadri (1947–), Muslim scholar, professor, poet and politician
- Dwight Muhammad Qawi (1953–), former world boxing champion
- Muhammad ibn Zakariya al-Razi (865–925), Alchemist, physician, and philosopher
- Jalal al-Din Muhammad Rumi (1207–1273), Persian poet and Sufi mystic from Balkh, now in Afghanistan
- Muhammad Suheimat (1916–1968), Jordanian military general and a statesman
- Muhammad Nawaz Sharif, Prime Minister of Pakistan 1990–1999, 2013–2017
- Muhammad ibn Talha, son of the prominent Muslim general Talha ibn Ubayd-Allah
- Muhammad al-Taqi (811–835), Twelver Shī‘ah Imām
- Muhammad ibn Tughj al-Ikhshid (882–946), autonomous ruler of Egypt 935–946, founder of the Ikhshidid dynasty
- Muhammad Rafiq Tarar (1929–2022), President of Pakistan 1998–2001
- Muhammad al Warraq (800?–?), ninth-century skeptical scholar and critic of Islam
- Muhammad Yunus (1940–), Nobel Laureate and founder of the Grameen Bank
- Muhammad ibn Zayd (died 900), emir of Tabaristan
- Muhammad Muhammad Taib (born 1945), Malaysian politician
- Muhammad V of Kelantan, 15th Yang di-Pertuan Agong, Sultan of Kelantan
- Muhammad Subhan Qureshi (born 1959), biologist from Khyber Pakhtunkhwa, Pakistan
- Muhammad Ali Khan Wallajah (1717–1795), Indian Nawab of the Carnatic
- Muhammad Ali Khan Saif, Pakistani politician
- Muhammad Ali Khan Bhutto, Pakistani politician
- Muhammad Sultan Mirza (1375–1403), grandson and sometime-heir of the Central Asian conqueror Timur
- Muhammad Quli Qutb Shah, fifth Sultan of the Qutb Shahi dynasty
- Sultan Muhammad Qutb Shah, sixth Sultan of the Qutb Shahi dynasty
- Muhammad bin Abdulaziz Al Saud, former Crown Prince of Saudi Arabia
- Muhammad bin Saad Al Saud, former Deputy Governor of Riyadh Province and a member of Saudi Royal Family
- Muhammad bin Saud (1687–1765), founder of the first Saudi State
- Muhammad bin Suleyman, 16th-century Azerbaijani poet
- Muhammad I of Córdoba, fifth Emir of Córdoba
- Muhammad II of Córdoba, fourth Caliph of Cordoba, of the Umayyad dynasty in the Al-Andalus (Moorish Iberia)
- Muhammad III of Córdoba, tenth Caliph of Córdoba, of the Umayyad dynasty in the Al-Andalus (Moorish Iberia)
- Muhammad I of Granada, former Sultan of Granada
- Muhammad II of Granada, former Sultan of Granada
- Muhammad III of Granada, former Sultan of Granada
- Muhammad IV of Granada, former Sultan of Granada
- Muhammad V of Granada (1339–1391), former Sultan of Granada
- Muhammad VI of Granada (1332–1362), former Sultan of Granada
- Muhammad VII of Granada, former Sultan of Granada
- Muhammad VIII of Granada (1411–1431), former Sultan of Granada
- Muhammad IX of Granada (1396–1454), former Sultan of Granada
- Muhammad X of Granada, former Sultan of Granada
- Muhammad XII of Granada, former Sultan of Granada
- Muhammad I of Khwarazm, former Shah of Khwarazm
- Muhammad II of Khwarezm, former Shah of Khwarazm
- Muhammad ibn al-Qa'im, an Abbasid Prince and father of 27th Abbasid caliph Al-Muqtadi.
- Muhammad II of Ifriqiya, eighth Emir of the Aghlabids
- Muhammad Abdullahil Baqi (1886–1952), Bengali Islamic scholar, writer and politician
- Muhammad Kho Abdullah, Muslim name of Kho Jabing (1984–2016), a convicted Malaysian killer who was sentenced to death by hanging in Singapore.
- Muhammad Syamsul Ariffin bin Brahim (born 30 May 1983), Singaporean gang member of Salakau and fugitive on the run for murder since 31 May 2001.
- Muhammad Omar Ali (1919–2012), Bangladeshi Islamic scholar and translator
- Muhammad Kadar (1975–2015), Singaporean convicted murderer
- Muhammad Iskandar bin Sa'at, Singaporean criminal
- Muhammad bin Laden, Yemeni immigrant to Saudi Arabia and wealthy investor, businessman and patriarch of the bin Laden family
- Muhammad ibn Abd al-Wahhab (1703–1792), founder of Wahhabism
- Muhammad al-Bukhari (810–870), Persian muhaddith
- Muhammad al-Uthaymin (1929–2001), Saudi cleric
- Muhammad ibn al-Qasim, Arab military commander
- Muhammad Salih al-Luhaidan (1932–2022), Saudi cleric
- Muhammad al-Muslim, Iranian muhaddith
- Muhammad Amin Zaki, Kurdish historian and writer

=== Muhammadu ===
- Muhammadu Buhari (1942–2025), Nigerian politician who served as military dictator from 1983 to 1985, and democratically elected president from 2015 to 2023.

=== Muhammed ===
- Muhammed al-Ahari (born 1965), American essayist
- Muhammed Amin Andrabi (1940–2001), Indian academic
- Muhammed Demirel (born 2002), Turkish judoka
- Muhammad Jafar Moravej (1910–1999), Iranian Shia scholar
- Muhammad Javad Haj Ali Akbari, Iranian politician
- Muhammed Kanteh, Gambian politician
- Muhammed Yusuf Khan, Indian military leader
- Muhammed Latif, Iraqi major general
- Muhammed Lawal (born 1981), American professional wrestler and retired mixed martial arts fighter
- Muhammed Mansooruddin (1904–1987), Bengali author
- Muhammed Siddique, Bengali politician
- Muhammed Suiçmez (1975–), German musician
- Muhammed Taib (born 1939), Saudi Arabian lawyer
- Muhammed Tokcan, Turkish hijacker of the Avrasya in 1996
- Muhammed Hamdi Yazır (1878–1942), Turkish philosopher and theologian
- Muhammed bin Saud Al Saud (1934–2012), member of the Saudi Royal Family
- Muhammed ibn Umail al-Tamimi (900–960), Arab Alchemist
- Muhammed Yıldırmış (born 2004), Turkish recurve archer

=== Muhammet ===
- Muhammet Akagündüz (born 1978), Austrian footballer
- Muhammet Demir (born 1992), Turkish footballer
- Muhammet Hanifi Yoldaş (born 1983), Turkish footballer
- Muhammet Özdin (born 1978), Turkish footballer

=== Moegamat ===
- Moegamat Yusuf Maart (born 1995), a South African soccer player

== Patronymics ==
=== ibn ===
- Abu Bakr ibn Muhammad ibn Hazm (?–737), scholar
- Ibrahim ibn Muhammad (630–632), the Islamic prophet's son
- Qasim ibn Muhammad (598–600), the Islamic prophet's son
- Abdullah ibn Muhammad (600–614), the Islamic prophet's son
- Abd al-Raḥmān ibn Muḥammad (1332–1406), Arab historiographer and historian
- Marwan ibn Muhammad
- Abdallah ibn Muhammad, better known as Al-Saffah (r. 750–754), was the first Abbasid caliph and founder of Abbasid Caliphal dynasty.
- Abu Ja'far Abdallah ibn Muhammad, better known as Al-Mansur, was the second Abbasid caliph from 754 to 775.
- Ibrahim ibn al-Mahdi, also known as Ibrahim ibn Muhammad, was the Abbasid princess, singer and composer.
- Ubaydallah ibn al-Mahdi, also known as Ubaydallah ibn Muhammad, was the Abbasid princess and officer.
- Ali ibn al-Mahdi, also known as Ali ibn Muhammad, was the son of Abbasid caliph al-Mahdi and his wife Rayta.
- Musa al-Hadi, also known as Musa ibn Muhammad, was the fourth Abbasid caliph from 785 to 786.
- Harun al-Rashid, also known as Harun ibn Muhammad, was the fifth Abbasid caliph from 786 to 809.
- Abdallah ibn Muhammad al-Mahdi, the son of Abbasid caliph al-Mahdi.
- Isa ibn Muhammad al-Mahdi, the youngest brother of Harun al-Rashid.
- Musa ibn Muhammad al-Amin, the son of Abbasid caliph al-Amin.
- Abdallah ibn Muhammad al-Amin, the second son of caliph Al-Amin.
- Al-Wathiq (812–847), also known as Abu Ja'far Harun ibn Muhammad al-Mu'tasim, was the Abbasid caliph from 842 to 847.
- Al-Mutawakkil (822–861), also known as Ja'far ibn Muhammad al-Mu'tasim, was the tenth Abbasid caliph from 847 to 861.
- Muhammad ibn Muhammad al-Mu'tasim, the Abbasid prince and father of Al-Musta'in
- Ahmad ibn Muhammad al-Mu'tasim, an Abbasid princess and the patron of Art and science.
- Ali ibn Muhammad al-Mu'tasim
- Abdallah ibn Muhammad al-Mu'tasim, one of the youngest sons of caliph al-Mu'tasim.
- Abdallah ibn Muhammad, better known as Abdallah ibn al-Mu'tazz or simply as Ibn al-Muʿtazz, was an Arab prince and poet.
- Abu Bakr ibn Muhammad al-Muhtadi, the son of Abbasid caliph al-Muhtadi.
- Abdallah ibn Muhammad ibn al-Qa'im, better known as Al-Muqtadi, was the caliph of Baghdad during later Abbasid period.

=== bint ===
- Fatimah bint Muhammad (605–632 disputed), the Islamic prophet's daughter
- Zainab bint Muhammad, the Islamic prophet's daughter (according to most Sunnis)
- Ruqayyah bint Muhammad, the Islamic prophet's daughter (according to most Sunnis)
- Umm Kulthum bint Muhammad, the Islamic prophet's daughter (according to most Sunnis)
- Fatimah bint Muhammad was the wife of Arab caliph Al-Mansur.
- Abbasa bint al-Mahdi also known Abbasa bint Muhammad was the Abbasid princess.
- Ulayya bint al-Mahdi also known as Ulayya bint Muhammad was an Abbasid princess and Arab poet.
- Banuqa bint al-Mahdi also known as Banuqa bint Muhammad was elder sister of caliph Harun ar-Rashid.
- Aliyah bint al-Mahdi, also known as Aliyah bint Muhammad, was an Abbasid princess.

== Teknonymy ==
- Hasan ibn Ali also known as Abu Muhammad Hasan ibn Ali, was the son of Ali ibn Abi Ṭalib, and caliph in 661.
- Al-Hadi, also known as Abu Muhammad Musa al-Hadi, was the 4th Abbasid caliph.
- Al-Muktafi also known as Abu Muhammad Ali, was the 17th Abbasid caliph from 902 – 13 August 908.
- Al-Mustadi also known as Abu Muhammad Hasan ibn Yusuf al-Mustanjid was the Caliph in Baghdad from 1170 to 1180.

== Fictional ==
- Mohammed Avdol, an Egyptian supporting character from the Japanese manga and anime series JoJo's Bizarre Adventure.
- Mohammed, a minor character in Grand Theft Auto IV. He is a cab driver for Roman Bellic's taxi business.

== Derived names ==
=== Umm Muhammad ===
- Umm Muhammad bint Salih, was the wife of Abbasid caliph Harun al-Rashid.
- Hubshiya also known as Umm Muhammad was the mother of Abbasid caliph Al-Muntasir
- Qurb, also known as Umm Muhammad, was the mother of al-Muhtadi.
- Ashin, also known as Umm Muhammad, was the mother of 12th-century caliph of Baghdad al-Muqtafi.

=== Famous derived names ===
- Muhammad Ali
- Mohammad-Reza
- Mohammad Taqi (disambiguation), multiple people

== Legality and restrictions ==
=== China ===
In 2017, legislation made it illegal in China to give children names that the Chinese government deemed to "exaggerate religious fervor”. This prohibition included a ban on naming children Arabic transliterations of Muhammad. The legislation was officially intended to prevent "religious extremism" among the country's Uyghurs, but was described by external observers as an act of persecution.. The traditional Uyghur transliteration Memet (Uyghur: مەمەت; Chinese: 买买提; pinyin: Mǎimǎití) was not banned.

=== Pakistan ===
The government of Pakistan forbids members of its Ahmadi community from naming their children Muhammad. Al Jazeera reported in 2021 that blasphemy charges had been filed against Ahmadis who wrote "Mohammed" on a wedding invitation in an unspecified amount of instances.

== See also ==
- Ahmad
- Ma, surname used by some Chinese Muslims instead of Muhammad
- Mamadou, West African form of Muhammad
- Mehmed, a Turkish form of Muhammad
- Mohd, shortened version of Muhammad used in South Asia
- Mohannad
- Muhanad
- Mahammad
- Mahamat
- Yusuf Muhammad (disambiguation)
- Mohammadi (disambiguation)
- Muhammad (disambiguation)
- Arabic name
- Turkish name
