= Mamadou =

Mamadou is a common given name in West Africa among predominantly Muslim ethnic groups such as the Mandé and Wolof people. It is a variant of the Arabic name Muhammad. In Francophone countries, the name is sometimes used as a slur towards people of African descent.

== Academics ==
- Mamadou Diouf (historian), Senegalese professor of West African history at Columbia University

== Arts and music ==
- Mamadou Diabaté (born 1975), Malian kora player
- Mamadou Diop (musician) (born 1954), Senegalese rhythm guitarist and band leader
- Mamadou Konte (died 2007), Senegalese music producer
- Mamadou "Jimi" Mbaye (1957–2025), Senegalese guitarist

== Government ==
- Mamadou (mansa), ruler of the Mali Empire
- Mamadou Blaise Sangaré (born 1954), Malian politician, president of the Social Democratic Convention
- Mamadou Boye Bah (1930–2009), Guinean economist and politician
- Mamadou Dagra, Nigerien legal scholar and politician
- Mamadou Kamara Dékamo (born 1949), Congo-Brazzaville politician and diplomat
- Mamadou Dembelé (1934–2016), Malian politician
- Mamadou Dia (1910–2009), Senegalese politician, former prime minister
- Mamadou Diop (politician) (1936–2018), Senegalese politician, former mayor of Dakar
- Mamadou Koulibaly (born 1957), Ivorian politician
- Mamadou Lamine Loum (born 1952), Senegalese politician, former prime minister
- Mamadou Lamine Traoré (1947–2007), Malian politician
- Mamadou Maidah (1924–2005), Nigerien politician and diplomat
- Mamadou Ouédraogo (1906–1978), French Upper Volta (present-day Burkina Faso) politician
- Mamadou Samba Barry, Burkina Faso politician, secretary of the New Social Democracy party
- Mamadou Seck (politician) (born 1947), Senegalese politician, president of the National Assembly of Senegal
- Mamadou Sylla (politician) (1960–2026), Guinean judge and businessman
- Mamadou Tandja (1938–2020), Nigerien politician, former president

== Sports ==
- Mamadou Alimou Diallo (born 1984), Guinean footballer
- Mamadou Bagayoko (born 1979), Malian footballer
- Mamadou Bagayoko (footballer, born 1989) (born 1989), Ivorian footballer
- Mamadou Bah (born 1988), Guinean footballer
- Mamadou Baldé (born 1985), Senegalese footballer
- Mamadou Camara (born 1988), French footballer
- Mamadou Danso (born 1983), Gambian footballer
- Mamadou Dansoko (born 1982), Ivorian footballer
- Mamadou Chérif Dia (born 1984), Malian long and triple jumper
- Mamadou Diabang (born 1979), Senegalese footballer
- Mamadou Diakité (born 1985), Malian footballer
- Mamadou Diallo (disambiguation), multiple people
- Mamadou Diarra (born 1986), Malian basketball player
- Mamadou Diop (basketball, born 1955) (born 1955), Senegalese basketball player at the 1980 Summer Olympics
- Mamadou Djikine (born 1987), Malian footballer
- Mamadou Doumbia (footballer, born 1980) (born 1980), Ivorian footballer
- Mamadou Gueye (jumper) (born 1986), Senegalese long and triple jumper
- Mamadou Gueye (sprinter) (born 1986), Senegalese 400 metres sprinter
- Mamadou Jalloh (born 2006), Danish-born Sierra Leonean footballer
- Mamadou N'Diaye (disambiguation), multiple people
- Mamadou Niang (born 1979), Senegalese footballer
- Mamadou Lamine Sadio (born 2007), Senegalese footballer
- Mamadou Sakho (born 1990), French footballer of Senegalese descent
- Mamadou Samassa (footballer, born 1986) (born 1986), French-born Malian international footballer also of Senegalese descent
- Mamadou Samassa (footballer, born 1990) (born 1990), French-born Malian international footballer
- Mamadou Seck (born 1979), Senegalese footballer
- Mamadou Tall (born 1982), Burkina Faso footballer
- Mamadou Wague (born 1990), French footballer
- Mamadou Zaré (1964–2007), Ivorian football manager
- Mamadou Zongo (born 1980), Burkina Faso footballer
