= List of current maraji =

Maraji (plural of marja) are the supreme legal authority followed by Twelver Shia Muslims, also known as Imamiyyah, around the world. The concept of a Marja al-taqlid (lit. 'source of emulation') is central to Usuli Shi'a Islam. Marja al-taqlid provides religious interpretations on matters of law and rituals. Ideally, the most just and knowledgeable specialists in the field of Islamic law become recognized as the marja-i taqlid. In practice, this rarely happens and there are several marja al-taqlid whom an individual may choose to emulate.

Clerics who reach the apex of Shi'a theological hierarchy, in centers of learning, become marja-i taqlids. Approximately since 1940, marja-i taqlids are often referred to by their followers with the honorific of Ayatollah al-`Uzma (Arabic: Grand Ayatollah, where "ayatollah" means "sign of God").

Among the responsibilities of marja-i taqlids are the collection and distribution of religious taxes, such as zakat and khums.

== Current ==
No	Image	Name	Birth year CE	Birth place	Residence	Notes
1		Hossein Noori Hamedani حسین نوری همدانی	21 March 1925 (age 101)	Hamadan, Qajar Iran	Qom, Iran	Official Website
2		Naser Makarem Shirazi ناصر مکارم شیرازی	25 February 1927 (age 99)	Shiraz, Imperial State of Iran	Qom, Iran	Official Website
3		Mohammad Rahmati Sirjani محمد رحمتی سیرجانی	1928 (age 97–98)	Sirjan, Imperial State of Iran	Qom, Iran	Official Website
4		Ja‘far Sobhani جعفر سبحانی	9 April 1929 (age 97)	Tabriz, Islamic republic of Iran	Qom, Iran	Official Website
5		Sayyid Ali Husayni Sistani سید علی حسینی سیستانی	4 August 1930 (age 96)	Mashhad, Islamic republic of Iran	Najaf, Iraq	Official Website
6		Abdollah Javadi-Amoli عبدالله جوادى آملى	5 May 1933 (age 93)	Amol, Islamic republic of Iran	Iran	Official Website
7		Hossein Mazaheri حسین مظاهری	16 November 1933 (age 93)	Isfahan, Islamic republic of Iran	Isfahan, Iran	Official Website
8		Sayyid Ali Mohammad Dastgheib Shirazi سید علی محمد دستغیب شیرازی	14 March 1935 (age 91)	Shiraz, Islamic republic of Iran	Shiraz, Iran	Official Website
9		Mirza Yadollah Duzduzani میرزا یدالله دزدوزانی	1935 (age 90–91)	Islamic republic of Iran	Iran	Official Website
10		Shamsodin Vaezi شمس الدین الواعظی	1936 (age 89–90)	Kingdom of Iraq	Iraq	Official Website
11		Mohammad Ali Gerami Qomi محمدعلى گرامى قمی	1938 (age 87–88)	Islamic republic of Iran	Iran	Official Website
12		Sayyid Kazim Hussaini al-Haeri سید كاظم حسينی حائريی	1938 (age 87–88)	Kingdom of Iraq	Iran	Official Website; Has officially resigned as Marja
He is Dead		Ali Asghar Rahimi Azad علی اصغر رحیمی آزاد	1939 (age 86–87)	Islamic republic of Iran	Iran	Official Website
13		Sheikh Yasubedin Rastegar Jooybari شيخ يعسوب دين رستگار جويباری	1940 (age 85–86)	Juybar, Islamic republic of Iran	Qom, Iran	Official Website
14		Mohammad Mohammad Taher Aleshobair Khaqani محمد محمد طاهر آل شبير الخاقاني	1940 (age 85–86)	Kingdom of Iraq	Iraq	Official Website
15		Sheikh Khalil Qudsi Mehr Tabrezi شیخ خلیل قدسی مهر تبریزی	1940 (age 85–86)	Islamic republic of Iran	Iran	Official website
16		Asadollah Bayyat Zanjani اسدالله بیات زنجانی	23 December 1941 (age 84)	Zanjan, Islamic republic of Iran	Iran	Official Website
17		Dosti Zanjani دوستى زنجانى	1941 (age 84–85)	Islamic republic of Iran	Qom, Iran	Official Website
18		Ali Karimi Jahromi علی کریمی جهرمی	10 April 1942 (age 84)	Jahrom, Islamic republic of Iran	Iran	Official Website
19		Bashir Hussain Najafi بشير حسين النجفي	1942 (age 83–84)	Jalandhar, British India	Najaf, Iraq	Official Website
20		Sayyid Sadiq Hussaini Shirazi سید صادق حسینی شيرازی	20 August 1942 (age 84)	Karbala, Kingdom of Iraq	Qom, Iran	Official Website
21		Sheikh Noori Hatim Saadi الشيخ نوري حاتم الساعدي	1944 (age 81–82)	Kingdom of Iraq	Iraq	-
22		Sayyid Mohammad Taqi al-Modarresi السيد محمد تقي المدرسي	1 July 1945 (age 81)	Karbala, Kingdom of Iraq	Iraq	Official Website
23		Sayyid Ali Asghar Dastgheib سید علی‌اصغر دستغیب	25 November 1945 (age 80)	Shiraz, Islamic republic of Iran	Iran	Official Website
24		Sayyid Ahmad Hassani Baghdadi السيد احمد الحسني البغدادي	1945 (age 80–81)	Kingdom of Iraq	Iraq	Official Website
25		Sayyid Allaedin Ghoraifi السيد علاء الدين الغريفي	1945 (age 80–81)	Baghdad, Kingdom of Iraq	Iraq	Official Website
26		Seyyed Mohammad Hosseini Zanjani سید محمد حسینی زنجانی	1947 (age 78–79)	Qom, Islamic republic of Iran	Iran	Official Website
27		Saleh Taei صالح الطائي	1948 (age 77–78)	Kingdom of Iraq	Iraq	Official Website
28		Ali Al-Saleh علي الصالح	1948 (age 77–78)	Kuwait	Kuwait	-
29		Seyed Javad Alavi Borujerdi سید جواد علوی بروجردی	16 April 1951 (age 75)	Qom, Islamic republic of Iran	Iran	Official Website
30		Mohammad Amin Mamaqani محمد أمين المامقاني	10 June 1951 (age 75)	Kingdom of Iraq	Iraq	Biography Official Website
31		Jawad Khalesi جواد الخالصي	13 September 1951 (age 75)	Kingdom of Iraq	Iraq	-
32		Khalil Mobasher Kashani خلیل مبشر کاشانی	1951 (age 74–75)	Islamic republic of Iran	Iran	Official Website
33		Sayyid Husayn Esmaeel al-Sadr السيد حسين إسماعيل الصدر	1952 (age 73–74)	Baghdad, Kingdom of Iraq	Iraq	Official Website
34		Fazel Maleki فاضل المالكي	8 April 1954 (age 72)	Kingdom of Iraq	Iraq	Official Website
35		Sayyid Ali Hassani Baghdadi سید علي الحسنی البغدادی	1955 (age 70–71)	Kingdom of Iraq	Iraq	Official Website
36		Seyed Mohammad Yasrebi سید محمد یثربی	1955 (age 70–71)	Qom, Islamic republic of Iran	Iran	Official Website
37		Sayyid Kamal al-Haydari سید كمال الحیدری	1 January 1956 (age 70)	Karbala, Kingdom of Iraq	Iran	Official Website
38		Sayyid Mohammad Hadi Ghazanfari Khansari سید محمد هادي غضنفری خوانساری	1957 (age 68–69)	Islamic republic of Iran	Iran	Biography
39		Sayyid Muhsin Hojjat Kabuli سید محسن حجت كابلی	1957 (age 68–69)	Kingdom of Afghanistan	Afghanistan	Official Website
40		Seyed Mohammad Amin Khorasani سید محمد امین خراسانی	9 February 1958 (age 68)	Sabzevar, Islamic republic of Iran	Iran	Official Website
41		Mohammad Jamil Hammoud al-Amili محمد جميل حمود العاملي	1959 (age 66–67)	Beirut, Lebanon	Lebanon	Official website
42		Mohammad Yaqoobi محمد اليعقوبي	9 September 1960 (age 66)	(First Republic of Iraq) Najaf, Iraqi Republic (1958–1968)	Najaf, Iraq	Official Website
43		Sayyid Reza Hosseini Nassab سيد رضا حسینی نسب	1960 (age 65–66)	Yazd, Islamic republic of Iran	Canada	Official Website
44		Mohammad Baqer Movahedi Najafi محمد باقر موحدى نجفى	1961 (age 64–65)	(First Republic of Iraq) Iraqi Republic (1958–1968)	Iran	Official Website
45		Mohammad al-Sannad محمد السند	1962 (age 63–64)	Bahrain	Iraq	Official Website

== See also ==
- List of deceased maraji
- Marja
- Ijtihad
- Ayatollah
- List of ayatollahs
- List of hujjatul Islams
