= Kazem =

Kadhim/Kazem/Kadim
- Pronunciation: Arabic: [kaːðˤɪm] Persian: [ˈkɒːzem] Turkish: [ˈcaːzɯm] Albanian: [ˈcazim]
- Gender: Male
- Language: Arabic

Origin
- Meaning: 'one who controls his anger and doesn’t act on it'

Other names
- Alternative spelling: Kadhim, Kadim, Kadhem, Kazim, Qazim, Cathum

Kazem (also spelled Kadim, Kadhem, Kadhim, Kazim, Qazim or Cathum; written in Arabic: كاظم, in Persian: کاظِم) means "tolerant", "forgiving", and "having patience" is an Arabic male given name. Although the pronunciation of the Arabic letter Ẓāʾ is often closer to a strong "d" sound, given the prevalence of the name in Greater Iran, and subsequent cultural exchanges between Persia and Indian Subcontinent, Central Asia and Anatolia, the letter is commonly pronounced as Z. Thus the name's pronunciation differs based on location and consequently in its transcription. The most notable person to be awarded with this epithet was Musa-Al-Kadhim, the seventh Shia Imam, who is revered by both Sunnis and Sufis too.

== Given name ==
- Kâzım Özalp (1880–1968), Turkish military officer
- Kâzım Karabekir (1882–1948), Turkish military officer
- Qazim Koculi (1887–1943), Albanian politician
- Kâzım Orbay (1887–1964), Turkish general and senator
- Qazim Dervishi (1908–1994), Albanian referee
- Kazim Ergin (1915–2002), Turkish geophysicist
- Kazim al-Samawi (1925 – 2010) Iraqi poet and journalist
- Kazem Rajavi (1934–1990), Iranian politician
- Kazım Ayvaz (1938–2020), Turkish sport wrestler
- Kazem al-Haeri (born 1938), Iraqi-Iranian cleric
- Kadim Al Sahir (born 1957), Iraqi singer
- Kazem Akhavan, Iranian diplomat
- Kazim Ali (born 1971), American poet
- Kazem Borjlou (born 1980), Iranian footballer
- Kazem Mohammad (born 1938), Iranian biostatistician and academic
- Kazem Nourmofidi (born 1940), Iranian cleric
- Kazem Seddiqi (born 1951), Iranian cleric
- Kadhem Sharif (born 1952), Iraqi wrestler and weightlifter
- Kazem Oraee (born 1954), Iranian engineer
- Kazem Jalali (bona 1967), Iranian politician
- Kazem Mousavi (born 1969), Iranian cleric
- Seyed Kazem Seyed Bagheri (born 1971), Iranian cleric and political scientist
- Kazim Hosein, Trinidad and Tobago politician
- Kazim Ali Zardari (born 2006) ISI and Pak army defender

== Surname ==
- Juggan Kazim (born 1980), Pakistani model
- Leyla Kazim (born 1985), British food and travel writer and media personality
- Raza Kazim (1930–2026), Pakistani philosopher and political activist
- Safinaz Kazem (born 1937), Egyptian author
- Wissam Kadhim (born 1986), Iraqi footballer
- Reza Shah-Kazemi (born 1960), British-Iranian Islamic scholar

== See also ==
- Musa al-Kadhim
