= Hadi =

Name list

Hadi or Hady (Arabic: هادي) is an Arabic masculine given name and surname, meaning "leader" or "guide". Al-Hadi ("The Guide") is one of the names of God in Islam. It is derived from the Arabic triconsonantal root ه د ي; also present in hidayah.

== Given name ==
=== Hadi ===
- Hadi Saei (born 1976), Iranian taekwondo athlete
- Hadi Elazzi (born 1973), Turkish music producer and manager
- Hadi Aghily (born 1980), Iranian footballer
- Hadi Kazemi (born 1976), Iranian actor, narrator, sculptor, painter and photographer
- Hadi Khorsandi (born 1943), Iranian poet, satirist and editor
- Hadi Norouzi (1985–2015), Iranian footballer

- Hadi Teherani (born 1954), Iranian-German architect and designer living in Germany
- Hadi al-Mahdi (c. 1967 – 2011), Iraqi journalist, radio talk show host, and assassination victim
- Hadi Thayeb (1922–2014), Indonesian diplomat and politician
- Hadi Ghaffari (born 1950), Iranian Hujjat al-Islam
- Hadi Khamenei (born 1947), Iranian reformist politician, mojtahed and linguist
- Hadi al-Modarresi (born 1957), Iranian Ayatollah
- Mohammad Hadi Ghazanfari Khansari (born 1957), Iraqi-born Iranian Ayatollah
- Mohammad Hadi Milani (1892–1975), Iranian Ayatollah
- Hadi Al-Amiri (born 1954), Iraqi general and politician
- Hadi al-Bahra (born 1959), Syrian politician
- Hadi Al Masri (born 1986), Syrian footballer
- Hadi Tiranvalipour (born 1998), Iranian taekwondo practitioner
- Hadi Choopan (born 1978), Iranian bodybuilder

=== Salimanto Hadi ===
- Hady Amr (born 1964), U.S. political advisor and Special Envoy
- Hady Habib (born 1998), Lebanese tennis player
- Hady Khashaba (born 1972), Egyptian footballer
- Hady Mirza (born 1980), Singaporean singer
- Hady Shahin (born 1986), Egyptian handball player

== Surname ==
- Abd Rabbuh Mansur Hadi (1945–2026), Yemeni President
- Noor Hadi (born 1986), Indonesian footballer
- Saiyid Muhammad Hadi (1863–1939), Indian agricultural technologist
- Seftia Hadi (born 1991), Indonesian footballer

== Derived name ==
- Abdul Hadi, Arabic theophoric name
- Mahdi, Arabic theophoric name
- Huda (given name), Arabic gender-neutral theophoric name

== See also ==
- Arabic name
