= Mahammad =

Mahammad Məhəmməd
- Gender: Male
- Language: Azerbaijani

Origin
- Meaning: Praiseworthy

Other names
- Alternative spelling: Mahammadim
- Derived: Muḥammad, مُحَمَّد, from Ḥammada, "Praise", حَمَّدَ
- Related names: Muhammad

Mahammad (Azerbaijani: Məhəmməd) or Mahammadim (Hebrew: מַחֲּמַדִּ֑ים, romanized: Maḥămaddîm) is an Azerbaijani and Hebrew name.

== People ==
- Mahammadali bey Mekhfi (1832–1892), Azerbaijani poet
- Mahammad Amin Rasulzade (1884–1955), Azerbaijani politician
- Mahammad Maharramov (1895–1982), Azerbaijani politician
- Mahammad Hadi (1879–1920), Azerbaijani poet
- Mahammad Mirzabeyov (born 1990), Russian-born Azerbaijani footballer
- Mahammad Muradli (born 2003), Azerbaijani chess grandmaster

== See also ==
- Muhammad (name)
