= Mamadou Diallo =

Mamadou Diallo may refer to:

== Sportspeople ==
=== Association football ===
- Mamadou Mariem Diallo (born 1967), Senegalese footballer
- Mamadou Diallo (footballer, born 1971), Senegalese footballer
- Mamadou Diallo (footballer, born 1982), Malian footballer
- Mamadou Alimou Diallo (born 1984), Guinean football defender
- Mamadou Diallo (footballer, born 1990), Guinean football forward who played for Hougang United FC
- Mamadou Diallo (footballer, born 1994), Guinean football forward who plays for Grenoble
- Mamadou Diallo (footballer, born 1995), Guinean football forward who plays for Águia FC Vimioso
- Mamadou Diallo (footballer, born 1996), Mauritanian football forward who plays for CSKA 1948
- Mamadou Diallo (footballer, born 1997), Guinean football forward who plays for Energetik-BGU Minsk

=== Other sports ===
- Mamadou Diallo (judoka) (born 1941), Guinean Olympic judoka
- Mamadou Diallo (athlete) (born 1954), Senegalese track and field athlete
- Mamadou Diaw Diallo (born 1969), Guinean wrestler
- Mamadou Diallo (wrestler) (fl. 1984), Mauritanian wrestler

== See also ==
  - Mamadou Sylla (footballer, born 1994) (born 1994), born Mamadou Sylla Diallo, Senegalese footballer
