= Mohammad-Reza =

Mohammad-Reza (Persian: محمدرضا, also spelled as Mohammad Reza, or Mohammadreza) is a popular male given name in Iran. Mohammad and Reza are both Arabic names which are popular in the whole Muslim world. However, the usage of the compound given name Mohammad-Reza is mostly popular in the modern Iran (mostly among those who are born after 1926, when Reza Shah was crowned and his son, Mohammad-Reza, became the crown prince).

== People ==
- Mohammad-Reza Adelkhani
- Mohammad-Reza Amin
- Mohammad-Reza Aref
- Mohammad-Reza Bahonar
- Mohammad-Reza Bateni
- Mohammad Reza Eskandari
- Mohammad-Reza Foroutan
- Mohammad Reza Golzar
- Mohammad-Reza Golpaygani
- Mohammad-Reza Hafeznia
- Mohammad-Reza Hedayati
- Mohammad-Reza Heidarian
- Mohammad-Reza Honarmand
- Mohammad Reza Jozi
- Mohammad Reza Khalatbari (footballer, born 1948)
- Mohammad Reza Khalatbari (footballer, born 1983)
- Mohammad-Reza Khatami
- Mohammad-Reza Lotfi
- Mohammad-Reza Mahdavi
- Mohammad-Reza Mahdavi Kani
- Mohammad Reza Mamani
- Mohammad-Reza Modarresi Yazdi
- Mohammad Reza Pahlavi (also known as Mohammad Reza Shah), the second Shah of the Pahlavi dynasty and the last Shah of Iran
- Mohammad Reza Rahimi
- Mohammad-Reza Roudaki
- Mohammad Reza Saket
- Mohammad-Reza Shafiei Kadkani
- Mohammad-Reza Shajarian
- Mohammad-Reza Sharifinia
- Mohammed Reza Taheri-azar
- Mohammad-Reza Tavassoli
- Mohammad Reza Zahedi
- Mohammad-Reza Zarrindast
