= Magomed =

- Gender: Male
- Language: Russian

Origin
- Meaning: Praiseworthy

Other names
- Derived: Muḥammad, مُحَمَّد, from Ḥammada, "Praise", حَمَّدَ
- Related names: Muhammad

Magomed (Russian: Магомед) is a Russian form of the Arabic name Muhammad meaning "praiseworthy".

== People ==
- Magomed Abdulaev (1961–2023), Russian lawyer and politician
- Magomed Abdusalamov (born 1981), Russian boxer
- Magomed Abdusalamov (taekwondo) (born 2002), Russian taekwondo practitioner
- Magomed Ankalaev (born 1992), Russian mixed martial artist
- Magomed Daudov (born 1980), Chechen politician
- Magomed Magomedkerimov, Russian mixed martial artist
- Magomed Umalatov, Russian mixed martial artist
- Magomedrasul Khasbulaev (born 1986), Russian mixed martial artist
