= Mahamat =

Mahamat is an African name derived from the Arabic Muhammad meaning "praiseworthy".

== People ==
- Mahamat Said Abdel Kani, Central African warlord
- Mahamat Déby, president of Chad
- Mahamat Paba Salé, Cameroonian diplomat
- Mahamat Kamoun, Central African politician
- Mahamat Labbo, Chadian footballer

== See also ==
- Mahatma
