= Seyed Mohammad Yasrebi =

Iranian Grand Ayatollah (born 1955)

Grand Ayatollah Sayyid Mohammad Yasrebi
- آیت الله العظمی سید محمد یثربی
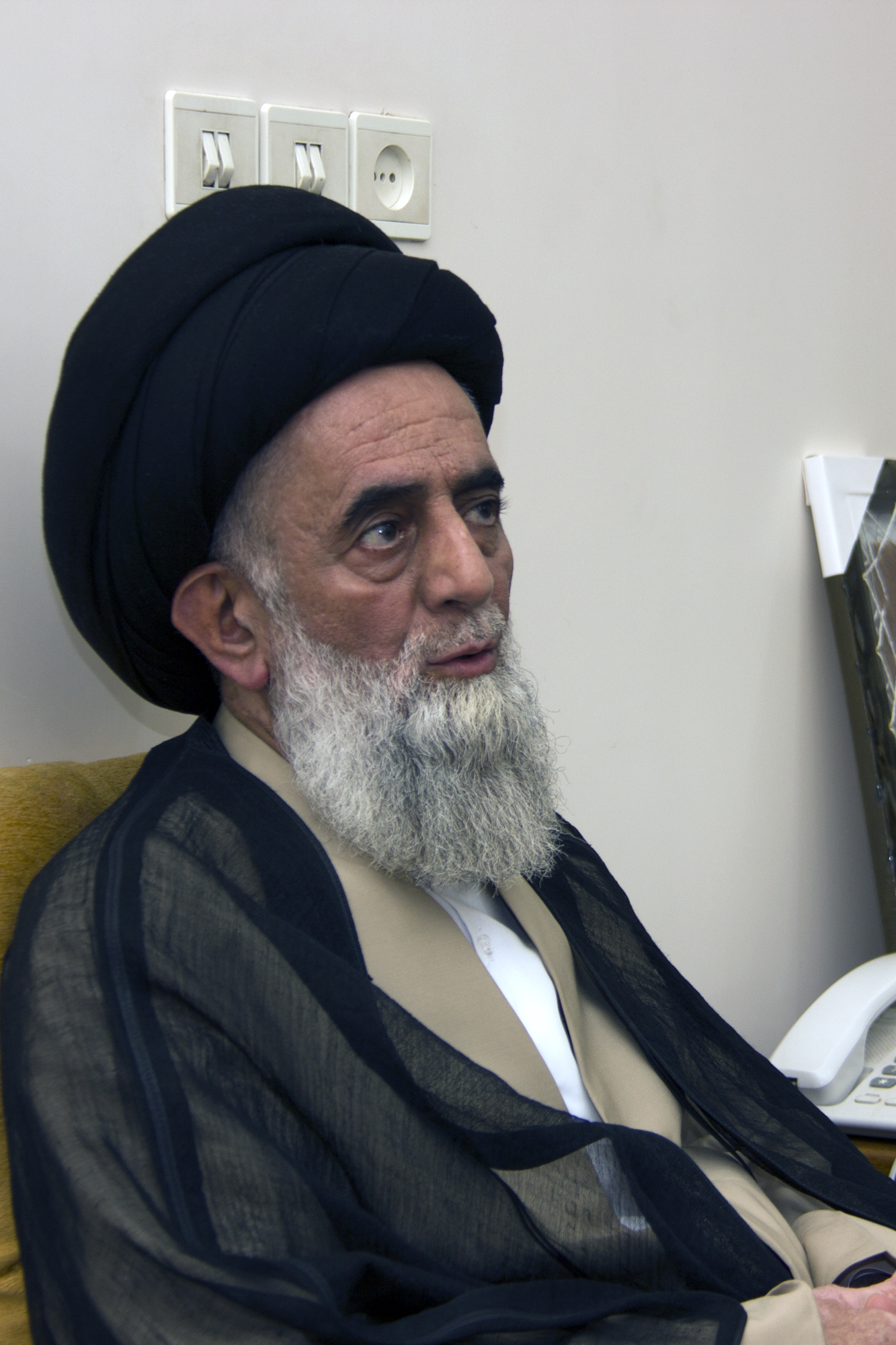

Personal life
- Born: Mohammad Yasrebi; 1955 (age 70–71) Qom, Imperial State of Iran
- Parent: Seyed Mahdi Yasrebi (father)
- Education: Qom Hawza
- Relatives: Seyed Ali Yasrebi - uncle
- Website: Official Website

Religious life
- Religion: Islam
- Sect: Shia; Twelver
- Jurisprudence: Ja'fari

Muslim leader
- Based in: Qom and Kashan

Seyed Mohammad Yasrebi Persian: سید محمد یثربی is an Iranian Grand Ayatollah. He currently resides between Qom, where his main office is situated, and Kashan, where he is the head of the Islamic seminary. He holds classes in both Qom and Kashan where he teaches advanced levels in Islamic studies, otherwise known as 'Darse Kharij'. He often leads big prayers, such as Eid Prayers in Kashan. His father, Seyed Mahdi Yasrebi, was the founder of the Kashan Islamic seminary.

== Early life and education ==
Yasrebi was born into a very religious family with several known scholars. He moved to Kashan with his family at the age of five. His father, Seyed Mahdi, was the first Friday Prayer leader of Kashan, after the 1979 Iranian revolution chosen by Ruhollah Khomeini. His uncle, Seyed Ali Yasrebi Kashani, was a prominent seminary teacher and among the teachers of Seyed Ruhollah Khomeini.

From 1975, he pursued advanced studies in Qom under Morteza Haeri and prominent authorities such as Vahid Khorasani, Seyyed Mohammad Rouhani, and Mohammad Reza Golpaygani. He also attended philosophy lessons (Asfar) taught by Ayatollah Sadr, Morteza Motahhari, and Abdullah Javadi Amoli.

== Teaching Career ==
Yasrebi began teaching advanced “Dars-e Kharij” (advanced jurisprudence and principles) in 1999. In 1990, he founded the “Allameh Mojaddad Vahid Behbahani Scientific Research Institute” for the research and publication of books in Islamic sciences. This institute is active in the seminary and holds more than five thousand volumes of books and numerous treatises.

== Works ==
He has around 20 authored works. About half of them deal with rights from a religious perspective, addressing social, economic, Hajj, political, family, physical, devotional, and educational dimensions. Other works include:

- Al-Madarij al-Fiqhiyyah
- Lecture notes on Makaseb al-Muharramah (Jurisprudence), 2 volumes
- A Treatise on the Development of Usul al-Fiqh (Arabic)
- A Treatise on the Development of the Science of Fiqh (Arabic)
- A Treatise on Theology (Kalam) (Arabic)
- A Treatise on Wilayah; Introduction to the book “The Strategy of Ahl al-Sunnah Regarding the Issue of Wilayah”
- In the Realm of the Verses of Wilayah and Imamate
- A Study of the Verses of Wilayah and Imamate: Examination of the Caliphs’ Conquests and the Prohibition of Hadith Compilation
- A Study of the Verses of Wilayah and Imamate: Critique of the Theory of the Justice of the Companions
- A Study of the Verses of Wilayah and Imamate: Imamology and a Critique of Wahhabi Views
- Commentary on the Treatise of Rights of Imam Sajjad (peace be upon him) in 3 volumes; a collection of his lectures broadcast on Radio Ma‘aref
- In Seclusion with the Beloved (God)

== See also ==
- List of current maraji
