= Tuwaa =

The Tuwaa Discussion Forum (Arabic: منتدى طوى) was one of the first Saudi discussion forums that promoted liberalism. It was founded in 2001 and was the most popular cyber-based discussion forum in Saudi Arabia.

A successor to Elaph's Forum, the first liberal Saudi forum on the web, Tuwaa members discussed social, religious and political reforms of Saudi Arabia and criticised the support of the religious institution by the Saudi Government, and criticised Wahhabism.

The site attracted famous Saudi writers and intellectuals as participants, among them were Turki al-Hamad and Muhammed Taib, a liberal activist.

The forum was subjected to several hacking and denial of service attacks by Saudi extremists and the site was blocked and forced to shut down by the Saudi Interior Ministry on 11 May 2004.

== See also ==
- The Bees Army
