= Muhanad =

Muhanad is a masculine given name.

== List of people with the surname ==
- Muhanad Al-Halak (born 1989), Iraqi-German politician
- Muhanad Madyen (born 1994), Libyan footballer
- Muhanad Mahmoud Al Farekh, American terrorist

== See also ==
- Mohannad
- Muhammad (name)
