= Mamadou N'Diaye =

Mamadou N'Diaye is the name of:

- Mamadou N'Diaye (athlete) (1939–2008), Senegalese Olympic sprinter
- Mamadou N'Diaye (basketball, born 1975), Senegalese basketball player
- Mamadou N'Diaye (basketball, born 1993), Senegalese basketball player
- Mamadou N'Diaye (footballer, born 1984), Senegalese footballer
- Mamadou N'Diaye (footballer, born 1986), Senegalese footballer
- Mamadou N'Diaye (footballer, born 1995), Senegalese footballer
- Mamadou N'Diaye (footballer, born 1996), Senegalese footballer
