= Mohamed Amami =

Tunisian footballer

Personal information
- Full name: Mohamed Amine Amami
- Date of birth: 6 February 1983 (age 43)
- Position: Defender

Senior career*
Years	Team	Apps	(Gls)
2008–2009	US Monastir		
2009–2010	EGS Gafsa		
2010–2011	US Monastir		
2011	EGS Gafsa		
2012	ES Beni-Khalled		
2012	Stade Tunisien		
2013	Olympique Béja		
2013–2014	Grombalia Sports		
2017–2019	AS Soliman		
- * Club domestic league appearances and goals

Mohamed Amine Amami (born 6 February 1983) is a Tunisian football defender.
