= Mohammed Naseeb Qureshy =

Indian geologist (1933–2005)

Mohammed Naseeb Qureshy (MN Qureshy) (4 January 1933 – 2005) was a prominent geologist from India.

His main field of study was Exploration geophysics. He graduated from Aligarh Muslim University (AMU) and earned his Doctorate of Science (DSc) degree in Exploration geophysics from the Colorado School of Mines.

During the early 1970s, MN Qureshy designed and coordinated the first indigenous aerial geophysical survey of the Western Ghats and Chitradurga Copper District in India. He also initiated the national regional gravity mapping programme which culminated in publication of first comprehensive gravity maps of India.

From 1983 to 1989, he served as the Advisor to the Government of India, Earth Sciences. During this time he helped establish some key Indian scientific organisations such as the National Remote Sensing Centre (NRSC), Hyderabad and the National Center for Medium Range Weather Forecasting (NCMRWF), New Delhi. He also initiated the Natural Resources Data Management System (NRDMS) to better serve national needs related to exploitation of natural resources. In 1989, Qureshy planned and established the Centre for Science and Technology of the Non-Aligned (NAM) and other Developing Countries.

== Publications ==
1. MN Qureshy's research is synthesized in a book entitled Geophysical Framework of India, Bangladesh and Pakistan. https://books.google.com/books/about/Geophysical_Framework_of_India_Banglades.html?id=GCk9dnEfwdEC

2. M. N QURESHY, N. KRISHNA BRAHMAM, S. C GARDE and B. K MATHUR, Gravity Anomalies and the Godavari Rift, India;
3. M. N. Qureshy and Waris E. K. Warsi, A Bouguer anomaly map of India and its relation to broad tectonic elements of the sub-continent
4. M. N QURESHY, Relation of gravity to elevation and rejuvenation of blocks in India

5.QURESHY, M.N. and IQBALLUDIN (1992) A review of geophysical constraints in modelling of the Gondwana crust in India. Tcctonophysics, v.2 12, pp. 14 1–1 5 1.

6. Qureshy, M. N. (1986). Satellites in the Study of Earth’s Interior. Journal of Geological Society of India, 28(1), 59–61. Retrieved from http://www.geosocindia.org/index.php/jgsi/article/view/65985

7.M. N. QURESHY; S. VENKATACHALAM; C. SUBRAHMANYAM, Vertical Tectonics in the Middle Himalayas: An Appraisal from Recent Gravity Data https://pubs.geoscienceworld.org/gsa/gsabulletin/article-abstract/85/6/921/201645/Vertical-Tectonics-in-the-Middle-Himalayas-An?redirectedFrom=fulltext#

8. Qureshy, M. N., & Warsi, W. E. K. (1975). Role of Regional Gravity Surveys in a Concept Oriented Exploration Programme-Some Inferences from a Study in a Shield Area of Central India. Journal of Geological Society of India, 16(1), 44–54. Retrieved from https://www.geosocindia.org/index.php/jgsi/article/view/63476
