= Muhammad Rahul =

Indonesian politician (born 1995)

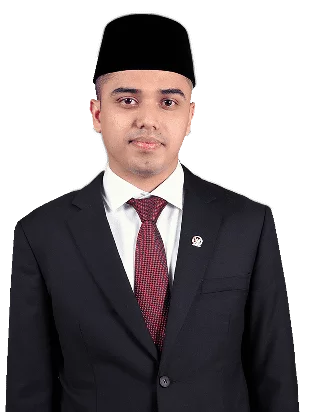
- Muhammad Rahul in 2019

Member of the House of Representatives
- Incumbent
- Assumed office 1 October 2019
- Constituency: Riau I

Personal details
- Born: 15 December 1995 (age 30)
- Party: Gerindra Party

Muhammad Rahul (born 15 December 1995) is an Indonesian politician serving as a member of the House of Representatives since 2019. He has served as chairman of the Gerindra Party in Riau since 2022.
