= New Social Democracy =

New Social Democracy may refer to one of the following political parties:

- New Social Democracy (Burkina Faso)
- New Social Democracy (Czech Republic)
- New Social Democratic Party (North Macedonia)
- New Social Democracy (Slovenia)

== See also ==
- Social Democratic Party
