= Kazem al-Haeri =

Twelver Shi'a Marja (born 1938)

Grand Ayatollah Sayyid Sayyid Kadhim al-Haeri
- آية الله العظمى السيد كاظم الحائري
- Grand Ayatollah Kadhim Haeri

Personal life
- Born: 1938 (age 87–88) Karbala, Kingdom of Iraq

Religious life
- Religion: Islam
- Denomination: Twelver Shi'ism

Grand Ayatollah Kadhim Husayni al-Haeri (Arabic: كاظم الحسيني الحائري) (born 1938) is an Iranian Marja in Twelver Shi'ism. He has studied in seminars of Najaf, Iraq under Grand Ayatollah Sadeq al-Sadr. Haeri was born in Karbala, Iraq. He was a top leader of the Al-Da'wa Party in Iraq. His involvement in the party led to his exile in the 1970s, later he moved to Iran, where he remains to this day in the city of Qom.

Al-Haeri is considered the successor to Mohammad Baqir al-Sadr, but since al-Haeri has resided in Iran since the 1970s he has not been able to fully take on this position. Despite his exile, he serves as the advisor to the younger al-Sadr on matters of jurisprudence. Thus, al-Haeri is a key source of legitimacy for Al-Sadr. Al-Sadr had previously stated that he would have worked with Ayatollah Mohammed Baqir al-Hakim if Ayatollah al-Haeri had ordered it. Recently, Muqtada al-Sadr and Abdul-Aziz al-Hakim signed a pact to end all potential hostilities between the two camps.

Al-Haeri has also issued fatwas against the U.S.-led occupation of Iraq, but he publicly criticized Muqtada al-Sadr for potential weakening against the Shi'a establishment and its hierarchy in Najaf under the guise of anti-Americanism in April 2004 while taking Haeri's name.

On August 29, 2022, al-Haeri announced his resignation from the position of Marja, due to old age and illness. This was described as the first time in history a Marja has ever resigned from his position.

== Works ==
Among al-Haeri's published works are the following:

- "Wilayat al-Amr fi Asr al-Ghaybah" (ولاية الأمر في عصر الغيبة)
- "Fiqh al-Uqud" (2 vols.; فقه العقود)
- "Dirasat Fiqhiyyah" (دراسات فقهية)
- "Buhuth fi al-Ijtihad wa al-Taqlid" (بحوث في الاجتهاد والتقليد)
- "Al-Qada fi al-Fiqh al-Islami" (القضاء في الفقه الإسلامي)
- "Mabani Fatawa fi al-Amwal al-'Ammah" (مباني فتاوى في الأموال العامة)
- "Al-Bay" (البيع)
- "Al-Kifah al-Musallah fi al-Islam" (الكفاح المسلح في الإسلام)

== See also ==
- List of current maraji
- Ayatollah
- Marja'
