= Mamadou N'Diaye (footballer, born 1984) =

Senegalese footballer

Personal information
- Full name: Mamadou N'Diaye
- Date of birth: January 12, 1984 (age 42)
- Place of birth: Dakar, Senegal
- Height: 1.92 m (6 ft 3 1/2 in)
- Position: Defender

Team information
- Current team: Portimonense S.C.
- Number: 6

Senior career*
Years	Team	Apps	(Gls)
2006–2007	Vitória Setúbal		
2007–	Portimonense S.C.		
- * Club domestic league appearances and goals

Mamadou N'Diaye (born January 12, 1984) is a Senegalese football (soccer) defender. He currently plays for Portimonense S.C.
