= Seyed Javad Alavi Borujerdi =

Iranian ayatollah (born 1951)

Grand Ayatollah Sayyid Mohammad-Javad Alavi Tabatabaei Borujerdi
- آیت الله العظمی سید محمدجواد علوی طباطبایی بروجردی
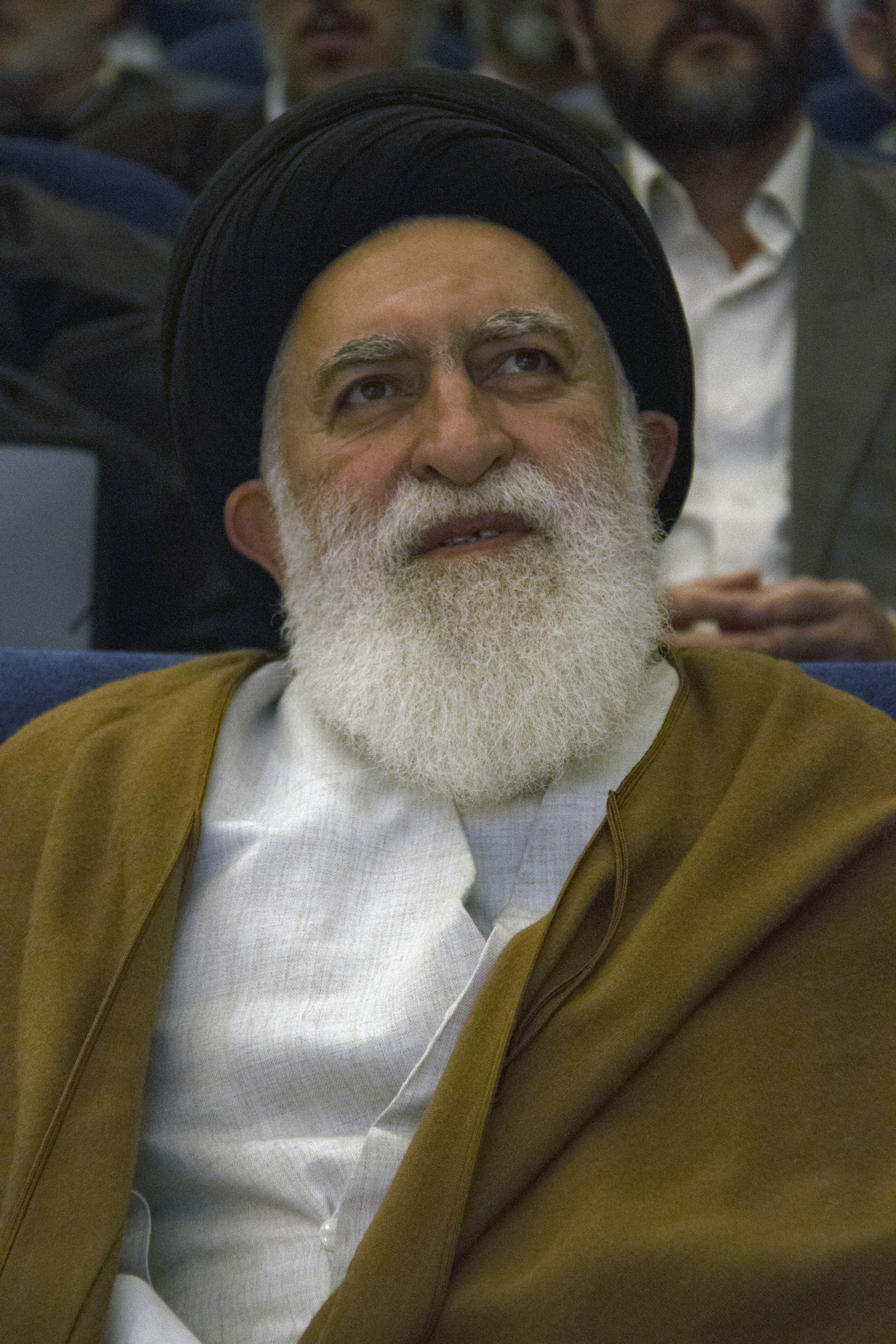

Personal life
- Born: Mohammad-Javad Alavi Tabatabaei Borujerdi; April 16, 1951 (age 75) Qom, Imperial State of Iran
- Parents: Seyed Mohammad-Hossein Alavi Borujerdi (father); Sakineh (mother)
- Education: Qom Hawza
- Relatives: Hussein Borujerdi - Grandfather
- Website: Official Website

Religious life
- Religion: Islam
- Sect: Shia; Twelver
- Jurisprudence: Ja'fari

Muslim leader
- Teacher: Vahid Khorasani, Morteza Haeri Yazdi, Seyed Mohammad Rohani, Abdollah Javadi Amoli, Jawad Tabrizi
- Based in: Qom

Seyed Mohammad-Javad Alavi Tabatabaei Borujerdi (born 16 April 1951) known as Sayyid Javad Alavi Borujerdi, is an Iranian Shia jurist (faqih) and Shia marjaʿ al-taqlid residing in Qom.

He is the maternal grandson of Ayatollah Sayyid Hossein Borujerdi. The administration and endowments (waqf) of institutions affiliated with grandfather are under his supervision.

== Early life and education ==
Seyed Mohammad-Javad Alavi Tabatabaei Borujerdi was born on 16 April 1971 in Qom.

His father, Seyed Mohammad-Hossein Alavi, was both a student and son-in-law of Ayatollah Seyed Hossein Borujerdi, the general marjaʿ of the Shia. After Borujerdi's death, his father migrated to Tehran.

His mother, Sakineh, is the daughter of Sayyid Hossein Borujerdi.

Alavi Borujerdi began his primary education in Qom. After finishing primary school, he completed secondary education in Tehran. At the same time as attending high school, he studied Islamic sciences at the Abdol-Hossein Bazaar Seminary (Madrasah).

In 1969 he returned to Qom Seminary to continue his religious studies. Alongside studying, he also taught intermediate and advanced seminary courses (sath and higher lessons).

He studied under:

- Ayatollah Sheikh Hossein Vahid Khorasani
- Ayatollah Seyed Mohammad Rohani
- Ayatollah Sheikh Morteza Haeri Yazdi
- Ayatollah Sheikh Abdollah Javadi Amoli
- Ayatollah Sheikh Mirza Javad Tabrizi

== Teaching career ==
Borujerdi began teaching in the Qom Seminary (Hawza):

- Usul al-Fiqh advanced lessons (Dars-e Kharej Usul) starting 1991.
- Fiqh advanced lessons (Dars-e Kharej Fiqh) starting 1996.

== Publication of His Risalah ==
In the summer of 2018 Alavi Borujerdi formally announced his marjaʿiyya by publishing his practical treatise (Risalah), “Tawzih al-Masa’il.”

== Opposition by Mohammad Yazdi to His Marjaʿiyya ==
Mohammad Yazdi, during his time as head of the Society of Seminary Teachers of Qom, while emphasising the central role of this organisation in recognizing marjaʿs, explicitly opposed the marjaʿiyya of Seyed Javad Alavi Borujerdi.

He stated that:

“Not everyone should become a marjaʿ in the seminary.”

== Views and Opinions ==
Borujerdi is considered among traditional Shia clerics.

He is also known for critical statements on topics such as:

- Pride in Cyrus the Great
- Criticism of cultural decision-making by the government and the seminary

He also supports the independence of the seminary and opposes the use of government budgets to fund it.

== Views on Marjaʿiyya and Politics ==
Borujerdi was also an intermediary between a dispute regarding Seyed Sadiq al-Shirazi and Government of Iran. Boroujerdi delivered the Iranian Government's message to al-Shirazi, stating that:

"they have no problem with him being a religious authority, but he should limit himself to preaching and guiding students and preachers and refrain from criticizing the Government and the Leader in his speeches."

In March 2025, Borujerdi expressed his deep condolences to the people of Bandar Abbas, regarding the explosion that took place in the Shaheed Rajai Port which left many dead on the anniversary of Fatima Zahra's birthday.

"I wanted to congratulate you on this blessed day today, but our hearts are mourning these days. The tragedy that occurred in Bandar Abbas took the lives of a large number of our brothers and children; mainly workers and drivers who were present at the scene. Families are still searching for the remains of their loved ones, and the conditions are very difficult and life-threatening."

In March 2026, Borujerdi expressed his condolences to Mojtaba Khamenei on the Assassination of his father, Ali Khamenei.

== Views on Contemporary Issues ==
According to Alavi Borujerdi, the seminary must conduct precise subject-analysis (mawzuʿ-shenasi) when dealing with new issues (mustahdathat).

Regarding banking, he states that according to Muhammad Baqir al-Sadr's theory, Muslims initially viewed banks as inherently usurious institutions, which he argues is incorrect.

He says:

- Banks are modern institutions developed in the West
- They are new phenomena
- Banks do not merely lend money to earn interest
- Rather they provide credit for specific purposes such as industry or housing

Therefore, banking activity is not necessarily riba, but rather relates to interest as a financial concept.

== Response to Questions About Nuclear Weapons ==
About two months after the twelve-day Iran–Israel war, the marjaʿ responded to a question regarding the religious ruling on nuclear weapons.

In response to a question from Ensaf News asking:

“Is acquiring the knowledge and practical capacity to build a nuclear bomb — without actually building it — forbidden?”

He replied:

“In the Name of God. Acquiring the knowledge and practical capacity has no problem.”

== Works ==
Alavi Borujerdi has authored several books. Some of his works include:

- Notes from Vahid Khorasani's advanced lessons in Usul
- Notes from Vahid Khorasani's advanced Fiqh lessons (Makaseb, Salat)
- Notes from Sayyid Mohammad Rouhani's full course in Usul (except Istishab)
- Notes from Rouhani's lessons on Hajj, options (Khiyarat), and sale
- Notes from Seyed Mohammad Reza Golpayegani's lessons on Hajj, Umrah, and sales
- Notes from Sheikh Morteza Haeri Yazdi's lessons on options and Khums
- Notes from Mirza Javad Agha Tabrizi's Makaseb al-Muharrama
- Notes from Sheikh Abdollah Javadi Amoli's metaphysics (Asfar)
- The Role and Position of Reason in Deriving Legal Rulings
- The Principle of “La Haraj” (No Hardship)
- Manual of Hajj Rituals
- Theoretical Foundations of Sunni-Shia Rapprochement According to Seyed Hossein Borujerdi

== See also ==
- List of Maraji
