= Saleh Taei =

Iraqi Twelver Shi'a Marja (born 1948)

Saleh AL- Taei
- Born: 1948; Iraq
- Other names: Grand Ayatollah Saleh AL- Taei
- Website: www.marjaiaa.com/

Grand Ayatollah Saleh Taei (Arabic: صالح الطائي) (born 1948) is an Iraqi Twelver Shi'a Marja.

He's a religious figure known for his opinion on the need to reconnect the Islamic sects and forbidding the division of doctrines. He has studied in seminaries of Najaf, Iraq under Grand Ayatollah Abul-Qassim Khoei and Mohammad Mohammad Sadeq al-Sadr.

== Opinions ==
On the 10th of January 2008, he published his opinion on forbidding the division of doctrines in Islam. حرمة تقسيم المسلمين الى سنة وشيعة

== See also ==
- List of maraji
