= Mohammad Ali Gerami Qomi =

Iranian Twelver Shi'a Marja (born 1938)

Grand Ayatollah Mohammad Ali Gerami Qomi
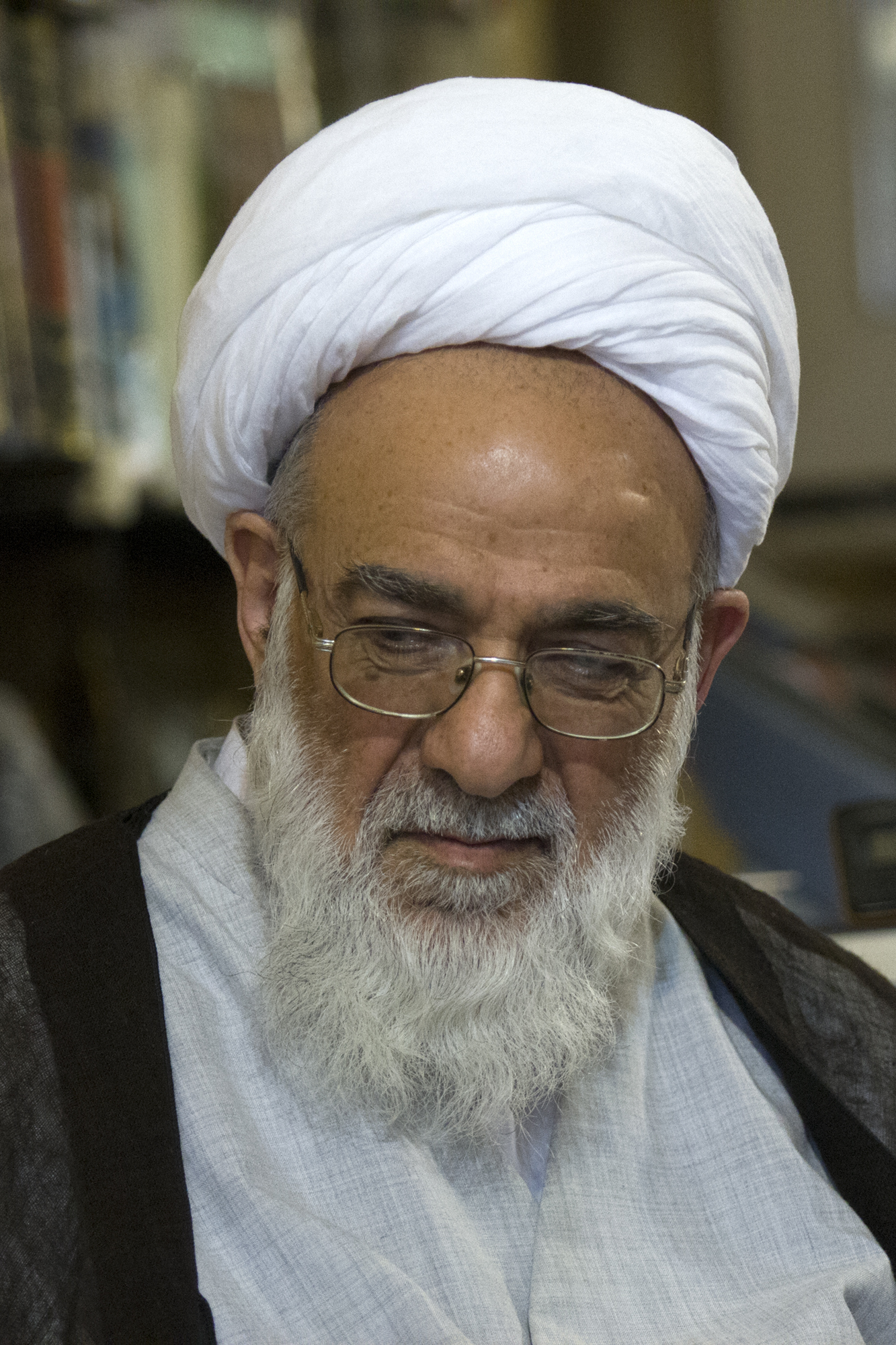
- Grand Ayatollah Mohammad Ali Gerami
- Born: 1938; Iran
- Website: www.ayat-gerami.ir

Grand Ayatollah Mohammad Ali Gerami Qomi (Persian: محمدعلى گرامى قمي; born 1938) is an Iranian Twelver Shi'a Marja.

He has studied in seminaries of Qum, Iran under Grand Ayatollah Hussein-Ali Montazeri, Ali Meshkini, Seyyed Hossein Borujerdi, Mohammad Ali Araki, Mohammad-Reza Golpaygani and Mirza Hashem Amoli.

== Political and cultural activities ==
Before the Revolution, Ayatollah Gerami was a member of the Society of Seminary Teachers of Qom and was active in political affairs. He was repeatedly interrogated by SAVAK, imprisoned, and sent into exile. He did not stop his activities even during his exile and imprisonment. After the Revolution, he continued to carry out cultural and scientific work to strengthen the Revolution. Among Ayatollah Gerami's cultural activities is traveling to villages for religious preaching; during one of his trip to the city of Babol,he fought against Baha'ism in that city.

== See also ==
- List of current maraji
- Qom
- Ijtihad
- Marja
