= Mamadou Diallo (footballer, born 1995) =

Guinean footballer

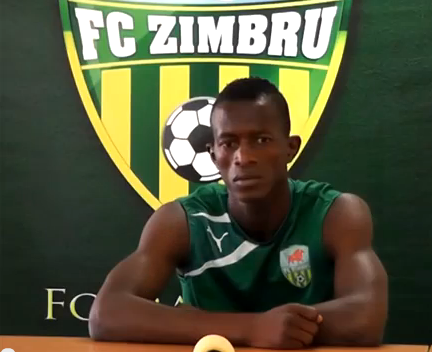
- Diallo interviewed in 2014 for Zimbru Chișinău

Personal information
- Full name: Mamadou Saliou Diallo
- Date of birth: 17 March 1995 (age 31)
- Place of birth: Conakry, Guinea
- Height: 1.85 m (6 ft 1 in)
- Position: Forward

Team information
- Current team: Águia FC Vimioso
- Number: 23

Youth career
- 2011–2012: Oeiras
- 2012–2013: Real
- 2013–2014: Braga

Senior career*
Years	Team	Apps	(Gls)
2014	Zimbru Chișinău	1	(0)
2016–2017	Vitória de Sernache	15	(4)
2017	CF Armacenenses	9	(0)
2017–2018	Canelas 2010	8	(0)
2018	AD Oliveirense	3	(1)
2018–2019	Operário	16	(7)
2019	Pedras Salgadas	3	(0)
2019–2020	Operário	15	(2)
2020–	Águia FC Vimioso	8	(2)
- * Club domestic league appearances and goals as of 20:56, 25 January 2021 (UTC)

Mamadou Saliou Diallo (born 17 March 1995) is a Guinean professional footballer who plays as a forward for Águia FC Vimioso. He also holds a Portuguese citizenship.
