= Mahammadali bey Mekhfi =

Azerbaijani poet

Mahammadali bey Mashadi Asadulla bey oghlu Mekhfi
- Azerbaijani: Məhəmmədəli bəy Məxfi
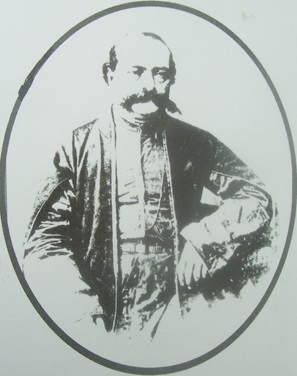
- Born: 1832; Shusha
- Died: 1892 (aged 59–60); Shusha
- Writing career
- Language: Azerbaijani language
- Notable work: Ahvalati – Garabagh

Mahammadali bey Mekhfi (Azerbaijani: محمدعلی بگ مخفی, Məhəmmədəli bəy Məxfi) was an Azerbaijani poet, titular adviser, member of the Mejlis-Uns, and author of the work "Ahvalati – Garabagh" (Azerbaijani: اﺣﻮاﻻت ﻗﺮاﺑﺎغ, Əhvalati-Qarabağ).

== Life ==
Mahammadali bey Mashadi Asadulla bey oghlu Valiyev (Azerbaijani: محمدعلی بگ مشهدی اسدالله بگ اوغلی ولی‌ییف, Məhəmmədəli bəy Məşədi Əsədulla bəy oğlu Vəliyev) was born in 1832 in Shusha. His father, Mashadi Asadulla bey Haji Hasanali bey oghlu Veliyev, was a well-known merchant. Having received primary education from his father, Mahammadali bey continues his studies at the madrasah. He studied the Russian language at the Shusha district school. Subsequently, he worked as an official in the Shamakhi, Tiflis, Irevan and Shusha district departments. Having started the civil service as an interpreter, he rose from the rank of the provincial secretary to the rank of the titular adviser.

Mahammadali bey was also a poet. He wrote under the pseudonym of Mekhfi. As a representative of the Fuzuli literary school, he was also influenced by the literary heritage of Molla Panah Vagif. Mir Mohsun Navvab, Mahammed agha Mujtahidzade and others spoke about him in their works. He was a member of the literary circle "Mejlisi-Uns" organized in the second half of the 19th century in Shusha in the house of the Azerbaijani poet Khurshidbanu Natavan. He also worked as a correspondent for the newspaper "Akinchi" in Karabakh.

The work "Ekhvalati-Garabag" (1888) was written under the pseudonym of "Baharli". In 2001, Orkhan Baharli, in his article titled “About the author of the work “Ahvalati Garabagh”, based on a number of facts, came to the conclusion that the author of this work was Mahammadali bey Mekhfi. At the beginning of the work, there are indicated the reason for its writing and the contents. Although it is written that the work will consist of 12 chapters, in “Ahvalati Garabagh”, the only manuscript which is contained in the Matenadaran, there are three chapters. In the work, more is written about architectural monuments, historical figures, traditions and customs, and ethnographic features of Karabakh than about its history.

Muhammadali-bey Mehfi died in 1892.
