= Mohamed Aboelgheit =

Investigative journalist from Egypt

- محمد أبو الغيط
- Born: 3 October 1988; Assiut, Egypt
- Died: 5 December 2022 (aged 34); London, United Kingdom
- Education: Medical degree
- Occupations: Investigative journalist, writer, documentary producer
- Years active: 2010–2022
- Employers: Al-Shorouk; Al Masry Al Youm; Al Jazeera; CNN; Deutsche Welle; Global Witness
- Notable work: Uncovering military health fraud in Egypt; Investigating Western arms sales violations in the Yemen War; Exposing secret funding networks for Sudanese RSF militia
- Awards: Ricardo Ortega Memorial Prize – Gold Medal (2019); Fesitov Journalism Award (2020)

Mohamed Aboelgheit (Arabic: محمد أبو الغيط; 3 October 1988, Assuit – 5 December 2022, London) was an Egyptian investigative journalist who was "in the vanguard of a new generation of activists and dynamic journalists that emerged from the turmoil of the Arab Spring." His work, which is considered "unmatched in a region widely hostile to reporters," uncovered military health fraud in Egypt, how Western countries violated bilateral arms sales in the Yemen War, and revealed secret funding networks for Sudanese Rapid Support Forces militia.

Aboelgheit died on December 5, 2022 at the age of 35, of stomach cancer, a 17 month ordeal he documented as a diary that was posthumously published as Oh Light, I am Coming (Arabic: أنا قادم أيها الضوء).

== Early career ==
Born in Assiut, Egypt on 23 October 1988, Aboelgheit originally trained as a medical doctor, starting his career at the public Imbaba General Hospital in Giza. His first foray into writing was as an amateur, garnering third place in a Library of Alexandria short story competition in 2010.

He joined the protests of the 2011 Egyptian Revolution, for which he was arrested. Aboelgheit started writing straight after his release, establishing his own blog, Gedaria (Frescoe), where one of his early posts, "Al-Fuqara' Awalan ya Welad al-Kalb!" (Put the poor first you sons of bitches!), went viral, criticising the political elite for squabbling over cultural and ideological issues, while forgetting the demands of the poor.

Aboelgheit started writing for the blog Bos wa Toll (Look and See), inspired by what he saw as the "humanising of economic issues" by journalists such as Omayma Kamal, Salma Hussein, and Wael Gamal. Through Gamal, Aboelgheit applied to write as a guest columnist in Egyptian daily Al Shorouk, and then writing for another well known daily, Al Masry Al Youm.

== Investigative journalism ==
Aboelgheit made his mark as an investigative journalist in 2014, where in an investigative piece for Al-Shorouk, he uncovered a fraudulent Egyptian Armed Forces medical doctor who claimed he invented a device to cure Hepatitis C, HIV/AIDS, and other viruses. The embarrassing debacle later became known as Koftagate, in reference to the use of minced meat skewers. Aboelgheit however, felt threatened by the rise of the military regime and how it was jailing journalists, and fled Egypt for the United Kingdom a few months after publishing his piece when president Abdel Fattah al-Sisi was elected in mid 2014.

Aboelgheit then worked with Aljazeera media network, producing a number of documentaries including 50 different Signatures, revealing the extent of Egyptian bureaucracy, The Assassination of Farag Fouda,, a prominent Egyptian human rights activist, and Who Burned my City, which gathered eyewitness accounts of the great Cairo fire in 1952.

Between 2018, and 2019 Aboelgheit and a team of journalists, researched and produced a series of documentaries about the use of American-made weapons in the Yemen War, airing on CNN, and Deutsche Welle. He was awarded the Ricardo Ortega Memorial Prize - Gold Medal, for his work in 2019.

In 2019, Aboelgheit along with Nick Donovan and Richard Kent, published an investigative article in Global Witness, that revealed secret funding networks for Sudanese Rapid Support Forces militia, an organisation they identified then as having significant military power and financial independence that could threaten peaceful democratic transition in Sudan. The piece won them the Fesitov Journalism Awards in 2020. Their predictions have unfortunately been proven true, as the RSF instigated the 2023 Sudan conflict with other military factions in April, in an attempt to grab power.

Later in 2020, Aboelgheit contributed to another Global Witness investigation, this time exposing part of Syrian dictator, Bashar A-lAssad's financial network.

== Selected writing ==
=== Investigative journalism ===
With documents and pictures, Al Shorouk tracks virus C cure inventor (Arabic), Al Shorouk, 6 March 2014.

Yemen and the global arms trade, DW Documentary. 4 December 2018. United Nations Correspondents Association Awards, Ricardo Ortega award for best broadcast journalism, 2019 - Gold Medal.

The End User: How did western weapons end up in the hands of ISIS and AQAP in Yemen? Arab Reporters for Investigative journalism (ARIJ), 28 February 2019. True Story Award 2021 - Recipient.

(With Richard Kent and Nick Donovan) Exposing the RSF's secret financial network, Global Witness, 9 December 2019. 2020 Fetisov Journalism Awards, Outstanding Contribution to Peace - Winner.

=== Opinion pieces and columns ===
As if nothing had happened (Arabic), Al-Masry Al-Youm, 12 October 2012. Mustafa Al-Husseini Award 2013 for young Arab journalism - Recipient.

Season of the Living Dead (Arabic), Al-Shorouk. Samir Kassir Award 2014 - Recipient.

=== Book ===
Oh Light I am Coming (Arabic), Dar al-Shorouk, 2022.
