= Muhammed Taib =

Muhammed S. Taib
- Born: 1939 (age 86–87); Mecca, Saudi Arabia
- Occupation: Activist

Muhammed Saeed Taib (Arabic: محمد سعيد طيب, Muḥammad Sa‘eed Ṭayib) (born 1939) is a Saudi Arabian political activist, lawyer, writer, and one of the most prominent liberals in the country. He is best known for his 1992 book Prince and Intellectuals (مثقفون وأمير: الشورى وسياسة الباب المفتوح) which outlines his views on the political reforms of Saudi Arabia. The book was banned in Saudi Arabia. Taib has recently participated in the Saudi Arabian National Debate (الحوار الوطني).

== See also ==
- Tuwaa
