= Mohammed Al Aqib =

Qatari footballer (born 1983)

Personal information
- Full name: Mohammed Hassan Al Aqib
- Date of birth: January 13, 1983 (age 43)
- Place of birth: Qatar
- Height: 1.70 m (5 ft 7 in)
- Positions: Winger; left-back

Senior career*
| Years | Team | Apps | (Gls) |
| 2003–2005 | Al-Sadd | | |
| 2005–2011 | Umm Salal | | |
| 2011–2015 | Qatar SC | 10 | (0) |
| 2015–2017 | Al Ahli | 18 | (0) |
| 2017 | → Muaither (loan) | 8 | (0) |
| 2017–2018 | Al-Khor | 4 | (0) |
| 2018–2023 | Al Bidda | | |
- * Club domestic league appearances and goals

Mohammed Al Aqib is a Qatari footballer who currently plays as a left back.

In 2017, he was loaned to Muaither SC, a club colloquially known as Al-Mu'aidar SC.
