= Mamadou Dagra =

Nigerien jurist and politician

- Born: Niger
- Citizenship: Nigerien
- Education: Doctorate
- Occupation: Politician Lecturer

Mamadou Dagra (born in Kaoutchouloum, 1953) is a Nigerien legal scholar and politician.

== Life ==
Mamadou Dagra is a member of the Kanuri ethnic group in the eastern part of Niger. He completed his primary education in Kellé and subsequently attended the Lycée National de Niamey between 1965 and 1972. He studied legal studies at the University of Dakar obtaining a Licence ès lettres and a Doctorat d'État in public law.

From 1976 to 1977, Dagra served as head of the European Department in the Ministry of Foreign Affairs in Niamey. He subsequently worked as a counselor at Niger’s Permanent Mission to the United Nations in New York until 1978. Beginning in 1980, he joined the Faculty of Economics and Law at the University of Niamey, first as an assistant, later serving as dean from 1981 to 1985, and as maître-assistant in 1987. Between 1984 and 1989, he also chaired the board of the École Nationale d’Administration in Niamey. Dagra was recognized as one of the theorists of the “development society,” a social model promoted under the Supreme Council of the Armed Forces (1974–1989). He introduced the term “régime d’exception” (“exceptional regime”) to describe the military rule in Niger during this period, which operated without a formal constitution.

During the Second Republic under President Ali Saïbou and the single-party rule of the National Movement for the Development Society (MNSD), Mamadou Dagra entered political office for the first time. He served as Chief of Cabinet to Prime Minister Mamane Oumarou in 1989 and was appointed Minister of National Education at the end of that year. In early 1990, he moved to the role of Minister of Public Service, Labour, and Training, a position he held until 1991. Following his return to academia in Niamey, Dagra became recognized as one of Niger’s foremost legal scholars after Abdourahamane Soli. He was active in legal publishing and, with support from entities such as the Danish Institute for Human Rights, endeavored to revitalize legal journals in the country. In 1996, he was appointed Special Advisor in the cabinet of Prime Minister Amadou Boubacar Cissé.

President Mamadou Tandja reinstated Mamadou Dagra into government in 2007 during the Fifth Republic, appointing him as Minister of Justice, a position he held for two years. During his tenure, he also chaired the Council of Ministers of the Organisation for the Harmonisation of Business Law in Africa (OHADA). Domestically, Dagra promoted the strengthening of anti-terrorism legislation in response to the activities of the Nigerien Movement for Justice and supported a nationwide awareness campaign aimed at providing one million children particularly in rural areas with birth certificates. In 2009, he was reassigned from the Ministry of Justice to the Ministry of Vocational and Technical Training. Mamadou Dagra was vice-president of the five-member body that drafted the constitution of the Sixth Republic. Under President Mohamed Bazoum , he was appointed a judge at the Constitutional Court in 2023.

== Writings ==
- La Démocratie participative au Niger : allier l’idéal au fonctionnel. Bulletin du Comité National de Développement, no. 16, September 1985, pp. 12–16.
- The external politics of Niger (1974–1987): Contribution to the study of diplomatic structures and African politics in the Sacred State. Doctoral thesis, Université Cheikh Anta Diop, Dakar, 1987.
- The Nigerian Electoral Code of April 16, 1996: facteur de renouveau démocratique et de stabilité? Revue Nigérienne de Droit, no. 1, March 1999, pp. 15–51.
- The budget and international cooperation: de quelques aspects de la coopération bilatérale du Niger. In: Idrissa Kimba (ed.), Le Niger: État et démocratie, Paris: L’Harmattan, 2001, ISBN 2-7475-0303-8, pp. 173–224.
- Justice constitutionnelle et processus de démocratisation en Afrique de l’Ouest francophone: rapport national Niger. Franz von Liszt Institute Working Paper, no. 6, Giessen: Franz von Liszt Institute for International and Comparative Law, October 2014.
