= Mohammed Al-Kandari =

Kuwaiti politician (born 1971)

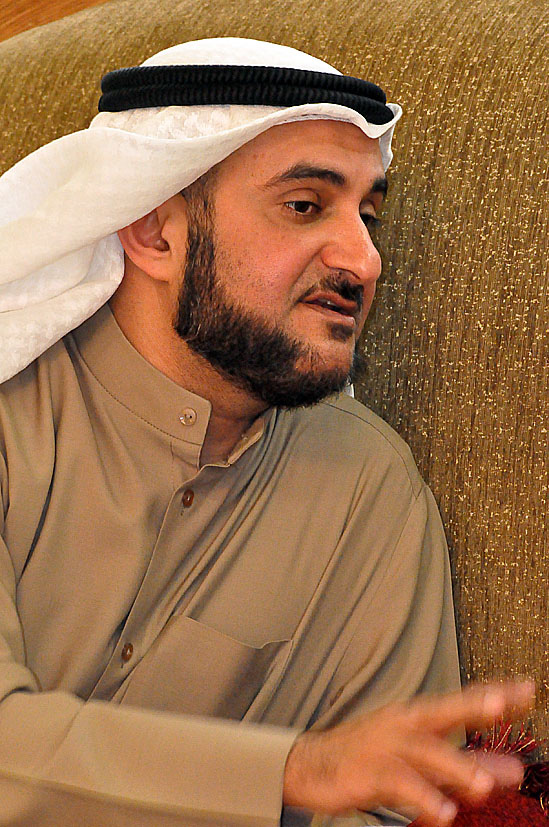
Mohammed Al-Kandari

Mohammed Al-Kandari was a member of the Kuwaiti National Assembly, representing the first district. Born in 1971, Al-Kandari studied medicine before being elected to the National Assembly in 2008. While political parties are technically illegal in Kuwait, Al-Kandari affiliates with the Islamic Salafi Alliance.

== Against Celebrating Christmas in Kuwait ==
On December 24, 2006, Al-Kandari told Al-Watan Daily that Muslims should not wish their Christian friends "Merry Christmas". Al-Kandari argued that to do so contradicts with Islam because Christians believe Jesus was the son of God.

== See also ==
- Al-Kandari
