= Hadi al-Mahdi =

Iraqi journalist

- Born: Hadi al-Mahdi ca. 1965; Iraq
- Died: September 8, 2011; Baghdad, Iraq
- Education: Baghdad's Academy of Fine Arts
- Occupations: Journalist, filmmaker, and playwright
- Years active: 1989–present
- Title: Radio host of To Whoever Listens
- Spouse: Medea Raauf
- Children: 3

Hadi al-Mahdi (ca. 1965– 8 September 2011) was an Iraqi freelance journalist and radio talk show host of To Whoever Listens, which was broadcast by Radio Demozy (104.01 FM) out of Baghdad Iraq. He was assassinated in his home.

While al-Mahdi was one of 95 journalists killed in the last ten years, his death was widely noted in the intellectual community of Iraq. According to The New York Times story after his death, "perhaps none of the (other) killings (of Iraqi journalists) has resonated so deeply in a nook of society that welcomed war with such eagerness."

The New York Times, which wrote a profile on him one year before he was killed, compared him to Rush Limbaugh in his visibility and impact: "arguably the most breathtaking exercise of free speech in a place where its limits are still being established. It is, by some accounts, one of the most popular programs on the air in Baghdad. It is, without question, immensely entertaining."

== Career ==
Mahdi attended Iraq's Academy of Fine Arts in 1989. After his studies, Mahdi took refuge in Syria and from there Sweden. He returned to Iraq in 2007 after 18 years. In Iraq, he hosted the radio show To Whoever listens for Radio Demozy, an independent station, a year later.

He was a well known, outspoken critic of the Iraqi government, known for tackling subjects other journalists would not discuss. He was known for criticizing the Iraqi government for being corrupt, not distributing water and food to its citizens, and the country's ineffective educational system. He was becoming more widely known for organizing and participating in anti-government 2011 Iraqi protests.

== Death ==
On 8 September 2011, the day before nationwide protests against the Iraqi government were set to take place, Mahdi was shot twice in the head at his home in the Al-Karada neighborhood of Baghdad. He had made references in his writings and in his latest radio broadcasts that he had received written threats on his life and threatening phone calls. Mahdi had been the host of a radio show that aired three times a week, but he had not made a show in two months out of a need for safety. Reports indicate that none of his valuables had been taken from his house, further solidifying that his murder was motivated by his political stances.

== Context ==
Mahdi's career as a journalist occurred during a transition period in Iraq as the United States was drawing down force levels and the Iraqi government was assuming more control. His criticisms were focused at what he called a corrupt Iraqi government taking advantage of the people and lacking respect for democratic process and human rights. Mahdi was a voice for the people. He used his Facebook page to organize regular Friday protests for a Day of Anger in the spirit of the Arab Uprisings in Tunis and Egypt. After the protest in February he was arrested and detailed for several hours. He continued organizing protests until his death. He assumed a visible role as a leader of protests.

== Reactions ==
In The New York Times, the Committee to Protect Journalists said that 95 journalists had been murdered since 2001 without any convictions.

Robert Mahoney, deputy director of the CPJ, said: "Iraq remains one of the most dangerous places for journalists to work, and the Iraqi authorities' record of impunity for journalist murders is dismal. "With this murder, a strong independent voice in Iraq has been silenced. Those who carried out this killing cannot go unpunished."

Joe Stork, deputy Middle East director at Human Rights Watch, said: "The killing of Hadi al-Mahdi sadly highlights that journalism in Iraq remains a deadly profession. After more than six years of democratic rule, Iraqis who publicly express their views still do so at great peril."

Moayad al-Tiyib, a member of the Parliament’s Culture & Information Committee for the Kurdistan Coalition, said in a speech about al-Mahdi, “I demand to put an end for the state where Iraq continues to become a graveyard for media men and writers.”

== Personal ==
Hadi al-Mahdi had a wife and three children, who have all survived him.
