= Kazem Oraee =

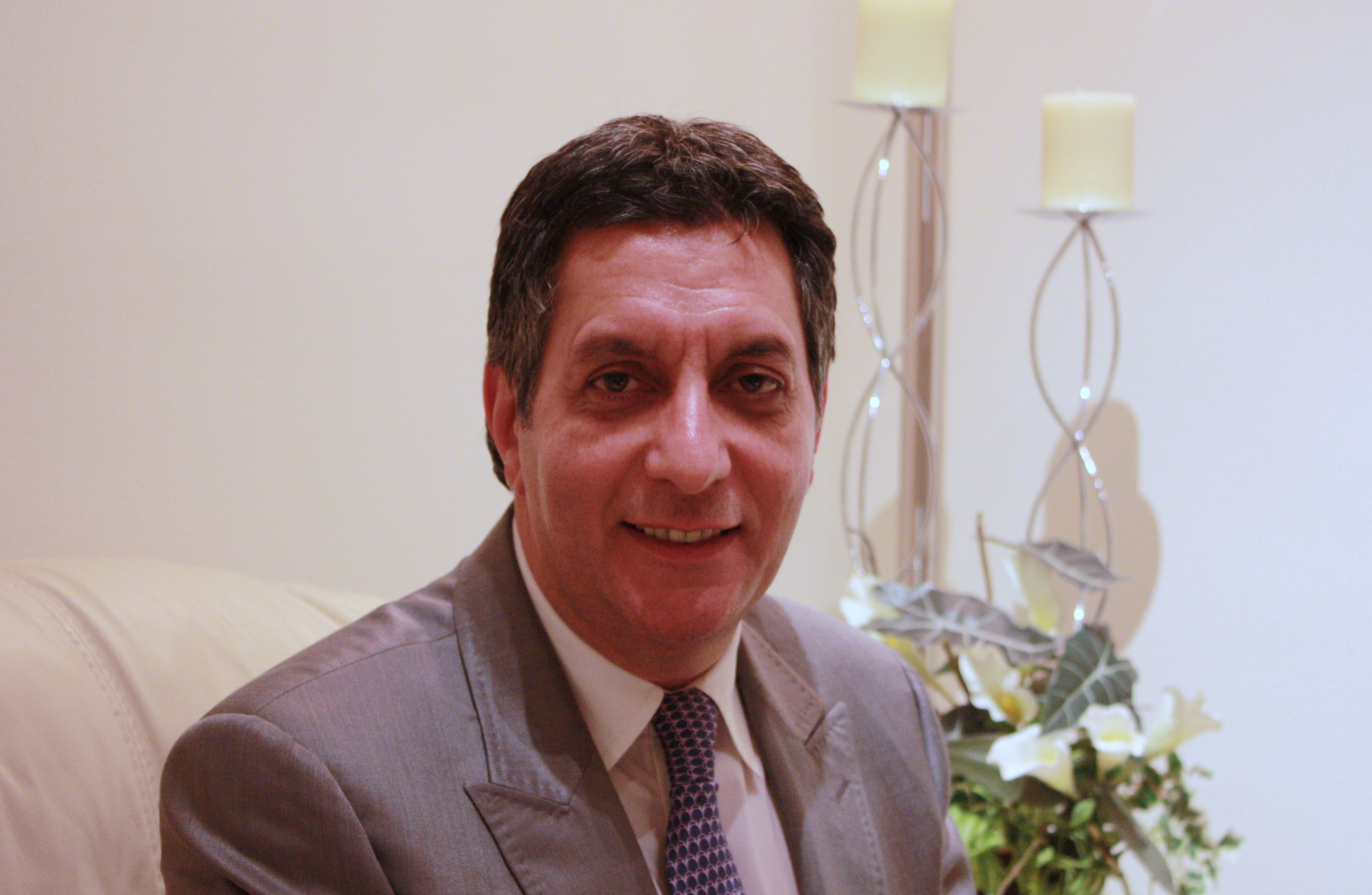
Kazem Oraee

Kazem Oraee Mirzamani (in Persian : کاظم اورعی میرزمانی) (born 1954 in Iran) completed his school education in Iran and university education in the UK. He received two first degrees in Mining Engineering (1978) and Mathematics (1981), a Master's degree in Technological Economics (1979) and a PhD in Economics of Mining (1983). Oraee has taught in several universities in Iran in the fields of Mining Engineering and Technological Economics.

== Academic activities ==
Oraee lectures at several universities in Tehran including Tarbiat Modarres, Amir Kabir and Azad Universities, and in Scotland he lectures in the University of Stirling, where he is an honorary professor. In addition to following the current global mining and technological advances, he contributes to research for which he has received several acknowledgments and recognitions. He also participates in mining conferences, including the annual International Conference on Ground Control in Mining, the SME prestigious 100 Years of Research, in which he gave three presentations and the MPES.

== Books ==
Oraee has written 17 books in the areas of Mining, Technological Economics, Economics, and Quantitative Management. and Adineh Books.

== Professional activities ==
Oraee acts as advisor to the provincial government of Khorasan and to the Ministry of Mines and Metals of Iran. He is a keen writer and contributes to specialised newspapers in technical issues such as mining, technological economics and macro economics. Thus he has grown into a controversial critic of the Iranian macro economic policies.

He currently chairs the board of directors for Jovein Cement Plc and Khorasan Gypsum Ltd.

== Awards and recognitions ==
Oraee was awarded the ‘Professor of the Year’ by the Ministry of Industries and Mines (2007), and the Ministry of Employment award of "The leading industrial job creator" the following year.

In 200, he was granted the Medal of Excellence from the Institute of Materials, Minerals and Mining, IOM3, for conspicuous contribution, either during the year or cumulatively over a number of years, to the art, science and practice of the mining industry. "He is known for his skill in combining the theoretical with the practical needs of society. He has concentrated on technological economics and has promoted best practice in mining in Iran. This involved fostering excellent links between the two countries, supporting the exchange of students and staff."
