= Killing of Muhamad Husain Kadir =

Muhamad Husain Kadir was an Iraqi prisoner killed in 2004. Private First Class Edward L. Richmond, a U.S. Army soldier, was convicted of manslaughter in relation to his death. Richmond was sentenced to three years in prison and a dishonorable discharge, as well as pay forfeiture and a reduction in rank.

== Incident ==
Richmond was a member of the Headquarters Company, of the 1st Battalion, 27th Infantry Regiment (United States), a unit of the 25th Infantry Division (United States)'s 2nd Brigade Combat Team. On February 28, 2004, Richmond's unit was conducting a cordon and search raid in a village near Taal Al Jai. Orders were to detain all male members of the village. A squad under Sergeant Jeffrey Waruch that included Richmond was to secure the perimeter of the village while the rest of their unit searched the houses. Waruch's orders to his squad were that they were authorized to shoot any military age men they saw fleeing the village, but, if he was nearby, to ask him first. Richmond saw elderly cowherd Muhamad Hussain Kadir outside the village, and asked Waruch if he should shoot him. Waruch decided to intercept and secure Kadir and ordered Richmond to help him.

Waruch found Kadir agitated, and initially struggled while he attempted to secure his arms with zip-ties. Arthur Rizer, writing in The Atlantic, reports that Waruch did tell Richmond to "shoot him if he moves." Kadir did calm down and Waruch was able to secure his arms. Richmond shot Kadir as Waruch lead him back to where the captives were being assembled. Richmond said he saw Kadir "lunge" at Waruch, although it is widely reported that Kadir merely tripped, and fell against Waruch. Richmond claimed he wasn't aware that Kadir's limbs were secured.

Waruch then said that he observed Richmond shooting Kadir in the back of the head.

Two unidentified government witnesses provided observations of what was believed to be Richmond's motives. One claimed that Richmond was overheard talking about killing Iraqis, the other that Richmond asked to kill Kadir prior to the orders to detain villagers. Richmond claimed that he never saw Kadir handcuffed, and was defending Sergent Waruch when Kadir was shot, claiming that Waruch ordered Richmond to "shoot him if he moves."

Richmond was acquitted of a more serious charge of unpremeditated murder, but convicted of voluntary manslaughter and sentenced to three years in prison. He was also demoted, received a dishonorable discharge, and ordered to forfeit all pay and allowance. He was released from prison on parole after serving two years of his sentence, an appeal was pending as of 2006.

In 2012 Arthur Rizer, reporting in The Atlantic, returned to this incident, citing it as an example of the problems of using combat troops in a police role. Rizer claimed that Richmond would have been treated much more leniently if he had been a police officer who had shot an innocent man he genuinely believed represented a threat. He wrote:

"According to the official standard currently followed by the FBI, the use of lethal force is deemed a "good shoot" when an "agent has a reasonable belief that the subject of such force poses an imminent danger of death or serious physical injury to the agent or another person" -- even if that "reasonable belief" turns out to be wrong. It is simply unreasonable to hold soldiers serving in a war zone to a higher policing standard than that to which we hold actual police officers serving U.S. cities."

== Aftermath ==
On January 22, 2024, Richmond was arrested in Baton Rouge, Louisiana, on charges of attacking police officers with a metal baton during the January 6 United States Capitol attack in 2021. On November 18, 2024, U.S. District Judge John Bates sentenced Richmond to four years and three months in prison. On January 20, 2025, the first day of the second presidency of Donald Trump, Richmond was pardoned along with nearly every other participant in the Capitol attack.
