= Mohannad =

Mohannad/Muhannad (also transcribed as Mohanad, Mohanned, Mohaned, or Muhanned

Arabic: مهند, lit. 'Indian', referring to a sword made from Indian steel) is a masculine Arabic given name.

Notable people with the name include:

== Given name ==
Mohanad

- Mohanad Salem (born 1985), Emirati footballer
- Mohanad Ali (born 2000), Iraqi footballer
- Mohanad Elshieky (born 1991), Libyan stand-up comedian

Mohaned

- Mohaned Alhouni (born 1996), Libyan professional pickleball player

Mohannad

- Mohannad Mahadeen (born 1973), Jordanian footballer
- Mohannad Mahdi Al-Nadawi (born 1975), Iraqi footballer
- Mohannad Nassir (born 1983), Iraqi footballer
- Mohannad Ibrahim (born 1986), Syrian footballer
- Mohannad Asseri (born 1986), Saudi footballer
- Mohannad Maharmeh (born 1986), Jordanian footballer
- Mohannad Abu Radeah (born 1986), Saudi footballer
- Mohannad Abdul-Raheem (born 1993), Iraqi footballer

Muhannad

- Muhannad (jihadist) (1969–2011), Russian jihadist
- Muhannad Al-Shawi (born 1974), Iraqi poet
- Muhannad Saif El-Din (born 1980), Egyptian fencer
- Muhannad El Tahir (born 1984), Sudanese footballer
- Muhannad Naim (born 1993), Qatari footballer
- Muhannad Al-Shanqeeti (born 1999), Saudi Arabian footballer

== Surname ==
- Mustafá Abdelsalem Mohand (born 1975), Spanish footballer
- Samir Si Hadj Mohand (born 1982), Algerian footballer

== Fictional characters ==
- Mohannad, the name of the main character Mehmet Şadoğlu (played by Kıvanç Tatlıtuğ) in the Arabic dub (known as Noor) of the Turkish TV series Gümüş

== See also ==
- Muhanad (disambiguation)
