= Mohammad Rahmati Sirjani =

Iranian Twelver Shi'a Marja' (born 1928)

Grand Ayatollah Haj Sheikh Mohammad Rahmati Sirjani
- آيت اللّه العظمى حاج شيخ محمد رحمتى سيرجانى
- Title: Grand Ayatollah

Personal life
- Born: 1928 Sirjan, Imperial State of Iran
- Parent: Hajj Abdullah Rahmati (father)
- Website: www.alrahmati.com

Religious life
- Religion: Islam
- Denomination: Twelver Shi'ism
- Jurisprudence: Jaʽfari
- Creed: Usuli

Muslim leader
- Based in: Qom, Islamic Republic of Iran

Grand Ayatollah Hajj Sheikh Mohammad Rahmati Sirjani (Persian: محمد رحمتی سیرجانی; born 1928) is an Iranian Twelver Shi'a Marja'.

He has studied in seminaries of Najaf, Iraq under Grand Ayatollah Muhsin al-Hakim and Abul-Qassim Khoei.

== See also ==
- List of maraji
