= Kazem Mohammad =

Iranian biostatistician and academic

- کاظم محمد
- Born: 1938 (age 87–88); Tehran, Iran

Academic background
- Education: Amirkabir University of Technology (BSc), University of California, Los Angeles (MSc, PhD)

Academic work
- Discipline: Biostatistics, Epidemiology
- Institutions: Tehran University of Medical Sciences

Kazem Mohammad (Persian: کاظم محمد; born 1938) is an Iranian biostatistician, epidemiologist, and academic. He holds the title of "Distinguished Professor" at the Tehran University of Medical Sciences (TUMS), representing the highest academic rank within the university system. He is widely recognized as a pioneer in establishing and developing modern biostatistics and epidemiology education in Iran.

== Early life and education ==
Kazem Mohammad was born in 1938 in Tehran. Mohammad began his higher education in engineering, earning a bachelor of science degree from Amirkabir University of Technology (formerly Tehran Polytechnic). Shifting his focus to health sciences, he moved to the United States to pursue graduate studies. He obtained both his master of science degree (MSc) and doctor of philosophy (PhD) in biostatistics from the University of California, Los Angeles (UCLA).

== Academic career ==
Upon returning to Iran, Mohammad joined the faculty of Public Health at Tehran University of Medical Sciences. He served as the head of the Department of Epidemiology and Biostatistics and played a key role in designing the curriculum for postgraduate biostatistics education in the country.

In recognition of his decades of service and scientific impact, he was awarded the title of Distinguished Professor (Persian: *Ostād-e Momtāz*). This designation is awarded to faculty members who have made exceptional contributions to their field.

== Research and impact ==
Mohammad's research focuses on the application of statistical methods in public health and the analysis of national health surveys. He has supervised numerous doctoral dissertations and has a significant publication record.

- He is a permanent member of the Academy of Medical Sciences of Iran.
- His research articles are indexed in major databases such as PubMed and Scopus, reflecting his contribution to medical literature.
- According to Google Scholar, his work has received significant citations, demonstrating his impact on the field of epidemiology in the region.
