= Mamadou Alimou Diallo =

Guinean footballer

Mamadou Diallo
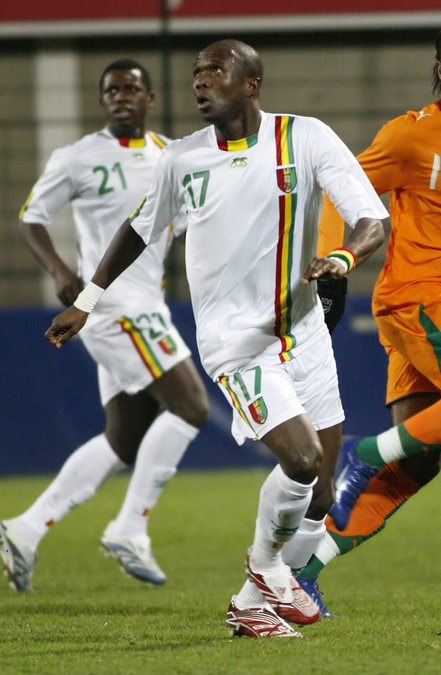
- Diallo in 2007

Personal information
- Full name: Mamadou Alimou Diallo
- Date of birth: 2 December 1984 (age 41)
- Place of birth: Conakry, Guinea
- Height: 1.86 m (6 ft 1 in)
- Position: Centre-back

Senior career*
Years	Team	Apps	(Gls)
2002–2003	Satellite		
2004–2007	Lokeren	50	(1)
2007–2009	Sivasspor	30	(1)
2009–2010	Diyarbakırspor	17	(1)
2010–2011	Sivasspor	12	(0)
2013–2014	AS Kaloum Star		

International career
2004–2011	Guinea	29	(1)
- * Club domestic league appearances and goals

Mamadou Alimou Diallo (born 2 December 1984 in Conakry) is a Guinean former professional footballer who played as a centre-back.
