= Mohammad Hadi Ghazanfari Khansari =

Iranian Twelver Shi'a Marja' (born 1957)

Grand Ayatollah Sayyid Mohammad Hadi Ghazanfari Khansari

Personal life
- Born: 1957 (age 68–69) Iran

Religious life
- Religion: Islam
- Sect: Shia; Twelver

Ayatollah Sayyid Mohammad Hadi Ghazanfari Khansari (Persian: السيد محمد هادي غضنفري خوانساري) (born 1957) is an Iranian Twelver Shi'a Marja'.

He has studied in seminaries of Qom, Iran under Grand Ayatollah Mohammad-Reza Golpaygani and Mohammad Ali Araki.
