= Mehmed Pasha =

Mehmed Pasha or Mehmet Pasha may refer to:

- Ayas Mehmed Pasha (1483–1539), Ottoman grand vizier
- Baltaci Mehmed Pasha (1662–1712), Ottoman grand vizier
- Bıyıklı Mehmed Pasha (died 1521), Ottoman vizier and east front commander
- Boynuyaralı Mehmed Pasha (died 1665), Ottoman grand vizier
- Çerkes Mehmed Pasha (fl. 1624–1625), Ottoman grand vizier
- Cerrah Mehmed Pasha (fl. 1598–1599), Ottoman grand vizier
- Damat Mehmet Ali Pasha (1813–1868), Ottoman grand vizier
- Dervish Mehmed Pasha (disambiguation)
- Elmas Mehmed Pasha (1661–1697), Ottoman grand vizier
- Emin Pasha (1840–1892), also known as Mehmet Emin Pasha, German physician who entered Ottoman service
- Emir Mehmed Pasha (fl. 1589–1600), Ottoman defterdar, governor of Egypt (1596–1598) and of Damascus (1599–1600)
- Gürcü Mehmed Pasha (died 1665), Ottoman grand vizier
- Hadım Mehmed Pasha (fl. 1622–1623), Ottoman grand vizier
- Haseki Mehmed Pasha (fl. 1648–1661), Ottoman governor of Egypt, Damascus, Baghdad, and Aleppo
- Koca Hüsrev Mehmed Pasha (1769–1855), Ottoman grand vizier and admiral
- İvaz Mehmed Pasha (died 1743), Ottoman grand vizier
- Izzet Mehmed Pasha (disambiguation)
- Kadri Pasha (1832–1884), Ottoman grand vizier
- Kâmil Pasha (1833–1913), Ottoman grand vizier
- Kara Mehmed Pasha (died 1619), Ottoman grand vizier and governor of Egypt, also known as Öküz Mehmed Pasha
- Kara Mehmed Pasha (died 1722), Ottoman governor of various provinces, including Egypt
- Karamani Mehmed Pasha (fl. 1477–1481), Ottoman grand vizier
- Kavalalı Mehmed Ali Pasha (1769–1849), better known as Muhammad Ali of Egypt
- Kıbrıslı Mehmed Emin Pasha (1813–1871), Ottoman grand vizier
- Koca Mehmed Nizamüddin Pasha (fl. 1429–1439), Ottoman grand vizier
- Köprülü Mehmed Pasha (1575–1661), Albanian Ottoman grand vizier
- Kurd Mehmed Pasha (died 1605), Ottoman governor of Egypt (1594/1595–1596) and of Aleppo
- Lala Mehmed Pasha (died 1595), Ottoman grand vizier
- Mehmet Pasha (mayor of Salonica), mayor of Ottoman Salonica in 1874
- Mehmed Ali Pasha (disambiguation)
- Mehmed Ali Pasha (marshal) (1827–1878), German-born Ottoman soldier
- Mehmed Emin Pasha (disambiguation)
- Mehmed Emin Âli Pasha (1815–1871), Ottoman grand vizier
- Mehmed Emin Rauf Pasha (1780–1859), Ottoman grand vizier
- Mehmed Fuad Pasha (1815–1869), Ottoman grand vizier
- Mehmed Ferid Pasha (1851–1914), Ottoman grand vizier
- Mehmed Hâdî Pasha (1861–1932), Ottoman general and statesman
- Mehmed Hasib Pasha (died 1870), Ottoman statesman
- Mehmed Necib Pasha (died 1851), Ottoman governor of Baghdad
- Mehmed Namık Pasha (1804–1892), Ottoman statesman
- Mehmed Riza Pasha (1809–1877), Ottoman military officer
- Mehmed Rashid Pasha (1824–1876), Ottoman governor of Syria and minister of foreign affairs
- Mehmed Rushdi Pasha (1811–1882), Ottoman grand vizier
- Mehmed Sadık Pasha (1825–1901), Ottoman grand vizier
- Mehmed Said Pasha (1830–1914), Ottoman grand vizier
- Mehmed Şakir Pasha (1855 – 1914), Ottoman, diplomat, historian and general
- Mehmed Selim Pasha (1771–1831), Ottoman grand vizier
- Mehmed Şükrü Pasha (1857–1916), Ottoman general
- Mehmed Talaat Pasha (1874–1921), better known as Talaat Pasha, Ottoman grand vizier
- Mehmet Vasıf Pasha Gürcü (died 1865), Ottoman field-marshal
- Muhammad Ali of Egypt (1769–1849), also known as Mehmet Ali Pasha, Albanian Ottoman commander
- Piri Mehmed Pasha (died 1533), Ottoman grand vizier
- Rami Mehmed Pasha (1645–1704), Ottoman grand vizier and poet
- Reşid Mehmed Pasha (1780–1839), Ottoman grand vizier
- Rum Mehmed Pasha (fl. 1466–1469), Ottoman grand vizier
- Saffet Pasha (fl. 1878), Ottoman grand vizier
- Sofu Mehmed Pasha (fl. 1648–1649), Ottoman grand vizier
- Sofu Mehmed Pasha (governor) (died 1626), Ottoman governor of Egypt, Rumelia, Sivas, and Budin
- Sokollu Mehmed Pasha (1506–1579), Ottoman grand vizier
- Sokolluzade Lala Mehmed Pasha (fl. 1604–1606), Ottoman grand vizier
- Sultanzade Mehmed Pasha (died 1646), Ottoman grand vizier
- Tabanıyassı Mehmed Pasha (died 1637), Ottoman grand vizier
- Tayyar Mehmed Pasha (died 1638), Ottoman grand vizier
- Veli Mehmed Pasha (died 1716), Ottoman Kapudan Pasha and governor of Bosnia and Egypt

== See also ==
- List of Ottoman grand viziers, the greatest minister of the sultan in the Ottoman Empire
- A number of rulers of Damascus were named Mehmed Pasha
- A number of colonial heads of Algeria were named Mehmed Pasha
- Mahmud Pasha (disambiguation)
- Mehmed (name)
- Pasha (title)
