= Mehmed =

- Pronunciation: Turkish: [mehˈmet] Bosnian: [ˈmɛxmɛd]
- Gender: Male
- Language: Turkish, Bosnian, Albanian, Crimean Tatar, Azerbaijani

Origin
- Meaning: Muhammad

Other names
- Alternative spelling: Mehmet
- Derived: Muḥammad, مُحَمَّد, from Ḥammada, "Praise", حَمَّدَ
- Related names: Muhammad, Mohd, Mahmud, Mamadou, Ma, Mu

Mehmed or Mehmet is the most common Turkish form of the Arabic male name Muhammad (Arabic: محمد) (Muhammed and Muhammet are also used, though considerably less) and gains its significance from being the name of Muhammad, the prophet of Islam. Originally the intermediary vowels in the Arabic Muhammad were completed with an e in adaptation to Turkish phonotactics, which spelled Mehemmed, Mehemed and the name lost the central e over time. Final devoicing of d to t is a regular process in Turkish. The prophet himself is referred to in Turkish using the archaic version, Muhammet. In Azerbaijani it is Məhəmməd.

The name Mehmet also often appears in derived compound names. The name is also prevalent in former Ottoman territories, particularly among Balkan Muslims in Albania, Bosnia and Kosovo. The name is also commonly used in Turkish culture in the form of Mehmetçik, meaning little Mehmet, for unranked soldiers.

== Given name ==
=== Mehmed ===
- Mehmed I (1382–1421), Ottoman sultan
- Mehmed II (1432–1481), Ottoman sultan (Fatih, "the Conqueror"1444)
- Mehmed III (1566–1603), Ottoman sultan
- Mehmed IV (1642–1693), Ottoman sultan (Avcı, "the Hunter")
- Mehmed V (1844–1918), Ottoman sultan
- Mehmed VI (1861–1926), 36th and last Ottoman sultan
- Mehmed I Giray (1465–1523), a khan of the Crimean Khanate in 1515–1523
- Mehmed Abdulaziz (1901–1977), Ottoman prince
- Mehmed Alagić (1947–2003), Bosnian soldier
- Mehmed Alajbegović (1906–1947), Bosnian politician
- Mehmed Ali Pasha (disambiguation)
- Mehmed Šakir Kurtćehajić (1844–1872), Bosnian journalist
- Mehmed Hulusi (1851–1907), Bosnian journalist
- Mehmed Alispahić (born 1987), Bosnian footballer
- Mehmed Baždarević (born 1960), Bosnian football manager
- Mehmed Bushati, Albanian Pasha
- Mehmed Emin (disambiguation)
- Mehmed Emin Pasha (disambiguation)
- Mehmed Ertuğrul Efendi (1912–1944), Ottoman prince
- Mehmed Handžić (1906–1944), Bosnian author
- Mehmed Janjoš (born 1957), Bosnian football manager
- Mehmed Kalakula, Albanian politician
- Mehmed Kodro (born 1967), Bosnian footballer and football manager
- Mehmed Malkoč (born 1990), Bosnian footballer
- Mehmed Orhan (1909–1994), Ottoman prince
- Mehmed Pasha (disambiguation)
- Mehmed Namık Pasha (1804–1892), Ottoman statesman
- Mehmed Reshid (1873–1919), Ottoman governor of the Diyarbekir Vilayet
- Mehmed Sadık Pasha (1825–1901), Ottoman statesman
- Mehmed Said Efendi (died 1761), Ottoman statesman
- Mehmed Selim Pasha (1771–1831), Ottoman statesman
- Mehmed Spaho (1883–1939), Bosnian politician
- Mehmed Talat, Ottoman Grand Vizier
- Mehmed Uzun (1953–2007), Kurdish writer

=== Mehmet ===
- Mehmet Ali Ağca (born 1958), Turkish gunman
- Mehmet Akgün (born 1986), Turkish-German footballer
- Mehmet Al (born 1983), Turkish footballer
- Mehmet Altan (born 1953), Turkish economist, columnist, and writer
- Mehmet Altınsoy (1924–2007), Turkish politician
- Mehmet Arif (disambiguation)
- Mehmet Aslantuğ (born 1961), Turkish actor
- Mehmet Ayberk Koşak (born 2001), Turkish artistic gymnast
- Mehmet Aydın (born 1943), Turkish politician
- Mehmet Aziz (malariologist), Cypriot malariologist
- Mehmet Aurélio (born 1977), Brazilian-born Turkish footballer
- Mehmet Batdal (born 1986), Turkish footballer
- Mehmet Baydar (1924–1973), Turkish assassinated diplomat
- Mehmet Boztepe (born 1988), Turkish-German footballer
- Mehmet Büyükekşi (born 1961), Turkish business man
- Mehmet Bölükbaşı (born 1978), Turkish footballer
- Mehmet Budak (born 1980), Turkish footballer
- Mehmet Cavit Bey (1875–1926), Turkish economist
- Mehmet Cesur (born 1982), Turkish Paralympian goalball player
- Mehmet Çetingöz (born 1991), Turkish wheelchair basketball player
- Mehmet Eren Boyraz (born 1981), Turkish footballer
- Mehmet Emin (disambiguation)
- Mehmet Emin Eğilmez (born 2003), Turkish para-athlete
- Mehmet Emin Toprak (1974–2002), Turkish actor
- Mehmet Esat Bülkat (1862–1952), Ottoman general
- Mehmet Çakır (born 1984), Turkish footballer
- Mehmet Cansun (born 1947), Turkish businessman
- Mehmet Coral (born 1947), Turkish novelist
- Mehmet Culum (born 1948), Turkish novelist
- Mehmet Zafer Çağlayan (born 1957), Turkish politician
- Mehmet Çekiç (born 1970), Turkish-French Paralympic alpine skier
- Mehmet Cemaleddin Efendi (1848–1917), Turkish judge
- Mehmet Çoban (1905–1969), Turkish wrestler
- Mehmet Çoğum (born 1983), Turkish footballer
- Mehmet Dinçer (1924–20??), Turkish former footballer
- Mehmet Dragusha (born 1977), Albanian footballer
- Mehmet Durakovic (born 1965), Australian footballer
- Mehmet Ebussuud el-İmadi, Ottoman jurist
- Mehmet Ekici (born 1990), German footballer
- Mehmet Ergen, Turkish theatre director
- Mehmet Eroğlu (born 1948), Turkish novelist
- Mehmet Eymür (1965–2024), Turkish intelligence official
- Mehmet Ferda (born 1963), British actor
- Mehmet Fuat Köprülü (1890–1966), Turkish politician
- Mehmet Güney (born 1936), Turkish judge
- Mehmet Günsür (born 1975), Turkish actor
- Mehmet Güreli (born 1949), Turkish writer
- Mehmet Gürs (born 1969), Turkish chef
- Mehmet Güven (born 1987), Turkish footballer
- Mehmet Hacıoğlu (born 1959), Turkish former football coach
- Mehmet Haberal (born 1944), Turkish surgeon
- Mehmet Hakkı Suçin, Turkish author
- Mehmet Hetemaj (born 1987), Finnish footballer
- Mehmet Vehib Kaçı, Ottoman general
- Mehmet Kaplan (born 1971), Swedish politician
- Mehmet Kara (born 1983), Turkish footballer
- Mehmet Sarper Kiskaç (born 1990), Turkish footballer
- Mehmet Konica, Albanian politician
- Mehmet Kurtuluş (born 1972), German actor
- Mehmet Kutay Şenyıl (born 1987), Turkish footballer
- Mehmet Leblebi (1908–1972), Turkish footballer
- Mehmet Mehdi Eker, Turkish politician
- Mehmet Müezzinoğlu (born 1955), Turkish physician, politician, and Minister of Health
- Mehmet Murat Somer (born 1959), Turkish author
- Mehmet Nas (born 1979), Turkish footballer
- Mehmet Niyazi (1878–1931), Romanian and Crimean Tatar poet
- Mehmet Okonsar (born 1961), Turkish-Belgian pianist
- Mehmet Okur (born 1979), Turkish basketball player
- Mehmet Oktav (1917–1996), Turkish wrestler
- Mehmet Osman, a fictional character from the BBC soap opera EastEnders
- Mehmet Oz (born 1960), Turkish-American government official, physician, and television presenter
- Mehmet Özal (born 1978), Turkish wrestler
- Mehmet Özdilek (born 1966), Turkish footballer
- Mehmet Özhaseki (born 1957), Turkish politician
- Mehmet Ozyurek (1949–2023), Turkish world record holder
- Mehmet Polat (born 1978), Turkish footballer
- Mehmet Sabancı (1963–2004), Turkish businessman
- Mehmet Sak (born 1990), Turkish footballer
- Mehmet Scholl (born 1970), Turkish-German footballer
- Mehmet Sedef (born 1987), Turkish footballer
- Mehmet Şimşek (born 1967), Turkish politician
- Mehmet Şenol Şişli, Turkish musician
- Mehmet Shehu (1913–1981), Albanian politician
- Mehmet Tahsini (1864–?), Albanian politician
- Mehmet Tanrısever (born 1953), Turkish film producer
- Mehmet Tarhan (born 1978), Turkish activist
- Mehmet Terzi (born 1955), Turkish long-distance runner
- Mehmet Tillem (1974–2019), Australian politician
- Mehmet Toner (born 1958), Turkish biomedical engineer
- Mehmet Topal (born 1986), Turkish footballer
- Mehmet Topuz (born 1983), Turkish footballer
- Mehmet Türkmehmet (born 1980), Turkish footballer
- Mehmet Nadir Ünal (born 1993), Turkish kickboxer and amateur boxer
- Mehmet Vasıf Yakut, Turkish Para Taekwondo practitioner
- Mehmet Yağmur (born 1987), Turkish basketball player
- Mehmet Yıldız (footballer) (born 1981), Turkish footballer
- Mehmet Yılmaz (disambiguation)
  - Mehmet Yılmaz (footballer born 1988), Turkish footballer
  - Mehmet Yılmaz (footballer born 1979), Turkish footballer
- Mehmet Yozgatlı (born 1979), Turkish footballer
- Kadızade Mehmet (1582–1635), Islamic preacher in the Ottoman Empire.

== Derived names ==
- Mehmet Akif
- Mehmet Ali
- Mehmet Emin
- Mehmethan (Mehmet + Han)
- Mehmetcan (Mehmet + Can)

== Surname ==
- Alp Mehmet (born 1948), British diplomat
- Billy Mehmet (born 1984), English-Irish footballer of Turkish descent
- Dave Mehmet (born 1960), English former footballer
- Naz Mehmet, a fictional character from EastEnders: E20

== See also ==
- Mehmetçik
- Mehmed Pasha (disambiguation)
- Mehmet of Karaman (disambiguation)
- Atçalı Kel Mehmet (1780–1830), a Zeybek who led a local revolt against Ottoman authority
- Mahammad
- Memet
