= Muhammad Ali's rise to power =

Establishment of Muhammad Ali's rule over Egypt

- Part of Ottoman wars in Africa and Muhammad Ali's campaigns Napoleonic Wars
- Massacre of the Mamelukes by Horace Vernet, 1819
Date	1803–1807
Location	Egypt
Result	Muhammad Ali's victory; Muhammad Ali Pasha becomes ruler of Egypt; Establishment of the Egypt Eyalet; End of Mamluk power in Egypt; Ottomans expelled from Egypt; The Egypt Eyalet becomes an autonomous Ottoman vassal and a de facto independent sovereign state

Belligerents
(Ottoman Empire) Ottomans	Albanian mercenaries	Mamluks	(United Kingdom) British Empire

Commanders and leaders
(Ottoman Empire) Koca Pasha	Muhammad Ali Pasha	Muhammad Alfi	(United Kingdom) Alexander Mackenzie-Fraser

Strength
Unknown	6,000 Albanian mercenaries	Unknown	5,000

Casualties and losses
Unknown	Unknown	3,000 Turkish-Egyptian Mamluks	950+ killed 200+ wounded 400 captured

Muhammad Ali rose to power in Egypt following a long, three-way civil war between the Ottoman Empire, Mamluks who had ruled Egypt for centuries, and Albanian mercenaries in the service of the Ottomans. The conflict ended in victory for the Albanians (from Rumelia) led by Ali.

The struggle occurred following the French invasion of Egypt by Napoleon. After the French were defeated, a power vacuum was created in Egypt. The Mamluks had governed Egypt before the French invasion and still retained power in the region. However, Egypt was officially a part of the Ottoman Empire and many Ottoman troops who had been sent to evict the French were still present.

== Albanians under Tahir rise and seize Cairo from Hüsrev Pasha ==
In March 1803, the British evacuated Alexandria, leaving a power vacuum in Egypt. Muhammad Bey al-Alfi (aka Alfi Bey) (1751–1807) had accompanied the British to lobby them to help restore the power of the Mamluks. In their attempts to return to power, the Mamluks took Minya and interrupted communication between Upper and Lower Egypt. About six weeks later, Koca Hüsrev Mehmed Pasha, the Ottoman governor of Egypt, was unable to pay all the troops under his command, so he attempted to disband his Albanian (Arnaut) bashi-bazouks without pay in order to be able to pay his regular Turkish soldiers. The Albanians refused to disband and instead surrounded the house of the defterdar (finance minister), who appealed in vain to Hüsrev Pasha to satisfy their claims. Instead, the pasha commenced an artillery bombardment from batteries located in and near his palace on the insurgent soldiers who had taken the house of the defterdar, located in the Azbakeya. The citizens of Cairo, accustomed to such occurrences, immediately closed their shops and armed themselves. The tumult in the city continued all day, and the next morning, troops sent by Hüsrev Pasha failed to quell it.

The Albanian commander, Tahir Pasha, then returned to the citadel, gaining admittance through an embrasure, and from there began a counter bombardment of the pasha's forces over the roofs of the intervening houses. Soon thereafter, Tahir descended with his guns to the Azbakeya and then laid close siege to the governor's palace. The following day, Koca Hüsrev Mehmed Pasha fled with his women, servants, and regular troops to Damietta along the Nile.

Tahir then assumed control of the government, but within 23 days encountered trouble due to his own inability to pay all of his forces. This time, it was Turkish troops who went without pay, and they in turn mutinied and assassinated him. During the course of the mutiny, the governor's palace was burnt and plundered. A desperate, prolonged, and confusing conflict then ensued between the Albanians and Turks, with the divided Mamluks oscillating between the two factions or attempting to regain power themselves.

== Muhammad Ali assumes control and captures Ahmed Pasha ==
Tahir was replaced as commander of the Albanians by Muhammad Ali, one of the regimental commanders. Fearing for his position with the Ottomans, he entered into an alliance with the Mamluk leaders Ibrahim Bey and Osman Bey al-Bardisi.

With Hüsrev Pasha fortifying himself at Damietta, the Turkish troops in the vicinity of Cairo acclaimed Muftizade Ahmed Pasha, the Ottoman mayor of Medina (and previously Damietta), as their new governor. Muhammad Ali, however, refused to surrender Cairo to him. In reordering his forces to meet the new threat, he also removed the Mamluks from Giza, where they had been invited by his predecessor, Tahir.

Muftizade Ahmed Pasha established himself at the mosque of Baybars, which the French had converted into a fortress, but was eventually besieged by Muhammad Ali and his Albanian troops in the citadel of Cairo and compelled to surrender. Among the prisoners, those Turkish troops who had been involved in the assassination of Tahir Pasha were put to death.

== Capture of Hüsrev and Damietta ==
Muhammad Ali gave control over the Cairo citadel to his Mamluk allies. Soon after, they marched against Hüsrev Pasha, who had been joined by a considerable number of Turks in a well-fortified position at Damietta. Hüsrev was defeated, captured, and brought to Cairo by the Albanians. The bashi-bazouks sacked Damietta, but Hüsrev was treated with respect.

== Trabluslu Ali Pasha attempts to regain control ==
Days later, Trabluslu Ali Pasha landed at Alexandria with a firman from the Ottoman Porte appointing him the new governor of Egypt, and assumed control of the remaining Turkish forces. He threatened the Mamluk beys, now virtual masters of Upper Egypt, as well as of the capital and nearly all of Lower Egypt. Muhammad Ali and his Mamluk ally, al-Bardisi, therefore descended on Rosetta, which had fallen into the hands of a brother of Trabluslu Ali Pasha. The town and its commander were successfully captured by al-Bardisi, who then proposed to proceed against Alexandria; his troops, however, demanded back-pay which he was unable to provide. During this delay, Trabluslu Ali Pasha destroyed the dykes between the lakes of Aboukir and Mareotis, creating a moat around Alexandria. Unable to proceed with operations against Alexandria, Al-Bardisi and Muhammad Ali returned to Cairo.

The troubles of Egypt were exacerbated by an insufficient flood of the Nile, resulting in great scarcity, aggravated by the onerous taxation the Mamluk beys were forced to resort to in order to pay their troops. Riots and violence continued in the capital, with the bashi-bazouks under little or no control.

Meanwhile, Trabluslu Ali Pasha had been behaving with brutality towards the French in Alexandria. He received written instructions from the Ottoman sultan, which in an effort to sow dissension and mistrust between Muhammad Ali Pasha and his Mamluk allies, he sent to Cairo and caused to be circulated there. The Ottoman sultan announced that the Mamluk beys could live peaceably in Egypt with annual pensions of fifteen purses and other privileges, provided the government returned to the hands of the Turkish governor. To this many of the beys assented, and in the process opened a rift with Muhammad Ali Pasha and the Albanians. The Mamluks had already been suspicious of their Albanian allies, having previously intercepted letters addressed to them from Trabluslu Ali Pasha, endeavoring to win their alliance as well.

Trabluslu Ali Pasha advanced towards Cairo with 3,000 men to discuss his resumption of control. The forces of the beys still with Muhammad Ali Pasha and their Albanian allies advanced to meet Trabluslu Ali Pasha at Shelqan, forcing the Ottoman governor to fall back on a place called Zufeyta.

At this point, the Albanians managed to seize Trabluslu Ali Pasha's transport boats, capturing soldiers, servants, ammunition, and baggage. They then demanded to know why he had brought such a large host with him, contrary to both custom and a prior warning to not do so. Finding his advance blocked, reluctant to retreat with his forces to Alexandria, and being surrounded by the enemy in any case, Trabluslu Ali Pasha attempted to give battle, but his men refused to fight. He therefore abandoned his troops and went over to the camp of the Mamluk beys. His army was eventually allowed to retire to Syria.

With Trabluslu Ali Pasha in the hands of the beys, a horseman was seen to leave his tent one night at full gallop, and it was discovered that he bore a letter to Osman Bey Hasan, the governor of Kine (Kucuk Kine, Turkey). This gave the Mamluks a welcome pretext to rid themselves of him. Trabluslu Ali Pasha was sent under an escort/ guard of forty-five men towards the Syrian frontier; about a week later, news was received that during a skirmish with some of his own soldiers, he had fallen mortally wounded.

== Return and flight of al-Alfi ==
The death of Trabluslu Ali Pasha produced only temporary tranquility. On February 12, 1804, the Mamluk leader Muhammad Bey al-Alfi returned from the United Kingdom, splitting the Mamluks into two parties, one gathered around al-Alfi and the other around al-Bardisi, the latter having by then gained an ascendency among the Mamluks. The guns of the citadel and of the palace were fired three times each in al-Alfi's honor at news of his return, but preparations were simultaneously begun to oppose him before he arrived in Cairo.

Al-Alfi's partisans gathered opposite Cairo and held nearby Giza, when Husain Bey, one of al-Alfi's relatives, was assassinated by emissaries of al-Bardisi. Muhammad Ali Pasha seized upon this as a pretext to restore order, and took possession of Giza, which was given over to his troops to pillage.

Unaware of these events, al-Alfi embarked at Rashid and made his way to Cairo. Encountering a party of Albanians south of the town of Manfif, he was surprised in an ambush and only escaped with difficulty. Al-Alfi then made his way to the eastern branch of the Nile, but the region had become dangerous and he fled to the desert. There he had several close escapes and at last secreted himself among a tribe of Bedouin Arabs at Ras al-Wgdi.

== Al-Bardisi and the Albanians fall out ==
In the meantime, the fortunes of Al-Alfi's main Mamluk opponent, Al-Bardisi, began to decline. In order to satisfy the Albanian troops' demands for pay, he gave orders to levy heavy contributions from the citizens of Cairo. That roused the citizenry to open rebellion. The Albanians, alarmed for their safety, assured the populace that they would not allow the public order to collapse, and Muhammad Ali issued a proclamation to that effect and offered other concessions to calm the public.

Although their demands for pay had been the cause for Al-Bardisi's onerous levies that led to the public disturbances, Muhammad Ali Pasha's proclamation and concessions resulted in the Albanian forces gaining in popularity amongst the citizens, at the expense of the Mamluks. They soon took advantage of the opportunity. Three days later (March 12, 1804) the Albanians attacked the houses of al-Bardisi, as well as that of the aged Mamluk leader Ibrahim Bey. Both barely managed to escape. Upon hearing of the attack on their leaders' houses, the Mamluks in the Cairo citadel opened an artillery bombardment on the houses of the Albanians which were situated in the Azbakeya; but, on hearing of the flight of their chiefs, they evacuated the citadel.

Muhammad Ali Pasha, on gaining possession of the Cairo citadel, proclaimed Mahommed Khosrev Pasha governor of Egypt. For one day and a half Khosrev enjoyed the title; then the friends of the late Tahir Pasha succeeded in killing him. Cairo immediately descended into violent chaos at the hands of the triumphant Albanians, who ransacked and looted the houses of the Mamluk chiefs, whose harems were met with no mercy at their hands.

The Albanians then invited Hurshid Ahmed Pasha to assume the reins of government, and he without delay proceeded from Alexandria to Cairo.

In the meantime, the forces of the partisans of al-Bardisi were ravaging the countryside a few miles south of the capital and intercepting the river borne corn supplies. Soon thereafter, they advanced to the north of Cairo and successively took Bilbeis and Kalyub, plundering both, destroying the crops, and slaughtering the livestock.

Cairo was in a state of tumult, suffering severely from a scarcity of grain, as well as from the heavy exactions of the pasha to meet the demands of his troops, whose numbers had been augmented by a Turkish detachment. The shops were closed, and the unfortunate people assembled in great crowds, crying Y Latif! Y Latif! (O Gracious ).

Events were then further complicated by the reappearance of al-Alfi, who joined forces with Osman Bey Hasan. Both Al-Alfi and Hasan had professed allegiance to the pasha, but they soon turned against him and advanced upon the capital from the south. Their forces clashed with those of Muhammad Ali Pasha, and managed to seize from him the two fortresses of Tur.

Muhammad Ali managed to speedily retake the fortresses in a night assault utilizing 4,000 infantry and cavalry. However, he was then forced to turn his attention northward, where the other Mamluks on that side of Cairo attacked and penetrated into the capital's suburbs. They in turn were defeated a few days later in a battle fought at Shubra, with heavy loss on both sides. This double reverse temporarily united the two Mamluk parties of al-Bardisi and al-Alfi, although the two chiefs remained personally antagonistic.

Al-Bardisi shifted his forces to the south of Cairo, and the Mamluks gradually retreated towards Upper Egypt. There, the governor sent against them three successive expeditions (one of which was commanded by Muhammad Ali Pasha), and many inconclusive battles were fought without decisive result.

During this period another calamity befell Egypt; about 3,000 Kurdish deli light cavalry arrived in Cairo from Syria. These troops had been sent for by Hurshid Ahmed Pasha in order to strengthen himself against the Albanians, but their arrival resulted in the immediate return of Muhammad Ali and his Albanians from their campaign against the Mamluks in the south.

The Delis, rather than aid Hurshid Ahmed Pasha, were the proximate cause of his overthrow. Cairo was ripe for revolt; Hurshid Ahmed Pasha was hated for his tyranny and extortion, and reviled for the misconduct of his troops, especially the Delis. The sheikhs enjoined the people to close their shops, and the soldiers clamored for pay. At this juncture a firman arrived from Constantinople conferring on Muhammad Ali the governorship of Jedda. Within a few days, however, he managed to seize Egypt instead.

== Muhammad Ali ousts Hurshid Ahmed Pasha ==
On May 17, 1805, the sheikhs, with an immense concourse of the inhabitants, assembled in the vicinity of the governor's residence, and the ulema, amid the prayers and cries of the people, wrote a statement of the wrongs which they had endured under the administration of Hurshid Ahmed Pasha. The ulema intended to go to the citadel and present the statement to the governor, but they were apprised of intended treachery on Hurshid Ahmed Pasha's part. The following day, after holding another council, they proceeded to Muhammad Ali and informed him that the people would no longer submit to Hurshid Ahmed Pasha. As related by Muhammad Ali, when asked whom they would have, they replied that they would accept Muhammad Ali Pasha himself to govern them according to the laws; for they saw in his countenance that he was possessed of justice and goodness. Muhammad Ali seemed to hesitate, and then complied, and was at once invested.

On this a bloody struggle began between the two pashas. Hurshid Ahmed Pasha, being informed of the insurrection, immediately prepared to withstand a siege in the Cairo citadel. Two chiefs of the Albanians deserted Muhammad Ali and joined Hurshid Ahmed Pasha's party, while many of his soldiers deserted him and went over to Muhammad Ali. Muhammad Ali's strength lay in the popular support of the citizens of Cairo, who looked on him as a savior from their afflictions; and great numbers armed themselves, and with the sayyid Omar and the sheikhs at their head, commenced to patrol and guarding the city at night.

On the 19th of the same month Muhammad Ali commenced a siege of Hurshid Ahmed Pasha in the citadel. A few days later, Hurshid Ahmed Pasha gave orders to cannonade and bombard the city. For six days the bombardment continued, while the citadel itself was subject to counter bombardment in turn from batteries located in nearby hills.

Muhammad Ali's position at this time became very precarious. His troops grew mutinous due to arrears in their pay; a lieutenant of Hurshid Ahmed Pasha, his silahdar, who had commanded one of the expeditions against the Mamluks, advanced to the relief of his commander; and the latter ordered the Delis to march to his assistance. The firing ceased on Friday, but began again on the eve of Saturday and lasted until the next Friday.

On the following day (May 28), news came of the arrival at Alexandria of a messenger from Istanbul. That night in Cairo presented a curious spectacle; many of the inhabitants, believing that this envoy would put an end to their miseries, fired off their weapons as they paraded the streets with bands of music. The silahdar, imagining the noise to be a battle, marched in haste towards the citadel, while its garrison sallied forth and began throwing up entrenchments in the quarter of Arab al-Yesgr, but were repulsed by the armed inhabitants and the Albanian soldiers stationed there. During this time the cannonade and bombardment from the citadel, and on it from the batteries on nearby hills, continued unabated.

The envoy brought a firman confirming Muhammad Ali Pasha as governor of Egypt, and ordering Hurshid Ahmed Pasha to go to Alexandria, there to await further orders; but this he refused to do, on the ground that he had been appointed by a Hatt-i Sharif. The artillery ceased firing on the following day, but the troubles of the citizenry were increased rather than lessened, for law and order suffered a near total breakdown. Murders and robberies were daily committed by the soldiery, the shops were all shut and some of the streets barricaded.

While these scenes were being enacted in Cairo, al-Alfi and his Mamluks were besieging Damanhur, and the other Mamluk beys were marching towards Cairo, Hurshid Ahmed Pasha having called them to his assistance. However, Muhammad Ali Pasha intercepted their advance and forced them to retreat.

Soon thereafter, a squadron under the command of the Turkish high admiral arrived at Aboukir Bay, with dispatches from the Ottoman sultan confirming the former envoy's firman, and authorizing Muhammad Ali Pasha to continue to discharge the functions of governor of Egypt. Hurshid Ahmed Pasha at first refused to yield; but at length, on condition that his troops be paid, he evacuated the Cairo citadel and embarked for Rosetta.

== Defeat of the Mamluks ==
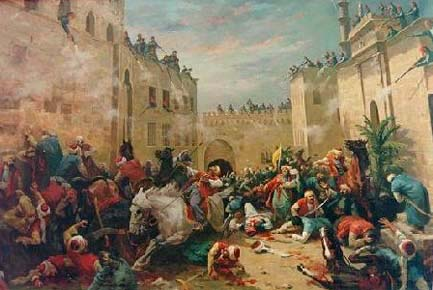
Massacre of the Mamluks at the Cairo citadel, painted by Horace Vernet.

Muhammad Ali now possessed the title of Governor of Egypt, but beyond the walls of Cairo his authority was everywhere disputed by the forces of the Mamluk beys, who were joined by the army of the silahdar of Hurshid Ahmed Pasha, as well as many Albanians who had deserted from his ranks.

A plan was soon conceived to destroy the Mamluk beys encamped north of Cairo. On August 17, 1805, they were informed that the dam of the canal of Cairo was to be cut, and some chiefs of Muhammad Ali's party wrote to the Mamluks, informing them that the Pasha would go there early that morning with most of his troops to witness the ceremony, thus presenting the Mamluks with an opportunity to enter and seize the city. To further the deception, the double agents negotiated for monetary rewards in return for providing more detailed information.

The dam, however, had been cut early in the preceding night, without any ceremony, and Muhammad Ali Pasha's forces were positioned to ambush the Mamluks. On the following morning, the Mamluk beys, at the head of sizeable forces, broke open the gate of the suburb Al-Husainia, and gained admittance into the city from the north through the gate called Bāb el-Futuh. They marched along the principal street for some distance, with kettledrums thudding behind each company, and were received with apparent joy by the citizens. At the mosque called the Ashrafia they separated, one party proceeding to the Al-Azhar Mosque and the houses of certain sheikhs, and the other continuing along the main street and through the gate called Bab Zuweyla, where they turned up towards the Cairo citadel. Here they were fired upon from the surrounding houses by forces loyal to Muhammad Ali Pasha, which was a prelude to a massacre of the ambushed Mamluks.

Falling back towards their companions, the Mamluks found the side streets blocked; and in that part of the main thoroughfare called Bain al-Kasrain they were caught between two fires. Thus shut up in a narrow street, some sought refuge in the collegiate mosque Barkukia, while the remainder fought their way through the encircling cordon, abandoned their horses, and escaped over the city-wall on foot.

Two Mamluks had in the meantime succeeded, by great exertions, in giving the alarm to their comrades in the vicinity of the Al-Azhar Mosque, thus enabling that faction to escape by the eastern gate called Bib al-Ghoraib.

A horrible fate awaited those who had shut themselves up in the Barkukia. Having begged for quarter first and surrendered, they were immediately stripped nearly naked, and about fifty were slaughtered on the spot, while about the same number were dragged away. Among them were four beys, one of whom, driven to madness by Muhammad Ali's mockery, asked for a drink of water; but when his hands were untied that he might take the bottle, he snatched a dagger from one of the soldiers, rushed at the pasha, and fell covered with wounds. The wretched captives were then chained and left in the court of the pasha's house; and on the following morning the heads of their comrades who had perished the day before were skinned and stuffed with straw before their eyes.

One bey and two others paid their ransom and were released; the rest were tortured and put to death in the course of the ensuing night. Eighty-three heads (many of them those of Frenchmen and Albanians) were stuffed and sent to Constantinople, with a boast that the Mamluk chiefs were utterly destroyed. Thus ended Muhammad Ali's first massacre of his too-confiding enemies.

The Mamluk beys appear to have despaired of regaining their ascendancy after this, and most of them retreated to Upper Egypt, from where attempts at compromise failed. Al-Alfi offered his submission on the condition of the cession of the Fayum and other provinces; but this was refused, and that chief gained two successive but indecisive victories over Muhammad Ali Pasha's troops, many of whom deserted to the Mamluks.

At length, after remonstrances had been received from the British and a promise had made by al-Alfi of 1500 purses, the Ottoman Porte consented to reinstate twenty-four Mamluk beys and to place al-Alfi at their head. This measure met with the opposition of Muhammad Ali, as well as the determined resistance of the majority of the Mamluks, who, rather than have al-Alfi at their head, preferred their present condition; for the enmity of al-Bardisi had not subsided, and he commanded the voice of most of the other beys.

Proceeding however with its plans, the Ottomans sent a naval squadron under Salih Pasha, shortly before appointed high admiral, which arrived at Alexandria on 1 July 1806 with 3,000 regular troops and a successor to Muhammad Ali, who was to receive the pashalik of Salonika.

Muhammad Ali professed his willingness to obey the commands of the Porte, but stated that his troops, to whom he owed a vast sum of money, opposed his departure. He induced the ulema to sign a letter, praying the sultan to revoke the command for reinstating the beys, persuaded the chiefs of the Albanian troops to swear personal allegiance to him, and sent 2000 purses contributed by them to Istanbul.

Al-Alfi was at that time besieging Damanhur, and he gained a signal victory over the Pasha's troops; but the dissensions of the Mamluk beys squandered their last chance at regaining power. Al-Alfi and his partisans failed to raise the sum promised to the Porte; Salih Pasha received plenipotentiary powers from Istanbul, but in consequence of the letter from the ulema; and, on the condition of Muhammad Ali's paying 4,000 purses to the Porte, it was decided that he should continue in his post as governor of Egypt, and the reinstatement of the beys was abandoned.

Fortune continued to favor Muhammad Ali, for in the following month al-Bardisi died, aged forty-eight years; and soon after, a scarcity of provisions caused al-Alfi's troops to revolt and mutiny. They reluctantly raised the siege of Damanhur, being in daily expectation of the arrival of a British army; and at the village of Shubra-ment, al-Alfi was struck by a sudden illness, and died on January 30, 1807, at the age of fifty-five. Thus was Muhammad Ali relieved of his two most formidable enemies; and shortly after he defeated Shahin Bey, with the loss to the latter of his artillery and baggage and 300 men killed or taken prisoners.

=== Fraser campaign ===
On March 17, 1807, a British fleet appeared off Alexandria, with nearly 5,000 troops, under the command of General Alexander Mackenzie-Fraser, and commenced the Alexandria expedition of 1807. The people of Alexandria, being disaffected towards Muhammad Ali, opened the city's gates to the British. Here they first heard of the death of al-Alfi, upon whose cooperation the expedition had counted for its success.

The British immediately despatched messengers to al-Alfi's successor and to the other Mamluk beys, inviting them to Alexandria. The British resident, Major Missett, having urged the importance of taking Rosetta and Rahmaniya in order to secure supplies for Alexandria, General Fraser, with the concurrence of the admiral, Sir John Thomas Duckworth, detached the 31st regiment and the Chasseurs Britanniques, accompanied by some field artillery under Major-General Wauchope and Brigadier-General Meade. Those troops entered Rosetta without opposition; but as soon as they had dispersed among the narrow streets, the local garrison opened a deadly fire on them from the latticed windows and the roofs of the houses. The British retreated towards Aboukir and Alexandria, with 185 killed and 281 wounded, General Wauchope and three officers being among the former, and General Meade and nineteen officers among the latter. The heads of the slain were fixed on stakes on each side of the road crossing the Azbakeya in Cairo.

Muhammad Ali, meanwhile, had been conducting an expedition against the Mamluk beys in Upper Egypt, and after defeating them near Asyut, he heard of the arrival of the British. Alarmed lest the surviving Mamluk beys should join the British, especially as they were already far north of his position, he immediately sent messengers to his rivals, promising to comply with all their demands if they should join him in expelling the invaders. His proposal being agreed to, both armies marched northwards towards Cairo on opposite sides of the river.

The possession of Rosetta being deemed indispensable, Brigadier-General Sir William Stewart and Brigadier-General John Oswald were sent there with 4,000 men. For thirteen days the town was bombarded without effect; and on April 20, news arrived from an advance guard at Al Hamed of sizeable reinforcements en route to rescue the besieged town. General Stewart was compelled to retreat, and a dragoon was despatched to Lieutenant-colonel Macleod, commanding at Al Hamed, with orders to fall back. However, the messenger was unable to penetrate the cordon around the British advance guard, by then besieged in Hamad, and the message was not delivered.

The advance guard in Hamad, consisting of a detachment of the 31st, two companies of the 78th, one of the 35th, and De Rolls regiment, with a picquet of dragoons, the whole mustering 733 men, was surrounded and, after a gallant resistance, the survivors, who had expended all their ammunition, became prisoners of war. General Stewart managed to regain Alexandria with the remainder of his force, having lost nearly 900 men. Some hundreds of British heads were now exposed on stakes in Cairo, and the prisoners were marched between the mutilated remains of their countrymen.

=== Reaction ===
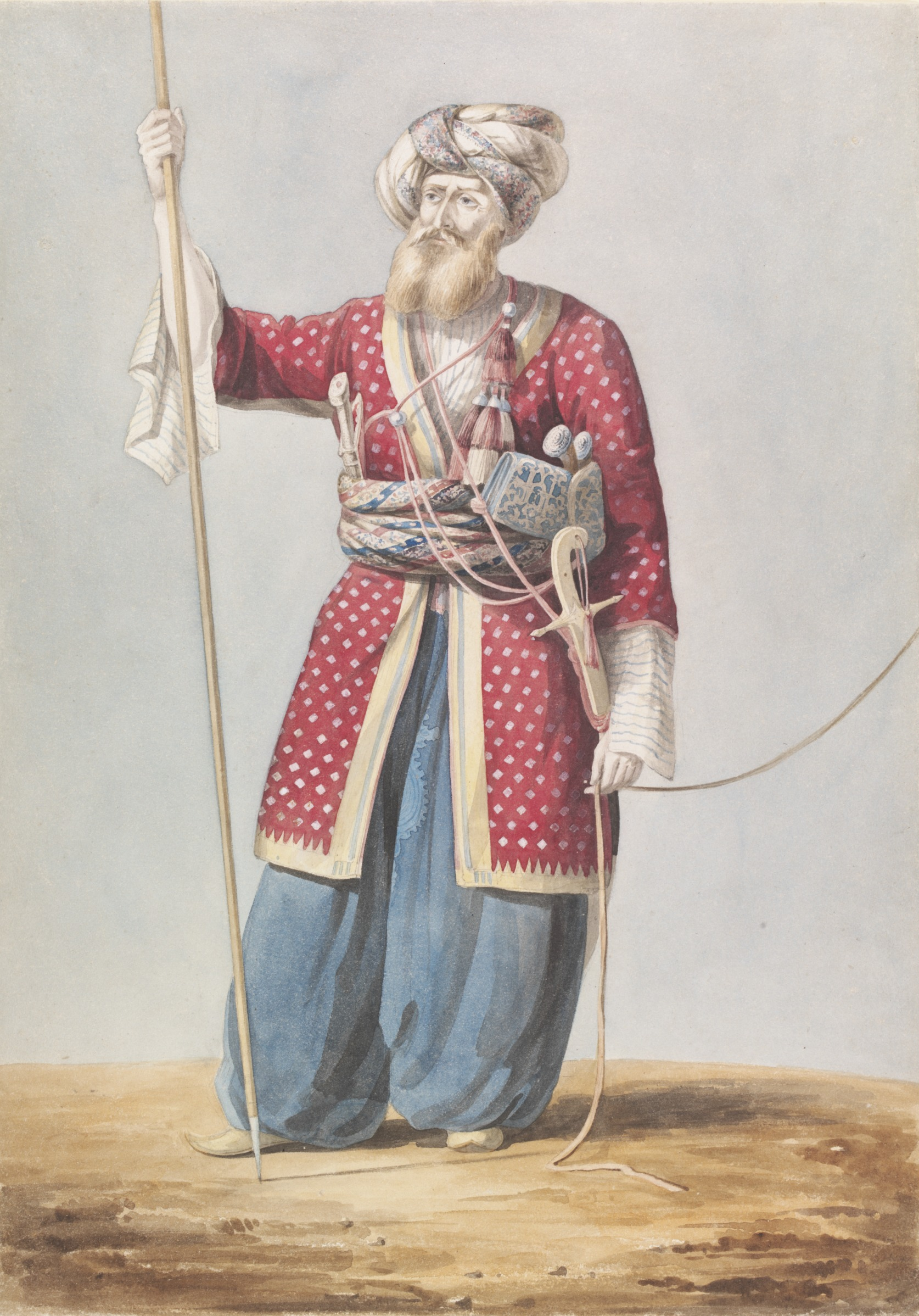
One of the last Mamluks, painted by William Page in 1816-1824

Divisions soon emerged within the ranks of the Mamluk beys, with one party desiring to cooperate with the British, and the other seeking to continue cooperation with Muhammad Ali Pasha. The dissensions proved ruinous to their cause; and General Fraser, despairing of their assistance, evacuated Alexandria on September 14. From that date to the spring of 1811 the Mamluk beys from time to time relaxed certain of their demands; the pasha on his part granted them some of what before had been withheld. The province of the Fayum, and part of those of Giza and Beni-Suef, were ceded to Shahin bey; and a great portion of the Said, on the condition of paying land-tax, to the others Mamluk beys. Many of them took up their abode in Cairo, but peace was not secured. Several times during that period Mamluk forces clashed with those of Muhammad Ali Pasha in indecisive battles.

Early in the year 1811, during a lull in tensions, after preparations for an expedition against the Wahhabis in Arabia were completed, all the Mamluk beys then in Cairo were invited to the ceremony in the Cairo citadel for investing Muhammad Ali's favorite son, Tusun, with a pelisse and the command of the army. On March 1, 1811, Shahin Bey and the other chiefs (with one exception) repaired with their retinues to the citadel, and were courteously received by the Pasha. Having taken coffee, they formed in procession, and, preceded and followed by Muhammad Ali's troops, slowly descended the steep and narrow road leading to the great gate of the citadel.

As soon as the Mamluks arrived at the citadel's gate it was suddenly shut before them. The last of those to leave before the gate was shut were Albanians under Salih Kush. To these troops, their chief now made known the Pasha's orders to massacre all the Mamluks within the citadel. They proceeded to climb the walls and roofs of nearby houses that hemmed in the road in which the Mamluks were confined, and some stationed themselves upon the eminences of the rock through which that road is partly cut. They then opened fire on their victims; and immediately the troops at the tail end of the procession, who also had the advantage of higher ground, followed suit. Of the betrayed chiefs, many were killed in the opening volleys; some, dismounting and throwing off their outer robes, vainly sought, sword in hand, to return and escape by some other gate. However, the few who gained the summit of the citadel experienced the same fate as the rest, for no quarter was given.

Four hundred and seventy Mamluks entered the citadel; and of these very few, if any, escaped. However, folklore has it that one of the Mamluk beys succeeded in escaping by leaping with his horse from the ramparts, and alighted uninjured although the horse was killed by the fall. Others say that he was prevented from joining his comrades, and discovered the treachery while waiting by the gate. He fled and made his way to Syria.

The massacre of the Mamluks at the Cairo citadel was the signal for an indiscriminate slaughter of the Mamluks throughout Egypt, orders to this effect having been transmitted to every governor. In Cairo itself the houses of the Mamluk beys were given over to the soldiery. During the two following days the Muhammad Ali Pasha and his son Tusun rode about the streets and tried to stop the atrocities; but order was not restored until 500 houses had been pillaged. The heads of the beys were sent to Istanbul.

== Final skirmishes ==
A remnant of the Mamluks fled to Nubia, and a tranquility was restored to Egypt to which it had long been unaccustomed.

In the year following the massacre the unfortunate exiles were attacked by Ibrahim Pasha, the eldest son of Muhammad Ali, in the fortified town of Ibrim, in Nubia. Here the want of provisions forced them to evacuate the place. A few who surrendered were beheaded, and the rest went farther south and built the town of New Dongola (correctly Dunkulah), where the venerable Ibrahim Bey died in 1816, at the age of eighty. As their numbers thinned, the surviving Mamluks endeavored to maintain their remaining power by training some hundreds of black people. However, soon it would all come to naught, on the approach of Ismail, another son of Muhammad Ali, who was sent with an army in 1820 to subdue Nubia and Sennar. At that point, some of the remaining Mamluks submitted, returned to Egypt, and settled in Cairo, while the rest, amounting to about 100 persons, fled in dispersed parties to the countries adjacent to Sennar.

== See also ==
- Fraser campaign
