= Izzet Mehmed =

Izzet Mehmed may refer to:

- Izzet Mehmed Pasha (1723–1784), Ottoman grand vizier (1774–75, 1781–82) and governor of Egypt (1775–78)
- Safranbolulu Izzet Mehmet Pasha (1743–1812), Ottoman grand vizier (1794–98) and governor of Egypt (1791–94)
- Topal Izzet Mehmed Pasha (1792–1855), Ottoman grand vizier (1828–29, 1841–42)

== See also ==
- Izzet
- Izzet Pasha (disambiguation)
- Mehmed
