= Özyürek =

Özyürek is a Turkish surname formed by the combination of the Turkish words öz ("gist; kernel") and yürek ("heart") and may refer to:

- Hande Özyürek (born 1976), Turkish violinist
- Mehmet Özyürek (1949–2023), Turkish physical attribute record holder
