= Mehmet Ali =

Mehmet Ali, Memet Ali or Mehmed Ali (/ɑːˈliː/) is a Turkish given name for males. People with the name include:

- Memet Ali Alabora (born 1977), Turkish actor
- Mehmet Ali Ağca (born 1958), Turkish assassin
- Mehmet Ali Aybar (1908–1995), Turkish sprinter
- Mehmet Ali Birand (1941–2013), Turkish journalist
- Mehmet Ali Erbil (born 1957), Turkish comedian
- Mehmet Ali İrtemçelik (born 1950), Turkish politician
- Mehmed Ali Gerede (died 1939), Turkish politician
- Mehmet Ali Pasha, various people
  - Muhammad Ali of Egypt (1769–1849), Albanian-Ottoman governor of Egypt
  - Çerkes Mehmed Ali Pasha (died 1625), Ottoman statesman and grand vizier
  - Mehmed Ali Pasha (1827–1878), German-born Ottoman soldier and marshal
  - Mehmed Emin Âli Pasha (1815–1871), Ottoman statesman and grand vizier
- Mehmet Ali Şahin (born 1950), Turkish politician
- Mehmet Ali Talat (born 1952), Turkish Cypriot politician
- Memet Ali, name variant

== See also ==
- Egyptian frigate Mehemet Ali (launched circa 1860)
- Ali (name)
- Mehmet (name)
- Muhammad Ali (disambiguation)
