= Kutay =

Kutay is a Turkish name, derived from Turkic roots. The name is composed of two elements: “kut,” meaning “blessed” or “holy,” and “ay,” meaning “moon.” As such, Kutay is often interpreted as “blessed moon” or “auspicious moon.”

The name may refer to:

- Ecmel Kutay, Turkish general
- Mehmet Kutay Şenyıl, Turkish footballer
