= Mohammed Pasha =

Mohammed Pasha may refer to:

- Muhammed Tewfik Pasha (1852–1892), khedive of Egypt and the Sudan and the sixth ruler from the Muhammad Ali Dynasty
- Muhammad Ali Pasha (1769–1849), Ottoman Albanian commander in the Ottoman army
- Sokollu Mehmed Pasha (1506-1579) Ottoman grand vizier of Croatian origin

== See also ==
- Mehmed Ali Pasha (disambiguation)
