= Battle of Provadia (1829) =

- Part of Russo-Turkish War (1828–1829)
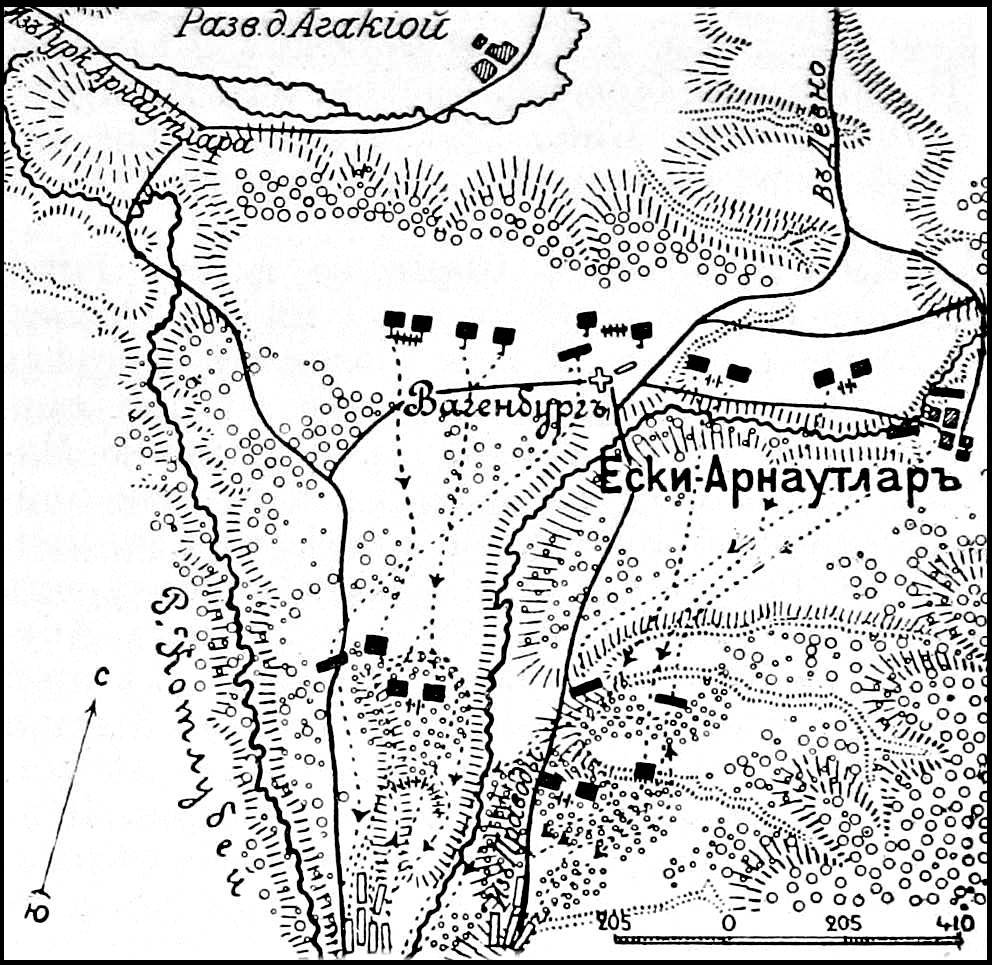
- Sketch of the Battle of Provadia
Date	17 May 1829
Location	Provadia, Ottoman Empire
Result	Inconclusive

Belligerents
Ottoman Empire	Russian Empire

Commanders and leaders
(Ottoman Empire) Reşid Mehmed Pasha	(Russian Empire) Loggin Roth (Russian Empire) Filadelf Ryndin

Strength
10,000 troops	10,000–15,000 troops, 16 guns

Casualties and losses
1,000–1,500 killed and wounded	1,000–1,500 killed and wounded

The Battle of Provadia was fought during the Russo-Turkish War (1828–1829). The Ottoman army under Grand Vizier Reşid Mehmed Pasha attacked the Russian forces commanded by General Loggin Roth near Provadia on 17 May 1829, but the assault ended inconclusively.

== Battle ==
In the spring of 1829, the 20,000–25,000-strong Ottoman army stationed at Shumen under Grand Vizier Reşid Mehmed Pasha decided to launch simultaneous attacks on the separated 6th and 7th Russian corps. To achieve this, Reşid Mehmed Pasha split his forces into two and moved on 10 May. The larger right wing advanced towards Provadia with 10,000 men, while the left wing moved through Yenipazar towards Provadia.

The operation against Provadia also threatened the Russian corps under General Roth's contact with the Danube River. On 17 May, the Ottoman corps reached near Provadia and attacked a six-battalion Russian corps equipped with 12 guns.

The Russian battalions under General Filadelf Ryndin suffered heavy losses, but when a Russian infantry battalion with four guns and two Cossacks regiments arrived from Devna, the front stabilized, and the Ottoman corps ceased their attack and withdrew to their original positions. Both sides suffered 1,000–1,500 casualties. General Rındin died of his wounds two weeks later.
