= Mahmud Pasha =

Mahmud Pasha or Mahmut Pasha may refer to:

== People ==
- Mahmud Pasha Angelović (1420–1474), Ottoman grand vizier (1456–68, 1472–74)
- Mahmud Pasha (governor) (died 1567), Ottoman governor of Yemen (1561–65) and Egypt (1566–67)
- Kara Mahmud Bushati, Pasha of Scutari (1778–96)
- Mahmud Dramali Pasha (c. 1780–1822), Ottoman governor of Morea
- Mahmud Nedim Pasha (c. 1818–1883), Ottoman grand vizier (1871–72, 1875–76)
- Mahmud Shevket Pasha (1856–1913), Ottoman grand vizier (1913), war minister, general, and founder of the Ottoman Air Force
- Çürüksulu Mahmud Pasha (1864–1931), Ottoman statesman, naval minister, and general
- Mahmud Kâmil Pasha (1880–1922), Ottoman general
- Mahmud Muhtar Pasha (1867–1935), Ottoman and Turkish soldier and diplomat
- Muhammad Mahmoud Pasha (1877–1941), two-time prime minister of Egypt
- Mahmud Pasha (admiral), mid 19th-century Ottoman grand admiral

== Places ==
- Zal Mahmud Pasha Mosque, an old Ottoman mosque located near the Eyüp Sultan Mosque in the Eyüp district of Istanbul, Turkey

== See also ==
- Mehmed Pasha (disambiguation)
- Mahmud
- Pasha
