= Akif =

Akif, Akef, Aakif or Aqif (Arabic: عاكف) is an Arabic masculine given name, meaning "focused, attached, intent, devoted".

It may also refer to one who sits in itikaf during the last 10 days of Ramadan, devoting oneself to ibadah during these days and staying away from worldly affairs. This name is mentioned in Sura Al-Baqara.

== Given name ==
- Akef Al-Fayez, Jordanian Politician
- Akif Šeremet, Bosnian communist
- Akif Pirinçci, German writer of Turkish origin

== Surname ==
- Mohammed Mahdi Akef, Egyptian Islamist
- Naima Akef, Egyptian belly dancer
- Mehmet Akif (disambiguation)
