= Izzet Pasha =

Izzet Pasha may refer to:

- Izzet Mehmed Pasha (1723–1784), Ottoman grand vizier (1774–75, 1781–82) and governor of Egypt (1775–78)
- Safranbolulu Izzet Mehmet Pasha (1743–1812), Ottoman grand vizier (1794–98) and governor of Egypt (1791–94)
- Topal Izzet Mehmed Pasha (1792–1855), Ottoman grand vizier (1828–29, 1841–42)
- Izzet Ahmed Pasha (1798–1876), Ottoman governor of various provinces
- Ahmad Izzat Pasha al-Abid (1851-1924), Ottoman Syrian bureaucrat and spymaster to Abdul Hamid II, known as 'Izzat Pasha the Arab' (Arap İzzet Paşa)
- Ahmed Izzet Pasha (1864–1937), Ottoman general and grand vizier (1918)
- Hasan Izzet Pasha (1871–1933), Ottoman general
- Yusuf Izzet Pasha (1876–1922), Ottoman general

== See also ==
- Izzet, a name
- Pasha, a title
