= Mehmed Riza Pasha =

Ottoman general

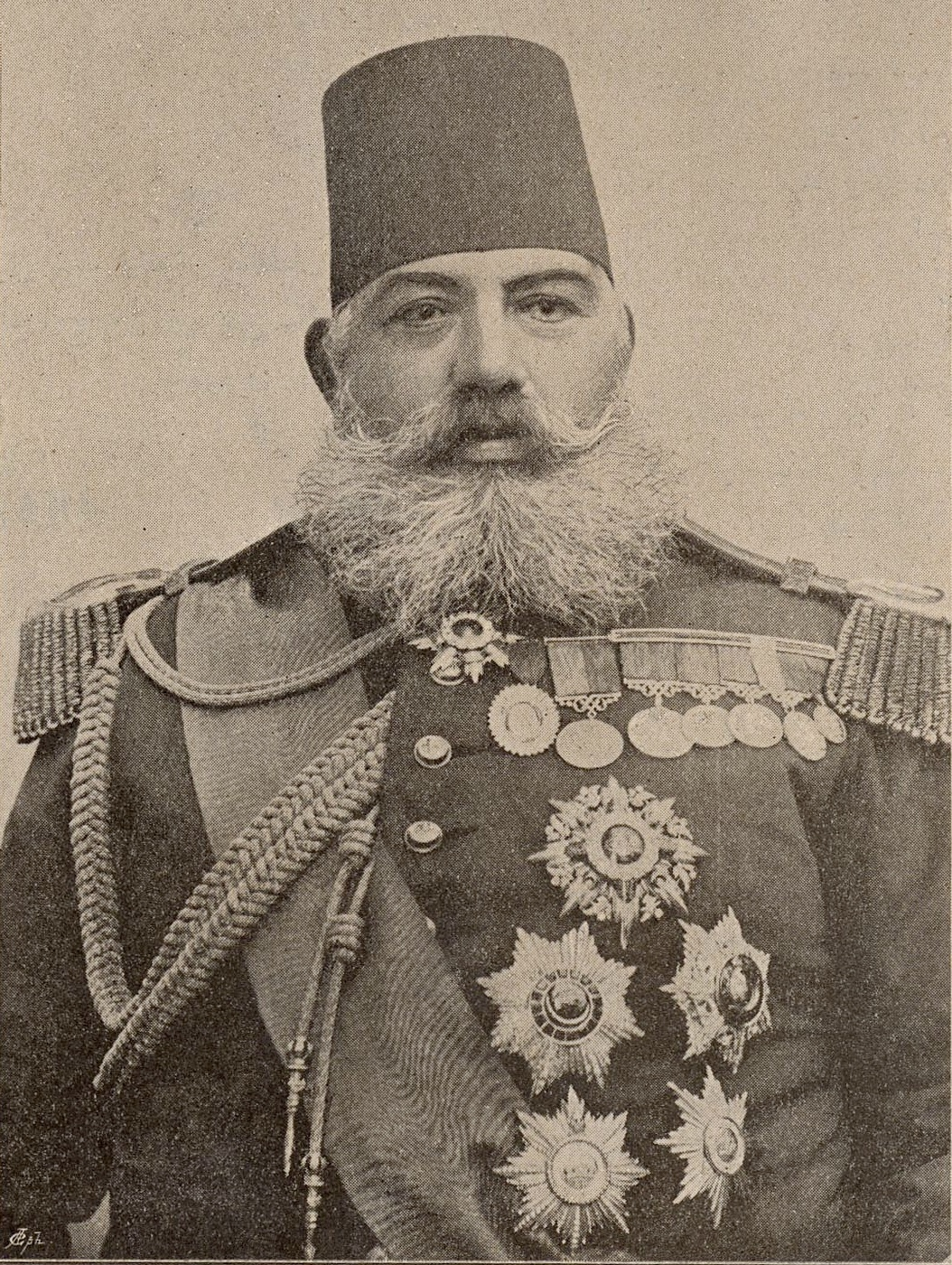
- Born: Mehmed Riza; 1844; Istanbul, Ottoman Empire
- Died: 1920 (aged 75–76); Istanbul, Ottoman Empire
- Military career
- Allegiance: Ottoman Empire
- Branch: Ottoman Army
- Rank: Serasker
- Conflicts: Russo-Turkish War (1877–78)

Mehmed Riza Pasha also known as Serasker Riza Pasha (Turkish: Serasker Mehmet Rıza Paşa; 1844–1920) was an Ottoman military commander. He achieved the rank of Serasker, the highest military rank of the Ottoman Empire. He participated in the Russo-Turkish War (1877–78).

== Career ==
He was born into a family of Turkish origin. In 1867, he graduated from Mekteb-i Harbiye with the rank of Mülâzımı.

He was exiled to France following the end of the Ottoman dynasty. He had three sons: Sureyya Pasha, Ziya Bey and Sukru Bey. Ziya Bey accompanied his father to France, where they resided in Nice. The home in Nice bears a plaque indicating his residence.

At the command of the 2nd Army, the 1st Regiment in Shumen was assigned to the 3rd Battalion and 4th Division. At the Ministry of War, he trained newly recruited rifles in Crete. He attracted the attention of the Governor and Commander of Crete Muşir Omar Pasha and was appointed chief master. However, two or three days later he resigned and returned to Istanbul.

In 1870, he was promoted to captain. In 1871, he took part in the suppression of the Malisör Rebellion in Shkodra. In 1874, he joined Şahin Pasha's retinue in the reorganization of the School of Medicine.

In 1875, he was promoted to major. Upon the outbreak of the Montenegrin rebellion, he served as the deputy battalion commander in Muğla in Trebin. Müşir Süleyman Hüsnü Pasha joined his entourage in the 93 War.

During the war, he was promoted to Kaymakam by Süleyman Hüsnü Pasha and was awarded Order of the Medjidie (4th rank). He was captured by the Russian Army during the Battle of Shipka Pass. After 6 months he returned to Istanbul. Due to his good relations with Süleyman Pasha, then detained in Istanbul, he was appointed to Liva Attorney General under the command of Emin Pasha, who was injured in Kosovo. When Emin Pasha was on the Greek border, he went to Yenişehir. During the collision with the Greeks there, he resigned from the military when he received a telegram from his family in Istanbul asking him to search his home. Circassian gave up his resignation at the request of Abdi Pasha.

In 1881, he was promoted to Miralay and appointed commander of the İzmit Redif Regiment. In 1885,, he transferred to Edirne with his regiment. He was summoned to the Yıldız Palace by Sultan Abdul Hamid II, who promoted him to Mirliva. He served as division commander in Edirne until 1888, when he was recalled to Istanbul to command the 2nd Guard Division. On 3 September 1891, he was promoted to Ferik and to Müşir, when he was appointed Serasker (Minister of War).

Mehmed Riza Pasha held the position of Serasker for nearly seventeen years, from 1891 until the Young Turk Revolution in July 1908. During his long tenure, he played a prominent role in the organization and expansion of the Hamidiye tribal cavalry corps in eastern Anatolia.

Following the Young Turk Revolution and the restoration of the Second Constitutional Era, he was removed from office. He passed away in Istanbul in 1920 and was buried in the courtyard of the Tomb of Sultan Mahmud II.

He was the commander of Fırka in Edirne between 1885 and 1888. In 1888 he was called to Istanbul and Sultan Abdul Hamid II assigned him to the command of the 2nd Firka tasked with the Guard. On 3 September 1891 he was promoted to Ferik and then to Mushir and appointed as Serasker. From September 5, 1891, to July 23, 1908, he served as a serasker.

He died in 1920. He is buried in the courtyard where the tomb of Mahmud II is located, along with other notables. His house survives on the Bosphorous.
