= Mehmet Akif =

Mehmet Akif is a Turkish masculine given name. Notable people with the name include:

- Mehmet Akif Ersoy (1873–1936), Turkish poet
- Mehmet Akif Pirim (born 1968), Turkish wrestler

== See also ==
- Akif
- Mehmet
