= Mehmed Emin Pasha =

Mehmed Emin Pasha may refer to:

- Kıbrıslı Mehmed Emin Pasha (1813–1871), Ottoman grand vizier (1854, 1859, 1860–61)
- Divitdar Mehmed Emin Pasha (died 1753), Ottoman grand vizier (1750–52)
- Yağlıkçızade Mehmed Emin Pasha (1724–1769), Ottoman grand vizier (1768–69)
- Mehmed Emin Âli Pasha (1815–1871), Ottoman grand vizier (1852, 1855–56, 1858–59, 1861, 1867–71)
- Mehmed Emin Rauf Pasha (1780–1859), Ottoman grand vizier (1815–16, 1833–39, 1841, 1842–46, 1852)
- Emin Pasha (1840–1892), Ottoman German physician, naturalist, and statesman

== See also ==
- Mehmed Emin (disambiguation)
- Mehmed
- Emin
