= Emin (given name) =

Male given name

- Gender: Unisex
- Language: Turkish

Other gender
- Feminine: Emina, Emine

Origin
- Origin: Arabic
- Meaning: Truthful

Other names
- Variant forms: Ermin; Amin

Emin is a Bosnian and Turkish masculine given name.

In the Balkans, Emin is popular among Bosniaks in the former Yugoslav nations. It is also popular among Albanians. The name is a modification to the name Amin, and it holds the same meaning: truthful. This region also has a female equivalent to the name: Emina (for example, Emina Zečaj).

== Given name ==
- Ahmet Emin Yalman (1888–1972), Turkish journalist
- Emin Ağayev (footballer) (born 1973), Azerbaijani retired footballer
- Emin Agalarov (born 1979), Azerbaijani singer and songwriter, known as Emin
- Emin Ahmadov (born 1986), Azerbaijani wrestler
- Emin Aladağ (born 1983), Turkish footballer
- Emin Amrullayev (born 1982), Azerbaijani minister of science and education
- Emin Azizov (born 1984), Azerbaijani wrestler
- Emin Cihangir Akşit (born 1953), Turkish major general and NATO official
- Emin Çölaşan (born 1942), Turkish investigative journalist
- Emin Duraku (1918–1942), Albanian communist
- Emin Fuat Keyman (1958-2024), Turkish political scientist
- Emin Garibov (born 1990), Russian artistic gymnast
- Emin Gök (born 1988), Turkish volleyball player
- Emin Guliyev (swimmer) (born 1975), Azerbaijani swimmer
- Emin Halid Onat (1908–1961), Turkish architect and former rector of Istanbul Technical University
- Emin Imamaliev (born 1980), Azerbaijani footballer
- Emin Jafarguliyev (born 1990), Azerbaijani footballer
- Emin Kadi, American fashion photographer, journalist, art director, and magazine publisher
- Emin Makhmudov (born 1992), Azerbaijani-Russian footballer
- Emin Milli (born 1979), Azerbaijani writer and dissident
- Emin Nouri (born 1985), Swedish-Turkish footballer
- Emin Fahrettin Özdilek (1898–1989), Turkish military officer and politician
- Emin Pasha (1840–1892), Egyptian physician, naturalist and governor
- Emin Quliyev (born 1977), Azerbaijani footballer
- Emin Sabitoglu (1937–2000), Azerbaijani composer
- Emin Bülent Serdaroğlu (1886–1942), Turkish footballer
- Emin Sulimani (born 1986), Austrian footballer
- Emin Toro (born 1974), American judge
- Mehmed Emin (disambiguation)
- Mehmed Emin Pasha (disambiguation)

== See also ==
- Emine
- Emin (surname)
- Emin (disambiguation)
