= Serasker =

Ottoman Empire military rank

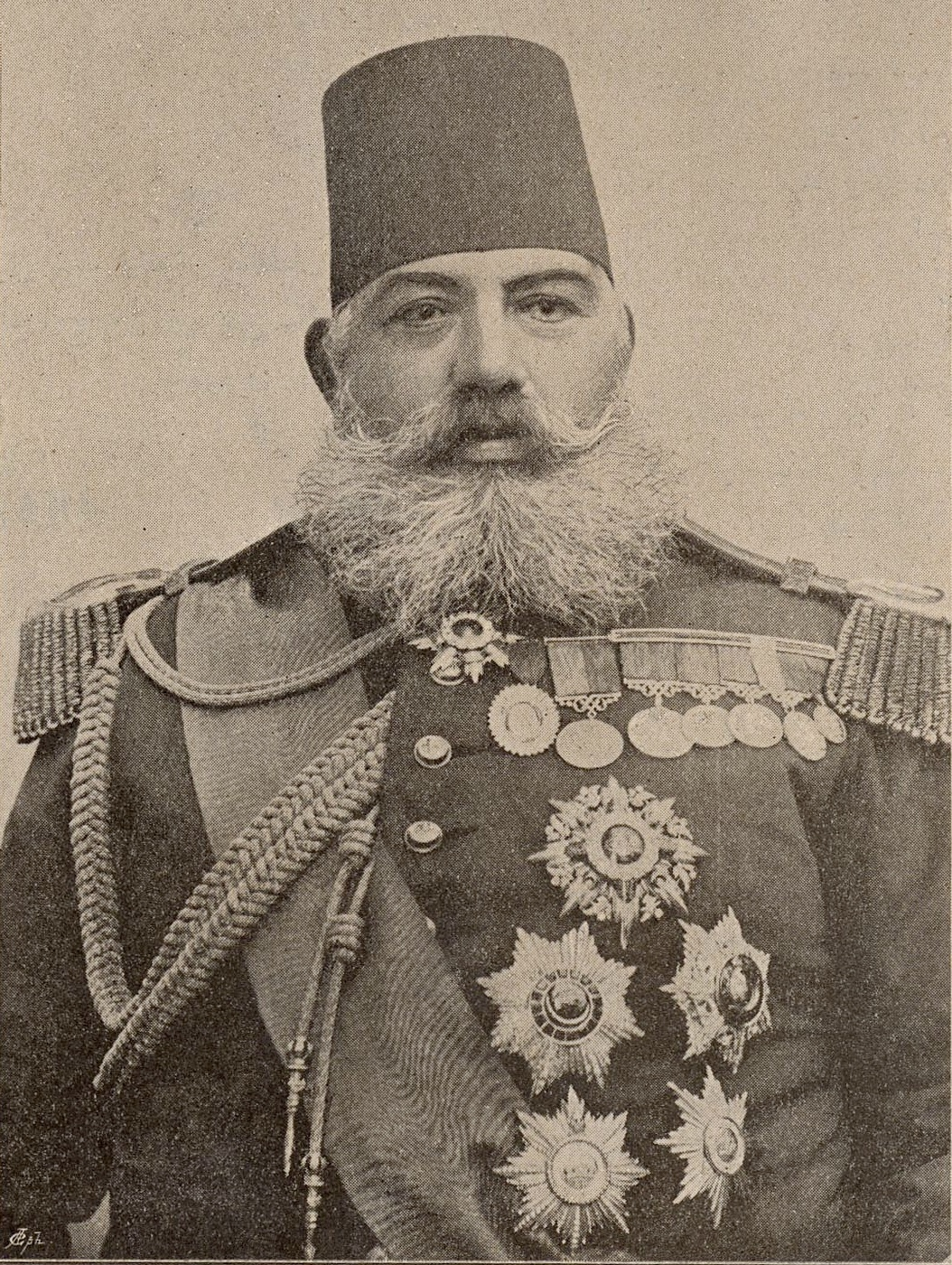
Serasker Mehmed Riza Pasha (1899)

Serasker, or seraskier (Ottoman Turkish: سرعسكر; Turkish pronunciation: [ˈseɾaskeɾ]), is a title formerly used in the Ottoman Empire for a vizier who commanded an army.

Following the suppression of the Janissaries in 1826, Sultan Mahmud II transferred the functions of the old Agha of the Janissaries to the serasker. The latter now became a distinct office at the head of the Ottoman military, combining the functions of a commander-in-chief and a minister of war. He also took over the Janissary Agha's former duties regarding the upkeep of order in Istanbul. Indeed, as the police system developed and expanded with the empire's progressive centralization, it became one of the main duties of the serasker until 1845, when policing became a separate agency.

The seat of the serasker and his department (bab-i seraskeri, or serasker kapısı—"Gate of the serasker") initially was in the Eski Saray, but these functions transferred to dedicated buildings in 1865. In 1879 the office was renamed to the Ministry of War (Harbiye Nezareti) until 1890, when it reverted to its old name; it was finally renamed again to Ministry of War in 1908.

Notable seraskers included:

- Admiral Koca Hüsrev Mehmed Pasha (1769–1855)
- Lala Mustafa Pasha (c. 1500 – 1580)
- Mehmed Namık Pasha (1804-1892)
- Pargalı Ibrahim Pasha (c. 1495 – 1536)
- Damat Rüstem Pasha (c. 1500 – 1561)
- Mehmed Riza Pasha (1844–1920)
