= Mehmet Emin =

Mehmet Emin or Mehmed Emin is a Turkish masculine given name, made up of the names Mehmed and Emin. People with the name include:

- Mehmed Emîn Bozarslan (born 1935), Kurdish writer
- Mehmet Emin Çolakoğlu (1878–1939), Turkish general
- Mehmet Emin Buğra (1901–1965), Uyghur politician
- Mehmet Emin Eğilmez (born 2003), Turkish para-athlete
- Mehmet Emin Eminov (1915–1970), Uyghur politician
- Mehmet Emin Karamehmet (born 1944), Turkish businessman
- Mehmet Emin Koral (1881–1959), Turkish general
- Mehmet Emin Resulzade (1864–1955), Azerbaijani statesman
- Mehmet Emin Toprak (1974–2002), Turkish actor
- Mehmet Emin Tokadi (1664–1745), Ottoman Sufi cleric
- Mehmet Emin Yurdakul (1869–1944), Turkish writer
- Mehmet Emin Yazgan (1876–1961), Turkish general
- Mehmed Emin Pasha (disambiguation)
