= Mehmet Arif =

Mehmet Arif or Mehmed Arif may refer to:

- Mehmed Arif Bey (1845–1898), Ottoman historian.
- Mehmet Arif Örgüç: "Hacı Arif" (1876–1940) military officer of the Ottoman Army and the Turkish army.
- Mehmet Arif Şenerim: (1877–1951) military officer of the Ottoman Army and a commander of the Turkish War of Independence.
- Mehmet Arif Bey: "Ayıcı Arif" (1882–1926) military officer of the Ottoman Army and a commander of the Turkish War of Independence.
- Mehmet Arif Ölçen: (1893–1958) military officer of the Ottoman Army and the Turkish Army.
