= Mehmet Yılmaz =

Mehmet Yılmaz may refer to:

- Mehmet Yılmaz (footballer, born 1979), Turkish footballer
- Mehmet Yılmaz (footballer, born 1988), Turkish footballer
- Mehmet Yılmaz (weightlifter) (born 1974), Turkish weightlifter
