= Emin =

Emin may refer to:

== As a name ==
- Emin (given name)
- Emin (surname)

== Places ==
- Emin County, county in Xinjiang, China
- Emin Minaret, the tallest minaret in China
- Emin Valley, on the borders of China and Kazakhstan
- Emin or Emil River, in Emin Valley

== Other uses ==
- Emin (esoteric movement)
- Emin (Ottoman official), an Ottoman tax-collector, holder of an Eminet
- Emin Agalarov, Azerbaijani-Russian singer and businessman, known mononymously as "Emin"

== See also ==
- Emin's gerbil
- Emin's pouched rat
- Emin's shrike
