= Emin (surname) =

Emin can be a surname of Arabic (Amin) origin.

Notable people with the surname include:

- Fedor Emin (1735–1770) Russian poet and novelist (original name Mahomet-Ali Emin)
- Ibrahim Emin (1963-2019), Soviet and Azerbaijani musician (original name Ibrahim Eminov)
- John Emin (born 1951), Australian rules footballer
- Joseph Emin (1726–1809), Armenian nationalist
- Mihail Eminovici (1850–1889), Romanian poet, philosopher, journalist and political activist. Considered to be one of the most salient figures in Romanian history.
- Tracey Emin (born 1963), British artist
- Viktor Car Emin (1870–1963), Croatian writer

== See also ==
- Emin (given name)
- Emin (disambiguation)
