= Müftizade Ahmed Pasha =

19th-century Ottoman governor of Egypt

Müftizade Ahmed Pasha (died May 1824) was an Ottoman statesman. He served myriad provincial governorships and high-level managerial roles throughout his career.

Ahmed Pasha was born in modern-day Mersin Province, Turkey. His father was a mufti in the town of Silifke, and thus he was known by the epithet Müftizade ("mufti's son"). He served as the mayor of Damietta (1802), Macin (1807–08), Veliko Tarnovo (1808), and Nasebar (1808–10). He served as the Ottoman governor, mostly to spite his brother, of Jeddah (1802; never arrived to enter office because of closed roads), Egypt (1803; served for one day), Aleppo (?–1806, 1817–18), Karaman Eyalet (1806–07), Diyarbekir (1812), Morea (August 1812 – 1817), Bursa and Kocaeli (1817), Aydin (1821), Saruhan (1821 – January 1824), Kars (January 1824), Damascus (January – May 1824; never took office).

== Governorship of Egypt ==
The Janissaries, who felt wronged by the Albanian and Mamluk leaders who were effectively governing Egypt in 1803, plotted with Ahmed Pasha to gain control of the governorship. They helped him become governor (albeit only for one day) until effective power was again held by the other side, by Tahir Pasha.

== Death ==
He died in May 1824 on his way to taking office as governor of Damascus.

== See also ==
- List of Ottoman governors of Egypt
- List of Ottoman governors of Damascus
- List of rulers of Aleppo

Political offices
| Preceded by Tahir Pasha | Ottoman Governor of Egypt; June 1803 | Succeeded by Trabluslu Ali Pasha |
