= Hande Özyürek =

Turkish classical violinist (born 1976)

Hande Özyürek (born 1976) is a Turkish violinist. She has been a member of the Munich Radio Orchestra since 2003 and has released a solo CD. She also teaches at the Mimar Sinan Fine Arts University. Özyürek was named the winner of the 15th Vienna Music Competition in 2007.

== Biography ==
Born in Istanbul in 1976, Özyürek began playing the violin at the age of 11. She studied violin with Çiğdem İyicil and composition with Cengiz Tanç at the State Conservatory of Istanbul Mimar Sinan Fine Arts University and graduated at the age of nineteen with the highest distinction. She continued her studies in Germany as a Turkish Education Foundation Scholar, studying with Lukas David and Tim Vogler at the Hochschule für Musik Detmold. She completed the soloist class with distinction under the guidance of Antje Weithaas and Joshua Epstein at the Music Academy in Saarbrücken. In 2013, she opened a Turkish restaurant in Herrsching am Ammersee.

== Career ==
Since her orchestra debut at the age of 16, Özyürek has performed as a soloist in Germany, Austria, France, Belgium, Italy, and Turkey; playing with major orchestras like the Brussels Philharmonic Orchestra (Belgium), the Mozart Symphony Orchestra (Germany), Plovdiv Philharmonic Orchestra (Bulgaria), Süd-West Deutsche Philharmonic, Istanbul State Symphony Orchestra, İzmir State Symphony Orchestra, Çukurova State Symphony Orchestra and Bursa State Symphony Orchestra, as well as the Başkent Academic Orchestra of Ankara and several chamber orchestras (Milli Reasürans, Borusan and Camerata Saygun).

Özyürek's achievements won her several awards, including the Sedat-Güzin Gürel Award, the Förderpreis Career Grant for Young Performers, and the Young Musician of the Year Award of the British Council. She took part in international competitions; winning second prizes in San Bartolomeo, Italy for violin in 2001 and for chamber ensemble in 2003. In 2003, Özyürek was awarded Junior Chamber International's Cultural Achievement Award in Turkey.

She participated in multiple international festivals such as the Bach Festival, Villingen-Schwenningen Music Festival, Ankara Music Festival, Istanbul International Music Festival and Eskişehir Music Festival.

Özyürek's first solo album, Face to Face with Saygun, was released in September 2007 by Kalan Müzik as a tribute to Turkish composer Ahmet Adnan Saygun on the occasion of the 100th anniversary of his birth. This CD features Saygun's complete violin-piano compositions as well as solo violin pieces by composers Özkan Manav and Babür Tongur, who were also students of Saygun.

== Awards ==
- 1995: Sedat – Güzin Gürel Art and Science Foundation Achievement Award (Istanbul, Turkey)
- 1996: Career Grant for Young Performers, The "Förderpreis" (Lüdenscheid, Germany)
- 1998: 4th prize in the violin competition of the Friedrich-Jürgen-Sellheim Foundation (Hannover, Germany)
- 1999: 2nd prize, the competition "Young Musician of the Year" (British Council)
- 2001: 4th prize, the International Chamber Music Competition 'Rovere d'Oro', Italy
- 2003: 2nd prize, the Music Competition 'Palmo d'Oro' (San Bartolomeo, Italy)
- 2003: The Cultural Achievement Award, Junior Chamber International
- 2007: 1st prize (recording), the 15th International Vienna Music Competition (Vienna, Austria)

== Discography ==
- Face to Face with Saygun (2007)
