= Mehmet of Karaman =

Mehmet of Karaman may mean:

- Mehmet I of Karaman (reigned 1261–1277), bey of Karamanid Principality
- Mehmet II of Karaman (reigned 1402–1423), bey of Karamanid Principality
- Karamani Mehmet Pasha (in office 1478–1481), grand vizier of the Ottoman Empire
