= Tahir Pasha (Egypt) =

Ottoman governor of Egypt

Tahir Pasha Pojani or Tahir Pasha born in Kavala as the son of Ahmed Bey from Pojan and Zohra Khanum, oldest sister to Muhammad Ali Pasha. His siblings was Ismail, Huseyin and Gülsün who was married with Mehmet Sabit Pasha. His son was Ahmed Tahir Pasha Pojani in Kavala, who was married with Hatice Khanum in Alexandria, she was a daughter of Nawab Mirza Shahmir Khan, the Bahadur of Oudh. He was the Albanian commander of bashi-bazouks under Koca Hüsrev Mehmed Pasha. He rebelled and assumed government of Cairo, becoming the acting Ottoman governor of Egypt on 6 May 1803. He was beheaded by a Janissary soldier within a month of acting as governor when he was unable to pay the troops their outstanding pay.

== Albanian commander ==
Tahir Pasha was the commander of the Ottoman Albanian troops sent by the Ottoman sultan in 1801 to fight against the French invasion of Ottoman Egypt under Napoleon. Although successful in ousting the French with significant help from the British, the Albanian troops, led by the other Albanian commander, his maternal Uncle Muhammad Ali, chose to remain in Egypt and gain influence for themselves.

== Cairo seized ==
In accordance with the Treaty of Amiens, the British evacuated Alexandria in March 1803 leaving a power vacuum in Egypt. Muhammad Bey al-Alfi had accompanied the British to lobby them to help restore the power of the Mamelukes. In their attempts to return to power, the Mamelukes took Minia and interrupted communication between Upper and Lower Egypt.

About six weeks later, the legitimate Ottoman governor of Egypt Koca Hüsrev Mehmed Pasha, finding himself in a financial bind and unable to pay all the troops under his command, attempted to disband his Albanian mercenaries or Albanian bashi-bazouks (or Arnauts) without pay in order to be able to pay his regular other Otomans soldiers. The Albanians, led by Tahir Pasha, refused to disband, and instead surrounded the house of the defterdar (finance minister), who appealed in vain to Hüsrev Pasha to satisfy their claims. Instead, the Pasha commenced an artillery bombardment from batteries located in and near his palace on the insurgent soldiers who had taken the house of the defterdar, located in the Ezbekia. The citizens of Cairo, accustomed to such occurrences, immediately closed their shops and armed themselves. The tumult in the city continued all day, and the next morning a body of troops sent out by Hüsrev Pasha failed to quell it.

Tahir Pasha then repaired to the citadel, gaining admittance through an embrasure, and from there began a counter bombardment of the pasha's forces over the roofs of the intervening houses. Soon thereafter, Tahir descended with his guns to the Ezbekia and then laid close siege to the governor's palace. The following day, Koca Hüsrev Mehmed Pasha fled with his women, servants, and regular troops to Damietta along the Nile.

== Acting Ottoman Governor of Egypt ==
After Koca Hüsrev Mehmed Pasha fled, Tahir assumed the government. The local judges confirmed him as kaymakam (acting governor) on 6 May 1803, (Note: Abd Al-Rahmann Al-Jabarti's History of Egypt states "The qadi produced a sable fur with which he invested Tahir Pasha as qa'im maqam, until such time as the governorship fell to him, or another governor should arrive.") largely because his Albanian troops were very loyal to him.

On May 19 there was a disturbance that resulted in the arrest beheading of Master Malati, also known as Moallem Malati, a Coptic Orthodox Church scribe of Ayyoub Bey El-Defterdar. He was one of the Mamluks of Muhammad Bey Abu al-Dhahab and was made general manager of a department to look after national problems when the French under Napoléon Bonaparte occupied Egypt. After the French left, the rulers of Egypt assumed the responsibility to protect Master Gergis El-Gohary, Master Wasef, and Master Malati. Malati was beheaded at Bab Zoweila in Cairo and subsequently canonized by the Coptic Orthodox Church.

Manipulated by his maternal Uncle Muhammad Ali, two Janissary chiefs confronted him for their jamakiya pay that he was unable to pay. The two drew their swords and rushed at Tahir, and one beheaded him.

A prolonged battled then ensued between the Albanians and other Ottoman troops, creating a chasm between the two leading forces. For a time, Mameluks oscillated between the two factions and also considered regaining power on their own behalf. His maternal Uncle Muhammad Ali, one of the regimental commanders, became the leader of the Albanians. Realizing he had a weaker position than the other Ottomans, Ali entered into an alliance with the Mameluke leaders Ibrahim Bey and Osman Bey al-Bardisi.

The two men that killed Tahir Pasha were sentenced to death.

== Funerary complex ==
In 1819 a funerary complex with a domed mausoleum was established in Cairo in the style of 15th century-Mamluk style architecture that was dedicated to Tahir and other family members. It is described in Islamic Art in the 19th Century as the first initiative of Mamluk revival in the 19th century.

== Notes ==
Political offices
Preceded by Koca Hüsrev Mehmed Pasha	Ottoman Governor of Egypt; 6 May 1803-ca. 29 May 1803	Succeeded by Müftizade Ahmed Pasha
