= Memet =

Memet is a form of the Arabic masculine given name Muhammad (Arabic: محمد). It is used in Turkey, Indonesia, and among Crimean Tatars and Yugurs. In China, since 2017, the only allowable form of Muhammad allowed to be given to children is Memet (Uyghur: مەمەت; Chinese: 买买提; pinyin: Mǎimǎití), the traditional Uyghur transliteration. Notable people with the name include:

== Given name ==
- Memet Ali Alabora (born 1977), Turkish film and theatre actor
- Memet-Abdulla Ezmat (born 1997), Chinese footballer
- Memet Kiliç (born 1967), Turkish-German lawyer and politician
- Memet-Raim Memet-Ali (born 2000), Chinese footballer
- Memet Molochnikov (1912–2003), Soviet commissar, partisan, and lawyer
- Memet Qubayev (1885–??), Soviet politician
- Memet Rochamat (1953/54–2010), Indonesian bureaucrat
- Memet Tanumidjaja (1915–2002), Indonesian police officer, politician, and diplomat

== Surname ==
- Madina Memet (born 1987), Chinese actress

== See also ==
- Mehmed
