= Topal Izzet Mehmed Pasha =

Grand Vizier of the Ottoman Empire

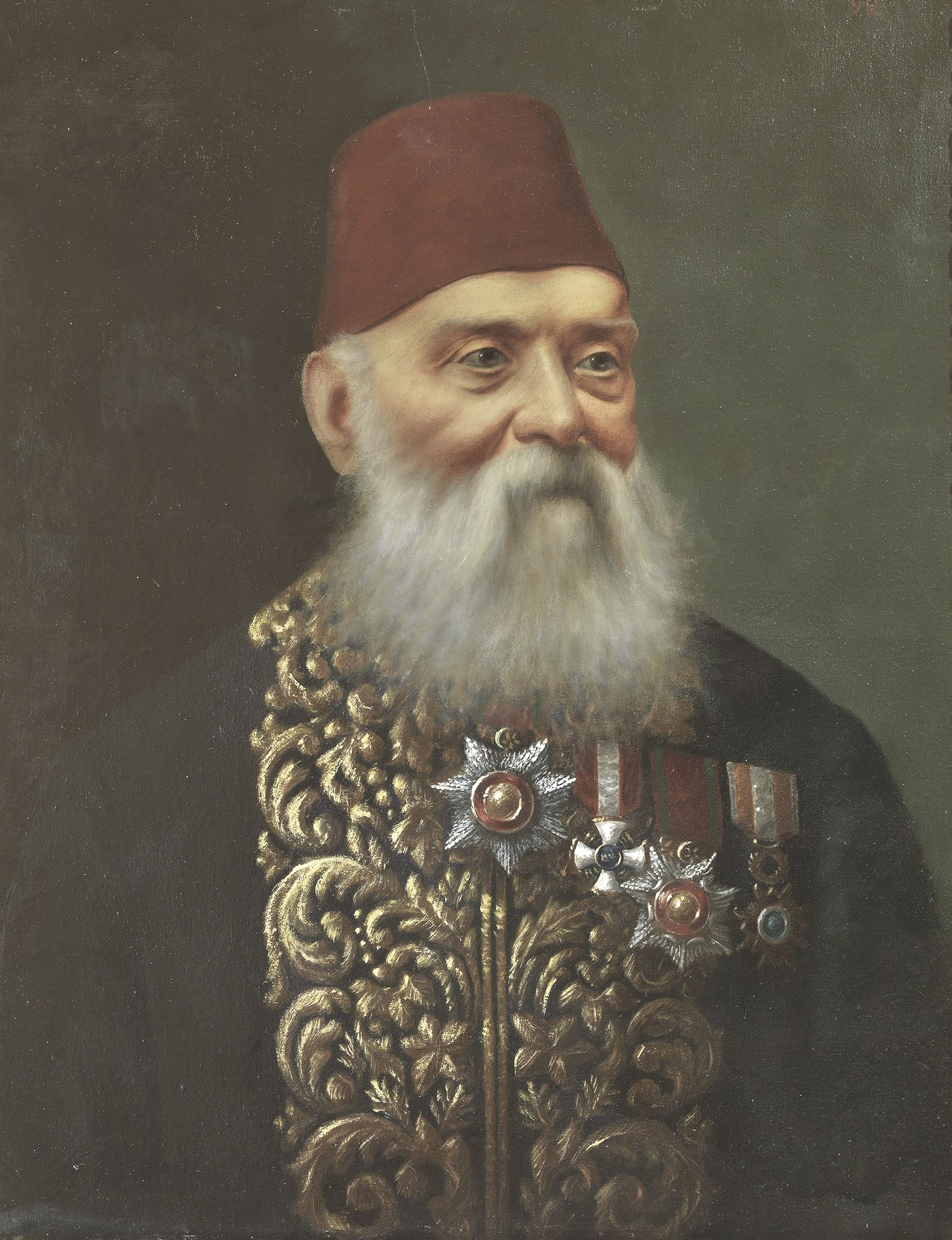

Grand Vizier of the Ottoman Empire
- In office 14 December 1841 – 30 August 1842
- Monarch: Abdulmejid I
- Preceded by: Mehmed Emin Rauf Pasha
- Succeeded by: Mehmed Emin Rauf Pasha
- In office 24 October 1828 – 28 January 1829
- Monarch: Mahmud II
- Preceded by: Mehmed Selim Pasha
- Succeeded by: Reşid Mehmed Pasha

Kapudan Pasha
- In office 1827–1829
- Preceded by: Koca Hüsrev Mehmed Pasha
- Succeeded by: Pabuççu Ahmed Paşa

Personal details
- Born: 1792 Darende, Sivas vilayet, Ottoman Empire
- Died: 7 March 1855 (aged 62–63) Istanbul, Ottoman Empire

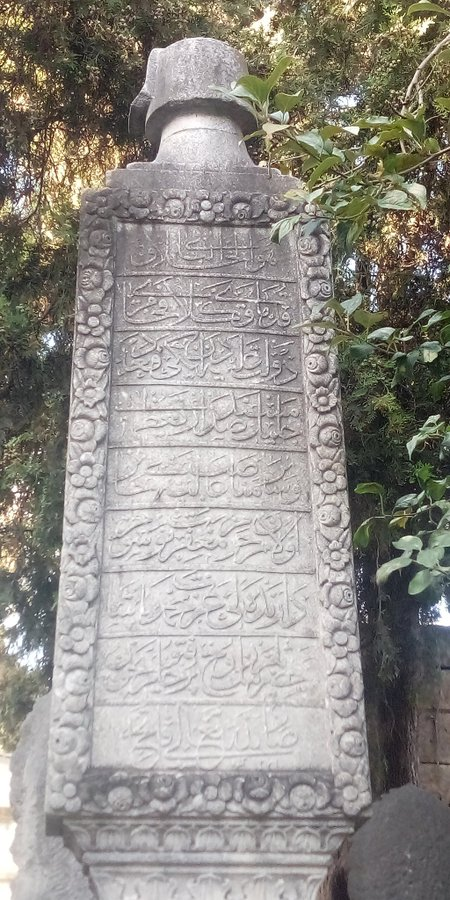
Tomb Stone of Topal Izzet Mehmed Pasha at Mihrişah Valide Sultan Cemetery in Eyüp Sultan

Topal Izzet Mehmed Pasha, Topal Izzet Pasha, or Darendeli Mehmed Pasha (Turkish: Darendeli Topal İzzet Mehmet Paşa; 1792–1855) was an Ottoman admiral and reformist statesman during the Tanzimat period. He was Grand Vizier of the Ottoman Empire during two terms: He was of Turkish origin.

- 24 October 1828 - 28 January 1829
- 7 October 1841 - 30 August 1842

Around 1840, he also served as the Kapudan Pasha (Grand Admiral) of the Ottoman Navy.

== See also ==
- Topal
