= Ferik =

Ferik may refer to:

- Ferik (rank), a military rank of the Ottoman Empire
- Ferik (village), a village in Armavir Province, Armenia
