= Mehmet Arif Şenerim =

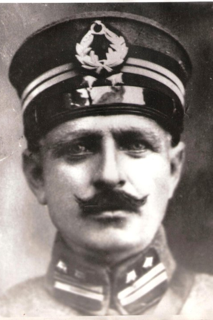
Mehmet Arif Şenerim

Mehmet Arif Şenerim (1877–1951) was a Turkish military leader active during the Balkan Wars, the First World War, and the Turkish War of Independence.

Mehmet Arif Şenerim was born in Boyabat in 1877, of the Çiloğullari family. His father was Çiloğlu İlyas and mother was Sara (Sahure). After completing his primary education in the Eyüp Military Primary School (1887–1891), in 1891 he enrolled with the Istanbul Soğuksu Military Junior High (1891–1894), then Kuleli Military High School in Istanbul. After graduating from Kuleli, he was admitted in 1894 to the Ottoman Military Academy in Istanbul, and graduated from this distinguished institution as a young infantry second lieutenant in on 5 January 1899.

After his graduation, he was stationed in Merzifon with the Fourth Army 75th Reg. 4th Batt. 1st Comp. In 1907 he was promoted to the rank of first lieutenant and was posted with the Alaşehir Reg. 2nd Batt. 4th Comp., then with the 72nd Reg. 3rd Batt.2nd Comp. which was stationed in Pirepol, Bulgaria. On 1 March 1910, he was promoted to the rank of captain and was posted with 66th Reg. 2nd Batt. 7th Comp. In 1911, he was stationed with 42nd Reg. 2nd Batt. 7th Comp.

== First Balkan War ==
At the outset of the First Balkan War, he was sent to the Greek front in Macedonia. He was the commander of 7th Company with 42nd Reg. 2nd Batt. in the Battles of Kiresne Yenicesi when he was taken as a prisoner of war by the Greeks in 1912. After being held captive for nine months in the town of Amolyas in the north of Thessaloniki, he escaped to join the 2nd Corps 13th Reg. 1st Batt. 1st Comp. as the commander of the company in Yenice, near Kırklareli.

== First World War ==
At the outset of the First World War, he was sent to the Gallipoli front to join the 5th Army under Marshall Otto Liman von Sanders. He was first stationed with 5th Division 15th Reg. 3rd. Batt. in Kadıköy, near Gallipoli in April 1915. He was the commander of the 9th Company of the 3rd. Batt. 15th Reg., together with 13th and 14th Reg., was ordered to reach Ariburnu front until 1 May and serve under Lt. Colonel Mustafa Kemal's 19th Division.

On 18 March 1915, when the English and French navies in an attempt to force their way up the Çanakkale Strait gave heavy losses, they decided to put units on land at Gallipoli Peninsula. The ANZAC forces which landed at Arıburnu on 25 April 1915 were stopped by the 19th Division under Mustafa Kemal's command at Conkbayırı. On 1 May 1915, the Kabatepe Battle (the 3rd Aribunu Battle) took place. Assault was ordered on ANZAC Corps under General Birdwood (and was formed with 1st Australian Division, 2nd Australian and New Zealand Division, Ceylon Battalion and Indian Battalion) at 5:00 a.m. Captain Mehmet Arif was with 15th Reg. that attacked from Merkeztepe and that formed the Center Arm. He was tasked to fortify the trenches and it was completed under the heavy fire of the ANZAC Corps. Another assault was ordered for the regiments in the center at 2:00 a.m. on 2 May 1915. The losses of 15th Regt that day and night were heavy: 12 officers and 920 privates. The commander of the 3rd Battalion died and Captain Mehmed Arif took command of the battalion. On the assault on 19 May 1915 he served under 5th Division of Hasan Basri. Without any gains, assaults turned into trench wars and continued on. Mehmet Arif served under 16th and 12th Divisions of Rüştü Bey, Abdülrezzak Bey and Refet Bey. He was wounded in the groin and taken to Moda hospital in Istanbul. He was discharged two and a half months later and joined his battalion. He was on the Left Arm with his 3rd Battalion during the Arıburnu Battles. He was honoured with the Silver War Medal and Merit Medal by Colonel Abdülrezzak Bey, Commander of the Ariburnu Front. Until the end of August 1915 he served in the trench wars on the Arıburnu front at Gallipoli.

In 1915 he was promoted to the rank of "Kolağası" (senior major) and was posted with the 14th Regt, which was stationed in Bitlis on the Eastern Front. In the assaults for recapturing the city from the Russian and Armenian armies, he assaulted on 1 March 1916 from the center and seized the locations of the Russians, liberating the city of Bitlis. Due to this heavy assault, Russian forces and their rearguards could not cling onto Bitlis, and withdrew to Kirkor mountains. Russians re-attacked with fresh forces from the right side of the battalion and the battalion withdrew to its initial location. He renewed the resistance from here until the Truce with Russia. On 1 Dec 1916 he was promoted to the rank of Major and delegated to the command of the 14th Regiment. He campaigned against the Armenian Army and surprised by attacking from the left side at the Peroz Battle. This prevented Armenians from capturing Ahlat and Karmuş. The Battles of Erciş, Adilcevaz, Pehmas and Rumya took place as guerilla wars. As Armenians captured many locations with small forces, there was no hinterland specified for any forces, so the regiments were mainly located together. At the Eastern Front (Bitlis Front) he served under Refet Bey, Alaettin Bey, Ali Fuat Bey, Sıtkı Bey, Mustafa Bey, again Sıtkı Bey and finally Kenan Bey.

At the Truce, 30 Oct 1918, he was honoured with the Merit Medal by Brigadier General Ali İhsan Pahsa. When the First World War ended, he was a prisoner of war. On his release he delegated to the command of the 24th Regiment which was stationed in Nusaybin on 1 June 1919, then he delegated to the command of the 14th Regiment which was stationed in Mardin on 1 December 1919. He intervened in the Rebellion of Nusaybin Ali Batı and Midyat to keep order.

== Turkish War of Independence ==
During the Turkish War of Independence, he served on the western front. He joined the Battles of Eskişehir, Karköy, Razancı, Mudanya and Bandırma with the Porsuk Platoon against the Greek armies. Turkish armies were victorious and the towns in the western Anatolia were liberated one by one. After the victory, he was honoured with Testimonial in 1923 when he was a major, and the same year he was promoted to the rank of lieutenant colonel. In 1925 he was honoured with the Medal of Independence. He built the first Army Guesthouse (Orduevi) in Konya. He retired in 1930 and settled in Konya.

== Personal life and death ==
He married twice. His first wife was Ayşe Hanım, who was the mother of Colonel Behzat Balkış, Pertev Çandar and Muzeyyen Hanim. Ayşe Hanım died in Nevrekop at age 30. His second wife was Zehra Hanım of Nevrokop, who is the mother of teacher Nergis Şenerim. Elder son of Mehmet Arif Şenerim, Colonel Behzat Balkış and his wife Mihriban Balkış had two sons—Orhan Balkış, who was a judge, died at the age of 44 and Alev Balkış. Orhan Balkış had two daughters named Nurdan Balkış and Melda Balkış Güner. Mehmet Arif Şenerim's second son Pertev Çandar had two sons named Güchan and Sühan Çandar. Mehmet Arif Şenerim's daughter Müzeyyen Hanım had two daughters named Nurtop and Aytop Yurdakul. Aytop Hanım married Colonel Hilmi Yurdakul and they had a son Dr. Süreyya Yurdakul and two daughters, Yasemin and Gül.

Mehmet Arif Şenerim died in Konya aged 74 and was buried at the Üçler Graveyard behind the Mevlana Museum.
