= Mehmed Emin Rauf Pasha =

Ottoman industrialist and statesman (1780–1860)

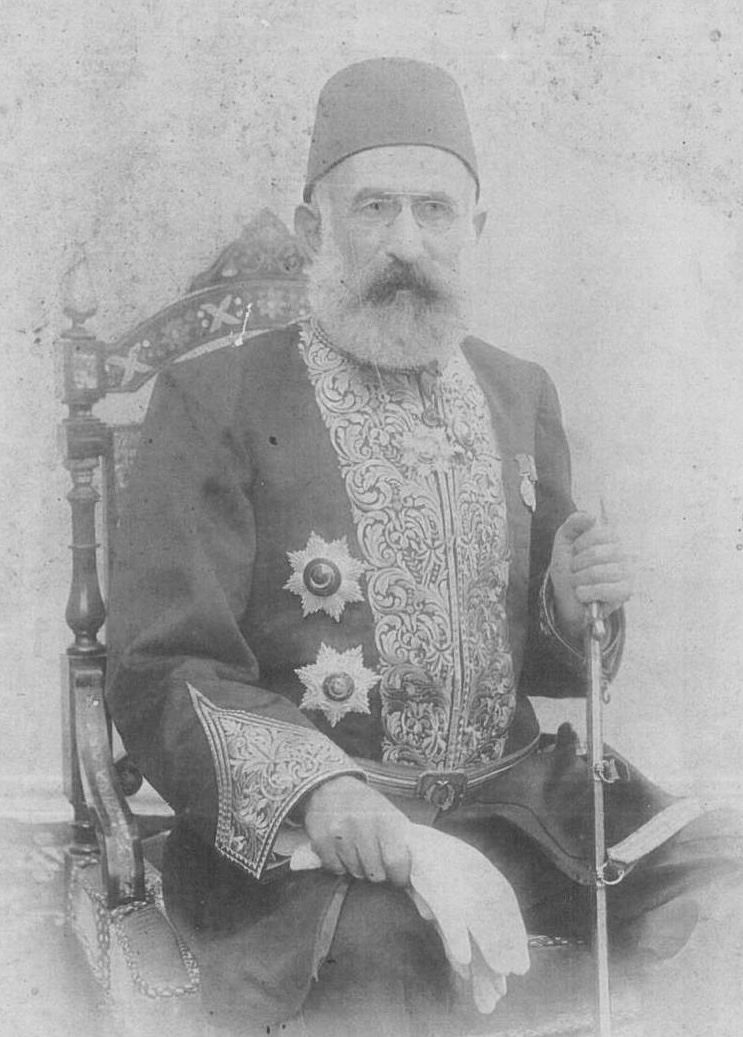

Grand Vizier
- In office 27 January 1852 – 7 March 1852
- Monarch: Abdülmecid I
- Preceded by: Mustafa Reşit Pasha
- Succeeded by: Mustafa Reşit Pasha
- In office 3 September 1842 – 31 July 1846
- Monarch: Abdülmecid I
- Preceded by: Topal Izzet Mehmed Pasha
- Succeeded by: Mustafa Reşit Pasha
- In office 29 May 1841 – 7 October 1841
- Monarch: Abdülmecid I
- Preceded by: Koca Hüsrev Mehmed Pasha
- Succeeded by: Topal Izzet Mehmed Pasha
- In office 17 February 1833 – 8 July 1839
- Monarch: Mahmud II
- Preceded by: Reşid Mehmed Pasha
- Succeeded by: Koca Hüsrev Mehmed Pasha

Governor of Damascus
- In office October 1828 – July 1831
- Appointed by: Topal Izzet Mehmed Pasha
- Preceded by: Salih Pasha
- Succeeded by: Mehmed Selim Pasha

Grand Vizier
- In office 30 March 1815 – 6 January 1818
- Monarch: Mahmud II
- Preceded by: Hurshid Pasha
- Succeeded by: Dervish Mehmed Pasha

Personal details
- Born: 1780
- Died: 1860 (aged 79–80)
- Spouse(s): Hemnam Hanım; Emine Hanım; Refet Hanım; Mümtaz Hanım; Gamzesaz Hanım

Mehmed Emin Rauf Pasha (1780–1860) was an Ottoman industrialist and statesman, who was Grand Vizier of the Ottoman Empire twice under Mahmud II (reign 1808–1839) and three times under Abdülmecit I (reign 1839–1861) during the Tanzimat period.

According to Shaw and Shaw, Mehmed Emin Rauf Pasha and his predecessor, Mustafa Reşit Pasha, "acted mainly as mediators" for Mahmud II, "attempting to balance conflicting interests while participating in the factional activities and disputes endemic in Ottoman governmental life."

Political offices
Preceded by Hurshid Pasha	Grand Vizier of the Ottoman Empire; 30 March 1815 - 6 January 1818	Succeeded by Dervish Mehmed Pasha
Preceded by Salih Pasha	Wali Of Damascus; October 1828 - July 1831	Succeeded by Mehmed Selim Pasha
Preceded by Reşid Mehmed Pasha	Grand Vizier of the Ottoman Empire; 17 February 1833 - 8 July 1839	Succeeded by Koca Hüsrev Mehmed Pasha
Preceded by Koca Hüsrev Mehmed Pasha	Grand Vizier of the Ottoman Empire; 29 May 1841 - 7 October 1841	Succeeded by Topal Izzet Pasha
Preceded by Topal Izzet Pasha	Grand Vizier of the Ottoman Empire; 3 September 1842 - 31 July 1846	Succeeded by Mustafa Reşit Pasha
Preceded by Mustafa Reşit Pasha	Grand Vizier of the Ottoman Empire; 27 January 1852 - 7 March 1852	Succeeded by Mustafa Reşit Pasha
