= Reşid Mehmed Pasha =

Grand Vizier of the Ottoman Empire from 1829 to 1833

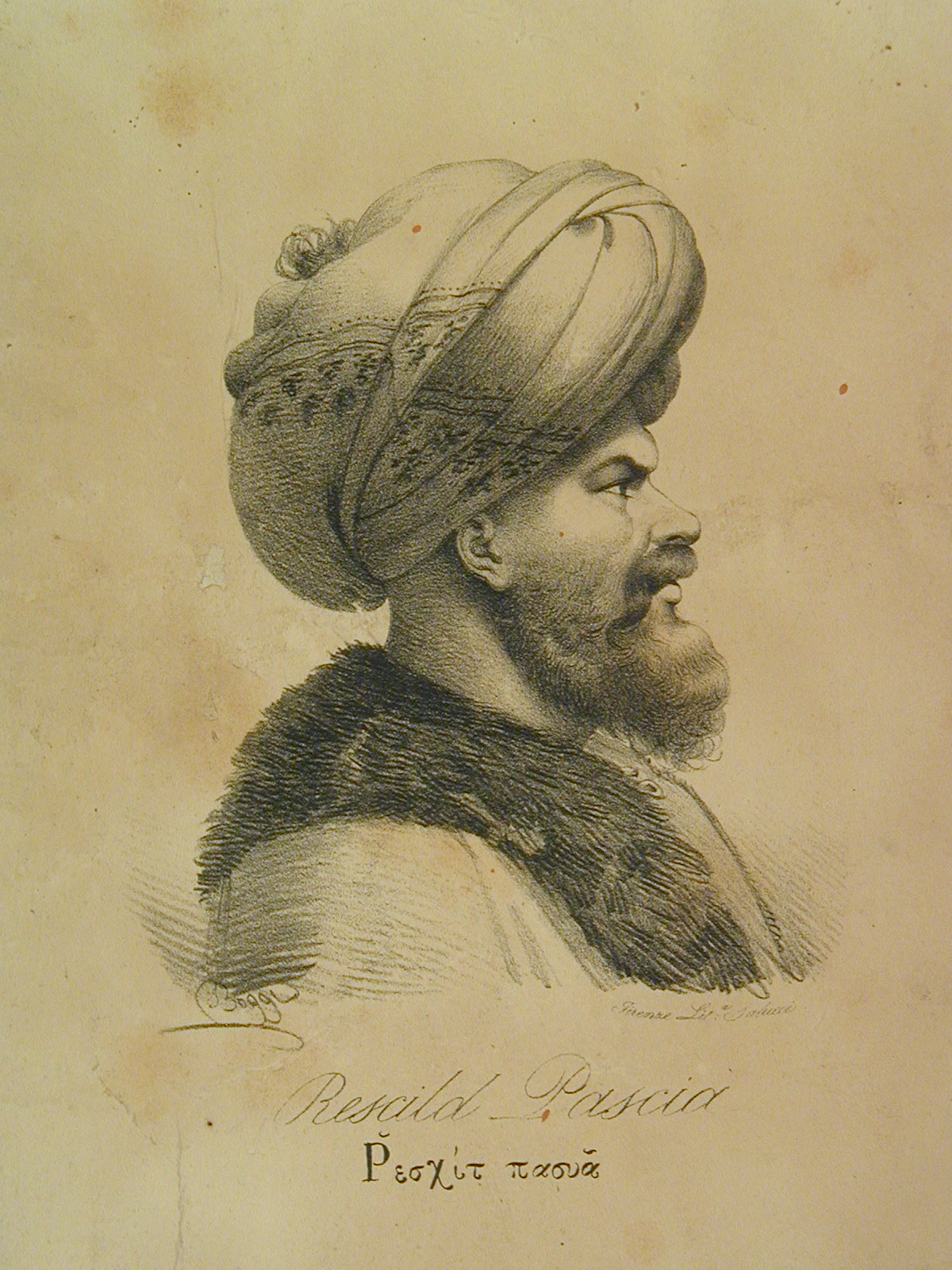

Grand Vizier
- In office January 1829 – 17 February 1833
- Preceded by: Topal Izzet Mehmed Pasha
- Succeeded by: Mehmed Emin Rauf Pasha

Personal details
- Born: 1780
- Died: 1836 (aged 55–56)

Reşid Mehmed Pasha, also known as Kütahı (Greek: Μεχμέτ Ρεσίτ πασάς Κιουταχής, 1780–1836), was an Ottoman statesman and general who reached the post of Grand Vizier in the first half of the 19th century, playing an important role in the Greek War of Independence.

== Early life ==
Reşid Mehmed was born in Circassia, and was of Georgian origin. As a child, he was captured as a slave by the Ottomans, and brought to the service of the then Kapudan Pasha Koca Hüsrev Mehmed Pasha. His intelligence and ability impressed his master and secured his rapid rise. He was stationed in Karađorđe's Serbia for a short time. At only 29 years, he was appointed governor of Kütahya, from where he acquired his sobriquet.

In 1820, he was sent by Sultan Mahmud II, along with many other pashas, to quell the rebellion of Ali Pasha of Yannina against the Porte. At the same time, the Greeks were preparing their own uprising, which broke out in March 1821. Thus, after the defeat and death of Ali Pasha in 1822, he was at hand to campaign against the Greek rebels.

== Operations in Epirus – first siege of Missolonghi ==
Having been appointed commander-in-chief of the Ottoman forces in Epirus, he marched south, to meet the Greek forces under Alexandros Mavrokordatos, which were campaigning towards Arta. He inflicted a crushing defeat upon them in the Battle of Peta, on 4 July 1822, and proceeded southwards, to the strategically important town of Missolonghi. There he was met by Omer Vrioni, and their joint force of 8,000 besieged the city for two months, from 25 October to 31 December 1822. Omer Vrioni, contrary to Reşid Mehmed's view, initially tried to take the town by negotiations, which the besieged Greeks took advantage of, dragging them out until 8 November, when they were reinforced by sea, at which point they refused to negotiate further. The siege began in earnest, and the two pashas scheduled their main assault for Christmas night, 24 December, calculating that the Greeks would be caught by surprise. The plan was leaked to the defenders, and the attack failed. Six days later, the siege was lifted.

== Campaign in Thessaly ==
After the failure at Missolonghi, Reşid Mehmed moved against the mountainous region of Pelion, which he managed to subdue. For his success, he was appointed governor of the sanjak of Trikala, and was finally appointed commander-in-chief of all Ottoman forces in Rumelia.

== Third siege of Missolonghi ==
From this position he was tasked by the Porte with taking Missolonghi and thus securing western Greece. Reşid Mehmed assembled an army of more than 35,000 and in February 1825 he set out for Missolonghi. On arriving there on 20 April, he immediately invested the town with earthworks and subjected it to heavy bombardment. However, despite his efforts, the Greek garrison, aided by raids from the Greek bands behind his lines and resupplied by the Greek fleet despite the Ottoman naval blockade, resisted effectively. In the end, he was forced to call upon the assistance of Ibrahim Pasha of Egypt, whose army had been victorious against Greek forces in the Morea. The Egyptian forces arrived in early November, but a split occurred between the presumptuous Ibrahim and Reşid Mehmed, who withdrew his forces. After the Egyptians failed too in their assaults, Ibrahim acknowledged his error. The two pashas now cooperated, and the siege was intensified. The seaward supply route was cut, forcing threatening the defenders with starvation. Finally, they attempted a desperate escape, breaking out through the besieging forces, on the night of 10 April 1826. The sortie resulted in a massacre of the defenders, and Missolonghi fell to the Ottoman forces.

== Campaign in Attica ==
After this success, Reşid Mehmed turned towards Attica and Athens, where he arrived in July. He besieged the Greek garrison on the Acropolis of Athens unsuccessfully for ten months, until his unexpected victory over a Greek relief force at the Battle of Phaleron on 24 April 1827 forced the Greeks to surrender the fort.

== Campaign against Bosnia Eyalet ==
The Ottoman Bosnian leadership led by Husein Gradaščević were outraged when Sultan Mahmud II granted Serbia autonomy and subsequently six districts from the Bosnia Eyalet with the Treaty of Adrianople. Husein Gradaščević had already begun to support the cause of the fallen Janissary after the Auspicious Incident and would not allow Mahmud II to further disintegrate Bosnian society. Instead of negotiating with Husein Gradaščević, the Grand Vizier Reşid Mehmed Pasha (already engaged in an aggressive campaign against Albanian pashas and beys) mobilized his Ottoman army towards Travnik. Disappointed by Reşid Pasha's move, Gradaščević marched forward with an army of 52,000 into Pristina, and later fought and defeated Reşid Pasha at Shtime. A Bosnian delegation reached the Grand Vizier's camp in Skopje in November of that year. The Grand Vizier promised this delegation that he would insist to the Sultan that he accept the Bosniak demands. His true intentions, however, were manifested by early December when his cannons attacked Bosnian units stationed on the outskirts of Novi Pazar. Reşid Mehmed Pasha later began an aggressive campaign into Bosnia with the assistance of the renegade kapetan Ali-paša Rizvanbegović and defeated the entire army of Bosnia Eyalet led by Husein Gradaščević outside the town of Stup.

== After the Greek revolution ==
A very distinguished general, Reşid Mehmed fought in the Russo-Turkish War, where he was defeated by General Diebitsch at the Battle of Kulevicha. Subsequently, he was appointed Grand Vizier of the Ottoman Empire, a post he held from January 1829 to 17 February 1833. From that position, he orchestrated the Monastir massacre of 1830 of the Albanian beys killing hundreds. He led the Ottoman armies in Anatolia in the Egyptian-Ottoman War. He was captured by the forces of his old antagonist, Ibrahim Pasha, at the war's decisive Battle of Konya in 1832.

== Campaign in the Diyarbakir Eyalet ==
He was appointed the Wāli of Diyarbakir Eyalet and Raqqa Eyalet in 1834 and onwards led military campaigns against the local Kurdish tribes Barzan, Bedir Khan and Milli and the Yazidi in Sinjar. In 1835 he subdued the Kurdish Milli tribe in Mardin. In 1836, he defeated the Soran Emirate after the capture of Mir Kor. He died in 1836.

== Notes and sources ==
Preceded by Topal Izzet Mehmed Pasha	Grand Vizier; January 1829 - 17 February 1833	Succeeded by Mehmed Emin Rauf Pasha
