= Mehmet Yılmaz (footballer, born 1988) =

Turkish footballer

Personal information
- Full name: Mehmet Yılmaz
- Date of birth: March 26, 1988 (age 38)
- Place of birth: Bursa, Turkey
- Height: 1.87 m (6 ft 1 1/2 in)
- Position: Central defender

Team information
- Current team: Kızılcahamamspor

Youth career
- 2002–2006: Bursaspor
- 2006: Bursa Merinosspor

Senior career*
Years	Team	Apps	(Gls)
2006–2008	Bursaspor	0	(0)
2007–2009	Turgutluspor	25	(0)
2009–2010	Siirtspor		
2010–2011	Istanbul BB	3	(0)
2011	→ Turgutluspor (loan)	8	(0)
2012–	Kızılcahamamspor		

International career^{‡}
2002	Turkey U-15	2	(0)
2003–2004	Turkey U-16	12	(0)
2004–2005	Turkey U-17	17	(0)
2005–2006	Turkey U-18	5	(0)
- * Club domestic league appearances and goals as of 14:03, 3 April 2011 (UTC) ‡ National team caps and goals as of 14:03, 3 April 2009 (UTC)

Mehmet Yılmaz (born 26 March 1988 in Bursa) is a Turkish footballer who plays as central defender for Kızılcahamamspor.

== Club career ==
Yılmaz previously played for Bursaspor in the Süper Lig and now playing in İstanbul Büyükşehir Belediyespor (football team) in the Süper Lig. He has represented Turkey at various youth levels. He was one of the significant players of Turkey national U-17 football team which won the European Championship Title and became the third in World Cup in the same year. He is one of the most talented defenders of his generation.
