= Mehmet Kutay Şenyıl =

Turkish footballer

Personal information
- Full name: Mehmet Kutay Şenyıl
- Date of birth: March 6, 1987 (age 39)
- Place of birth: Kocaeli, Turkey
- Height: 1.88 m (6 ft 2 in)
- Position: Defender

Team information
- Current team: Çayırovaspor

Youth career
- 2000–2006: Fenerbahçe

Senior career*
Years	Team	Apps	(Gls)
2006–2009	Fenerbahçe A2	?	(?)
2007–2008	→ Maltepespor (loan)	1	(0)
2009–2010	Düzcespor	25	(0)
2011–2012	Gölcükspor	?	(?)
2012–2014	Gebzespor	40	(1)
2014–	Çayırovaspor	26	(1)
- * Club domestic league appearances and goals as of 17 September 2015

Mehmet Kutay Şenyıl (born 6 March 1987) is a Turkish professional footballer who is currently plays for Çayırovaspor as a defender.
