= Mehmed Ali Pasha =

Mehmed Ali Pasha may refer to:

- Muhammad Ali of Egypt (1769–1849), considered the founder of modern Egypt
- Çerkes Mehmed Pasha (died 1625), Ottoman statesman and grand vizier
- Mehmed Emin Âli Pasha (1815–1871), Ottoman statesman and grand vizier
- Mehmed Ali Pasha (marshal) (1827–1878), Prussian-born Ottoman soldier

== See also ==
- Mehmed Ali, a Turkish given name
- Mehmed, a form of the Arabic name Muhammad
- Ali (name)
- Pasha, a higher rank in the Ottoman political and military system
