= Mehmet Özyürek =

Turkish Guinness World Record holder (1949–2023)

- Born: 17 October 1949; Yusufeli, Artvin Province, Turkey
- Died: 18 May 2023 (aged 73); Rize, Turkey
- Known for: Longest nose in the world
- Height: 178 cm (5 ft 10 in)

Mehmet Özyürek (17 October 1949 – 18 May 2023) was a Turkish Guinness World Record holder. He had been confirmed as having had the world's longest recorded nose. His nose measured 8.80 cm (3.46 inches) when it was last measured on 18 March 2010. It was remeasured in both 2020 and 2021, disproving the myth that a person’s nose and ears continue to grow with age. He had been living in Artvin, Turkey. Özyürek was bullied by his friends for his nose when younger, but later in life, he came to the belief that it was a blessing from God. He also claimed to have a better sense of smell than the average person and was able to inflate a balloon with his nose.

Özyürek died from a heart attack on 18 May 2023, at the age of 73.
