= Koca Hüsrev Mehmed Pasha =

Grand Vizier of the Ottoman Empire from 1839 to 1840

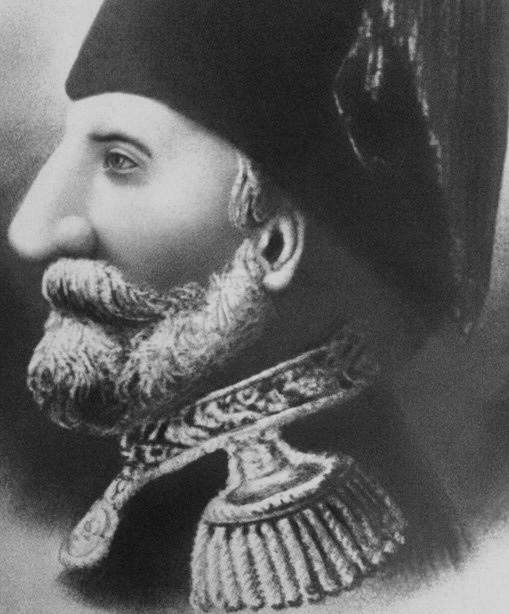
Hüsrev Pasha

Koca Hüsrev Mehmed Pasha (also known as Koca Hüsrev Pasha; sometimes known in Western sources as just Husrev Pasha or Khosrew Pasha; 1756–1855) was an Ottoman admiral, reformer and statesman, who was Kapudan Pasha ("Grand Admiral") of the Ottoman Navy. He reached the position of Grand Vizier rather late in his career, between 2 July 1839 and 8 June 1840 during the reign of Abdulmejid I. However, during the 1820s, he occupied key administrative roles in the fight against regional warlords, the reformation of the army, and the reformation of Turkish attire. He was one of the main statesmen who predicted a war with the Russian Empire, which would eventually be the case with the outbreak of the Crimean War.

== In Egypt ==
He was probably born around 1756, and it is reported that he was of Abaza descent. He was a protégé of Küçük Hüseyin Pasha, a reformer who became Kapudan Pasha in 1792. In 1801, Hüsrev Pasha commanded the 6,000 Ottoman troops who assisted the British in removing the French from Rashid (Rosetta). For this, he was made governor of Egypt Eyalet (province), in which position he was charged with assisting Hüseyin Pasha in the killing or imprisoning of the surviving leaders of the Mamluks. Many of these were freed by or fled with the British, while others held Minya between Upper and Lower Egypt.

Amid these disturbances, Hüsrev Pasha attempted to disband his Albanian bashi-bazouks without pay. This led to rioting that drove him from Cairo to Damietta, where he was ultimately captured by a combined Mamluk-Albanian army (see Muhammad Ali's seizure of power). He was later made governor again by Muhammad Ali for 2 days, although he held no real power; he was released later.

== Provincial governor and Kapudan Pasha ==
Before leaving Egypt, he was appointed as governor of the Diyarbekir Eyalet. A year later, he was appointed governor of Salonica. In 1806 he was governor of Bosnia Eyalet (as which he features in Ivo Andrić's novel Travnička hronika), before being reappointed as governor of Salonica in 1808.

Hüsrev Pasha held the rank of Kapudan Pasha of the Ottoman Navy from 1811 to 1818. He was then appointed governor of the Eyalet of Trabzon twice, during which time he conducted for the Black Sea region of Turkey the struggle the central Ottoman state was waging against local feudal rulers (Derebeys).

On 19 January 1815, Hüsrev Pasha summoned Dr. Lorenzo Noccrola, the long-serving chief physician to the Seraglio, to attend him at the Arsenal, explaining that his own physician was absent. The next morning, Noccrola's body was found lying on a road close to the Arsenal. On examination, he was found to have been strangled.

== Greek War of Independence ==
During the Greek War of Independence, he was appointed Kapudan Pasha again at the end of 1822. In this role, he captured and destroyed the island of Psara in June 1824 and then moved against Samos, where he was joined by the Egyptian fleet. During the months of July and August, several skirmishes and constant maneuvers followed between the Ottoman and Greek fleets, culminating in the Battle of Gerontas, a Greek victory.

== Moderniser of the army ==
In 1826, Hüsrev Pasha played vital roles both in the Auspicious Incident (the annihilation of the Janissary Corps in 1826) and in the formation of the new "Mansure Army", modeled after those of the European Powers. Appointed as serasker (commander of the army) of the Mansure in May 1827, Hüsrev reformed and disciplined the corps. Himself ignorant of modern military methods, he assembled a staff of foreign experts and other personnel to assist him, the "Seraskeriye", which constituted the first staff in Ottoman history. Due to his early championing of military reform and virtual control over the new Ottoman army, Hüsrev was able to install many of his protégés in senior military positions. In total, Hüsrev's household produced more than 30 generals.

== Adoption of children raised to become high-ranking officers ==
Hüsrev Pasha adopted at early ages up to one hundred children, sometimes including slaves bought at market, who, after an attentive education, later became his protégés and rose to important positions in the state structure, the most notable of these being Ibrahim Edhem Pasha, a child from Chios bought in an İzmir slave market in 1822 after the Chios massacre. Levy mentions that in the 27,000-strong initial Mansure Army of 1827, the direct ancestor to today's Turkish Army, the officer corps included a core group of 70–80 of Hüsrev Pasha's "children".

== Adoption of the fez to replace the turban ==
Hüsrev Pasha was also instrumental for the near-abandonment of the turban and the adoption of the fez as a universal headgear for Muslim men of the Ottoman Empire (excluding the religious classes) under Sultan Mahmud II. He had seen the fez as worn occasionally by Tunisians and Algerians during a Mediterranean journey and introduced it to the Ottoman capital, from which the custom spread to all Ottoman lands including the nominal dependency of Egypt. Dress and headgear often signified symbol-laden and politically charged statements in Turkish lands.

Political offices
Preceded by Ebu Merak Mehmed Pasha	Ottoman Governor of Egypt; 22 January 1802 – 6 May 1803	Succeeded by Tahir Pasha
Preceded by Trabluslu Ali Pasha	Ottoman Governor of Egypt; 12 March 1804 – 14 March 1804	Succeeded by Hurshid Ahmed Pasha
Preceded by Mehmed Emin Rauf Pasha	Grand Vizier of the Ottoman Empire; July 1839 – 29 May 1841	Succeeded by Mehmed Emin Rauf Pasha
