= Mehmed Selim Pasha =

Grand Vizier of the Ottoman Empire from 1824 to 1828

Mehmed Selim Pasha (1771 Bender, Moldova – 1831 Damascus, Ottoman Empire, nickname: "Benderli") was an Ottoman statesman. He was Grand Vizier of the Ottoman Empire. He ruled from 14 September 1824 to 24 October 1828 as Grand Vizier of sultan Mahmud II and failed in the fight against the Greek War of Independence. The Auspicious Incident (Vaka-i Hayriye), the Battle of Navarino (1827), happened during his period in office. In 1828–30 he became Wali (governor) of Rumelia and 1830–31 Wali of Damascus (Syria). When the citizens of Damascus and the local garrison of Janissaries rose in revolt against him, Selim Pasha sought refuge into the Citadel of Damascus. After a siege lasting 40 days he was promised safe passage but murdered before he could leave the city.

== Sources ==
Preceded by Mehmed Said Galip Pasha	Grand Vizier; 14 September 1824 - 24 October 1828	Succeeded by Topal Izzet Mehmed Pasha
