= Mahmud =

Mahmud محمود
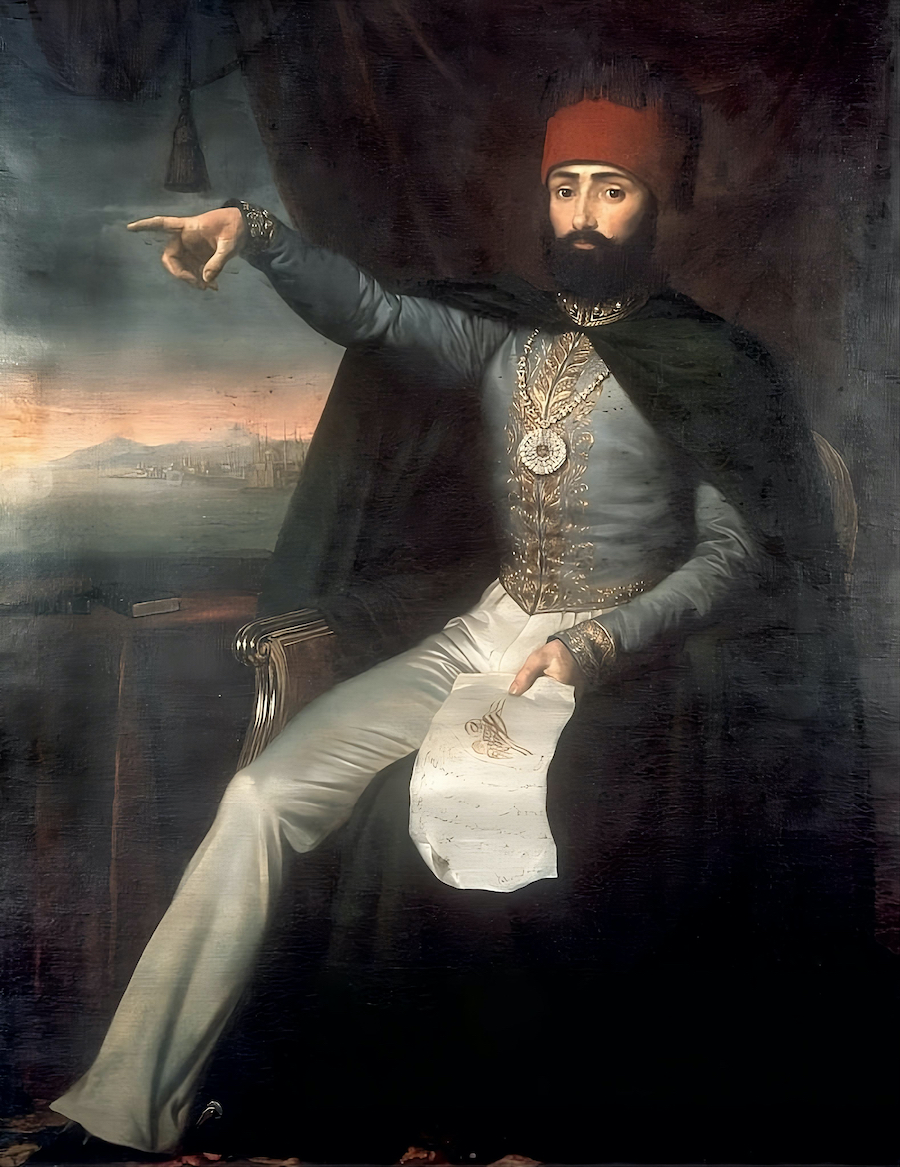
- A painted depiction of Sultan Mahmud II
- Pronunciation: Arabic: [maħˈmuːd] Urdu: [mɛɦˈmuːd̪]
- Gender: Male

Origin
- Language: Arabic
- Meaning: Praiseworthy

Other names
- Cognate: Muhammad
- Anglicisations: Mahmood, Mahmad, Mahmoud, Mahmut, Makhmud, Mehmood, Mehmed, Mehmud, Mahmoed, Malamud, Mahmmoud
- Derived: H-M-D root

Mahmud is a transliteration of the male Arabic given name محمود (Maḥmūd), common in most parts of the Islamic world. It comes from the Arabic triconsonantal root Ḥ-M-D, meaning 'praise', along with Muhammad.

== Given name ==
=== Mahmood ===
- Mahmood Ali (1928–2008), Pakistani radio, television and stage artist
- Mahmood Hussain (cricketer) (1932–1991), Pakistani Test cricketer
- Shah Mahmood Qureshi (born 1956), Pakistani politician, Minister of Foreign Affairs from 2018 to 2022
- Mahmood Shaam (born 1940), Pakistani Urdu-language journalist, poet writer and analyst
- Mahmood Yakubu (born 1962), Nigerian academic and current chairman of Independent National Electoral Commission
- Mahmood Monshipouri (born 1952), Iranian-born American scholar, educator, and author
- Mahmooda Sultana, Bangladeshi American aerospace engineer (NASA)
- Begum Mahmooda Salim Khan (1913–2007), Pakistani social worker
- Mahmood Hussein Mattan (1923–1952), Somali merchant seaman
- Zafar Mahmood Abbasi, four-star admiral of the Pakistan Navy
- Muhammad Mahmood Alam (1935–2013), Pakistani fighter pilot
- Mahmood Anjir Faghnawi (1231–1317), the 13th sheikh in the chain of the masters of the Naqshbandi Order
- Mahmood Mamdani (born 1946), Indian-born Ugandan academic, author, and political commentator

=== Mahmoud ===
- Mahmoud Abbas (born 1935), President of the State of Palestine
- Mahmoud al-Abrash (born 1944), Syrian politician
- Mahmoud Afshartous (1907–1953), Iranian military officer
- Mahmoud Ahmadinejad (born 1956), Iranian politician, President of Iran (2005–2013)
- Mahmoud Ahmed (born 1941), Ethiopian musician
- Mahmoud Alavi (born 1954), Iranian Shia Cleric
- Mahmoud Alavi (military officer), Iranian military officer
- Mahmoud El-Araby (1932–2021), Egyptian businessman and philanthropist
- Mahmoud Baharmast (1899–1977), Iranian army general
- Mahmoud Balbaa (born 1952), Egyptian businessman and politician
- Mahmoud Chahoud (born 1976), Lebanese footballer
- Mahmoud Charr (born 1984), German professional boxer
- Mahmoud Darwish (1941–2008), Palestinian poet
- Mahmoud Dahoud (born 1996), German professional footballer
- Mahmoud Dowlatabadi (born 1940), Iranian writer and actor
- Mahmoud Etemadzadeh (1915–2006), Iranian writer and literary translator
- Mahmoud Fakhry Pasha (1884–1955), Egyptian politician and diplomat
- Mahmoud Farshchian (1930–2025), Iranian painter and miniaturist
- Mahmoud Farshidi (1951–2025), Iranian politician
- Mahmoud Fayad (1925–2002), Egyptian Olympic weightlifter
- Mahmoud Fustuq (1936–2006), Lebanese businessman
- Mahmoud Guinia (1951–2015), Moroccan singer
- Mahmoud Hamshari (1938–1973), assassinated Palestinian official
- Mahmoud Hashemi Shahroudi (1948–2018), Iranian Shia Cleric
- Mahmoud Hessabi (1903–1992), Iranian nuclear physicist and politician
- Mahmoud Hussein (born 1966), Egyptian journalist
- Mahmoud Hweimel (died 2013), Jordanian politician
- Mahmoud Ismail (1914–1983), Egyptian actor, filmmaker
- Mahmoud Jaballah, Egyptian-Canadian Jihad member
- Mahmoud Kahil (1936–2003), Lebanese-born British editorial cartoonist
- Mahmoud Khalil (born 1995), Syrian-born Palestinian Columbia University student detained by US Immigration and Customs Enforcement in 2025: see Detention of Mahmoud Khalil
- Mahmoud El Khatib (born 1954), Egyptian footballer and President of Al Ahly
- Mahmoud Khayami (1930–2020), Iranian industrialist and philanthropist of French nationality
- Mahmoud Labadi (1940–2014), Palestinian journalist, writer and politician
- Mahmoud Mar'ashi Najafi (born 1941), Iranian Shia cleric
- Mahmoud Mekki (born 1954), Vice President of Egypt from August 2012 to December 2012
- Mahmoud el-Meliguy (1910–1983), Egyptian actor
- Mahmoud Mohammad Issa Mohammad (1943–2015), Palestinian terrorist
- Mahmoud Mohieldin (born 1965), economist
- Mahmoud Nabavian (born 1965), Iranian Shia cleric
- Mahmoud Namjoo (1918–1989), Iranian weightlifter
- Mahmoud Abdel Salam Omar (born 1936/37), Egyptian businessman
- Mahmoud Reza Pahlavi (1926–2001), member of Iran's Pahlavi dynasty
- Mahmoud an-Nukrashi Pasha (1888–1949), Prime Minister of Egypt 1945–1946 and 1946–1948
- Mahmoud Bodo Rasch (born 1943), German architect who specializes in the construction of large convertible umbrellas and lightweight structures
- Mahmoud Abdul-Rauf (born 1969), American basketball player
- Mahmoud Abdul Razak (born 1971), Syrian footballer
- Mahmoud Saeed (1939–2025), Iraqi-born American novelist
- Mahmoud Salavati (born 1953), Iranian Shia cleric
- Mahmoud Salem (1931–2013), Egyptian journalist and author
- Mahmoud Sami el-Baroudi (1839–1904), Egyptian politician and poet
- Mahmoud el-Sisi (born 1982), Egyptian brigadier general and son of President Abdel-Fattah el-Sisi
- Mahmoud Taleghani (1911–1979), Iranian Shia cleric
- Mahmoud Zakzouk (1933–2020), Egyptian academic
- Mahmoud Abu Zeid, also known as "Shawkan" (born 1987), Egyptian photojournalist

=== Mahmud ===
- Mahmud I (1696–1754), Sultan of Ottoman Empire 1730–1754
- Mahmud II (1785–1839), Sultan of Ottoman Empire 1808–1839
- Ghazan (1271–1304), born Mahmud Ghazan, (Khan, Ilkhan, Sultan) the seventh ruler of the Mongol Empire's Ilkhanate division in modern-day Iran from 1295 to 1304
- Sultan Mahmud (Chagatai) (died 1402), last Khan of the Western Chagatai Khanate (1384–1402).
- Mahmud Khan (Moghul Khan) (1464–1508), Khan of Tashkent and of the Moghuls of western Moghulistan
- Mäxmüd of Kazan (died 1466), the Khan of the Khanate of Kazan from 1445 to 1466
- Arpa Ke'un (died 1336), known as Mu'izz ad-Din Mahmud, an Ilkhan (1335–1336) during the disintegration of the Ilkhanate, Mongol state in Southwest Asia based in Persia
- Jani Beg (died 1357), or Jalal ad-Din Mahmud, Khan of the Golden Horde from 1342 to 1357
- Mahmud bin Küchük (died 1466), Khan who founded the Khanate of Astrakhan in the 1460s
- Maghan III, known as Mahmud I, mansa of the Mali Empire from 1390 to about 1400.
- Mahmud II (mansa), mansa of the Mali Empire of 1481–1496
- Qutuz (1221–1260), or Mahmud ibn Mamdud, military leader and the third or fourth Mamluk Sultan of Turkic origin
- Mahmud I (Seljuk sultan) (1088–1094), Sultan of the Seljuk Empire from 1092 to 1094.
- Mahmud II of Great Seljuk (1104–1131), Sultan of Baghdad in 1118
- Mahmud of Ghazni (971–1030), ruler of Ghazni 997–1030
- Mahmud Begada (1458–1511), the most prominent Sultan of the Gujarat Sultanate.
- Mahmud Shah III of Gujarat (1526–1554), 12th Sultan of Gujarat
- Mahmud Hotak (1697–1725), the Shah of Persia from 1722 to 1725
- Mahmud Shah Durrani (1769–1829), ruler of Afghanistan 1801–1803 & 1809–1818
- Shahanshah ibn Mahmud, the Kurdish Shaddadid emir of Ani from 1164 to 1174
- Nūr al-Dīn Maḥmūd Zengī, known as Nur ad-Din (died 1174) (1118–1174), Emir of Aleppo and Damascus
- Al-Muzaffar II Mahmud (died 1244), the Ayyubid emir of Hama first in 1219 (616 AH) and then restored in 1229–1244 (626 AH–642 AH)
- Al-Muzaffar III Mahmud (died 1300), the Kurdish Ayyubid emir of Hama from 1284 to 1300
- Mu'izz al-Din Mahmud (died 1241), the Zengid Emir of the Jazira 1208–1241
- Mahmood Shah Bahmani II (1470–1518), or Shihab-Ud-Din Mahmud, the sultan of the Bahmani Sultanate 1482–1518
- Nasiruddin Mahmud Shah (1229/30–1266), Sultan of Delhi, the eighth sultan of the Mamluk Dynasty 1246–1266
- Rashid al-Dawla Mahmud (died 1075), the Mirdasid emir of Aleppo
- Nasr ibn Mahmud (died 1076), the Mirdasid emir of Aleppo in 1075–1076
- Sabiq ibn Mahmud, the Mirdasid emir of Aleppo from 1076 to 1080
- Nasir ad-Din Mahmud (1216–1234), Emir of Mosul from 1219 to 1234
- Alp Arslan ibn Mahmud (died 1146), ruler of Mosul 1127–1146
- Nasir-ud-Din Mahmud Shah Tughluq (died 1413), the last sultan of the Tughlaq dynasty
- Nāṣir al-Dīn Maḥmūd (died 1222), ruler of the Hasankeyf of the Artuqid dynasty
- Ghiyath al-Din Mahmud (died 1212), Sultan of the Ghurid Empire 1206–1212
- Mahmud Shah of Bengal (died 1459), the First Sultan of Bengal
- Ghiyasuddin Mahmud Shah (died 1538), the last Sultan of the Hussain Shahi dynasty of the Bengal Sultanate, from 1533 to 1538 CE
- Mahmud ibn Muhammad (1757–1824), the seventh leader of the Husainid Dynasty and the ruler of Tunisia from 1814 to 1824
- Muhammad II ibn Mahmud (1128–1159), Sultan of Seljuq Empire from 1153 to 1159
- Mahmud Khalji (1436–1469), the Sultan of Malwa, in what is now the state of Madhya Pradesh, India
- Nasiruddin Mahmud (eldest son of Iltutmish) (died 1229), the eldest son of the Delhi Sultan Shamsuddin Iltutmish
- Şehzade Mahmud (son of Mehmed III) (1587–1603), Ottoman prince
- Mahmud Khan of Bengal, 17th-century Bengali nobleman
- Sultan Mahmud Mirza (1453–1495), Timurid Dynasty prince
- Sayyed Mahmud Khan (died 1573), general in the Akbar's army
- Mirza Shah Mahmud (1446–?), Timurid ruler of Herat 1446
- Mahmud Mirza Qajar (1799–?), Iranian prince of the Qajar dynasty
- Mirza Mahmud Shah Bahadur, also known Shah Jahan IV (1749–1790), the eighteenth Mughal emperor for a brief period in 1788
- Mahmud Shah of Jaunpur (1429–1457), the 4th ruler of the Jaunpur Sultanate, reigned from 1440 to 1457
- Jalal al-Din Mahmud (died 1352), the Mihrabanid malik of Sistan from 1350
- Sultan Mahmud ibn Nizam al-Din Yahya (1464–1543), the last Mihrabanid malik of Sistan from 1495 until 1537
- Osman Mohamoud (king), known as Uthman III ibn Mahmud, Somali king who led the Majeerteen Sultanate during the 19th century.
- Mohamoud Ali Shire (died 1960), Somali Sultan of the Warsengali Sultanate
- Mahmud Gawan (1411–1481), prime minister of the Bahmani Sultanate of Deccan
- Mahmud Bey, the fourth and final bey of the Chobanids
- Najm al-Din Mahmud ibn Ilyas al-Shirazi (died 1330), Persian physician from Shiraz
- Mahmud Yalavach, administrator in the Mongol Empire who ruled over Turkestan as governor and eventually went on to be mayor of Taidu (now Beijing)
- Chaophraya Chakri (Mud) (1727–1774), or Mahmud, the Prime Minister of Siam
- Muhammad Shah of Brunei (died 1402), known as Mahmud Shah, first sultan of Brunei, possibly from 1363 to 1402
- Mahmud Shah (Sultan of Malacca) (died 1528), Sultan of Malacca 1488–1528
- Mahmud Badaruddin II (1767–1852), Sultan of Palembang
- Abu al-Mafakhir of Banten (died 1651), born Abu al-Mafakhir Mahmud Abdulkadir, the first king in Java to use the title Sultan
- Mahmud of Terengganu (1930–1998), Sultan Terengganu
- Mahmud Shah I of Pahang (died 1530), the fifth Sultan of Pahang from 1519 to 1530
- Melewar of Negeri Sembilan (died 1795), the first Yamtuan Besar
- Mahmud Pasha Angelović (1420–1474), Grand Vizier of the Ottoman Empire (1456–1466 and 1472–1474). He also wrote Persian and Turkish poems under the pseudonym Adni (the 'Eden-like')
- Çürüksulu Mahmud Pasha (1864–1931), Ottoman army general and statesman of ethnic Georgian background
- Mahmud Pasha (governor) (died 1567), Ottoman statesman from Bosnia
- Mahmud Shams, known as Ma He (1371–1433/35), Chinese admiral and world explorer
- Mahmud Shevket Pasha (1856–1913), Ottoman generalissimo and statesman, who was an important political figure during the Second Constitutional Era
- Mahmud al-Kashgari (1005–1102), lexicographer and Uyghur scholar
- Abu-Mahmud Khujandi (940–1000), Transoxanian astronomer and mathematician
- Mahmud Karimov (1948–2013), Azerbaijani physicist
- Makhmud Muradov (born 1990), professional mixed martial artist
- Makhmud Sabyrkhan (born 2001), Kazakh boxer
- Abdullah Mahmud Hendropriyono (born 1945), Indonesian general
- La Nyalla Mattalitti (born 10 May 1959), full name La Nyalla Mahmud Mattalitti, Indonesian politician
- Karaeng Pattingalloang (1600–1654), or Sultan Mahmud, known as the Father of Makassar
- Mahmud Pasha (1853–1903), Ottoman statesman, poet and writer
- Mahmud Taymur (1894–1973), Egyptian fiction writer
- Yahya ibn Mahmud al-Wasiti, 13th-century Iraqi-Arab painter and calligrapher
- Sultan Mahmud Khan (died 1859), commander of the Sikh Khalsa Army, the army of Sarkar e Khalsa
- Shah Mahmud Khan (1890–1959), Prime Minister of Afghanistan from 1946 to 1953
- Mahmud Jamal (born 1967), Canadian jurist serving as a puisne justice of the Supreme Court of Canada since 2021
- Mahmud Al-Nashaf (1906–1979), Israeli Arab politician
- Mahmud Khalid, Ghanaian politician
- Mahmud Mahmud (1882–1965), Iranian politician
- Mahmud Tarzi (1865–1933), Afghan journalist
- Mahmud Arif (1909–2001), Saudi Arabian poet
- Mahmud Ali Durrani (born 1941), Pakistani two-star rank general officer
- Mahmud Eyvazov (1808–1960), Azerbaijani long-lived collective farmer
- Mahmud Kamani (born 1964), British billionaire businessman
- Aziz Mahmud Hudayi (1541–1628), one of the most famous Sufi Muslim saints of the Ottoman Empire
- Mahmud al-Muntasir (1903–1970), first Prime minister of Libya
- Mahmud Barzanji (1878–1956), King of Kurdistan
- Mahmud Ali (statesman) (1919–2006), progressive leftist Pakistani politician
- Mahmud Ali al-Banna (1926–1985), Egyptian Quran reciter
- Mahmud Nedim Pasha (1818–1883), Grand Vizier of the Ottoman Empire (1871–1872 and 1875–1876)
- Mahmud Bayazidi (1797–1859), Ottoman Kurdish philosopher and polymath from Bayazid
- Mahmud Bayumi (1890–1938), Egyptian orthopaedic surgery professor at Kasr El Aini Medical School
- Makhmud Esambayev (1924–2000), Soviet and Chechen dancer, ballet master, choreographer and actor
- Mahmudkhodja Behbudiy (1875–1919), Jadid activist, writer, journalist and leading public figure in Imperial Russia and Soviet Turkestan
- Mahmud Deobandi (died 1886), Indian Muslim scholar
- Mahmud Hasan Deobandi (1851–1920), Indian Muslim scholar and activist
- Mahmud Hasan Gangohi (1907–1996), Indian mufti and Islamic scholar
- Mufti Mahmud (1919–1980), Pakistani statesman and Islamic scholar
- Md. Mahmud Hassan Talukder (born 1966), Bangladeshi politician
- Mahmud Sheet Khattab (1919–1998), Iraqi polymath and Major General

=== Mahmudi/Mahmudin ===
- Elias Mahmoudi (born 1998), French Muay Thai fighter
- Nur Mahmudi Ismail (born 1961), Mayor of Depok City, Indonesia

=== Mahmut ===
- Mahmut Celal Bayar (1883–1986), third President of Turkey
- Mahmut Dikerdem (1916–1993), Turkish diplomat, writer and peace activist
- Mahmut Cuhruk (1925–2018), Turkish judge
- Mahmut Esat Bozkurt (1892–1943), Turkish politician
- Mahmut Ustaosmanoğlu (1929–2022), Turkish Sufi Sheikh and leader of the İsmailağa jamia of the Naqshbandi-Khalidiyya Ṭarīqah centred in Çarşamba, Istanbul
- Mahmut Orhan (born 1993), Turkish disc jockey and record producer
- Mahmut Bakalli (1936–2006), Kosovo Albanian politician
- Mahmut Atalay (1934–2004), Turkish freestyle wrestler and coach
- Mahmut Özgener (born 1963), Turkish Football Federation president
- Mahmut Bezgin (born 1986), Turkish footballer
- Mahmut Boz (born 1991), Turkish footballer
- Mahmut Hoşgiz (born 1975), Turkish footballer
- Mahmut Tekdemir (born 1988), Turkish footballer
- Mahmut Özdemir (born 1987), German politician of Turkish descent
- Mahmut Yilmaz (born 1979), German footballer of Turkish descent
- Mahmut Bozteke (born 1997), Turkish para taekwondo practitioner
- Mahmut Küçükşahin (born 2004), Turkish footballer
- Mahmut Demir (born 1970), Turkish sport wrestler
- Mahmut Şenol (born 1958), Turkish author
- Mahmut Sönmez (born 1990), Turkish-Dutch footballer
- Mahmut Yavuz (born 1982), Turkish navy officer and ultramarathon runner
- Mahmut Yıldırım (born 1953), Kurdish contract killer

=== Mehmood ===
- Mehmood (actor) (1932–2004), Indian actor, singer, director and producer
- Mehmood Aslam (born 1951), Pakistani television and stage actor
- Mehmood Bhatti (born 1958), Pakistani fashion designer
- Mehmood Quaraishy (born 1942), Kenyan cricketer
- Mehmood Sham (born 1940), Pakistani journalist

=== Mehmud ===
- Maulana Mehmud Hasan (1851–1920), Indian independence activist
- Mehmud Abdukerem (born 1993), Chinese footballer

== Surname ==
=== Mahmood ===
- Khalid Mahmood (British politician) (born 1961), British politician
- Shabana Mahmood (born 1980), British politician
- Jemilah Mahmood (born 1959), doctor and humanitarian activist
- Mazher Mahmood (born 1963), British reporter
- Saba Mahmood (1961–2018), American anthropologist
- Sajid Mahmood (born 1981), English cricketer
- Abdullah al Mahmood (1900–1975), Bengali politician, lawyer and minister in Pakistan
- Iqbal Hassan Mahmood, Bangladeshi politician and minister
- Ayaz Mahmood (born 1964), Pakistani field hockey player
- Kashif Mahmood (cricketer, born 1985) (born 1985), Pakistani cricketer
- Shahid Mahmood (1939–2020), Pakistani cricketer
- Zia Mahmood (born 1946), Pakistani bridge player
- Sultan Bashiruddin Mahmood (born 1940), Pakistani nuclear engineer
- Syed Mahmood (1850–1903), Indian jurist
- Tahir Mahmood (born 1941), Indian jurist
- Talat Mahmood (1924–1998), Indian singer and actor
- Banaz Mahmod (1985–2006), Iraqi Kurdish honour killing victim

=== Mahmoud ===
- Ahmad Mahmoud (1931–2002), Iranian novelist
- Alessandro Mahmoud, known as Mahmood (singer) (born 1992), Italian singer and songwriter
- Aram Mahmoud (born 1997), badminton player
- Emtithal Mahmoud (born 1992/93), Sudanese poet and activist
- Joseph Mahmoud (born 1955), French athlete
- Karem Mahmoud (1922–1995), Egyptian singer
- Mayam Mahmoud, Egyptian rapper and women's rights activist
- Shaaban Mahmoud (born 1981), Egyptian footballer
- Tuana Mahmoud (born 2003), German women's football player of Turkish descent
- Younis Mahmoud (born 1983), Iraqi footballer
- Ahmed Mohamed Mohamoud (1938–2024), President of Somaliland from 2010 to 2017

=== Mehmood ===
- Arshad Mehmood (composer), Pakistani actor and music composer
- Kashif Mehmood (born 1971), Pakistani actor
- Hasnat Mehmood (born 1978), Pakistani artist
- Arshad Mehmood (singer), Pakistani singer
- Faakhir Mehmood (born 1973), Pakistani singer
- Arif Mehmood (born 1983), Pakistani footballer

=== Mehmud ===
- Salim Mehmud, Pakistani rocket scientist

=== Mahmud ===
- Arslanbek Makhmudov (born 1989), Russian professional boxer
- Abid Hamid Mahmud (1957–2012), Iraqi general
- Nureddin Mahmud (1899–1981), Prime Minister of Iraq (1952–1953)
- Amir Machmud (1923–1995), Indonesian military general
- Machmud Singgirei Rumagesan (1885–1964), Papuan King of Sekar and Indonesian independence activist
- Abdul Taib Mahmud (1936–2024), Malaysian politician and Chief Minister of Sarawak (1981–2014)
- Al Mahmud (1936–2019), Bangladeshi poet, novelist, and short-story writer
- Mahmud Mahmud (1882–1965), Iranian academic and politician
- Hayat Mahmud, Bengali feudal lord and military commander
- Abdul Gafoor Mahmud (born 1934), former chief of the Bangladesh Air Force
- Heyat Mahmud (1693–1760), medieval Bengali poet
- Firoz Mahmud (born 1974), Bangladeshi artist
- Khaled Mahmud (born 1971), Bangladeshi cricketer
- A. T. Mahmud (1930–2010), Indonesian songwriter
- Syamsuddin Mahmud (1935–2021), Indonesian economist and politician
- Sultan Mahmud (minister) (1900–1982), politician from Arakan, Burma (now Rakhine State, Myanmar)
- Hasan Mahmud (cricketer) (born 1999), Bangladeshi cricketer
- Dean Mahomed (1759–1851), British Indian traveller, soldier, surgeon, entrepreneur, and one of the most notable early non-European immigrants to the Western World

=== Mahfud ===
- Mahfud MD (born 1957), Indonesian politician and lawyer

=== Mahfouz ===
- Mahfouz Marei Mubarak bin Mahfouz (born 1969), Saudi Arabian businessman
- Naguib Mahfouz (1911–2006), Egyptian writer who won the 1988 Nobel Prize in Literature

== Compound names with the element Mahmud ==
- Mahmudul Amin Choudhury (1937–2019), 11th Chief Justice of Bangladesh
- Mahmudullah
  - Mahmoodullah Shah Hussaini (died 1894), Indian Sufi poet
  - Mahmudullah Riyad (born 1986), Bangladeshi cricketer
- Mahmudul Haque (disambiguation), multiple people
- Mahmudul Hasan (disambiguation), multiple people
- Mahmudul Islam
  - Mahmudul Islam (1936–2016), 10th Attorney General of Bangladesh
  - Mahmudul Islam Chowdhury (born 1950), 1st Mayor of Chittagong
- Mahmudul Karim Chowdhury (1938–2012), Bangladeshi politician
- Mahmudunnabi Chowdhury (1908–1995), Bangladeshi politician, businessman and former minister
- Mahmudur Rahman (disambiguation), multiple people
- Mehmood-ur-Rasheed (born 1954), Pakistani politician
- Sikder Mahmudur Razi, Bangladeshi High Court justice

== Fictional characters ==
- Mahmoud Bishara, fictional character in the book Refugee

== See also ==
- Mahmoud (horse) (foaled 1933), French-bred, British-trained Thoroughbred racehorse and sire
