= State Agency for the Protection of Strategic Objects (Azerbaijan) =

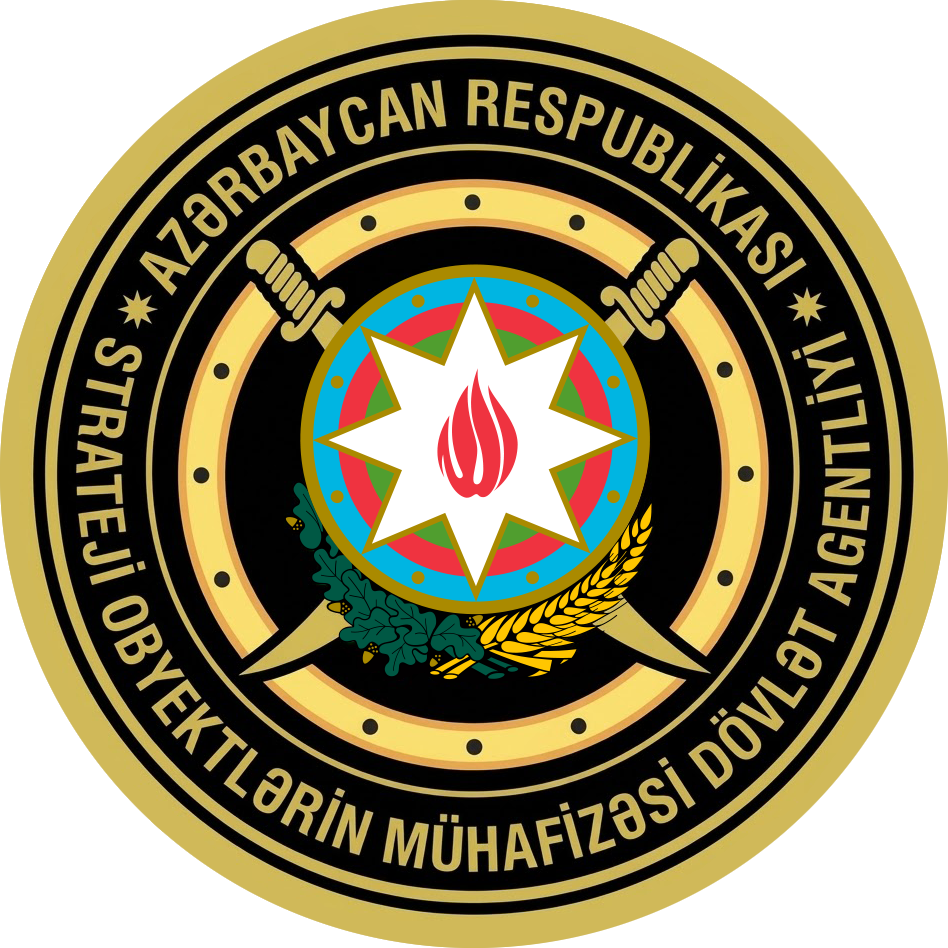

Agency overview
- Formed: March 16, 2020

The State Agency for the Protection of Strategic Facilities of the Republic of Azerbaijan, or SOMDA for short, is a central executive body that exercises powers in the field of ensuring the security and protection of strategic facilities and persons determined by the President of the Republic of Azerbaijan.

The legal basis of the State Agency for the Protection of Strategic Facilities of the Republic of Azerbaijan is the Constitution of the Republic of Azerbaijan, international treaties to which the Republic of Azerbaijan is a party, the Law of the Republic of Azerbaijan "On Military Duty and Military Service" and other laws, decrees and orders of the President of the Republic of Azerbaijan, decisions and orders of the Cabinet of Ministers of the Republic of Azerbaijan, the "Regulation on the State Agency for the Protection of Strategic Facilities of the Republic of Azerbaijan" and normative legal acts of central executive bodies adopted in accordance with the legislation related to its activities.

== History ==
The Law on the Establishment of the Security Unit of the Azerbaijani Parliament was adopted at the 15th session of the Parliament of the Azerbaijan Democratic Republic held on February 18, 1919. According to the law, the "Mejlisi Mabusan Khasse Security Unit" was established, which was under the authority of the parliament.

After the establishment of Soviet power in Azerbaijan, the special security service underwent many changes, but it continued to develop as a necessary institution. Thus, in 1931–1935 it was called the Security Department of the People's Commissariat of Internal Affairs (5th Special Division), in 1936–1972 it was called the 2nd Division of the Internal Affairs Department of the Baku City Executive Committee, and from 1972 to 1991 it was called the Security Department of the Party-Soviet Bodies of the Ministry of Internal Affairs of the Azerbaijan SSR.

With the return of our people's national leader Heydar Aliyev to political power on June 15, 1993, at the request of the people, a new stage began in the field of special state protection in our country. On August 23, 1993, national leader Heydar Aliyev, exercising the powers of the President of the Republic of Azerbaijan, signed a Decree on the establishment of the Main Protection Department of the Supreme State Power and Administrative Bodies of the Republic of Azerbaijan on the basis of the Department of Protection of the Supreme State Power and Administrative Bodies and the Azerbaijani National Guard.

By the Decree of the President of the Republic of Azerbaijan dated May 6, 2002, the Main Security Department of the Supreme State Power and Administrative Bodies of the Republic of Azerbaijan was renamed the Special State Security Service of the Republic of Azerbaijan.

By the decree of the President of the Republic of Azerbaijan dated August 21, 2008, August 23 was declared the professional holiday of employees of the Special State Protection Service.

On March 16, 2020, the President of the Republic of Azerbaijan Ilham Aliyev signed a Decree "On improving management in the field of special state protection." According to the decree, the Special State Protection Service of the Republic of Azerbaijan was abolished and three state bodies were established on its basis - the Security Service of the President of the Republic of Azerbaijan, the State Service for Special Communications and Information Security, and the State Agency for the Protection of Strategic Facilities.

By the decree of the President of the Republic of Azerbaijan dated September 24, 2024, March 16 was declared a professional holiday for employees of the State Agency for the Protection of Strategic Facilities.

== Management ==
- İlqar Abbasov (15 iyul 2022 – 24 oktyabr 2025)
- Sərdar Səfərov (24 oktyabr 2025 – h. h.)

== See also ==
- Prezidentin Təhlükəsizlik Xidməti (Azərbaycan)
- Xüsusi Rabitə və İnformasiya Təhlükəsizliyi Dövlət Xidməti (Azərbaycan)

== Sources ==
- Xüsusi dövlət mühafizəsi sahəsində idarəetmənin təkmilləşdirilməsi haqqında Azərbaycan Respublikası Prezidentinin Fərmanı
