= Death and state funeral of Heydar Aliyev =

Death of former Azerbaijani president

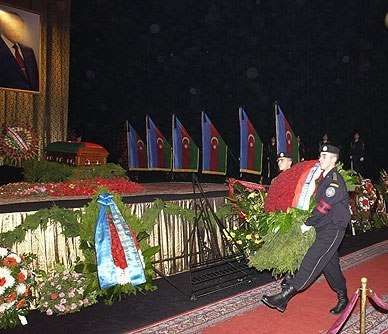
- The coffin with the body of Heydar Aliyev Palace of the Republic
- Date: 15 December 2003; 22 years ago
- Location: Baku, Azerbaijan
- Burial: Alley of Honor

Heydar Aliyev, the third President of Azerbaijan, died on 12 December 2003 in the Cleveland Clinic (United States) at 10 am local time from heart failure at the age of 80. On 14 December, his coffin was taken to Baku.

== Funeral commission ==
On 13 December, Azerbaijani President Ilham Aliyev signed a decree on the establishment of the State Commission for the funeral of his father, Heydar. The following list contains members of the commission:

- Ilham Aliyev - President of the Republic and Chairman of the State Commission
- Murtuz Alasgarov - Speaker of the National Assembly of Azerbaijan
- Artur Rasizade - Prime Minister of Azerbaijan
- Ramiz Mehdiyev - Head of the Presidential Administration
- Farhad Abdullayev - Chairman of the Constitutional Court
- Vilayat Guliyev - Minister of Foreign Affairs
- Safar Abiyev - Minister of Defense
- Namig Abbasov - Minister of National Security
- Ramil Usubov - Minister of Internal Affairs
- Zakir Garalov - Prosecutor General
- Allahshukur Pashazade - Chairman of the Caucasian Muslims Office
- Mahmud Karimov - President of the National Academy of Sciences of Azerbaijan
- Hajibala Abutalibov - Mayor of Baku
- Anar Rzayev - Chairman of the Writers' Union of Azerbaijan

== Ceremony ==
The farewell ceremony was held 15 December 2003 at the Palace of the Republic (nowadays Heydar Aliyev Palace) and was broadcast live on the main Azerbaijani TV channels. The funeral lasted seven hours and was attended by 250,000 people. At 9.00 local time, the farewell ceremony began, with a guard of honor from the National Guard of Azerbaijan being lined up at the coffin. A prayer service was also held at the local mosque. After the official ceremony, a procession of many kilometres took place. After staying in Baku for only an hour and a half, Putin and Nazarbayev left the ceremonies early via Bina International Airport. Heydar Aliyev was buried in the Alley of Honor next to his wife Zarifa Aliyeva. During the funeral, an artillery salute was given.

=== Dignitaries ===
The ceremony was attended by past and present Azerbaijani politicians and a plethora of international dignitaries, which included the following:

- The president of Azerbaijan, Ilham Aliyev
- The first lady of Azerbaijan, Mehriban Aliyeva
- The president of Russia, Vladimir Putin
- (Russia) The mayor of Moscow, Yury Luzhkov
- (Russia) The president of Dagestan, Magomedali Magomedov
- (Commonwealth of Independent States) The secretary general of CIS, Vladimir Rushallo
- The president of Kazakhstan, Nursultan Nazarbayev
- The president of Kyrgyzstan, Askar Akayev
- The president of Moldova, Vladimir Voronin
- The president of Georgia, Nino Burjanadze
- The former president of Georgia, Eduard Shevardnadze
- Candidate in the 2004 Georgian presidential election, Mikheil Saakashvili
- Chairman of the Government of Adjara, Aslan Abashidze
- The president of Ukraine, Leonid Kuchma
- The president of Turkey, Ahmet Necdet Sezer
- The prime minister of Turkey, Recep Tayyip Erdoğan
- The Speaker of the Legislative Chamber of the Oliy Majlis of Uzbekistan, Erkin Khalilov

== Reactions ==
- President of Kazakhstan Nursultan Nazarbayev expressed condolences to Ilham Aliyev, saying "The people of Azerbaijan suffered a heavy loss".
- On 13 December, President of Kyrgyzstan Askar Akayev sent a telegram of condolences to Ilham Aliyev.
- (Russia) Russian president Vladimir Putin expressed his condolences in a phone call with President Ilham Aliyev. The Azerbaijani embassy in Moscow opened its doors for people to sign the book of condolences. Patriarch Alexy II of Moscow referred to Aliyev as "the wisest statesman has passed away, who devoted his whole life to the prosperity of the people of Azerbaijan and made a significant contribution to strengthening the once common state for our peoples." Condolences also came from former Russian Premier Yevgeny Primakov.
- The United States Department of State sent condolences to Ilham Aliyev.

== Gallery ==
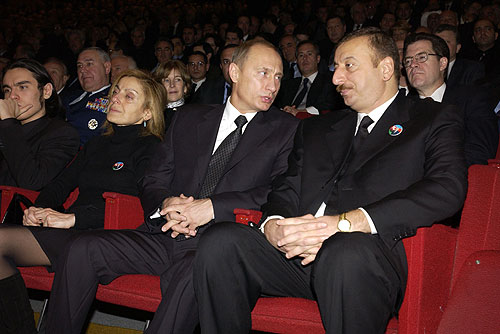
Ilham Aliyev with Vladimir Putin during the funeral.

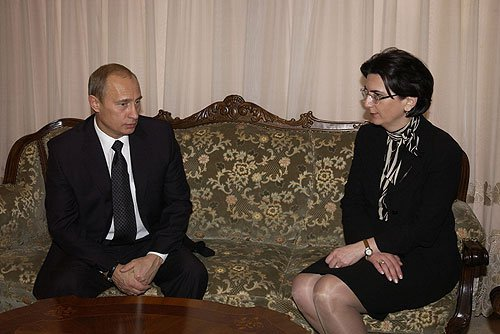
Georgian interim leader Nino Burjanadze with Vladimir Putin on the sidelines of the state funeral.
