= Mahmoud Bayoumi =

Egyptian surgeon

Mahmoud Bayoumi, FRCS (c 1890 - 1938) was an Egyptian orthopaedic surgery professor at Kasr El Aini Medical School. He established the Kasr El Aini Orthopaedic Surgery Department with Professor Mohamed Kamel Hussein. He is the father of the actor Ahmed Ramzy.

During World War I, Bayumi, who was studying in England, worked as a civilian contract surgeon in the Welsh Metropolitan War Hospital in Cardiff. In his memoirs, the American orthopaedic surgeon H. Winnett Orr described Bayumi as a "fine worker". Bayumi and a fellow civilian Portuguese surgeon were assigned as assistants to two British surgeons and each had charge of two wards of about fifty beds each.

Back to Egypt, he was assigned professor of surgery in the Egyptian University. In 1938 he established Kasr El Aini Orthopaedic Surgery Department, the oldest department dedicated for orthopaedic surgery in Egypt and the Middle East, with Professor Mohamed Kamel Hussein.

On April 7, 1938, the council of the Royal College of Surgeons of England elected Bayumi as fellow of the College without examination.

== Family ==
In October 1915, Bayumi married Helen MacKay, a Scottish lady. They had three male children: Hassan, who later became a doctor, Ramzy, who graduated from the Faculty of Commerce and became a film actor, and Omar, who died a child.
