= Şenol =

Şenol is a Turkish masculine given name. Notable people with the name include:

- Şenol Birol (1937-2022), Turkish footballer
- Şenol Can (born 1983), Bulgarian footballer and manager
- Şenol Çorlu, Turkish footballer
- Şenol Fidan (born 1967), Turkish footballer and coach
- Şenol Güneş (born 1952), Turkish footballer and manager
- Şenol Sunat (born 1956), Turkish politician and biologist

== See also ==
- Ahmet Şenol (1926-2019), Turkish wrestler
- Canan Senol (born 1970), Turkish-Kurdish visual artist
- Mahmut Şenol (born 1958), Turkish-Canadian writer
