= Mahmudur Rahman (disambiguation) =

Mahmudur Rahman (محمود الرحمن) is a masculine given name of Arabic origin. Notable bearers of the name include:

- Mahmudur Rahman (born 1953), Bangladeshi author, engineer and businessman
- Mahmudur Rahman Majumdar (1922–2011), Bangladeshi brigadier general
- Mahmudur Rahman Choudhury (1928–1999), Bangladeshi major general, medical scientist and physician
- Mahmudur Rahman Manna (born 1948), Bangladeshi media personality and politician
- Mahmudur Rahman Belayet (1945–2023), Bangladeshi politician
- Mahmudur Rahman Rana (born 1982), Bangladeshi cricketer
- Mehmoodur Rehman (died 2017), Indian civil servant

== See also ==
- Mahmud
- Rahman (name)
