= Edwin Goodall =

Edwin Goodall CBE FRCP (1863 – 29 November 1944) was a British physician and president of the History of Medicine Society of the Royal Society of Medicine from 1935 to 1937.

Edwin Goodall was born in Calcutta, India, in 1863, the son of E. B. Goodall, who was a solicitor. He qualified at Guy's Hospital in London, and undertook postgraduate study at Tübingen in Germany. He worked as a house physician at Guy's Hospital and at Bethlem Royal Hospital, both in London. He became a demonstrator in pathology at Owens College in Manchester (which later became part of the University of Manchester).

He decided to work on the treatment of insanity, and acted as assistant medical officer in the West Riding Asylum in Wakefield, Yorkshire, before being appointed as medical superintendent at the Joint Counties Asylum in Carmarthen, south west Wales (which later became St David's Hospital). In 1906, Goodall was appointed the first superintendent of Cardiff City Mental Hospital, prior to its opening in 1908. The large psychiatric hospital was later renamed as Whitchurch Hospital.

In 1914, Goodall delivered the prestigious annual Croonian Lecture, at the invitation of the Royal Society and the Royal College of Physicians, with a paper entitled Modern Aspects of Certain Problems in the Pathology of Mental Disorders.

During the First World War, Whitchurch Hospital treated military patients. Goodall remained in charge of the hospital and was commissioned as a lieutenant-colonel in the Royal Army Medical Corps.

In 1899 Goodall married Anna Filippa Jönsson of Halmstad, Sweden. He remained at Whitchurch Hospital until his retirement in 1929. In retirement he moved to Hove in Sussex, where he died on 29 November 1944.
