= Ḥ-M-D =

Triconsonantal Semitic root of Arabic and Hebrew words

Ḥ-M-D (Arabic: ح-م-د, Hebrew: ח־מ־ד) is the triconsonantal Semitic root of many Arabic and some Hebrew words. Many of those words are used as names. The basic meaning expressed by the root is "to praise" in Arabic and "to desire" in Hebrew.

== Usage ==
=== Concepts ===
==== Arabic ====
- Hamd — "praise", a song or poem in praise of Allah
- Mahmad — "desire, desirable thing, pleasant thing, beloved, goodly, lovely, pleasant, desirable, precious ones, precious things, precious treasures, treasures, valuable"
- Mahmud — "desirable, precious thing, pleasant thing"

==== Hebrew ====
- Ḥemda חֶמְדָּה — "desire, delight, beauty".
- Nehmad נֶחְמָד — "nice, cute, pleasant, lovely"
- Ḥamud חָמוּד — "cute, lovely, sweet, pretty"
- Maḥmad מַחְמָד — "something desirable", as in hayat maḥmad חַיַּת מַחְמָד "pet" ("desirable animal"), maḥmad eino מַחְמַד עֵינוֹ "someone's beloved" ("desire of his eyes")
- Ḥemed חֶמֶד — "grace, charm"
- Ḥamad חָמַד — "desired, coveted", as in lo taḥmod לֹא תַחְמֹד "Thou shalt not covet"

=== Names ===
- Ahmad — "highly praised"
- Hamid — "[the one] given praise"
- Mahmud — "desirable, precious thing, pleasant thing, praiseworthy"
- Muhammad — "praiseworthy"
- Abdulhamid — "servant of the Most Praised"
- Hamoudi חֲמוּדִי — Hebrew colloquial name, lit. 'cutie'
- Hemed חֶמֶד — a village in Gush Dan, Israel
