= Mahmudul Hasan =

Mahmudul Hasan is a masculine given name of Arabic origin, meaning "trustee of the truth". Notable bearers of the name include:

== Given name ==
- Mahmudul Hasan (general) (1936–2025), Bangladeshi major general and politician
- Mahmood-ul Hassan (1924–1988), Pakistani field hockey player
- Mahmudul Hasan (scholar) (born 1950), Bangladeshi Islamic scholar
- Rana Mahmood-ul-Hassan (born 1970), Pakistani politician
- Chaudhry Mahmood ul Hassan (born 1971), Pakistani politician
- Mahmudul Hasan Sohag (born 1981), Bangladeshi entrepreneur
- Mahmudul Hasan (cricketer, born 1990), Bangladeshi cricketer
- Mahmudul Hasan (cricketer, born 1994), Bangladeshi cricketer
- Mahmudul Hasan Joy (born 2000), Bangladeshi cricketer
- Mahmudul Hasan Kiron (born 2001), Bangladeshi footballer
- Mahmudul Hasan, Bangladeshi politician and MP

== See also ==
- Mahmud
- Hasan
