= Mahmut Hoşgiz =

Turkish footballer

Mahmut Hoşgiz (born 16 September 1975) is a Turkish football manager and former player. He played as a midfielder.

== Career ==
Born in Hafik, Sivas, Hoşgiz played professional football for Sivasspor in the TFF First League, where he was club captain. He also previously played for Petrolofisi, Eyüpspor and Tokatspor.
