= Mahmoud El-Araby =

Egyptian businessman and philanthropist (1932–2021)

- محمود العربي
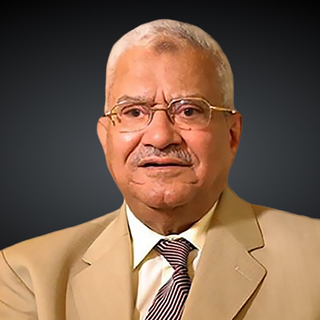
- Born: 1932; Ashmoun, Menoufia, Egypt
- Died: September 9, 2021
- Known for: Founder of ELARABY Group

Mahmoud El-Araby (1932 - September 9, 2021) was an Egyptian businessman and philanthropist. He founded ELARABY Group in 1964, a company that manufactures and trades home appliances and consumer electric products in Egypt and the Middle East.

== Early life ==
Mahmoud El-Araby was born in 1932 in Menoufia, Egypt.

== Career ==
In 1974, El-Araby obtained the selling rights for Toshiba products. In October 1980, Toshiba approved building a factory in Benha to partly manufacture and assemble their products. The Benha complex was completed in 1982. It was followed by the larger Quesna complex that has nine factories and three subsidized manufacturing plants. Later, El-Araby obtained selling and distribution rights from other companies, such as Sharp, Hitachi, Seiko Watch Corp., Sony, and NEC.

== Personal life ==
He had six sons and two daughters.

== Death ==
Mahmoud El-Araby died on September 9, 2021, at the age of 89.
