= Syamsuddin Mahmud =

Indonesian economist and politician (1935–2021)

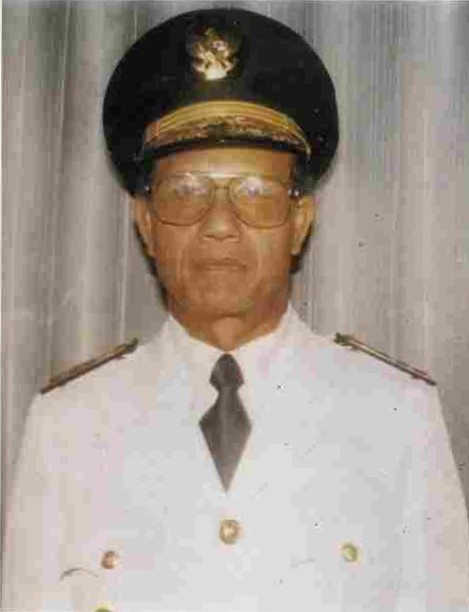

Governor of Aceh
- In office 26 May 1993 – 21 June 2000
- President: Suharto; B. J. Habibie; Abdurrahman Wahid
- Preceded by: Ibrahim Hassan
- Succeeded by: Ramli Ridwan (acting); Abdullah Puteh

Personal details
- Born: 24 April 1935 Pidie, Aceh, Dutch East Indies
- Died: 22 May 2021 (aged 86) Banda Aceh, Aceh, Indonesia
- Party: Golkar
- Spouse(s): Mariana Syamsuddin (died 2008) Haslinda Syamsuddin (m. 2008; died 2018) Khairah Syamsuddin (m. 2018)
- Children: Phaumi Syamsuddin; Susi Syamsuddin; Yanna Syamsuddin; Riva Syamsuddin

Syamsuddin Mahmud (24 April 1935 – 22 May 2021) was an Indonesian economist and politician. He served as the Governor of Aceh from 1993 until 1998 and from 1998 until 2000.

== Early life ==
Syamsuddin Mahmud was born on 24 April 1935 at Lampoh Lada village, a small locality in the regency of Pidie, Aceh. During his childhood, Syamsuddin was known as a persistent reciter of the Quran, reciting a minimum of two pages of the Quran every day. He also visited surau regularly to attend Quran reciting lectures.

Syamsuddin's parents were late to enroll him in elementary school due to the Japanese occupation of Aceh during World War II. As a result, his education lagged behind other schoolchildren of the same age. However, within several years, Syamsuddin managed to catch up and skipped the 5th grade, allowing him to progress along with other students of his age.

After graduating from primary school, Syamsuddin entered junior high school in Sigli. Syamsuddin then migrated to Jakarta after finishing his junior high school education. However, he was told to take a junior high school re-examination before applying for high school. He then finished high school and entered the University of Indonesia. While studying in the university, Syamsuddin formed a Malay orchestra group with Ibrahim Hassan—later Governor of Aceh—as one of its members. He also briefly played for the Persija Jakarta football team. He graduated from the university with an undergraduate degree in economics in 1963.

== Career ==
After graduating from the University of Indonesia, Syamsuddin returned to Aceh and became a lecturer at the Syiah Kuala University. He then moved to Belgium for a decade-long tenure as a lecturer and obtained a doctorate in economics from Ghent University in 1975. He came back to Aceh shortly thereafter and was appointed an assistant to the rector of the Syiah Kuala University.

Syamsuddin became the dean of the economics faculty of the university from 1977 until 1981. He was made a professor in economics six years later.

== Governor of Aceh ==
=== Election ===
==== 1993 gubernatorial election ====
After Governor of Aceh Ibrahim Hassan was appointed a minister in Suharto's cabinet, the office of the governor of Aceh became vacant. There were two candidates for this election: Syamsuddin and Usman Hasan, a member of the People's Representative Council.

The competition between the two was described by political observers as a fight between "moths and elephants". (Note: An Indonesian idiom, comparable to "David and Goliath".) Although Syamsuddin had held a provincial-level office for about a decade, he did not publicly appear very often and was overshadowed by the flamboyant and loud Ibrahim Hassan. Meanwhile, Usman Hasan was the leader of the Golkar party—the ruling party at that time—in the parliament and was described as a "national-level figure" by the Acehnese. Usman was rumored to be supported by the government at that time.

The two candidates were backed by different factions. Syamsuddin was backed by Ibrahim Hassan himself and Minister of Logistics Bustanil Arifin, while Usman was backed by the Central Executive Council of the Golkar party and Minister of Research B. J. Habibie. However, Ibrahim Hassan reportedly later gathered leaders of various groups in the Aceh parliament in the governor's residence and stated that President Suharto had endorsed Syamsuddin for the governor's office. Although Ibrahim Hassan later denied holding such meeting, the Usman faction also claimed that they had been endorsed by Suharto. Eventually, the Golkar and Armed Forces groups, the two largest groups in Aceh's parliament, decided to endorse Syamsuddin.

At the parliamentary gubernatorial election held on 13 May 1993, Syamsuddin won the election with 26 votes. The other candidate, Usman Hasan, obtained 12 votes, while a sham candidate named Malik Ridwan Badai obtained three votes. Syamsuddin was sworn in as governor on 26 May 1993.

==== 1998 gubernatorial election ====
At the end of his first term as governor, Syamsuddin sought re-election and was put forward as a candidate for governor. He managed to win the election held in April 1998 with 25 votes, with his main opponent Abdullah Puteh obtaining 17 votes and sham candidate Asnawi Hasjmy 3 votes. However, after three months, Syamsuddin had still not been sworn in for his second term, sparking allegations that President B. J. Habibie—Suharto's successor—intentionally delayed confirming the election results. Syamsuddin was finally sworn in for his second term on 19 June 1998.

=== Aceh autonomy movement ===
After he assumed his second term as Governor of Aceh, Syamsuddin quietly supported the Aceh autonomy movement. In the midst of escalating involvement by the military against the Free Aceh Movement, Syamsuddin requested the president via the minister of home affairs at his inauguration to stop conducting military operations in Aceh, stating that the operations caused "physical and mental torment" to the Acehnese people.

As demands by Aceh people for autonomy increased, Syamsuddin became increasingly open in his support for autonomy. In February 1999, Syamsuddin proposed to transform Aceh into a federated state, which he said would resolve Aceh's problem. His proposal triggered fierce opposition from the central elites, especially Minister of Justice Muladi, who stated that he would try to block Syamsuddin's proposal, which quickly died due to the lack of support from the central government.

On the night of 11 November 1999, Syamsuddin, alongside several of his subordinates, signed a petition which demanded a referendum for the people of Aceh to be conducted under the supervision of the United Nations and a script which demanded its signatories be committed in the struggle for Aceh's autonomy on national and international levels.

Several months before his resignation as governor in June 2000, Syamsuddin put forward a bill that would transform Aceh into a federated state similar to a U.S. state. He argued that the bill conformed with the People's Consultative Assembly decision that gave Aceh a special autonomy status.

=== Protests and cases ===
In June 1998, fifty-four students sued Syamsuddin, his vice governor Zainuddin AG, and regional secretary assistant Razali Yusuf for misappropriating funds from the Human Resource Development (PSDM, Pengembangan Sumber Daya Manusia) Foundation.

On the day before his inauguration as governor of Aceh for the second term, a group of university students protested in front of Aceh's parliament building and stayed overnight, demanding Syamsuddin resign from the office of governor. According to the group, Syamsuddin lacked the competence to lead Aceh.

=== Resignation ===
Worried that Syamsuddin's stance on autonomy would cause national disintegration, President Abdurrahman Wahid enacted a decree on 7 June 2000 which dismissed him from the office of governor. The decree was enacted in response to a motion of no confidence by the Aceh parliament on 29 April due to Syamsuddin's slow handling of Aceh's problems.

Initially, Syamsuddin was shocked when he received the decree a week later, as he felt that he was not involved in any corruption or criminal case during his seven-year tenure as governor. Syamsuddin later stated that he was "not disappointed with Wahid's decree" and had no plans to sue the president for enacting the decree. After accepting the decree, Syamsuddin handed over his governor's office to the acting governor—previously his second-term vice governor—Ridwan Ramli, on 21 June 2000.

In exchange, Wahid offered him a position as the Deputy Head of the National Development Planning Agency. Syamsuddin refused the offer, citing that he was sixty five years old at the time, while the maximum age to hold the office was sixty years. Syamsuddin stated that he would resume his previous career as a lecturer in the Syiah Kuala University and as an author.

== Death ==
Syamsuddin died at 10:30 on 22 May 2021 at the Zainoel Abidin Hospital due to COVID-19 related complications.

== Personal life ==
Syamsuddin was first married to Mariana, an English lecturer at the Syiah Kuala University. The couple had four children, Phaumi Sjamsuddin, Susi Sjamsuddin, Yanna Sjamsuddin, and Riva Sjamsuddin. Mariana died in 2008 and Syamsuddin was married again to Haslinda in the same year. Haslinda later died on 28 May 2018, leaving Syamsuddin a widower again. Exactly three months later, Syamsuddin married for the third time to Khairah, a widow whose husband also died several months before the marriage.
