= Whitchurch Hospital =

Former hospital in Cardiff, Wales

- Cardiff and Vale University Health Board
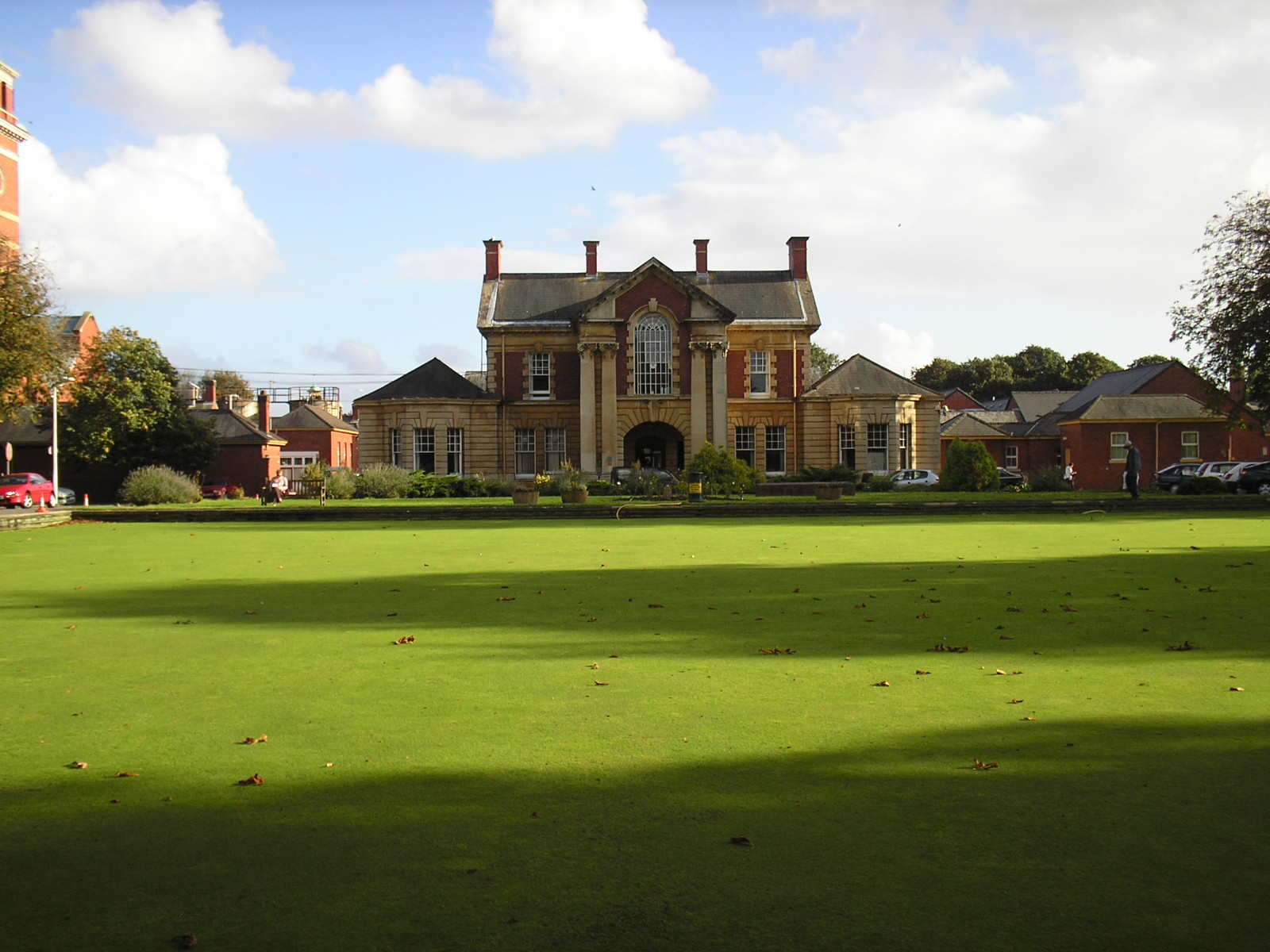
- Main hospital entrance and bowling green

- Shown in Cardiff

Geography
- Location: Cardiff, South Glamorgan, Wales, United Kingdom
- Coordinates: 51.51687°N 3.23184°W

Organisation
- Care system: Public NHS
- Type: Specialist
- Affiliated university: Cardiff University

Services
- Emergency department: No Accident & Emergency
- Speciality: Psychiatric hospital

History
- Founded: 1908
- Closed: 2016

Links
- Lists: Hospitals in Wales

Whitchurch Hospital (Welsh: Ysbyty'r Eglwys Newydd) was a psychiatric hospital in Whitchurch, an area in the north of Cardiff. It was managed by the Cardiff and Vale University Health Board. The hospital remains a grade II listed building. Its grounds are separately listed, also at Grade II, on the Cadw/ICOMOS Register of Parks and Gardens of Special Historic Interest in Wales.

== History ==
The population of Cardiff had expanded greatly, from under 20,000 in 1851 to over 40,000 less than 20 years later. By 1890, there were 476 Cardiff residents "boarded out" in the Glamorgan Asylum, and a further 500 to 600 being held in hospitals as far away as Chester and Carmarthen.

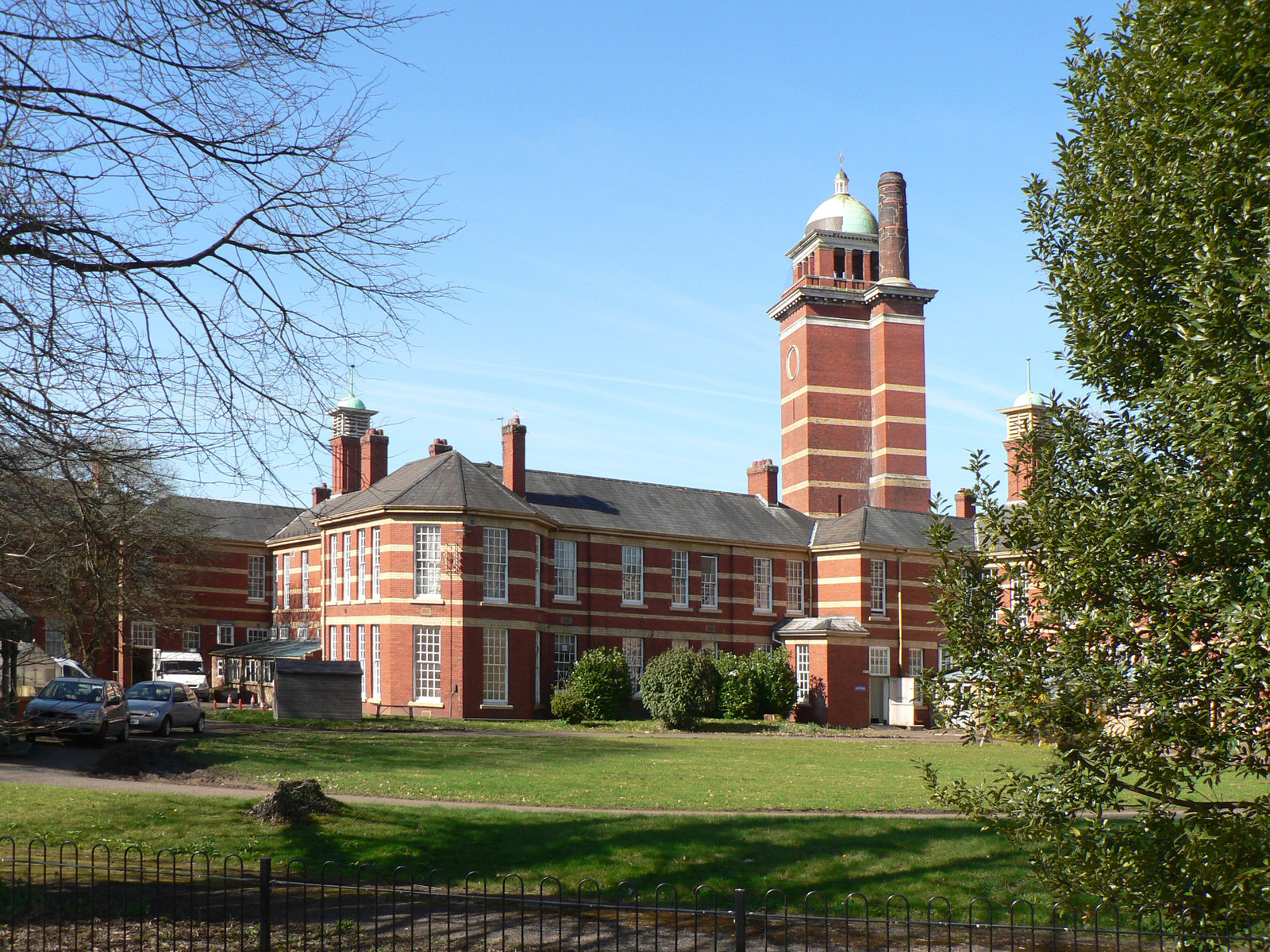
Whitchurch Hospital, with a 150 feet (46 m) water tower built over a power house

Costing £350,000 and ten years to build, the Cardiff City Asylum opened on 15 April 1908. The main hospital building covered 5 acres (2.0 ha), designed to accommodate 750 patients across ten wards, five each for men and women. Like many Victorian institutes, it was designed as a self-contained institute, with its own 150 feet (46 m) water tower atop a power house containing two Belliss and Morcom steam-engine powered electric generator sets, which were removed from standby in the mid-1980s. The site also contained a farm, which provided both food supplies and therapeutic work for patients.

The first medical superintendent was Edwin Goodall, whose then advanced approaches and therapies resulted in the hospital acquiring a reputation at the forefront of mental health care. Patients were also encouraged to take work and supervised tours outside the institute. The first matron was Florence Emily Raynes (1880–1940).

During the First World War, the facility was taken over by the military and became the Welsh Metropolitan War Hospital between 1915 and 1920.^{:56} Lieutenant Colonel Goodall was the Commanding Officer. H.Winnett Orr an American orthopaedic surgeon documented the services and his training at Cardiff in 1917 before serving in France. Dr Goodall was awarded a CBE in 1919 for the hospital's work with wounded and shell-shocked troops.^{:87} In 1918, Matron Raynes was awarded the Royal Red Cross Medal, 1st class for her service in the Queen Alexandra's Imperial Military Nursing Service, receiving the medal from the King at Buckingham Palace.

In the inter-war years, Cardiff City Mental Hospital was an early adopter of occupational therapy, a new treatment and profession founded by the American Occupational Therapy Association in 1917. Sister Patricia Sunderland, a registered mental nurse was appointed as the first occupational therapist in 1930. Sunderland's description of a hospital wide occupational therapy service at Cardiff City Mental Hospital was published in the Nursing Times in 1932. This was the first report of occupational therapy in Wales and the first publication by an Irish occupational therapist.

During the Second World War, part of the hospital was turned over to the military, becoming the largest emergency service hospital in South Wales, treating British, American and German personnel. There were 200 beds retained for civilian use, which enabled early treatment of post traumatic stress disorder of military patients.

On 5 July 1948, the hospital was taken over by the Ministry of Health when the National Health Service was founded. It was managed by the Whitchurch and Ely Hospital Management Committee, which also managed Ely Hospital, another large psychiatric hospital in Cardiff.

After the introduction of Care in the Community in the early 1980s the hospital went into a period of decline and the number of resident patients reduced.

The hospital was filmed in 2007 for the Torchwood episode From Out of the Rain, first broadcast on 12 March 2008.

In November 2010 the Cardiff and Vale University Health Board decided it was preferable to centralise all adult mental health care services at Llandough. The hospital closed in April 2016.
