= H. Winnett Orr =

American orthopedic surgeon

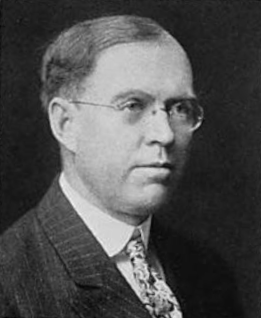
- Born: Hiram Winnett Orr; March 17, 1877; West Newton, Pennsylvania, US
- Died: October 11, 1956 (aged 79); Rochester, Minnesota, US
- Burial place: Arlington National Cemetery
- Education: University of Nebraska; University of Michigan Medical School
- Occupation: Orthopedic surgeon
- Spouse: Grace D. Orr

Hiram Winnett Orr (March 17, 1877 – October 11, 1956) was an American orthopedic surgeon who was born in Pennsylvania and was raised and lived the rest of his life in Nebraska. More than any other person, Orr was responsible for the invention of an effective method of using plaster casts and surgery to achieve a reduction in infection rates during treatment of open fractures and compound fractures before the widespread adoption of antibiotics.

== Biography ==
Hiram Winnett Orr was born in West Newton, Pennsylvania, on March 17, 1877, and grew up in Nebraska. After attending the University of Nebraska from 1892 to 1895, he was accepted to the University of Michigan Medical School during his junior year. He received his M.D. from Michigan in 1899, and returned to Nebraska to set up practice in Lincoln. In 1911, Orr became the superintendent of the Nebraska Orthopaedic Hospital.

=== Fracture care ===
When the United States entered World War I, Orr became a Major in the Medical Reserve Corps of the Allied Expeditionary Force. Before going to France, Orr worked alongside Dr. Alexis Carrel at the Welsh Metropolitan War Hospital at Cardiff in Wales. Carrel had pioneered the treatment of wounds with the expectation that infection was inevitable without proper care, and had helped create an antiseptic called the Carrel-Dakin solution.

While in France, Orr took the Carrel treatment further by cleaning wounds, packing them with petroleum soaked gauze (to prevent sticking), and then setting the fracture and immobilizing it with plaster-soaked bandages that would harden quickly. The results were visible within as little as three weeks, with no infection present after the primary cast was removed. Dr. Orr was credited by the British Medical Research Council as being one of three American physicians to pioneer the technique.

In 1921, Major Orr produced An Orthopedic Surgeon's Story of the Great War, an account detailing the preparation for, and providing Orthopaedic Services (including Nursing and Reconstruction Aides) to circa 16,000-18,000 men between July 1918 and March 1919 at Savenay Hospital Center, American Base Hospital No.8 in France.

=== Return to Nebraska ===
After leaving active service he returned to Nebraska. He helped organize and was commander of the 110th Medical Regiment of the Nebraska National Guard from June 23, 1922, to May 11, 1925. He later became chief surgeon at the Orthopedics Hospital, as well as of Bryan Memorial Hospital and Lincoln General Hospital. He was associated in private practice with Dr. Fritz Teal. Dr. Orr was a member of the Lancaster County Medical Association, the Nebraska Medical Association and the American Medical Association. He was for several years editor of the Journal of Orthopedic Surgery, and was a prolific writer and speaker, campaigning for his pioneering advances in treatment and for orthopedic surgery. Hiram Winnett Orr died in Rochester, Minnesota, on October 11, 1956, and was buried at Arlington National Cemetery.

== Legacy ==
Although casts are now taken for granted, the proper healing of a broken bone could take weeks, or even months, prior to the 20th century. A severe break could lead to an infection which prolonged the healing process in the best of circumstances, and a bedridden patient encountered collateral problems. If a fracture healed improperly, the results were crippling. The loss of a limb, or even death, was a possible outcome for a broken bone prior to the invention of the modern cast. Brilliant in its application, yet ingeniously simple, the cast method required little expense (bandages, plaster and water), minimal time for the physician, and provided a faster and more effective cure for broken bones. By the time of Orr's death, the cast had become such a routine part of childhood that a broken leg meant that one's friends would "autograph" the dried plaster while the patient endured a relatively minor inconvenience.

== Bibliography ==
- Anne of Brittany, Lincoln: North & Co. (1944)
- with Dr. Arthur Steindler, On the Contributions of Hugh Owen Thomas of Liverpool, Sir Robert Jones of Liverpool and London, and Dr. John Ridlon of New York City and Chicago to Modern Orthopedic Surgery, Springfield, Ill.: Chas. C Thomas (1950)
