= Azerbaijani National Guard =

Paramilitary security agency of Azerbaijan's military

Azerbaijani National Guard Azərbaycan Milli Qvardiyası
- Flag of National Guard

Agency overview
- Formed: 25 December 1991; 34 years ago
- Employees: 2,500

Jurisdictional structure
- Operations jurisdiction: Azerbaijan
- Specialist jurisdiction: Protection of international or domestic VIPs, protection of significant state assets

Operational structure
- Headquarters: Mammad Amin Rasulzadeh Street, Binəqədi raion, Baku
- Agency executives: Colonel-General Vagif Akhundov, Chief of SSPS; Colonel Ramin Babayev, Commander of the National Guard
- Parent agency: Special State Protection Service of Azerbaijan
- Azadlıq Marşı (Freedom's March)

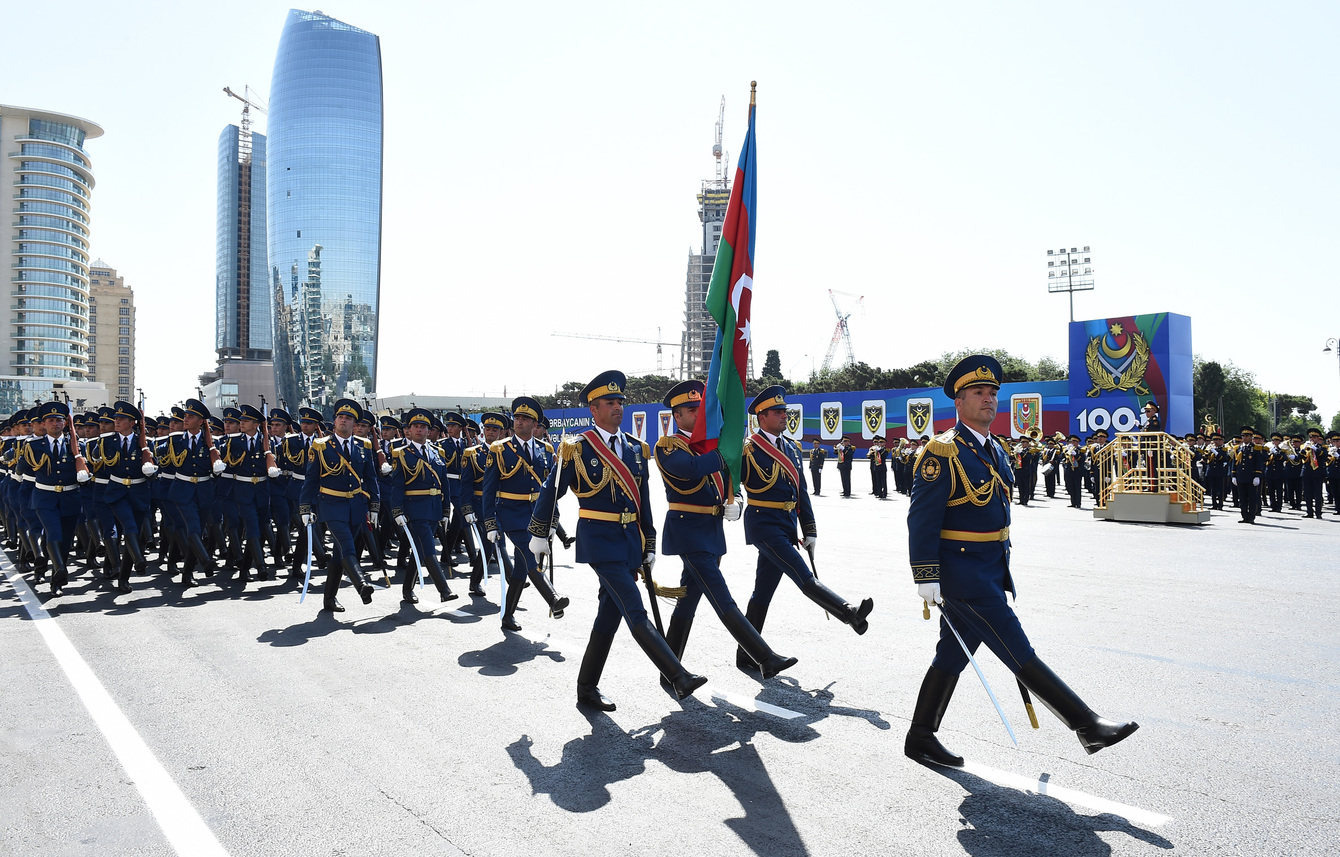
National Guard troops in the Day of the Armed Forces parade in 2018

The Azerbaijani National Guard (Azerbaijani: Azərbaycan Milli Qvardiyası) is an armed force of the Government of Azerbaijan, and operates as a semi-independent entity as well as the a reserve component of the Azerbaijan Army. The Special State Protection Service (SSPS) of Azerbaijan is a military unit subordinate to the President of Azerbaijan. The missions of the Azerbaijani National Guard are to protect government facilities such as the National Parliament, and the Presidential Administration of Azerbaijan as well as foreign heads of state and government in Azerbaijan.

== History ==
The National Guard was established on 25 December 1991. Initially, military service in National Guard was based on a voluntarily two-year contract. According to the presidential decree of 31 July 1992, the National Guard was expanded into the armed forces. Initially, military service in the National Guard was based on a two-year contract on a voluntary basis. The selection of personnel was carried out with the assistance of the personnel bodies of the Ministry of National Security and the Ministry of Interior. In 1993, Main Security Department of the Supreme State Authorities and Administration was established on the basis of the National Guard. The guard was definitely active in December 1996 but now appears to have been incorporated into the Special State Protection Service. The battle banner of National Guard was approved on 4 October 2005.

== Commanders ==
- Major General Akif Yusifov (2013 - 6 January 2026)
- Colonel Ramin Babayev (since 6 January 2026)

== Duties ==
Its responsibilities include organization of the President of Azerbaijan, the protection of the National Parliament, Presidential Administration of Azerbaijan, the Cabinet of Ministers, Ministry of Foreign Affairs of Azerbaijan, the Constitutional Court, the Central Election Commission and other public facilities as well as the protection of foreign heads of state on the territory of Azerbaijan. The National Guard has a wartime role as part of Azerbaijan's Land Forces. One of the most important tasks of the SSPS is the safety of the Baku-Tbilisi-Ceyhan pipeline and the South Caucasus Pipeline. NATO provides the service with several helicopters and vehicles in order to safeguard the pipeline. The Heydar Aliyev Memorial Museum and Honor is locoated on the territory of the National Guard.

=== Ceremonial activities ===
The National Guard provides a guard of honour battalion (Azerbaijani: Fəxri Qarovul taboru) for ceremonial activities in the national capital. The guard of honor consists of one chief, three flag bearers, three groups of 20 people each and the chief of those three groups. The guard of honor consists of a total of 66 people and the chief of the guard of honor.

In September 2011, the honour guard battalion received new distinct uniforms for their duties, replacing their black beret and jacket with a white coat and cap. it takes part in the program of foreign leader's state visits including wreath-laying ceremonies in front of the Tomb of the Heydar Aliyev in the Alley of Honor and in front of the Eternal Flame at Martyrs' Lane. The members of the National Guard had the honor of carrying the Flag of Azerbaijan and the Olympic flag during the Opening Ceremony of the 2015 European Games. It provided all ceremonial guards during the state funeral of Heydar Aliyev in December 2003.

== Gallery ==
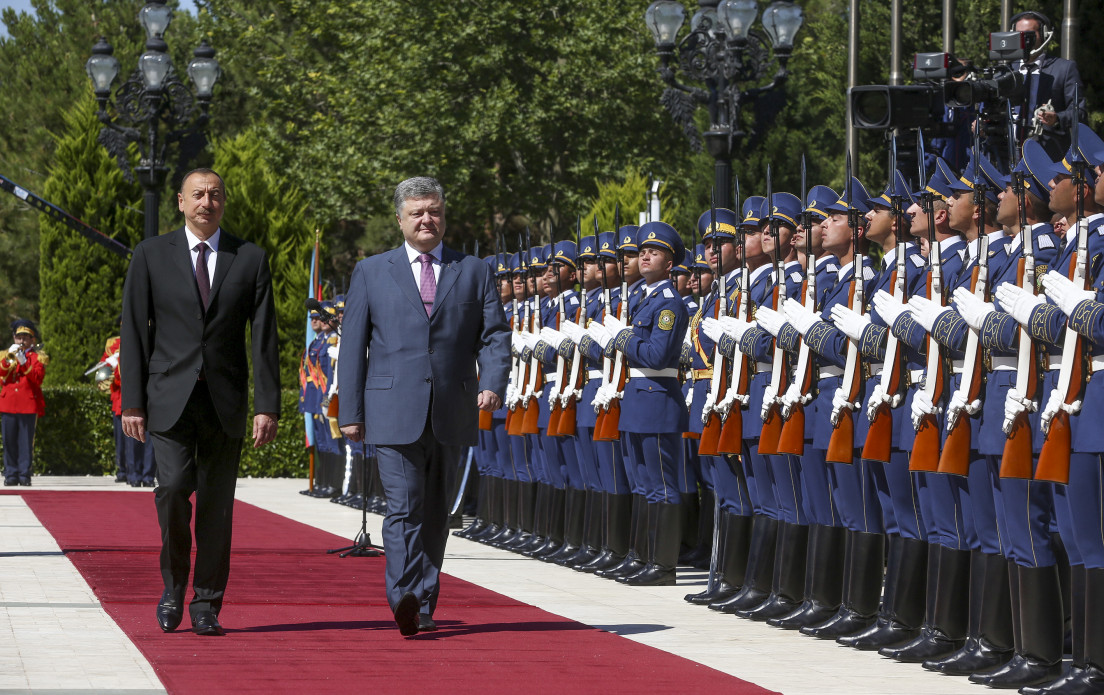

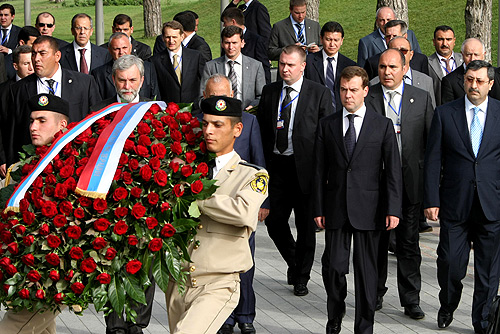

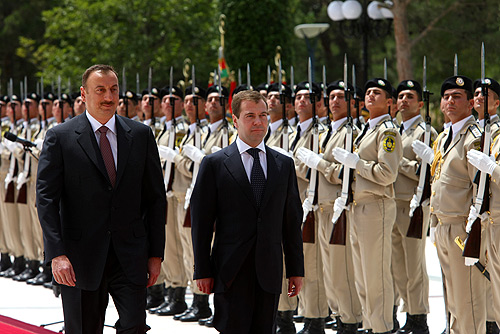
Dmitry Medvedev and Ilham Aliyev inspecting the National Guard during Medvedev's visit to Baku in 2008.

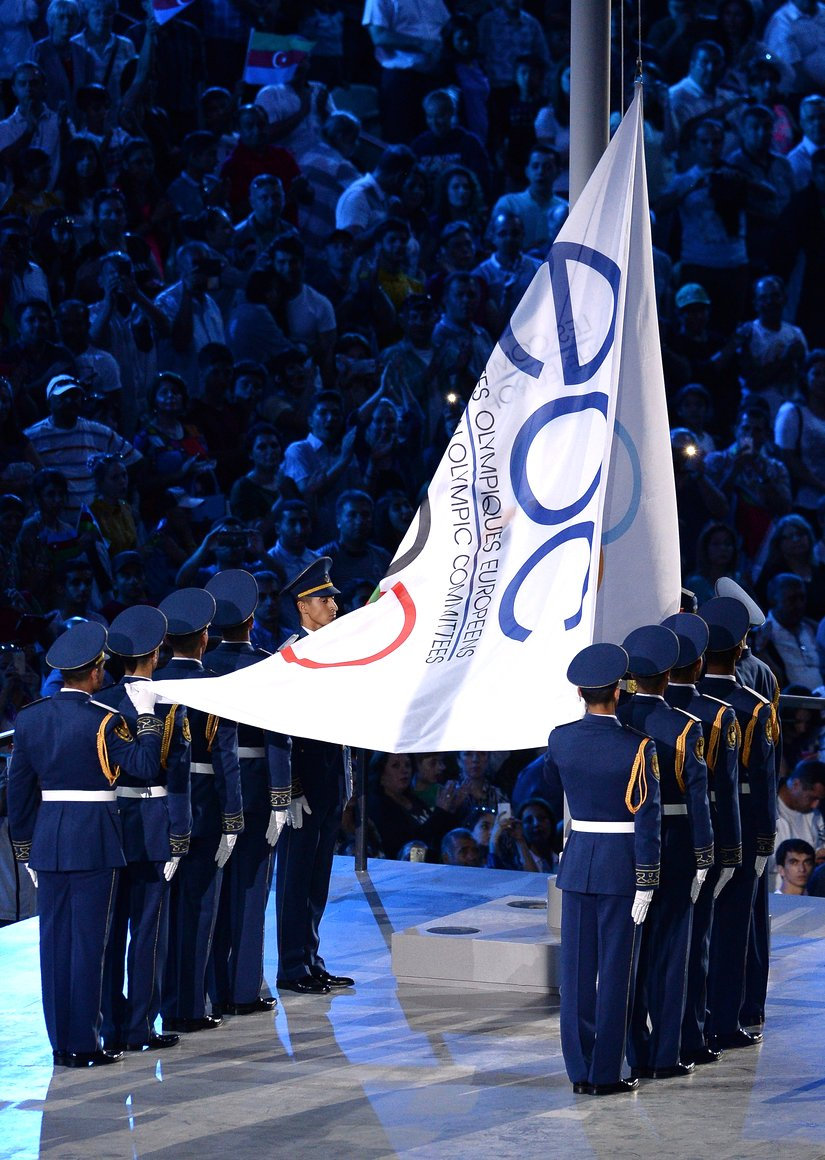
Members of the Azerbaijani National Guard raising the Olympic Flag.

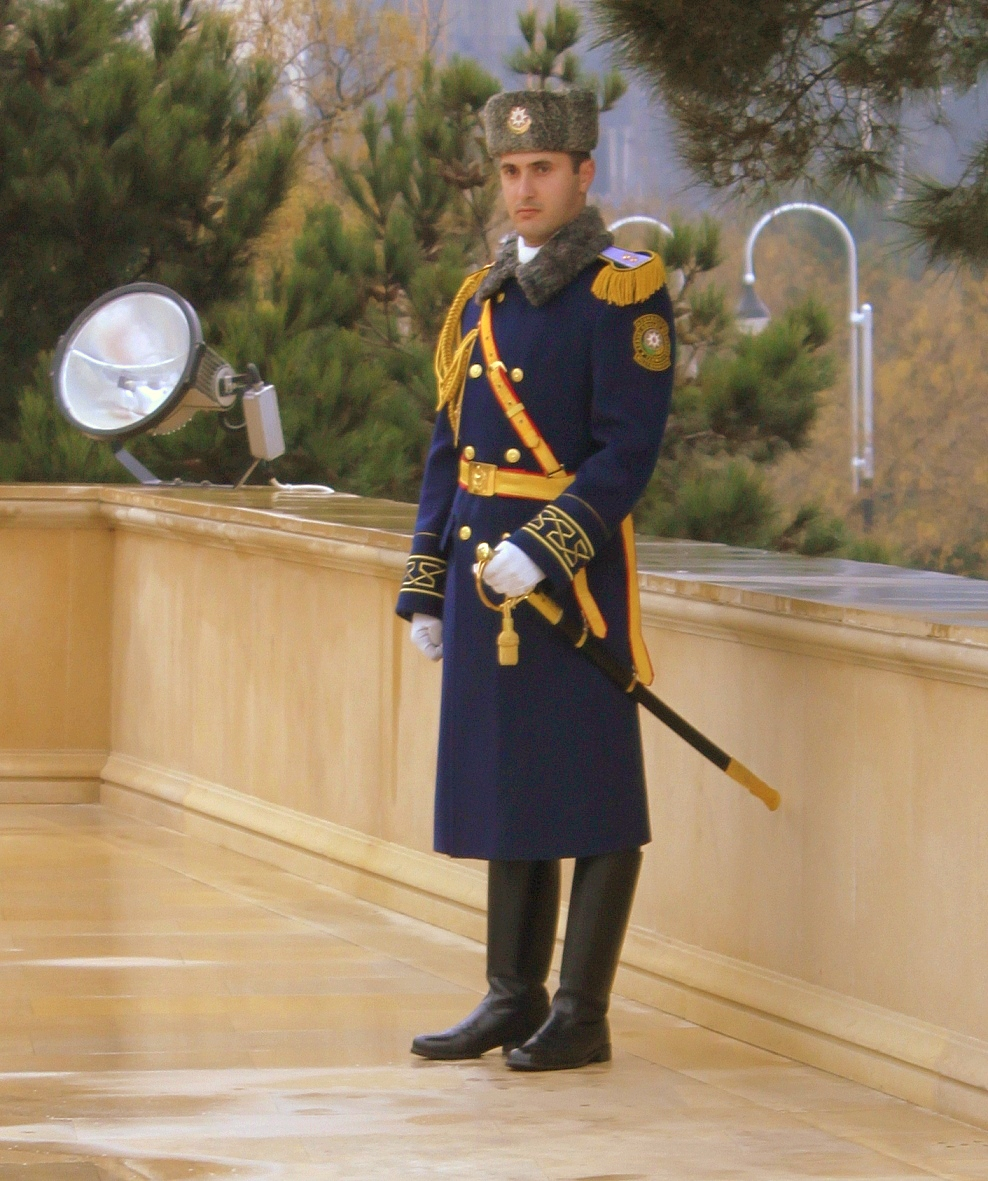

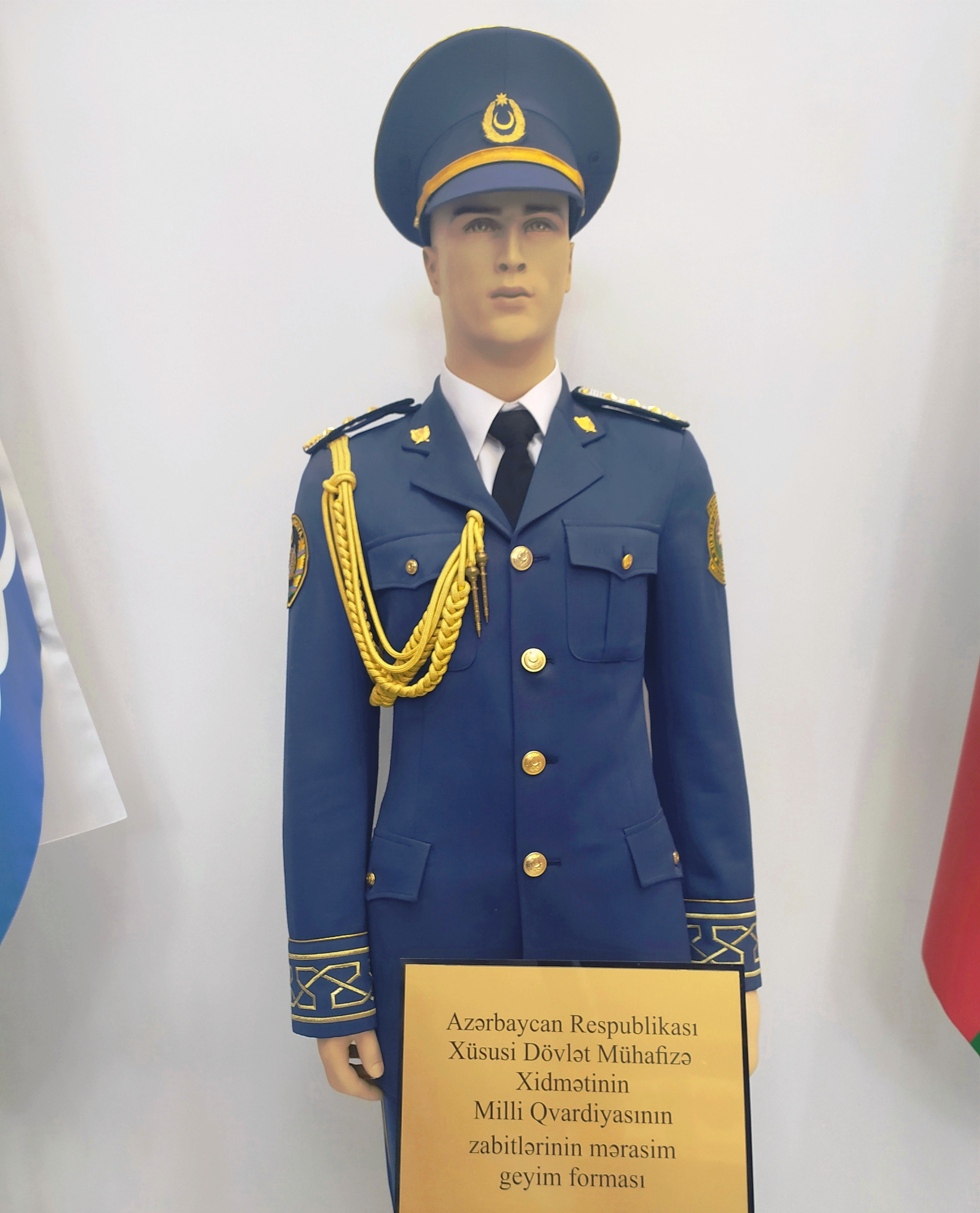

== See also ==
- Azerbaijani Armed Forces
- General Staff of Azerbaijani Armed Forces
- National Guard
- Internal Troops of Azerbaijan
- State Border Service (Azerbaijan)
- Azerbaijan Coast Guard
