= Mahmud Karimov =

Soviet physicist (1948–2013)

Mahmud Karim oglu Karimov
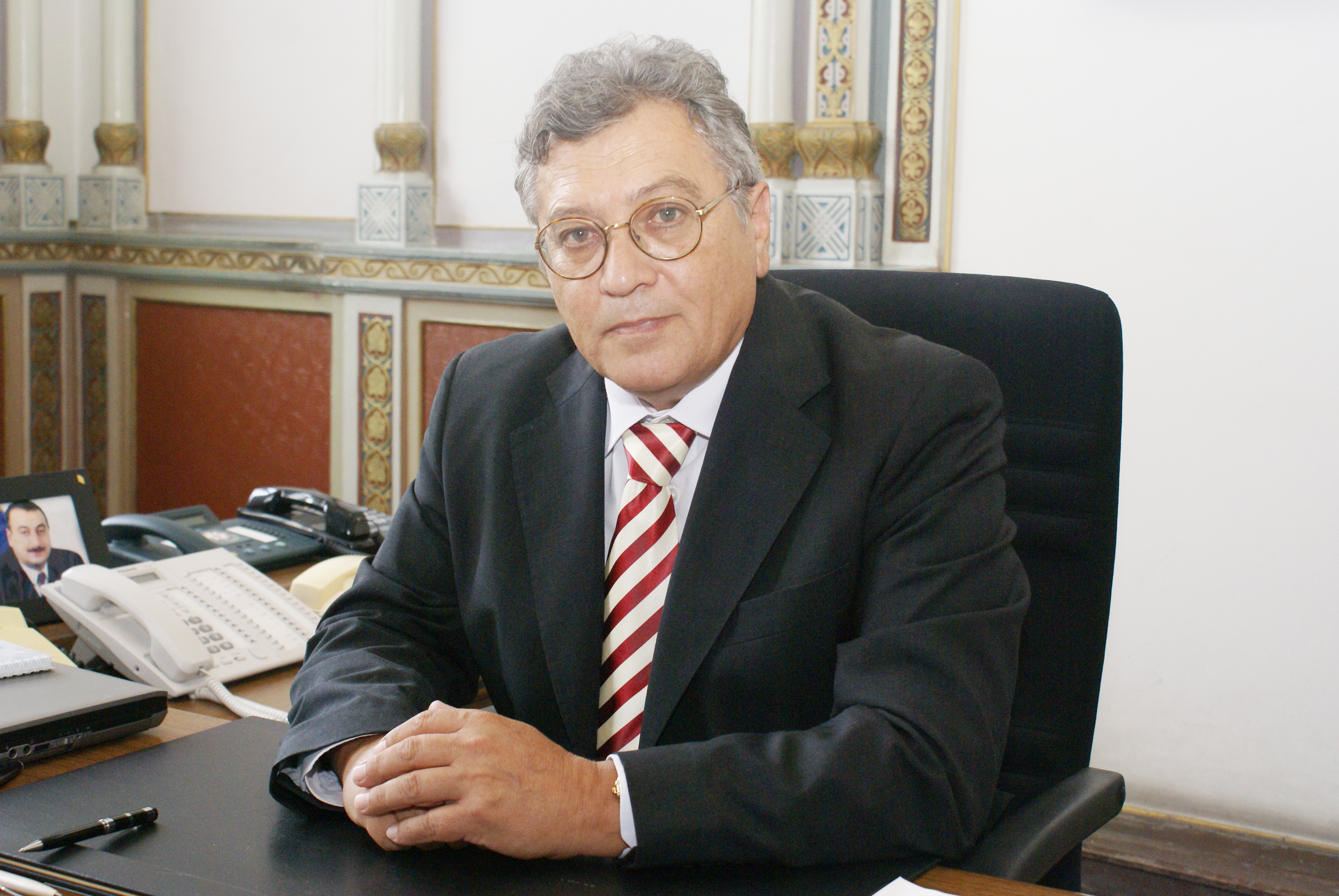
- Born: 18 October 1948; Yerevan, Armenian SSR
- Died: 13 February 2013 (aged 64); Istanbul
- Scientific career
- Fields: Physics
- Institutions: ANAS

Mahmud Karimov (18 October 1948; Yerevan, Armenian SSR - 10 February 2013; Istanbul, Turkey) was an Azerbaijani physicist, Doctor of Physical and Mathematical Sciences, Professor, President of the National Academy of Sciences of Azerbaijan.

== Life ==
Mahmud Karimov was born in Yerevan and graduated from the physics faculty of Azerbaijan State University.

Karimov's main research was related to radiation physics, informatics and physics of dielectrics. He also conducted scientific research in the fields of radioecology and radiation materials science. He headed the Radiation Research Sector for a long time and, in 2001, was elected a full member of the Azerbaijan National Academy of Sciences. Karimov collaborated with the International Atomic Energy Agency and worked on several projects related to radiation research. He was also a member of the commissions of CIS countries and Turkic countries on peaceful use of atomic energy. He was the president of ANAS from 2001 to 2013.

Karimov was the author of more than 200 articles and the owner of numerous patents. He worked as the president of the National Academy of Sciences, the chairman of the Republican Council for the Organization and Coordination of Scientific Research.

Mahmud Kerimov had two children named Sabina and Farid. He died on February 10, 2013, from a heart failure attack in one of the clinics in Istanbul, where he was urgently delivered by a special flight from Baku for emergency medical care. He was buried in the First Alley of Honor.
