= Mahmut Şenol =

Turkish-Canadian author and journalist

Mahmut Şenol (born November 23, 1958) is a contemporary Turkish and Canadian author and journalist. He has published 10 books as of April 2016. The author currently lives in Edmonton, Canada.

- Phaselis Adağı (2004) - novel/historical fiction
- Bay Konsolos (2005) - novel/fiction
- Çerkes Adil Paşa'nın Tahsildarlık Günleri (2007) - novel/fiction
- Keşfini Bekleyen Insan (2010) - non-fiction
- Kayısı Topuklu Kadınlar (2011) - essays and daily articles
- Akhisar Düşerken (2011) - novel/fiction
- Capon Çayevi (2012) - novel/fiction -
- Altıncı Hasta (2013) - theatre/play [ 6. Hasta ], this book is available as e-Pub, onto internet
- Geçiyordum, Uğradım (2015) - Short Stories.
- Dalkavuk Hanım (2016) - novel
- Bizim Unuttuğumuz Şey - (2017), Short Stories.
- Bir Roman Yazılıyor~Nicky'yi Öldürmek - (2020 )Fiction
